= Elizabeth O'Keeffe =

Australian public servant

Elizabeth O’Keeffe is a former senior public servant in the State Government of Victoria. She was executive director of Land Victoria from 1996 until 2002 and then the chief operating officer of the National Gallery of Victoria until 2005. After leaving the public service she was a director of Transparency International Australia until 2013.

== Land Victoria ==
O'Keeffe was the executive director (i.e. Chief Executive Officer) of Land Victoria, under the Department of National Resources and Environment (DNRE) from 1996 to 2002. O'Keeffe reported to the then Secretary of DNRE Chloe Munro from 1999 to 2002. Prior to 1999, O'Keeffe reported to then Secretary Michael Taylor (Mike Taylor (public servant)). Land Victoria (now called Land Use Victoria) is the land authority for the State Government of Victoria in Australia. Sherryl Garbutt was the responsible Minister.

O’Keeffe presented to an international conference in May 2001 on the establishment of Land Victoria in 1996. She described Land Victoria, as the agency within the state of Victoria with primary responsibility for land administration matters, and how it was intended to bring many of the State's core land administration functions into a single agency, specifically the functions of mapping, survey, valuation, Crown (or unalienated) land management and freehold title creation and registration. However, O’Keeffe's presented paper did not provided any background to the relevant laws. Indeed, the ignoring of the relevant laws and the assignment of responsibilities to other units within Land Victoria, without authority of even an approved service level agreement saw significant impacts on the statutory responsibilities of both the Surveyor-General and the Valuer-General. The O’Keeffe approach draws heavily upon the advice of Steven Jacoby, then Director of the Land Information Group, a unit within Land Victoria. Jacoby's responsibilities were largely transfers of responsibility from then Surveyor-General John Richard Parker, who stepped down in 1997. As was later to be reported by the acting Surveyors-General during the period 1997-99 and in the reports by Surveyor-General Keith Bell from 1999 to 2003, there was no authority. Further, the Victorian Government Solicitor, Auditor-General and Ombudsman delivered several findings which confirmed there was no authorization. Significantly, under Land Victoria, a contract was established with the joint venture between the firms Data Flow and Logica to develop the Victorian property mapping database, Vicmap property. The problems with this work, including lack of completeness and poor spatial accuracy were reported by both the Valuer-General and Surveyor-General, but were not rectified by O'Keeffe and Jacoby.

O’Keeffe's tenure as executive director of Land Victoria was one of controversy, disagreements and scandals, including: 1. Estate Agency Guarantee Fund scandal; 2. Threats and intimidation the Surveyor-General; 3. Reassign statutory responsibilities of Surveyor-General to other units of Land Victoria, breaching legislation - including the contracting for Vicmap property database, Measurement Calibration, Survey Control Network, GPS Base Station network (CORS); 4. Weakening the Office of the Valuer-General and downgrading the statutory position; 5. Blocking independent expert investigations concerning the Lindsay Fox Portsea land-grabbing complaints; 6. Interference with the Victorian electoral boundary re-distribution process; 7. Threats of legal action to intimidate staff of Land Victoria.

Significantly, there were recurrent disagreements with key senior and statutory officers including Land Registrar and other senior Land Registry officials, Surveyor-General and Valuer-General and serious governance issues were raised repeatedly. Throughout these, O'Keeffe seemed to have enjoyed the strong support of Minister Garbutt and Secretary Munro, despite the frequent concerns raised by the State opposition and the media.

== Estate Agents Guarantee Fund scandal ==
O’Keeffe's leadership of Land Victoria was raised in the Victorian Parliament by Opposition environment spokesman Victor Perton on 17 April 2002 for her leading role in the Estate Agents Guarantee Fund (EAGF) scandal. Specifically, Perton reported that Land Victoria and the Department of Justice (DoJ) had "conspired to invent a 'survey reform' project to extract $7.5 million from the fund". Land Victoria, a division of DNRE, under direction of O’Keeffe, and in collaboration with DoJ, was reported to have attempted to create “the survey project” to obtain extra government funding through EAGF, despite already having been funded. The administration of EAGF was under DoJ.

O’Keeffe's role in the EAGF scandal was reported to have also involved obtaining high level political approval for wrongful access to EAGF funds between October and December 2000. This included “invention” of a $1.5 million “fraudulent survey project” as well as “other funds hidden away in smaller applications” totalling $7.5 million. It was also reported that the survey project proposal was not revealed by O’Keeffe to the Surveyor-General of Victoria. Perton reported that efforts by the then Surveyor-General to raise his concerns about the attempts to obtain funds inappropriately from EAGF through his office resulted in the Surveyor-General being threatened and intimidated by O'Keeffe. It was later reported that the Surveyor-General had earlier reported his concerns to the Auditor-General who stepped in to prevent it from proceeding. The Surveyor-General also reported his concerns to the Ombudsman. Perton, in April 2002 in Parliament and earlier in the media, quoted "from documents from 2001 in which the assistant director of land records and information services, Ivan Powell, talks of having 'invented some benefits' in regards to the project and of a request to 'invent another layer of detail'. Powell was a senior Land Registry official (under Land Victoria). Perton reported to the Parliament that O’Keeffe was acting with the full support of the responsible Minister, Sherryl Garbutt. Garbutt, the Minister for Conservation and Environment, to which Land Victoria was accountable.

Further, Perton reported that investigations by the Auditor-General and by Deloitte Touche Tohmatsu (Deloitte) were not willingly assisted by O’Keeffe and Land Victoria. Requests for information and assistance by Deloitte's were blocked by Land Victoria. Perton reported that on 31 May 2001, Deloitte requested information from Land Victoria. In response, O’Keeffe's subordinate, John Hartigan, Director of the Land Registry (under Land Victoria) directed all staff to not comply with any request for information from Deloitte. Perton also reported that the Surveyor-General initially raised his concerns of the proposal to obtain funds from EAGF on 7 March 2001. His concerns were dismissed by O’Keeffe who “responded in threatening terms” that he was accountable to Garbutt and the Secretary (Munro) through O’Keeffe and Hartigan.

Specifically regarding the hiring of a legal firm and private investigators to investigate the Surveyor-General and his office, Garbutt advised that DENR under Munro had ordered an investigation but could find no evidence. In fact, efforts by DENR to blame the Surveyor-General for leaks were misplaced as Bell was a protected whistleblower, having gone through the appropriate channel to raise concerns with the Ombudsman. Thus, this was further evidence of malfeasance, including efforts to intimidate and harass the Surveyor-General, by O'Keeffe supported by Secretary Munro and endorsed by Minister Garbutt.

A subsequent investigation by the State Ombudsman, “A conspiracy between members of the Department of Natural Resources and Environment and of the Department of Justice to defraud the Estate Agents Guarantee Fund” found the attempt represented a conflict of interest and was not ethical. The Ombudsman advised two whistle-blowers had come forward to his office which led to his investigation in accordance with ‘public interest disclosures’ under section 50 the Whistle-blowers Protection Act 2001 and launched on 19 June 2002. The Ombudsman found that the "projectising" of the survey function was little more than a scheme to obtain additional funding, despite already being appropriated. The Ombudsman concluded: “Finally, the allegations that arose when this matter was placed under scrutiny ought to stand as a warning to those entrusted with determining the eligibility of applicants and/or programmes for funding from the various Statutory Trust Funds.”

Perton also reported to the Parliament that this was not the first attempt by Land Victoria to illegally obtain funds from the EAGF. The Auditor-General had prevented an earlier attempt by O’Keeffe-led Land Victoria and the Department of Justice to “raid the EAGF of $45 million".

== Surveyor-General of Victoria ==
The Opposition frequently raised its concerns regarding O’Keeffe's performance as the executive director of Land Victoria especially on matters of governance and accountability during the period 2001–02. O'Keeffe was especially cited for her interference with, including threats and intimidation of, the Surveyor-General, in the performance of his responsibilities. Such interference included: attempts to block or alter annual Surveyor-General reports; hiring of legal firm and private investigators to investigate the Surveyor-General and his office; and efforts to interfere with the Surveyor-General's review of State electoral boundaries in his capacity as an Electoral Boundaries Commissioner. Over the period 2001–04, The Age, Herald Sun and ABC carried numerous reports of such interference and it was frequently raised by the Opposition in both Houses of the Parliament of Victoria reported in Hansard. Such public reporting continued well after O’Keeffe departed Land Victoria in August 2002.

The Surveyor-General, through his annual reports required under the Survey Coordination Act (1958) reiterated concerns that while important responsibilities had been removed from him, he retained statutory accountability for them. In late 2001 the Auditor-General of Victoria undertook a performance audit of the survey information managed by Land Victoria. This review was tabled in Parliament in June 2002. The Auditor General confirmed concerns raised by Bell that key responsibilities assigned to the Surveyor-General under the Survey Co-ordination Act 1958 had been transferred to other units within Land Victoria, mainly the Land Information Group under its director, Steven Jacoby. Significantly, arising from the Auditor-General's review, as well as a further review by RMIT University and a further DNRE consultant's review “on a mutually agreed basis with the department” was the changed reporting of the Surveyor-General to the DNRE Deputy Secretary – Services, then Dale Seymour.

It was also reported that O’Keeffe had approved an illegal $100,000 contract for a consultant to “lobby her own Minister”, Garbutt, to discredit the Surveyor-General as well as the professional and industry bodies, the Institution of Surveyors Victoria and the Association of Consulting Surveyors Victoria, whilst also lobbying to promote the Spatial Information Industry Action Agenda. The contract was signed with the Australian Spatial Information Business Association (ASIBA), later known the Spatial Information Business Association (SIBA) and now the Geospatial Council of Australia (GCA). GCA also includes the Surveying and Spatial Sciences Institute (SSSI). The contract was agreed between O'Keeffe and ASIBA and reportedly signed with the concurrence of Garbutt and Munro. After adverse media and Opposition reporting, the contract was found to not be appropriate and was cancelled after the first tranche of $25,000 was paid to ASIBA.

Some five months after Bell had resigned as Surveyor-General in July 2003, the media reported on his experiences and the efforts to intimidate him and prevent his undertaking of his statutory roles. Especially noteworthy was that the surveying profession, the private sector and even the Premier, always retained the "utmost confidence" in Bell. The media reported its view that "Bell was targeted because he had internally raised concerns about the integrity of the proposed scheme to take funds from EAGF as well as his consistent candor in undertaking his responsibilities and reporting. Both the Auditor-General and the Ombudsman shared Bell's concerns.

The efforts of O'Keeffe, approved by Secretary Munro and Minister Garbutt, did not succeed and were decried through frequent reporting by the media and in the State Parliament by the Opposition. In fact, it is especially notable that Bell, was subsequently officially recognized for his professional service as both Surveyor-General and for his significant contributions to professions and good governance, through the conferring of several awards including a Doctorate of Applied Science Honoris Causa, RMIT University in 2003 and appointment as a Member of the Order of Australia in the 2022 Queen's Birthday Honours (Australia).

== Valuer-General of Victoria ==
The Office of the Valuer-General, placed under Land Victoria during O’Keeffe's tenure, suffered serious resourcing issues, including the statutory position also being downgraded and more broadly interference in the performance and delivery of statutory functions. Then Valuer-General, Jack Dunham, made statements on this subject to the media in mid-2002. His public comments drew the ire of O’Keeffe and Minister Garbutt. No action was taken by Secretary Munro. Dunham served as Valuer-General for the period 1995–2007.

The Valuer-General also reported concerns about the lack of reliability of Land Victoria's Vicmap property database in 2001. The Vicmap property database was under Jacoby, the director of the Land Information Group of Land Victoria. This was noted by the Surveyor-General who stated in his 2001-02 Annual Report: “The Valuer General has advised that during the year, in the undertaking of the Rural Assistance Program, which involved some 14 rural councils, approximately 20,000 land parcels were identified as missing or incorrectly described in the VicMap Property database. This highlights the lack of completeness of the VicMap Property database. The completeness of the VicMap Property database could be improved if the Valuer General’s work could be extended to cover all remaining rural councils.”

== Land Registry ==
Disagreement was found throughout Land Victoria, under O’Keeffe, including the Land Registry. One such disagreement was reported in the Western Australia media by former senior Land Registry officer, Mr. Grahame Searle, who commented that it caused his resignation in late 1997. Searle became the acting chief executive officer (CEO) of the Western Australia Department of Land Administration from January 1998 and subsequently the CEO of Landgate. The specific details of Searle's disagreement with O’Keeffe were not disclosed.

== Lindsay Fox Portsea Land Grabbing ==
In the 1990s, many complaints from the public were submitted to the Victorian government - to ministers and Land Victoria regarding Fox's construction of walls and breakwaters in the beach areas outside of his Portsea property on the Mornington Peninsula. These constructions enabled significant accretion of land to the beach changing the mean high water mark boundary. Normal accretion is required to be slow and imperceptible. The Fox constructions enabled rapid accretion. During 1997–99, acting Surveyors-General Barrie Bremner and Allan Fennell, undertook expert investigations and determined that the gains in land were neither slow nor imperceptible. As such, Fox could not claim ownership of the accreted lands. Bremner's and Fennell's investigations were stopped by O'Keeffe. In 1999–2000, then Surveyor-General Bell undertook expert investigations, which including reviewing the previous investigations by Bremner and Fennell. Bell's reporting to Minister Garbutt and Secretary Munro through O'Keeffe, was stopped by O'Keeffe. Public complaints have continued over the years.

== Spatial Information Industry Action Agenda and ANZLIC ==
O’Keeffe was a member of the national Spatial Information Industry Action Agenda Steering Group, representing the Australian New Zealand Land Information Council (ANZLIC) until her sudden departure from Land Victoria in July 2002. Her much reported departure from Land Victoria saw her replaced on ANZLIC and other national Spatial Information Industry Action Agenda roles. O’Keeffe was the Victorian state delegate to ANZLIC which was then chaired by Warwick Watkins from the late 1990s until 2011, when he was found guilty of corruption by the New South Wales Independent Commission Against Corruption (ICAC) and sacked from government. Consequently, Watkins was replaced as ANZLIC Chair and also other roles concerning the national Spatial Information Industry Action Agenda including the Australian Spatial Consortium and the Cooperative Research Centre-Spatial Information.

Warren Entsch, then Parliamentary Secretary to the Minister for Industry, Science and Resources, officially welcomed the establishment of a steering group to drive the Spatial Information Industry Action Agenda in November 2000. The Action Agenda was released in September 2001. Under the Spatial Information Industry Action Agenda, on 25 September 2001, then Minister for Industry, Science and Resources, Senator Nick Minchin announced a $2 million Grant to a consortium of private “spatial firms” to increase the effectiveness of spatial information. ASIBA was identified as the industry body to lead most of the responsibility under the action agenda. Minchin also identified the key intergovernmental roles of ANZLIC under the Action Agenda.

In late 2001, O’Keeffe approved a $100,000 contract for a consultant to “lobby her own Minister” Sherryl Garbutt to promote the Spatial Information Industry Action Agenda and discredit the Surveyor-General - a contract later to be determined as illegal and cancelled. This consultant was described by the Opposition in Parliament as the "illegal ASIBA consultant" - refer to discussion under Surveyor-General. The contract was signed around September 2001 with O'Keeffe when she met with then Chairman of ASIBA Tony Wheeler and then ASIBA CEO David Hocking. ASIBA was later renamed the Spatial Industries Business Association (SIBA) and ultimately amalgamated with the Surveying & Spatial Sciences Institute (SSSI) as the Geospatial Council of Australia (GCA). Wheeler who became the CEO of SSSI in 2020 and then GCA November 2022, was in the role when GCA went into liquidation in August 2025.

== Departure from Land Victoria ==
On 12 July 2002, the prominent Melbourne newspaper, The Age, reported that O’Keeffe had resigned and further reported that the Opposition claimed O’Keeffe had been sacked. Minister Garbutt denied that O'Keeffe had been sacked. The same day, O’Keeffe issued an internal memo, copied to all DNRE staff, dismissing the Opposition claims and advising she had instructed her lawyers to seek an unconditional retraction and apology from the Opposition and media. Also, she advised she would take legal action on any further claims. The media reporting of O'Keeffe's departure as a sacking continued, but there was no reported legal action taken by O'Keeffe. However, there were further departures from Land Victoria including Hartigan a few weeks prior to O'Keeffe in June 2002 and Jacoby at the end of 2002. It was reported that Hartigan was removed from Land Victoria and placed in another department, and Jacoby, whose three year contract was scheduled for renewal at end of 2002, would not be renewed.

== National Gallery of Victoria ==
She was subsequently the Chief Operating Officer of the National Gallery of Victoria (NGV) from August 2002 until September 2005. She also served as Secretary to the NGV Council of Trustees. The Age reported 7 January 2004 on a potential cover-up at the NGV when a glass panel in the roof shattered in late 2003 following the re-opening after almost 4 years of closure for renovations. "The gallery has been warned that more glass panels - a feature of the recently reopened gallery's $168 million redesign - could shatter.” O’Keeffe advised that a preliminary report had speculated that the breakage might have been caused by extreme heat combined with chemical reactions in the glass. O’Keeffe was interviewed on ABC Radio Melbourne, on 7 July 2004, to explain that there was no danger to the public. However, she was contradicted by members of the public raising their own experiences at the Gallery. O’Keeffe was described by ABC as having a “bad day” due to her lack of understanding of the issues and dangers. On 9 February 2004, it was the NGV's Director, rather than O’Keeffe, who announced NGV and Major Projects Victoria Department had ordered an engineering audit of the Gallery. Clearly, O'Keeffe's capacity and competency for her role at NGV were repeatedly brought under public scrutiny. The NGV, in its 2003-04 Annual Report acknowledged the adverse media attention that the glass shattering had attracted.

== Transparency International Australia ==
O’Keeffe subsequently worked as a strategic management consultant and also for Transparency International Australia (TIA) as a director from 7 August 2006 to 20 November 2014. O’Keeffe appeared as a witness on behalf of TIA, before the Victorian Parliament Law Reform Committee on 29 June 2009, regarding the Inquiry into review of the Members of Parliament (Register of Interests) Act. She spoke on the roles of Transparency International in reporting on corruption and presented her views. O’Keeffe, in her official capacity as a Director of TIA commented: “It would have been preferable for whistleblower complaints about MPs to go to an independent body.” In November 2012, O’Keeffe was especially critical of the Victorian State Government under then Premier Ted Baillieu regarding whistleblower complaints about politicians. Baillieu, as Shadow Planning Minister during O'Keeffe's period at Land Victoria, was highly critical of O'Keeffe's performance and serious governance issues including efforts to intimidate the Surveyor-General, especially attempted blocking of his statutory reporting and also performance as an electoral boundaries redistribution commissioner.

Notably, TIA claims it "holds the powerful and corrupt to account, by exposing the systems and networks that enable corruption". Further, TIA claims that it advocates for policies and to build coalitions "to change the status quo" and its "vision of a corruption-free world is not an end in itself. It is the fight for social and economic justice, human rights, peace and security". Thus, the engagement of O'Keeffe by TIA, given her much reported Land Victoria experiences and departure, would not seem to be consistent with the promoted values and vision of TIA. It is not known whether TIA was even aware of O'Keeffe's past experiences with Land Victoria.
