= Surveying in Oceania =

Surveying in Oceania may refer to:

- Surveying in Australia
- Surveying in New Zealand
