= ANZLIC =

- The Spatial Information Council
- Formation: 1986; 40 years ago
- Website: www.anzlic.gov.au
- Formerly called: Australian Land Information Council (ALIC); Australia and New Zealand Land Information Council (ANZLIC); Australia and New Zealand Spatial Information Council

ANZLIC, or The Spatial Information Council, is the peak intergovernmental organisation providing leadership in the collection, management and use of spatial information in Australia and New Zealand. It supports the establishment of a Spatial Data Infrastructure in the region and has published geospatial metadata standards. ANZLIC started in 1986 as the Australian Land Information Council (ALIC) and it became the Australia and New Zealand Land Information Council (ANZLIC) in 1991. ANZLIC, now refers to itself as the Spatial Information Council.

Warwick Watkins was the longest serving Chairman of ANZLIC, 2000–2011, until he was dismissed from the NSW Public Service. ANZLIC chair appointments are typically only for two years, but Watkins held the chair for more than eleven. Drew Clarke immediately replaced Watkins as Chair of ANZLIC and remained as Chair until mid 2015. Watkins was found guilty of corruption by the New South Wales Independent Commission Against Corruption (ICAC) and sacked from government.

ANZLIC, under Watkins, was the driver of the Spatial Information Industry Action Agenda. Elizabeth O'Keeffe, Victoria ANZLIC delegate (Land Victoria), represented ANZLIC on the Spatial Information Industry Action Agenda Steering Group. Warren Entsch, then Parliamentary Secretary to the Minister for Industry, Science and Resources, officially welcomed the establishment of a steering group to drive the Spatial Information Industry Action Agenda in November 2000. The Action Agenda was released in September 2001. O’Keeffe, herself, was reportedly removed from her Land Victoria role, and consequentially as Victorian representative to ANZLIC, arising from an investigation into attempt fraud of a government trust fund. On 12 July 2002, the prominent Melbourne newspaper, The Age, reported that O’Keeffe had resigned and further reported that the Opposition claimed O’Keeffe had been sacked. Her Minister, Sherryl Garbutt denied that O'Keeffe had been sacked. The same day, O’Keeffe issued an internal memo, copied to all DNRE staff, dismissing the Opposition claims and advising she had instructed her lawyers to seek an unconditional retraction and apology from the Opposition and media. Also, she advised she would take legal action on any further claims.

The Intergovernmental Committee on Surveying and Mapping (ICSM), became a standing committee of ANZLIC in 2002. ICSM was established by the Prime Minister, State Premiers, and the Chief Minister of the Northern Territory in 1988. Since that time the Australian Capital Territory and New Zealand have joined ICSM. The Australian Defence forces are also represented on ICSM. Members are senior representatives of surveying and mapping agencies. Prior to 1988 a similar body, the National Mapping Council (NMC), had coordinated cooperative Commonwealth, State and Northern Territory mapping programs since 1945. Although the NMC had been an effective forum, the changing operational environment of the late 1980s led to the cessation of the NMC and the formation of ICSM to cover both surveying and mapping issues, as they related to Government activities, to ensure continued cooperation in these activities on a national basis.

== See also ==
- Surveying in Australia
- Surveying and Spatial Sciences Institute
