= SSSI (disambiguation) =

SSSI can mean:

- Solid state storage initiative, a network promoting the use of solid state storage
- Site of Special Scientific Interest, a UK nature conservation designation
- Site of Special Scientific Interest (Hong Kong), a Hong Kong nature conservation designation
- Skin and skin structure infection, a bacterial infection of the skin
- Stainless Steel Studios, a video games company
- "Special Secret Song Inside", a track from the Red Hot Chili Peppers album The Uplift Mofo Party Plan
- Surveying and Spatial Sciences Institute
