= Electoral results for the district of Bundoora =

Victoria, Australia, district election results

This is a list of electoral results for the Electoral district of Bundoora in Victorian state elections.

== Members for Bundoora ==
Member	Party	Term
John Cain	Labor	1976–1992
Sherryl Garbutt	Labor	1992–2006
Colin Brooks	Labor	2006–present

== Election results ==
=== Elections in the 2020s ===
2022 Victorian state election: Bundoora
Party	Candidate	Votes	%	±%
Labor	Colin Brooks	19,288	47.8	−7.7
Liberal	Sahil Tomar	11,167	27.7	−1.8
Greens	Julie O'Brien	5,311	13.2	+5.1
Freedom	Andrew Lu	1,637	4.1	+4.1
Family First	Ethan Jones	1,294	3.2	+3.2
Animal Justice	Bella Holgate	1,231	3.0	+0.5
Independent	Eric Koelmeyer	408	1.0	+1.0
Total formal votes		40,336	94.8	+0.5
Informal votes		2,209	5.2	−0.5
Turnout		42,545	89.9	+0.7
Two-party-preferred result
Labor	Colin Brooks	25,364	62.7	−3.5
Liberal	Sahil Tomar	15,066	37.3	+3.5
Labor hold		Swing	−3.5	

=== Elections in the 2010s ===
2018 Victorian state election: Bundoora
Party	Candidate	Votes	%	±%
Labor	Colin Brooks	19,670	56.2	+3.5
Liberal	Jenny Mulholland	9,944	28.4	−5.0
Greens	Clement Stanyon	2,778	7.9	−2.3
Animal Justice	Rodney Whitfield	1,007	2.9	+2.9
Reason	Bryce Baker	817	2.3	+2.3
Victorian Socialists	Jacob Andrewartha	804	2.3	+2.3
Total formal votes		35,020	94.0	−1.5
Informal votes		2,218	6.0	+2.5
Turnout		37,238	91.1	−2.9
Two-party-preferred result
Labor	Colin Brooks	23,664	67.4	+5.2
Liberal	Jenny Mulholland	11,442	32.6	−5.2
Labor hold		Swing	+5.2	

2014 Victorian state election: Bundoora
Party	Candidate	Votes	%	±%
Labor	Colin Brooks	18,628	52.7	+2.6
Liberal	Amita Gill	11,822	33.4	−0.1
Greens	Clement Stanyon	3,592	10.2	+1.0
Family First	James Widdowson	1,338	3.8	+0.3
Total formal votes		35,380	95.5	+1.0
Informal votes		1,682	4.5	−1.0
Turnout		37,062	94.0	+1.3
Two-party-preferred result
Labor	Colin Brooks	22,035	62.2	+1.3
Liberal	Amita Gill	13,376	37.8	−1.3
Labor hold		Swing	+1.3	

2010 Victorian state election: Bundoora
Party	Candidate	Votes	%	±%
Labor	Colin Brooks	14,967	46.06	−6.99
Liberal	Goldy Brar	11,859	36.49	+6.47
Greens	Tim Roberts	3,285	10.11	−0.99
Family First	Luke Conlon	915	2.82	−2.06
Independent	Karen-Joy McColl	764	2.35	+2.35
Democratic Labor	Catherine O'Farrell	707	2.18	+2.18
Total formal votes		32,497	94.83	−0.58
Informal votes		1,770	5.17	+0.58
Turnout		34,267	93.51	−0.75
Two-party-preferred result
Labor	Colin Brooks	18,784	57.69	−7.43
Liberal	Goldy Brar	13,771	42.31	+7.43
Labor hold		Swing	−7.43	

=== Elections in the 2000s ===
2006 Victorian state election: Bundoora
Party	Candidate	Votes	%	±%
Labor	Colin Brooks	16,868	53.05	−6.46
Liberal	Kane Afford	9,544	30.02	+0.42
Greens	Sarah Jefford	3,529	11.10	+1.47
Family First	Dean Cronkwright	1,550	4.88	+4.88
Citizens Electoral Council	Rod McLennan	303	0.95	−0.31
Total formal votes		31,794	95.41	−0.83
Informal votes		1,531	4.59	+0.83
Turnout		33,325	94.26	+0.26
Two-party-preferred result
Labor	Colin Brooks	20,701	65.12	−2.45
Liberal	Kane Afford	11,086	34.88	+2.45
Labor hold		Swing	−2.45	

2002 Victorian state election: Bundoora
Party	Candidate	Votes	%	±%
Labor	Sherryl Garbutt	18,856	59.5	+3.9
Liberal	Melanie Randall	9,381	29.6	−12.4
Greens	Gayle McDonald	3,053	9.6	+9.6
Citizens Electoral Council	Walter Mellado	398	1.3	+1.3
Total formal votes		31,688	96.2	−0.8
Informal votes		1,239	3.8	+0.8
Turnout		32,927	94.0	
Two-party-preferred result
Labor	Sherryl Garbutt	21,411	67.6	+10.4
Liberal	Melanie Randall	10,277	32.4	−10.4
Labor hold		Swing	+10.4	

=== Elections in the 1990s ===
1999 Victorian state election: Bundoora
Party	Candidate	Votes	%	±%
Labor	Sherryl Garbutt	18,375	54.4	+3.9
Liberal	Carol McCabe	14,612	43.2	−3.3
Natural Law	Ngaire Mason	807	2.4	−0.6
Total formal votes		33,794	97.2	−0.8
Informal votes		973	2.8	+0.8
Turnout		34,767	94.6	
Two-party-preferred result
Labor	Sherryl Garbutt	18,942	56.1	+3.5
Liberal	Carol McCabe	14,852	43.9	−3.5
Labor hold		Swing	+3.5	

1996 Victorian state election: Bundoora
Party	Candidate	Votes	%	±%
Labor	Sherryl Garbutt	16,735	50.5	+3.0
Liberal	Mark Webster	15,447	46.6	+0.4
Natural Law	Robert Brown	978	2.9	−0.7
Total formal votes		33,160	98.0	+1.7
Informal votes		689	2.0	−1.7
Turnout		33,849	95.3	
Two-party-preferred result
Labor	Sherryl Garbutt	17,429	52.6	+1.5
Liberal	Mark Webster	15,718	47.4	−1.5
Labor hold		Swing	+1.5	

1992 Victorian state election: Bundoora
Party	Candidate	Votes	%	±%
Labor	Sherryl Garbutt	15,230	47.4	−11.3
Liberal	Olga Venables	14,832	46.2	+5.4
Natural Law	Santo Consolino	1,174	3.7	+3.7
Independent	Roman Klis	878	2.7	+2.7
Total formal votes		32,114	96.3	+0.1
Informal votes		1,245	3.7	−0.1
Turnout		33,359	96.2	
Two-party-preferred result
Labor	Sherryl Garbutt	16,390	51.1	−8.0
Liberal	Olga Venables	15,671	48.9	+8.0
Labor hold		Swing	−8.0	

=== Elections in the 1980s ===
1988 Victorian state election: Bundoora
Party	Candidate	Votes	%	±%
Labor	John Cain	16,255	60.21	−0.35
Liberal	John Goodfellow	10,741	39.79	+7.18
Total formal votes		26,996	96.08	−1.92
Informal votes		1,100	3.92	+1.92
Turnout		28,096	93.13	−1.35
Labor hold		Swing	−2.69	

1985 Victorian state election: Bundoora
Party	Candidate	Votes	%	±%
Labor	John Cain	16,184	60.6	−0.2
Liberal	Alistair Urquhart	8,713	32.6	−0.9
Weekend Trading	Frank Penhalluriack	1,826	6.8	+6.8
Total formal votes		26,723	98.0	
Informal votes		545	2.0	
Turnout		27,268	94.5	
Two-party-preferred result
Labor	John Cain	16,648	62.3	−2.0
Liberal	Alistair Urquhart	10,075	37.7	+2.0
Labor hold		Swing	−2.0	

1982 Victorian state election: Bundoora
Party	Candidate	Votes	%	±%
Labor	John Cain	19,894	64.2	+4.6
Liberal	Peter Clarke	9,789	31.6	−5.3
Democrats	Peter Shaw	1,297	4.2	+4.2
Total formal votes		30,980	97.5	+0.4
Informal votes		777	2.5	−0.4
Turnout		31,757	94.6	+0.2
Two-party-preferred result
Labor	John Cain	20,623	66.6	+6.0
Liberal	Peter Clarke	10,357	33.4	−6.0
Labor hold		Swing	+6.0	

=== Elections in the 1970s ===
1979 Victorian state election: Bundoora
Party	Candidate	Votes	%	±%
Labor	John Cain	16,957	59.6	+6.3
Liberal	Anthony Cree	10,509	36.9	−9.8
Independent	Jamie Bogle	1,005	3.5	+3.5
Total formal votes		28,471	97.1	−0.6
Informal votes		837	2.9	+0.6
Turnout		29,308	94.4	+0.5
Two-party-preferred result
Labor	John Cain	17,251	60.6	+7.3
Liberal	Anthony Cree	11,220	39.4	−7.3
Labor hold		Swing	+7.3	

1976 Victorian state election: Bundoora
Party	Candidate	Votes	%	±%
Labor	John Cain	14,030	53.3	+4.2
Liberal	Dorothy Baker	12,292	46.7	+8.9
Total formal votes		26,322	97.7	
Informal votes		625	2.3	
Turnout		26,947	93.9	
Labor hold		Swing	+0.6	
