= Land districts of New Zealand =

The land districts of New Zealand are the cadastral divisions of New Zealand, which are used on property titles. There are 12 districts, six in the North Island and six in the South Island. The land districts are distinct from the 16 local government regions. The current legislation for the land districts is the Land Transfer Act 1952.

== North Island districts ==
- North Auckland Land District – includes the Northland and Auckland regions
- South Auckland Land District – most of the Waikato region, and some of the Bay of Plenty region
- Gisborne Land District – similar area to the Gisborne Region
- Taranaki Land District – similar area to the Taranaki region
- Hawke's Bay Land District – similar area to the Hawke's Bay region
- Wellington Land District – includes the Wellington region and much of the Manawatū–Whanganui region, as well as the Chatham Islands

== South Island districts ==
- Nelson Land District – includes Nelson, Tasman and the northern part of the West Coast region
- Marlborough Land District – similar area to the Marlborough region
- Westland Land District – the south and central parts of the West Coast region
- Canterbury Land District – similar area to the Canterbury region
- Otago Land District – similar area to the Otago region
- Southland Land District – similar area to the Southland region

== See also ==
- Surveying in New Zealand
