= Journal of Spatial Science =

- Discipline: Earth and atmospheric sciences, Remote sensing
- Language: English

Publication details
- Former name(s): Cartography; Australian Surveyor; Geomatics Research Australasia; Australian Journal of Geodesy, Photogrammetry, and Surveying
- Publisher: Taylor & Francis

Standard abbreviations
- ISO 4: J. Spat. Sci.

Indexing
- ISSN: 1449-8596 (print); 1836-5655 (web)

The Journal of Spatial Science is an academic journal about spatial sciences published by Taylor & Francis on behalf of the Mapping Sciences Institute (Australia) and the Surveying and Spatial Sciences Institute. It covers cartography, geodesy, geographic information science, hydrography, digital image analysis and photogrammetry, remote sensing, surveying and related areas. Its editor-in-chief is Graeme Wright; its 2018 impact factor is 1.711.

It started in 2004 as a continuation of both Cartography (1954-2003) and Australian Surveyor (1928-2003). It also absorbed Geomatics Research Australasia (1995-2004), a continuation of the Australian Journal of Geodesy, Photogrammetry, and Surveying (1979-1994).
