= Surveying in Australia =

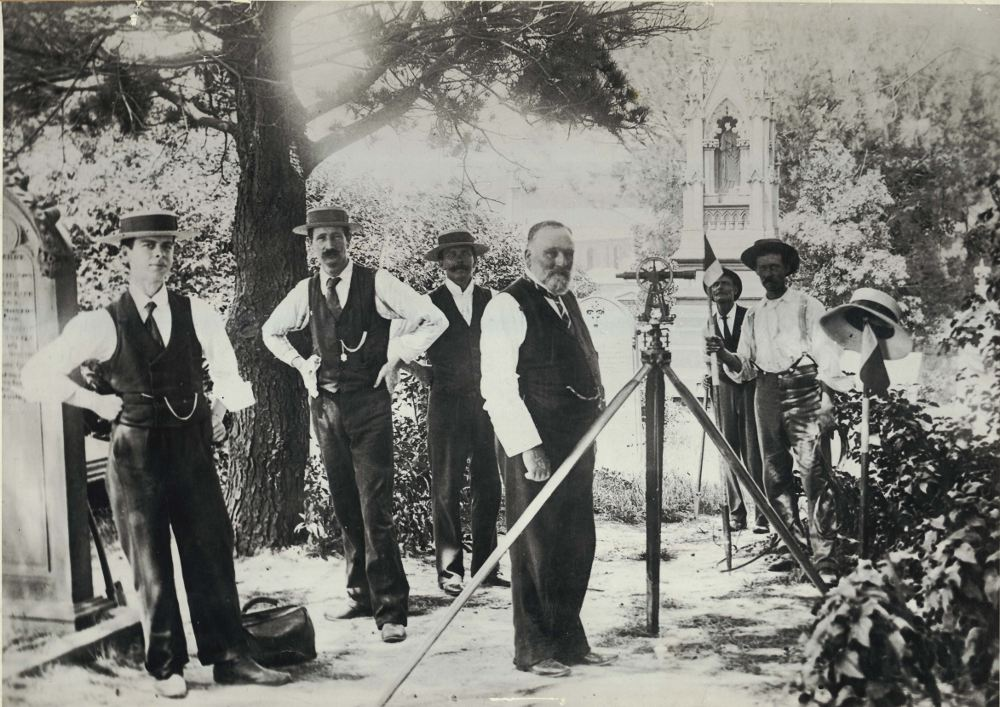
Surveying for Central Station, Sydney, 1900.

Surveying in Australia is triangulation-based and shares many similarities with the United Kingdom, including the title deed system. However, a distinctive feature of surveying in Australia is the Torrens System, where real estate records are held in a central deposit and guaranteed by the state.

== History ==
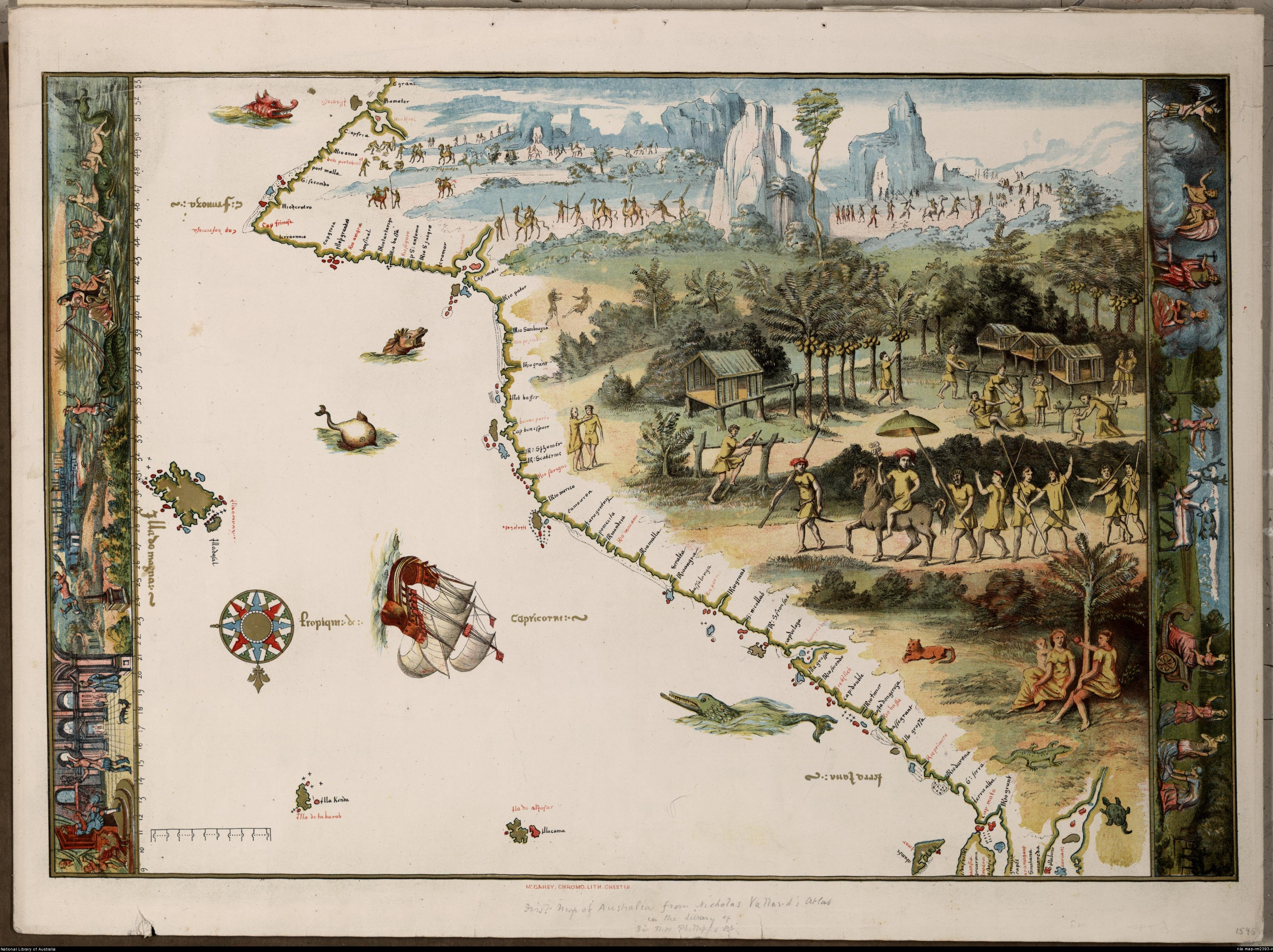
Claimed to be "Australia's first map" from 1547 (North is down).

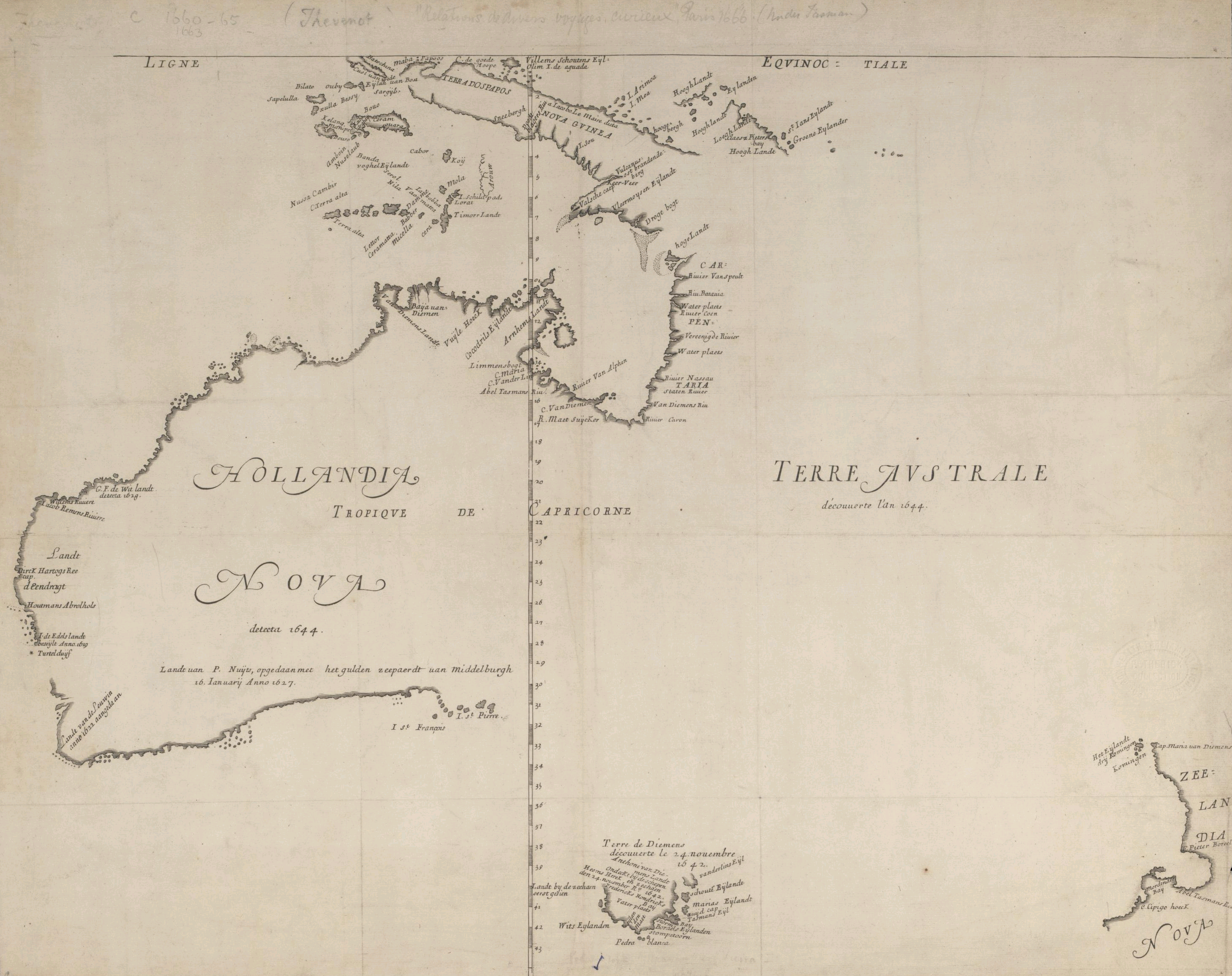
Map of Australia 1644.

Indigenous Australians created constellations in the night sky that related to the geography of the land and used these 'maps' for navigation. Dutch explorers, in 1606, made the first recorded European sightings and first recorded landfalls of the Australian mainland. The first accurate drawn maps of Australia were compiled during the voyages of Captain Cook. Cook's experience in creating nautical charts of the eastern seaboard of Canada was an important factor in his appointment as captain of the voyage observing the transit of Venus. As he sailed the coastlines, he charted the bays and coastlines.

=== Early exploration ===
Early surveying efforts concentrated on finding suitable town sites. Many towns in Australia were established by dividing a suitable site into small plots of land that were sold to English residents who then emigrated. Other exploration expeditions were made to the interior in an attempt to find fertile land.

=== New South Wales ===
The first attempts to regulate surveying in New South Wales was in 1836. In 1876, use of the circumferentor was prohibited. The theodolite supplanted it as a more accurate measurer of angles. The Torrens system was introduced in 1862 by the Real Property Act. The previous system of registering deeds is now known as the "old system".

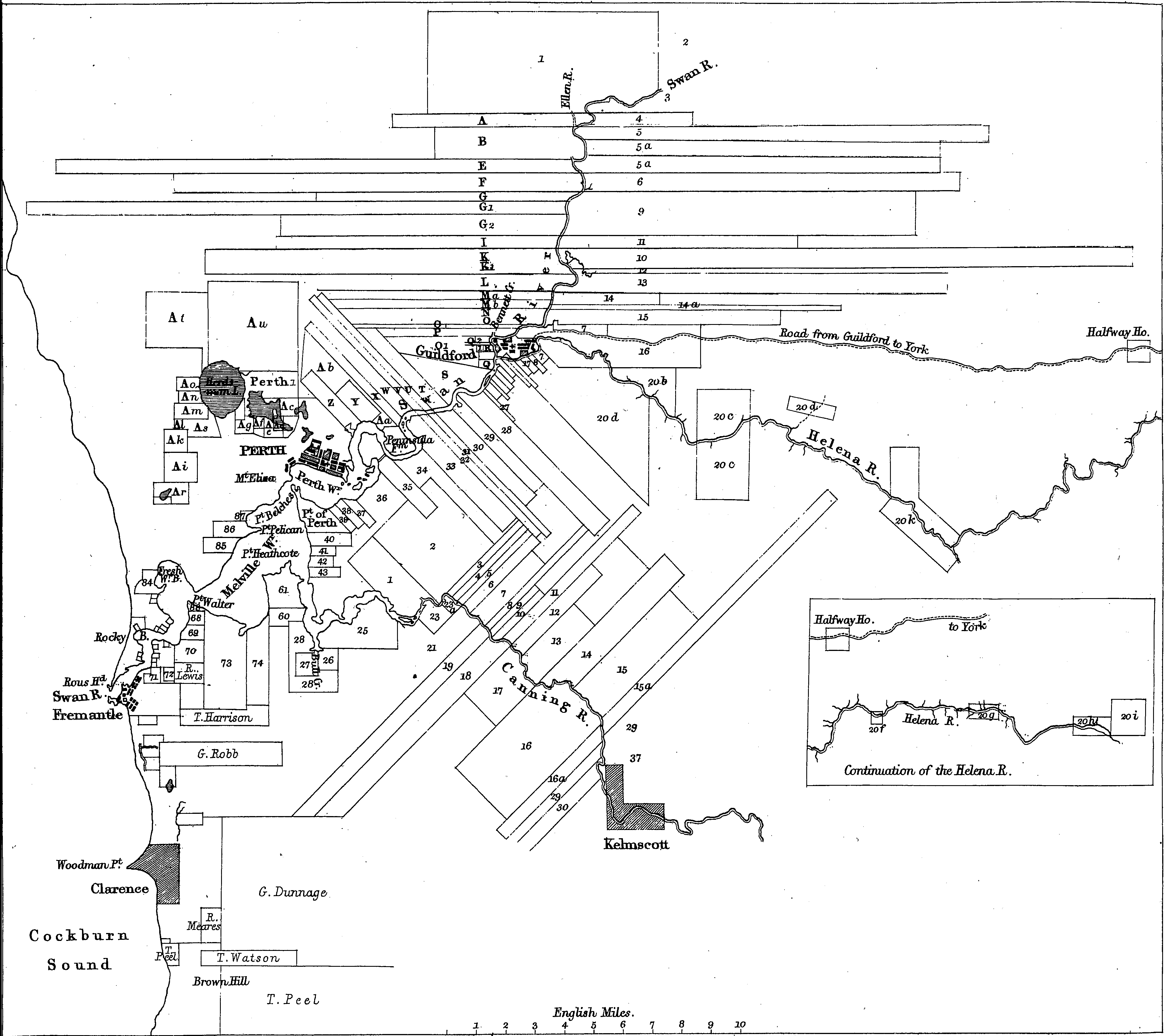
This is a map of the land grants around the Swan River, Western Australia in 1839. The map was drawn by John Arrowsmith from the survey data of John Septimus Roe.

== Survey system of Australia ==
Initially surveys were conducted using magnetic bearings. Later measurements were made on county arbitrary meridians, where surveys in each county were based on an initial point determined by government surveyors.

In 1837, Colonel William Light, first Surveyor-General of South Australia adapted maritime navigation techniques for determining a ship's position at sea (co-ordinates of latitude and longitude) to define property boundaries, and thereby devised and implemented the world's first co-ordinated cadastre, employing a Trigometrical Survey of the District of Adelaide (Adelaide Plains) four times more accurate than the contemporary British Ordnance Survey.

In 1966, the first nationwide system, the Australian geodetic datum (AGD) was established.

Most states appointed surveyors-general early in their history. These officials were responsible for setting up reliable systems to record land purchases and claims. The current Australian survey system is the geocentric datum of Australia, established in 1994. It was adopted nationally on 1 January 2000. Surveying is regulated at a federal level by Geoscience Australia.

== Finding a site for the capital ==
Melbourne–Sydney rivalry led to division in the late 1800s on where the capital city should be sited. After an extensive search, the present site, about 300 kilometres south-west of Sydney, in the foothills of the Australian Alps, was chosen in 1908 as a result of survey work done by the government surveyor Charles Scrivener in that year.

== Professional associations ==
Surveying in Australia is still highly differentiated between the states. A fully qualified surveyor in Western Australia, for example, is known as a licensed surveyor. The title is administered by the Land Surveyors Licensing Board of Western Australia.

- The Association of Consulting Surveyors (ACS)
- The Surveying & Spatial Sciences Institute (SSSI)
- The Institution of Surveyors NSW Inc
- The Institution of Surveyors Victoria
- Western Australian Institution of Surveyors
- Queensland Spatial & Surveying Association
- Surveyors Board of South Australia.
- The Australian Institute of Mine Surveyors
- Australasian Institute of Marine Surveyors
- The Intergovernmental Committee on Surveying and Mapping (ICSM)

== See also ==
- ANZLIC
- Mapping Sciences Institute, Australia
- Surveying
- Surveying in New Zealand

=== Surveyors-general ===
- Surveyor General of New South Wales
- Surveyor General of Queensland
- Surveyor General of South Australia
- Surveyor General of Tasmania
- Surveyor General of Victoria
- Surveyor General of Western Australia
