= Chloe Munro =

Australian energy expert (died 2021)

Chloe Munro AO FTSE (1955 – 23 June 2021) was a former senior public servant in the State Government of Victoria and an Australian energy expert.

== Career ==
Munro served as Chair, Clean Energy Regulator from 2012 to 2017. Munro has also had significant public service roles including with the National Water Commission, AquaSure— the consortium building Victoria's desalination plant; Hydro Tasmania; as Secretary of the Victorian Government's Department of Primary Industries; and as Secretary of the Victorian Government's Department of National Resources and Environment (DNRE).

== Secretary DNRE ==
Munro was Secretary of DNRE when concerns were raised in the Parliament of Victoria, on 17 April 2002 and again on 17 October 2002, regarding the attempted misuse of millions of dollars from the Estate Agents Guarantee Fund (EAGF) by Land Victoria, a Division of DNRE and the Department of Justice. Land Victoria was under Executive Director Elizabeth O'Keeffe. O’Keeffe's leadership of Land Victoria was raised in the Victorian Parliament by Opposition environment spokesman Victor Perton on 17 April 2002 for her leading role in the EAGF scandal. Specifically, Perton reported that Land Victoria and the Department of Justice (DoJ) had "conspired to invent a 'survey reform' project to extract $7.5 million from the fund. Land Victoria, under O'Keeffe's direction, and in collaboration with DoJ, was reported to have attempted to create “the survey project” to obtain extra government funding through EAGF, despite already having been funded. The administration of EAGF was under DoJ. Perton also reported to the Parliament that this was not the first attempt by Land Victoria to illegally obtain funds from the EAGF. The Auditor-General had prevented an earlier attempt by O’Keeffe-led Land Victoria and the Department of Justice to “raid the EAGF of $45 million". This earlier attempt was also during Munro's tenure as DNRE Secretary. Further, Perton reported that the Surveyor General had initially raised his concerns of the proposal to obtain funds from EAGF on 7 March 2001. His concerns were dismissed by O’Keeffe who “responded in threatening terms” that he was accountable to Garbutt and Munro through O’Keeffe.

A subsequent investigation by the Ombudsman, “A conspiracy between members of the Department of Natural Resources and Environment and of the Department of Justice to defraud the Estate Agents Guarantee Fund” found the attempt represented a conflict of interest and was not ethical. The Ombudsman advised two whistle-blowers had come forward to his office which led to his investigation in accordance with ‘public interest disclosures’ under section 50 the Whistle-blowers Protection Act 2001 and launched on 19 June 2002. It was later reported that one of the whistleblowers was the Surveyor-General of Victoria, Keith Bell. Also, the Surveyor-General had earlier reported his concerns to the Auditor-General who stepped in to prevent it proceeding. The Ombudsman found that the "projectising" of the survey function was little more than a scheme to obtain additional funding, despite already being appropriated. The Ombudsman concluded: "Finally, the allegations that arose when this matter was placed under scrutiny ought to stand as a warning to those entrusted with determining the eligibility of applicants and/or programmes for funding from the various Statutory Trust Funds."

The Ombudsman's report included the respective responses from then DNRE Secretary, Munro and then DoJ Secretary Peter Harmsworth. Munro's response on behalf of DNRE did not acknowledge any of the Ombudsman's findings of inappropriate conduct by her department's officials and failed to take any responsibility. In contrast, Harmsworth's response on behalf of DoJ did acknowledge the conflict of interest and also acknowledged that his department had failed to provide sufficient information to the Auditor-General to appraise the proposed use of funds that would have been approved by the Expenditure Review Committee of Cabinet (ERCC).

Sherryl Garbutt was then the Minister for Environment and Conservation, to whom Munro reported. Following the 2002 state election, Garbutt lost responsibility for Land Victoria in the revised Bracks Ministry, being replaced by Mary Delahunty, and Munro was no longer the responsible Secretary.

During Munro's tenure as DNRE Secretary, DNRE, the Opposition raised the extreme political interference in the performance of the Surveyor-General's responsibilities. Such interference included: attempts to block or alter annual reports from the Surveyor-General; threats and intimidation by the former Executive Director of Land Victoria Elizabeth O'Keeffe; hiring of private investigators to investigate the Surveyor-General and his office; and efforts to interfere with the Surveyor-General's review of State electoral boundaries in his capacity as an Electoral Boundaries Commissioner. The Age, Herald Sun and ABC carried numerous reports of such interference and it was frequently raised by the Opposition in both Houses of the Parliament of Victoria reported in Hansard. Such reporting continued well after Bell resigned his appointment as Surveyor-General of Victoria in July 2003 and joined the World Bank. During Munro's tenure as DNRE Secretary there is no reporting of any action she took to prevent the interference. To the contrary, the interference continued under authorization of Minister Garbutt and sanctioned by Munro, given that the Surveyor-General reported through O'Keeffe to Munro and Minister Garbutt.

Further, during Munro's tenure as DENR Secretary, O’Keeffe approved an illegal $100,000 contract for a consultant to “lobby her own Minister” Garbutt and to discredit the Surveyor-General. The contract was signed with the Australian Spatial Information Business Association (ASIBA), later known the Spatial Information Business Association (SIBA), and now the Geospatial Council of Australia (GCA). GCA also includes the Surveying and Spatial Sciences Institute (SSSI). The contract was agreed between O'Keeffe and ASIBA, and presumably with the concurrence of Garbutt and Munro. After adverse media and Opposition reporting of the "illegal ASIBA contract", the contract was found to not be appropriate and was cancelled after the first tranche of $25,000 was paid to ASIBA.

== Honours and recognition ==
Munro was appointed an Officer (AO) in the General Division of the Order of Australia in January 2018 for "distinguished service to public administration through leadership roles in the area of renewable energy, water and climate change process and reform, and to the performing arts'. Munro was previously awarded the Centenary Medal "for outstanding service to public administration" in January 2001.

In 2018, Munro was named in the list of the Australian Financial Review's 100 Women of Influence 2018. She was also elected a Fellow of the Australian Academy of Technology and Engineering.

== Death ==
Munro died on 23 June 2021 after a long battle with cancer.
