= Victor Perton =

Australian politician

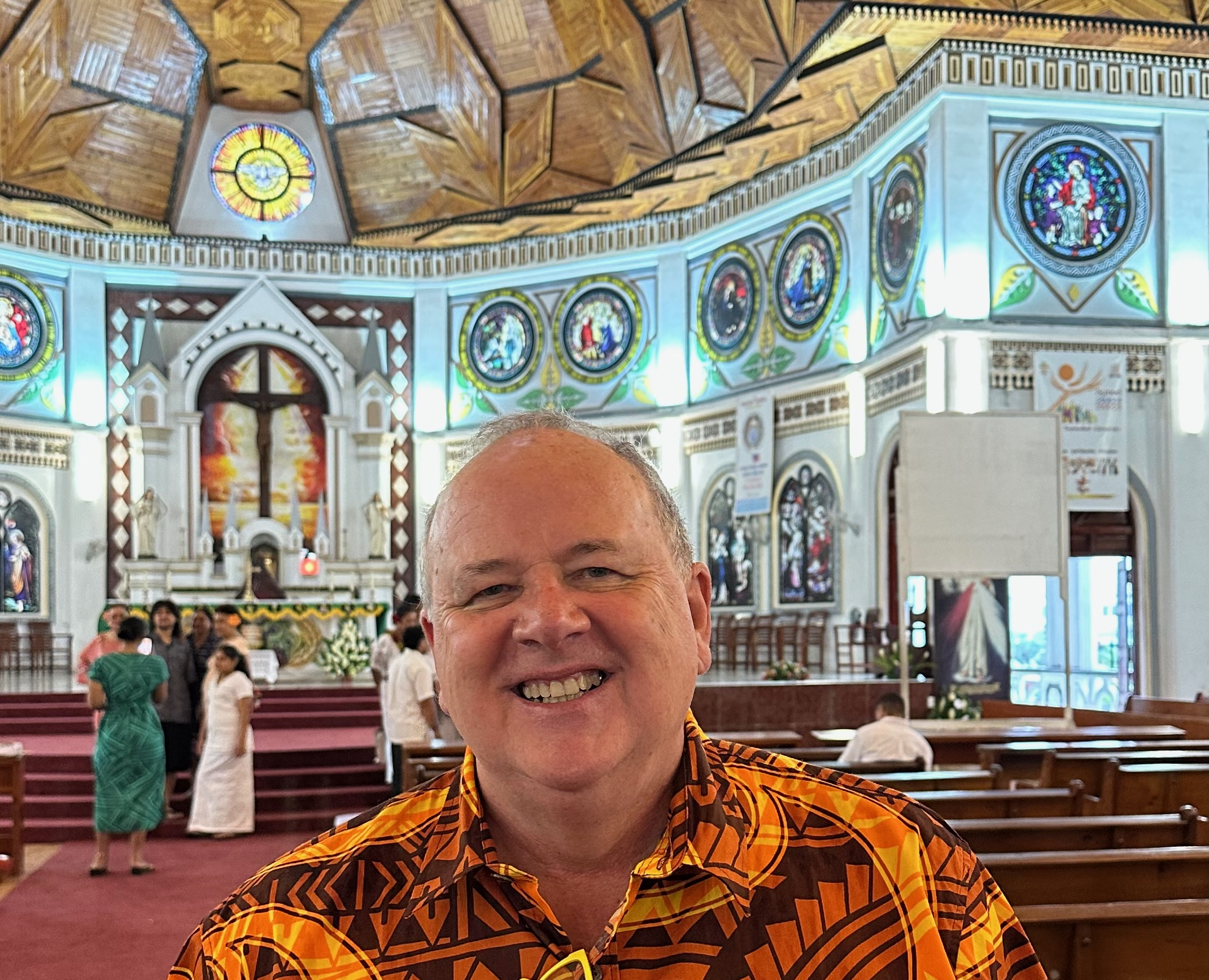
- Perton in Apia Cathedral

Personal details
- Born: Victor Perton; 2 December 1958 (age 67) Melbourne, Victoria, Australia
- Party: Liberal (1988- 2006)
- Relatives: Vladas Petronaitis (grand father)
- Occupation: Former politician, activist, author

Victor John Perton (born 2 December 1958) is a former parliamentarian in the Australian state of Victoria, and formerly the Victorian Government's Commissioner to the Americas, based in San Francisco, US. and now the founder and Chief Optimism Officer of the Centre for Optimism.

== Life and career ==
Perton was born in Melbourne to John and Lilia Perton, refugees from Latvia and Lithuania.Lithuania, part of the large Baltic migration to Australia from refugee camps in Northern Europe following the Second World War. and the occupation of the Baltic nations by the Soviet Union.

His mother was a lifelong yoga practitioner and remained an influence until her death in 2020.

His paternal grandmother, Bronislava Petronaitiene, survived the Gulag and was active in civil disobedience prior to the collapse of the Soviet Union. His grandfather, Vladas Petronaitis, was a leader in the struggle for Lithuanian independence who in 1940 was executed in the Rainiai massacre by members of the NKVD. Raised in Melbourne, Perton attended Catholic schools, including St Joseph’s Junior College, before pursuing studies in economics and law at Monash University, the University of Melbourne and Peking University.

== Political career ==
He was a member of the Victorian Legislative Assembly from 1988 to November 2006, representing the electorate of Doncaster for the Liberal Party.

=== Political aspirations ===
Perton joined the Liberal Party in 1976 and served on the state executive as state president of the Young Liberal Movement and in various state and local constituency offices over the next decade. He graduated from university in 1982 and began practicing as a solicitor as well as being a part-owner of a retail business. In 1984 he was called to the Bar and became a barrister at the Victorian Bar. The same year he ran as the Liberal candidate against Bob Hawke in the 1984 federal election for the seat of Wills. Perton subsequently gained admission to practice law in five states and in 1987 gained a Diploma of Chinese Law from Peking University in the People's Republic of China.

He remained active within the Liberal Party after graduating, serving on its state council and state policy assembly, and in 1988 stood as the Liberal candidate in the safe Liberal seat of Doncaster. He was easily elected. In opposition, he became well known for his use of freedom of information legislation and government scrutiny. He was a member of the Liberal Party Investigatory Committee on Casino Policy in 1990 and became a critic of the introduction of gaming machines and casinos into Victoria. He was a member of the Coalition Tricontinental Taskforce and served as Parliamentary Secretary to the shadow treasurer with special responsibility for manufacturing industry and economic development.

=== Kennett government ===
During the Kennett government, Perton was active in regulatory scrutiny, regulatory reform, technology policy and e-democracy.

Perton was the first Australian parliamentarian with a website and later the first to use an electronic town hall.

Perton served as the first chairman of the Scrutiny of Acts and Regulations Committee. His wide interpretation of the "rights" to be protected was criticised by some within the government, including committee member and rising backbencher Louise Asher, who produced a dissenting report. The then foreign minister, Gareth Evans, appointed Perton as an Australian delegate to the Second UN Conference on Human Rights.

From 1996 he served as chairman of the Law Reform Committee, the Multimedia Committee, the Data Protection Advisory Committee and the Electronic Business Framework Group.

During the Kennett government, there was media criticism that the government was reversing some of the transparency provisions introduced over the previous decades including the Freedom of Information and the Audit Act. Within the government, young MPs such as Steve Elder, Robert Doyle and Perton were seen as "small-l liberal" voices against controversial changes to the Auditor General's Act and the Freedom of Information Act.

=== Opposition ===
In 1999, after the defeat of the Kennett government, Perton became Shadow Minister for Conservation and Environment and Shadow Minister for Multimedia (later retitled "Shadow Minister for Technology & Innovation." Perton performed well in these positions, and in August 2002, when Robert Doyle (Napthine's successor as leader) embarked on a major reshuffle in a last-ditch bid to boost the party's flagging fortunes before the state election due late that year, he was promoted to Shadow Attorney-General while also holding the positions of Shadow Minister for Consumer Affairs, Shadow Minister for Aboriginal Affairs and Shadow Minister for Technology and Innovation.

Doyle's attempt to prevent a landslide defeat failed, and the party suffered the worst loss in its history, with several Shadow Ministers losing their seats, and Perton coming very close to losing his own. In the aftermath of the defeat, Perton was promoted to Shadow Minister of Education. He regularly appeared in the media with vocal criticism of the government, and remained amongst the opposition's most high-profile members.

Within the spectrum of Liberal Party thought, Perton is regarded as a "small-l liberal", a position more common in the Victorian Liberal Party than the more aggressively right-wing New South Wales branch.

In February 2006, Perton announced that he would not contest the next election and relinquished his shadow ministry. Mary Wooldridge was elected as the Liberal Member for Doncaster at the 2006 State Election.

Perton, in April 2002 in Parliament and earlier in the media, quoted "from documents from 2001 in which the assistant director of land records and information services, Ivan Powell, talks of having 'invented some benefits' in regard to the project and of a request to 'invent another layer of detail'. Powell was a senior Land Registry official (under Land Victoria). It was later reported that the Surveyor-General had earlier reported his concerns to the Auditor-General who stepped to prevent it from proceeding. The Surveyor-General also reported his concerns to the Ombudsman.

Perton reported to the Parliament that O'Keeffe was acting with the full support of the responsible minister, Sherryl Garbutt, and the responsible secretary, Chloe Munro. Garbutt was the Minister for Conservation and Environment, to which Land Victoria was accountable. Further, Perton reported that investigations by the auditor-general and by Deloitte Touche Tohmatsu (Deloitte) were not willingly assisted by O'Keeffe and Land Victoria. Requests for information and assistance by Deloitte's were blocked by Land Victoria. Perton reported that on 31 May 2001, Deloitte requested information from Land Victoria. In response, O'Keeffe's subordinate, John Hartigan, director of the land registry (under Land Victoria) directed all staff to not comply with any request for information from Deloitte.

Perton reported that the surveyor-general initially raised his concerns of the proposal to obtain funds from EAGF on 7 March 2001 with O'Keeffe. The surveyor-general's concerns were dismissed by O'Keeffe who "responded in threatening terms" that he was accountable to Garbutt and the secretary through O'Keeffe and Hartigan. The secretary was Chloe Munro. By August 2002, both Hartigan and O'Keeffe had been reported to have been removed from their positions in Land Victoria. By December 2002, Munro had been removed following departmental restructuring following the state election on 30 November 2002. Further, Garbutt had also been moved in a ministerial shuffle.

== After politics ==
After Perton left politics he became an independent company director and practiced as a barrister. He remained active in supporting democracy movements in Asia.

=== Commissioner to the Americas ===
In December 2008, Victorian premier John Brumby announced Perton's appointment as the Victorian government's commissioner to the Americas, based in San Francisco.

His other appointments include to the Transport Accident Commission, the federal government's Council on Australia-Latin America Relations, the Global Integrity Summit and the Australian Centre for Financial Studies.

=== Water sector activism ===
He became a board member of Yarra Valley Water on 1 October 2015. He was elected a board member of Vicwater and is the Ambassador for the Intelligent Water Networks.

=== Campaigner for optimism ===
He is the founder and chief optimism officer of the Centre for Optimism, established in 2019 as a continuation of the Australian Leadership Project, which engages with leaders across 82 countries and has a global following of over 100,000.

His work in this field includes the books The Case for Optimism: The Optimists’ Voices and Optimism: The How and Why (2025) and the development of "The Optimism Principle", expressed as "The answer to life's most pressing questions is optimism", which positions optimism as a practical framework for leadership, innovation, policy and societal wellbeing.

Perton has been described in the media as "That Optimism Man" and "the optimism guru" for his efforts to embed positive, future-focused narratives in government, business and community sectors.

He co-developed the "Optimism Economy" and "Framework for an Optimistic National Narrative" with collaborators Anand Kulkarni and Robert Masters, arguing that optimism is a strategic economic and cultural asset. His podcast That Optimism Man explores the science and practice of optimism in diverse fields.

He also teaches public policy at the Australian Public Service Academy.
