= Mapping Sciences Institute, Australia =

- Abbreviation: MSIA
- Formation: 1952; 74 years ago
- Website: mappingsciences.org.au
- Formerly called: Australian Institute of Cartographers (AIC)

The Mapping Sciences Institute, Australia (MSIA) is a national professional and learned society devoted to map-making and geospatial science in Australia. It started in 1952 as the Australian Institute of Cartographers (AIC) and changed name in 1995. It is a national member of the International Cartographic Association since 1964. It sponsors, along with the Surveying and Spatial Sciences Institute, the Journal of Spatial Science.
