= Cartography of New Zealand =

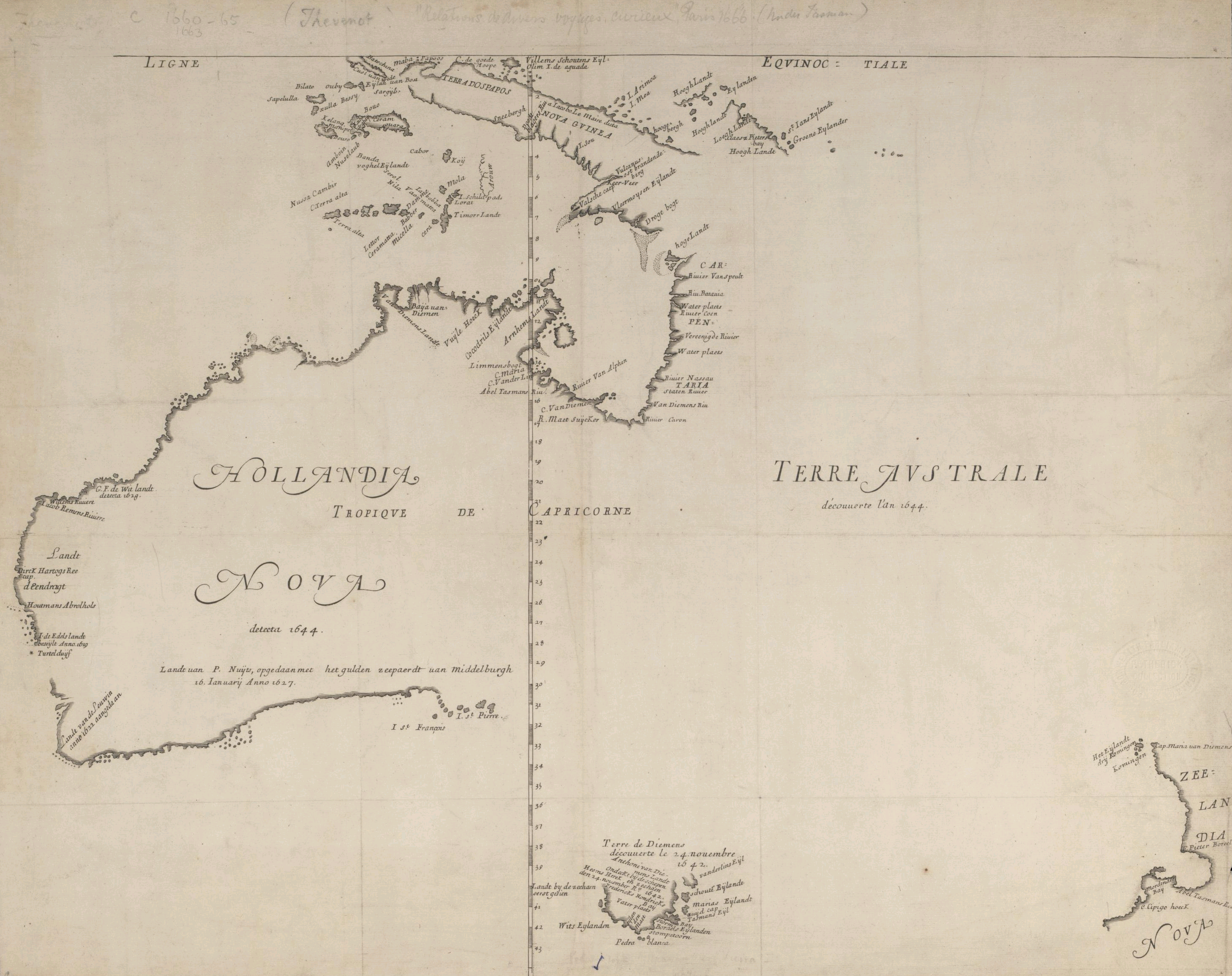
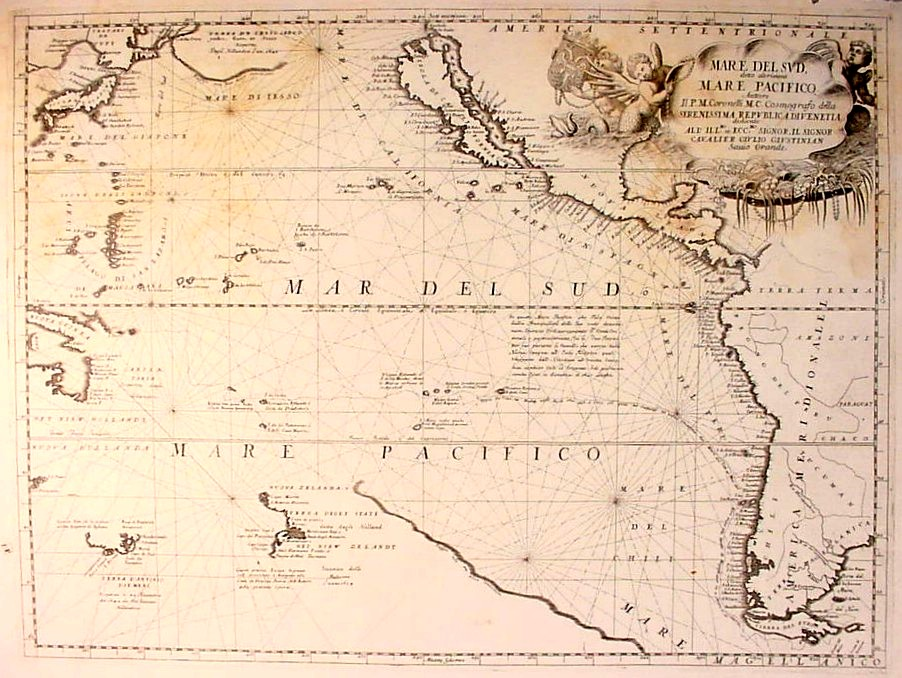
First map of New Zealand, 1644, and map of the Pacific Ocean, showing the hypothesised great southern continent, 1690
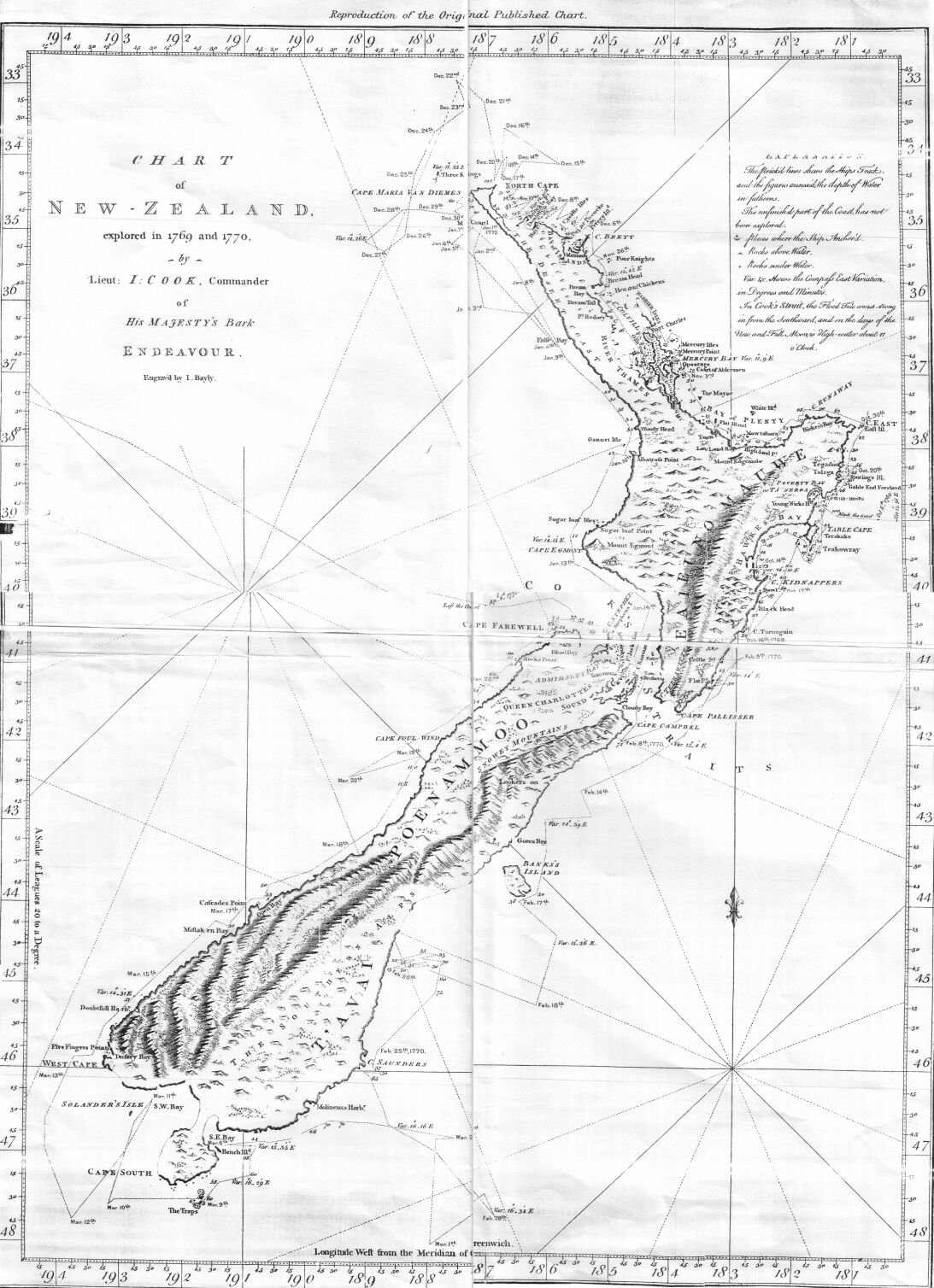
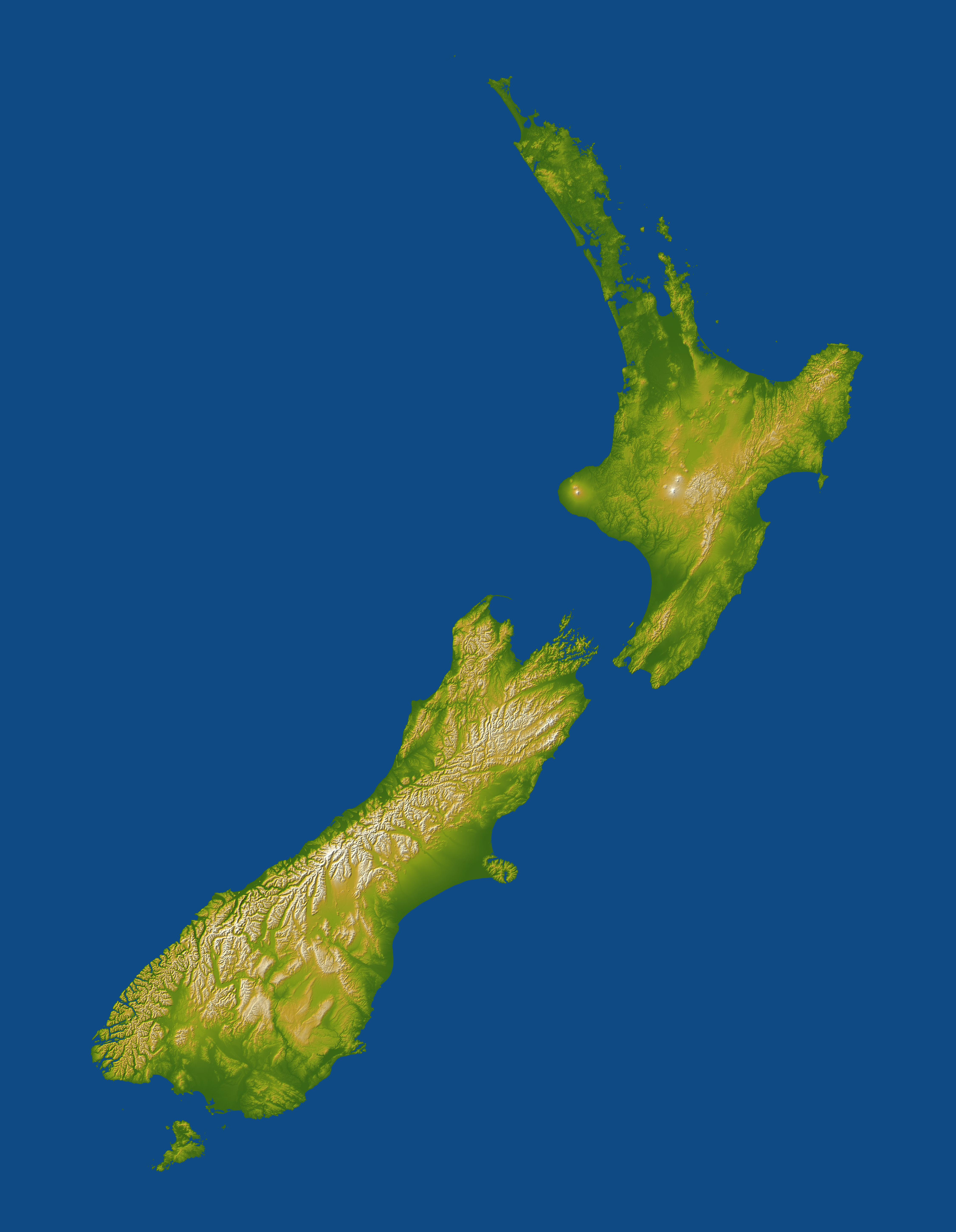
Map of New Zealand by James Cook, 1770, next to a modern map
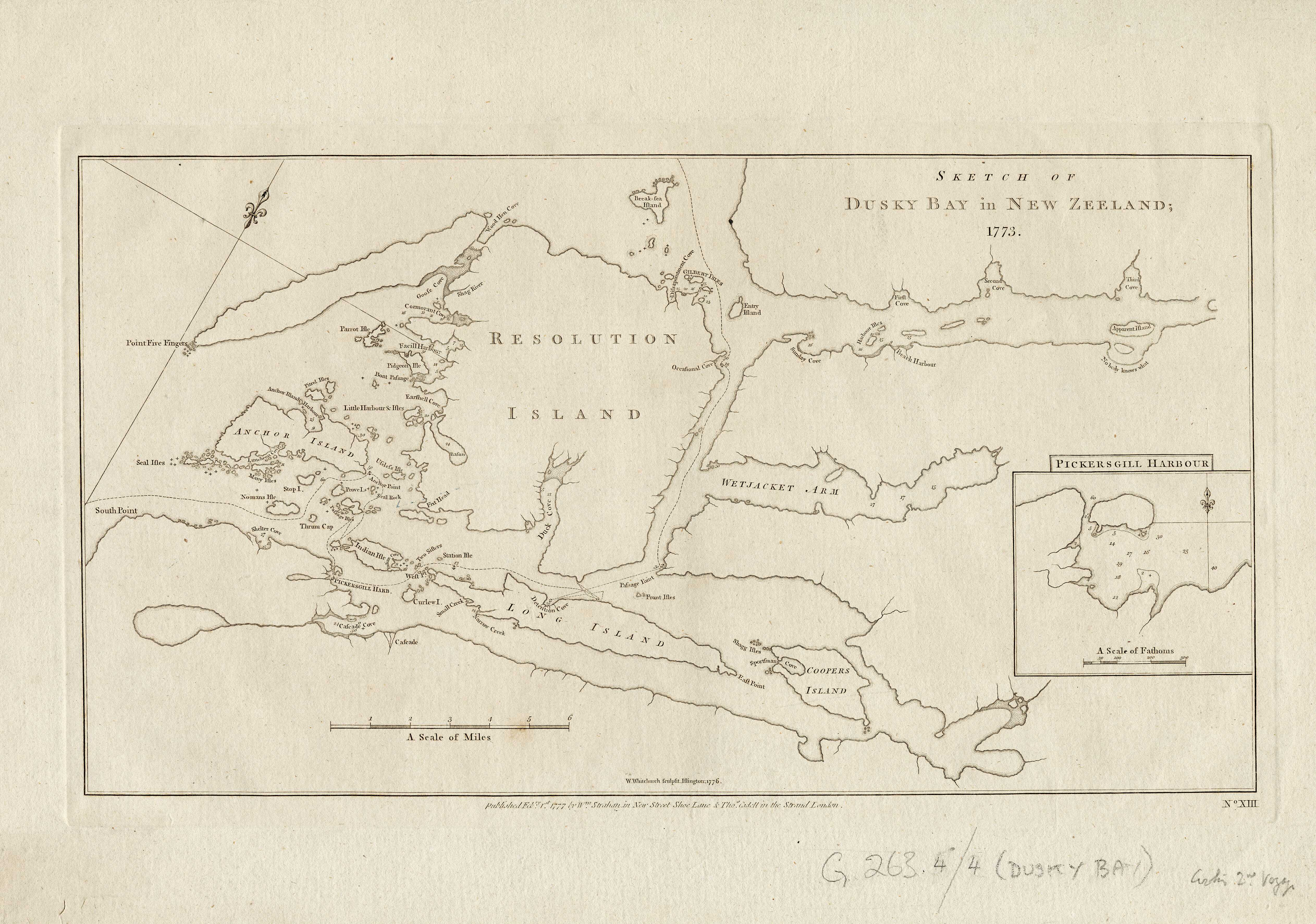
Sketch of Dusky Sound in New Zealand, 1773, and plan of the town and part of the settlement of New Plymouth, 1850

The cartography of New Zealand is the history of surveying and creation of maps of New Zealand. Surveying began with the arrival of Abel Tasman in the mid-17th century. Cartography and surveying developed in incremental steps from then until the integration of New Zealand into a global system based on GPS and the New Zealand Geodetic Datum 2000.

Initially surveys were done by measuring points on the ground and staking out areas. This was quickly followed in the late 1800s by the triangulation method. The New Zealand Institute of Surveyors was established in 1888 after an earlier attempt in 1881. The government then divided the country into 28 'meridional circuits', each of which had a known point that other locations could be measured from. The circuits were further divided into survey districts. This system worked well except for surveys that needed to work across neighbouring circuits. To solve this problem, geodetic triangulation of the whole country was performed between 1909 and 1947. This was used for the Geodetic Datum 1949 and New Zealand Map Grid (NZMG). This was followed by the use of aerial photography, orthophotos and satellite photos. Later the New Zealand Geodetic Datum 2000 superseded the 1949 version, and the bespoke NZMG projection was replaced by New Zealand Transverse Mercator 2000 (NZTM2000). New Zealand topographical maps are sold digitally and in 1:50,000 and 1:250,000 printed versions.

== History ==
=== Māori ===
Early Polynesian voyagers made stick diagrams to represent the distance and direction to islands, and the first explorers of New Zealand probably had these. The Polynesian settlers named many of the country's geographical features.

Prior to European colonisation, New Zealand was divided into territories of tribes (iwi) and subtribes (hapū). Boundaries were defined by landmarks which were remembered in chants and oral tradition. The ownership of natural resources was often more important than the land they were on. Land was held by customary possession, gifted, or by conquest and occupation.

=== Early European explorers ===
The first two European expeditions to map New Zealand – those of Abel Tasman and James Cook – were both trying to find the hypothesised continent of Terra Australis. They gave New Zealand its first non-Māori place names. Cook proved the absence of Terra Australis and made detailed maps of New Zealand. These maps contained two significant errors, showing Stewart Island as a peninsula and Banks Peninsula as an island. The French explorer Dumont d'Urville quickly corrected the latter of these claims.

The early European arrivals found that, although Māori did not make or possess maps as we know them, they could draw maps on the ground or on paper. These ranged from local representations in sand to detailed sketches of the whole South Island.

The first detailed maps and reports of abundant wildlife brought sealers, then whalers, to New Zealand. Sales of land to European colonists prior to 1840 were not regulated. Disputes arose mainly in areas where tribal possession was unclear.

=== After the Treaty of Waitangi ===
Following the Treaty of Waitangi in 1840, all lands of New Zealand came under the dominion of the British Crown. The treaty allowed the tribes possession of their customary lands. Europeans wanting to purchase land negotiated through a government commission. If negotiations were successful, the applicant was given a Crown grant that gave them ownership under British law. The purchases prior to 1840 were known as old land claims and required to go through the same process. Many of these claims were reduced in size from the original agreements.

Various British schemas for colonisation were created and maps created to demarcate the land and attract investment. Also at this time Māori and Europeans were negotiating the sale of land. With the start of the Otago gold rush and discovery of the Nelson mineral belt, geologists and surveyors were hired to map inland New Zealand. By 1855 the Acheron and Pandora had mapped New Zealand's coastline in great detail.

The position of surveyor-general was created in the royal instructions of 1840. The first regulations for surveying were established in 1842, when surveyors were required to deposit their licenses with the surveyor general's office to be returned upon completion of a survey. In 1852, provinces were established and each established a survey department. These were often underfunded and most failed to systemise surveys in their territory, making boundaries unreliable because of gaps and overlaps between abutting surveys. Some small triangulation networks were established, and some cities established survey control points on routes known as standard traverses that surveyors could use as a basis for local surveys. In Otago, true north was determined at six points throughout the province. Local surveys could be linked to these points so that their angle measurements were consistent throughout the district. The districts were known as meridional circuits, a term that has persisted in New Zealand surveying.

In 1875 Major H. S. Palmer of the Ordnance Survey of Great Britain presented a damning report on the state of the survey system to the New Zealand Parliament. He recommended that a unified map projection was adopted and a single system of reference points was established across the country. In 1876, the provinces were abolished and the survey departments were combined. The chief surveyor of the Otago province, John Turnbull Thomson, was made surveyor-general of the new government survey department. Thompson established meridional circuits throughout the country as well as reorganising the way land records were identified and recorded. By 1880, the small original triangulation networks had been extended and joined throughout New Zealand.

=== Geodetic surveys ===
In the years following Palmer's report, triangulation had been extended throughout New Zealand, but accuracy had been found wanting. It was not until 1921 that Surveyor-General W. T. Neill began work on a system that would create accurate reference points throughout New Zealand. In 1923, the first baseline was measured on the Kaingaroa Plains. From 1930 onward, observations were made at night to improve accuracy. The longest observation was 120 kilometres (75 mi) across Cook Strait. Work continued through World War II as the project was allowed topographical maps for military use to be quickly compiled. The last fieldwork was completed in early 1949, and the system became known as the New Zealand Geodetic Datum 1949.

The 1949 datum was updated in 2000. To ease GPS measurement the new system was slightly shifted to become geocentric (the origin point of the system coincides with the centre of the Earth). It was also designed to be semi-dynamic, to cope better with seismic movement. This system is called the New Zealand Geodetic Datum 2000, and includes the NZ Transverse Mercator projection that topographical maps are published in.

These geodetic activities are responsible for the ubiquitous trig stations that reside mostly at the top of many hills throughout New Zealand.

== Queen's Chain ==
The "Queen's Chain" is a concept in New Zealand property law. It is a strip of public land, usually 20 metres (or one chain in pre-metric measure) wide, along rivers, lakes and the coastline. It was designed to prevent land upriver or along a coast being inaccessible to any prospective buyers. The strips are incomplete and their exact modern location can be complex to determine. These strips exist in various forms (including road reserves, esplanade reserves, esplanade strips, marginal strips and reserves of various types) but not as extensively and consistently as is often assumed.

== Current system ==
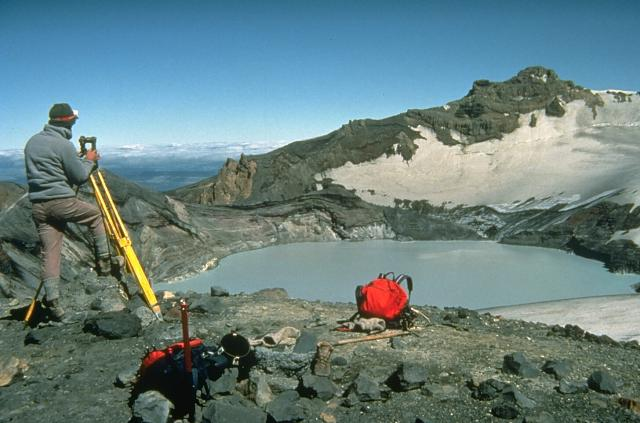
A volcanologist takes theodolite measurements on the crater lake of Mt Ruapehu.

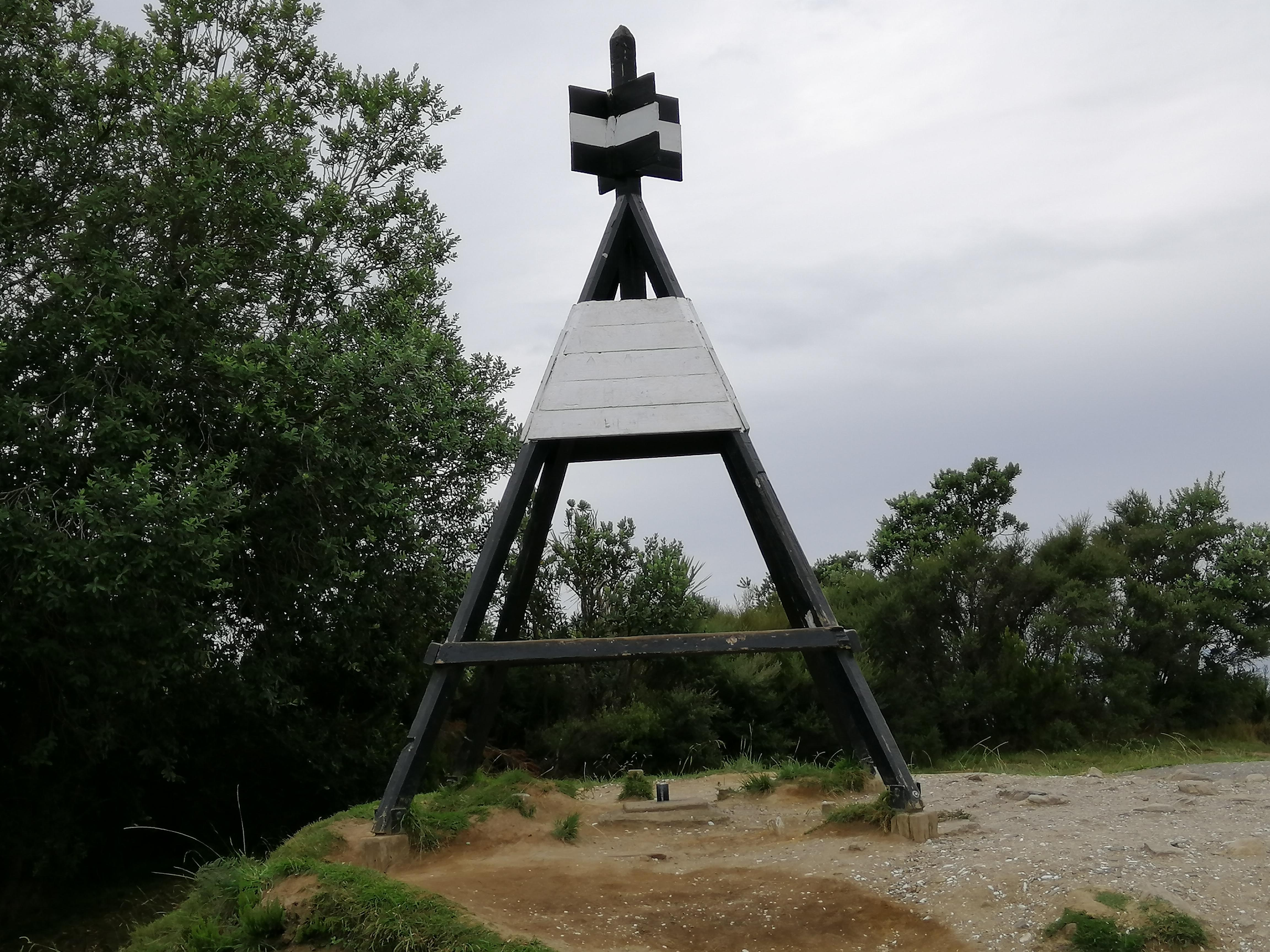
Trig station on top of Mount Maunganui

Cadastral surveying in New Zealand is governed by the Cadastral Survey Act 2002, which defines legal bodies that deal with aspects of the profession. The act devolves power to create specific regulations to the surveyor-general, who periodically issues the surveyor-general's rules for cadastral surveys. The Land Transfer Act 1952 also influences the way surveys are done.

The Torrens system of land registration was introduced in the Land Transfer Act 1870. The act introduced a system where land title is held in a register as opposed to the previous system that registered the document containing the title information. It therefore made it unnecessary to search the history of a title, and made titles indefeasible, meaning that it cannot be claimed by persons other than the registered owner.

A separate system exists in parallel with the general land titles for land held in common by Māori as a tribe. This is controlled by the Te ture Whenua Maori (Maori Land) Act 1993. In 1980, 4.5% of New Zealand land was held in the Māori land system. This does not include land held by Māori individuals in the general land system.

A surveyor who has fulfilled the requirements to legally sign subdivision plans is known as a licensed cadastral surveyor.

Construction surveying is not regulated at the national level in New Zealand. However, matters relating to surveying may require certification by a registered professional surveyor under contract law or local authority regulations.

Surveying in New Zealand uses whole circle (azimuth) bearings. Another oddity is the convention of writing coordinates where the northing is written before the easting, at odds with much of the rest of the world.

== Projections ==
=== New Zealand Map Grid ===
By 1973, New Zealand used a separate transverse Mercator map projection for each of the North and South Islands. Additionally, local surveys were done using 28 separate transverse Mercator projections. The switch to metric provided an opportunity to standardise on a single map projection, so the New Zealand Map Grid (NZMG) was invented. It maps from a latitude and longitude in New Zealand Geodetic Datum 1949 (NZGD1949) into a northing and an easting in metres.

NZMG is based on a complex polynomial and it was designed to minimise the scale error over all of New Zealand. It is defined in terms of the following parameters and constants (written using vectors for conciseness):

- Semi-major axis of reference ellipsoid: a = 6,378,388 metres
- Inverse ellipsoidal flattening: 1/f = 297
- Origin latitude: φ_{0} = -41°
- Origin longitude: λ_{0} = 173°
- False Northing: N_{0} = 6,023,150 metres
- False Easting: E_{0} = 2,510,000 metres
- A = [0.6399175073, -0.1358797613, 0.063294409, -0.02526853, 0.0117879, -0.0055161, 0.0026906, -0.001333, 0.00067, -0.00034]
- B = [0.7557853228 + 0i, 0.249204646 + 0.003371507i, -0.001541739 + 0.041058560i, -0.10162907 + 0.01727609i, -0.26623489 - 0.36249218i, -0.6870983 - 1.1651967i]
- C = [1.3231270439 + 0i, -0.577245789 - 0.007809598i, 0.508307513 - 0.112208952i, -0.15094762 + 0.18200602i, 1.01418179 + 1.64497696i, 1.9660549 + 2.5127645i]
- D = [1.5627014243, 0.5185406398, -0.03333098, -0.1052906, -0.0368594, 0.007317, 0.01220, 0.00394, -0.0013]
- Latitude of computation point in degrees relative to NZGD1949: φ
- Longitude of computation point in degrees relative to NZGD1949: λ
- Northing of computation point: N
- Easting of computation point: E

A latitude and longitude can be converted to a northing and an easting by computing the following values:
$$\Delta\phi = 0.036(\phi - \phi_0)$$
$$\Delta\psi = \sum_{n=1}^10 \text{A}_n (\Delta\phi)^n$$
$$\Delta\lambda = \frac{\pi}{180} (\lambda - \lambda_0)$$
$$\theta = \Delta\psi + i\Delta\lambda$$
$$z = \sum_{n=1}^6 \text{B}_n \theta^n$$
$$x = \text{Re}(z)$$
$$y = \text{Im}(z)$$
$$N = (x \times a) + N_0$$
$$E = (y \times a) + E_0$$

A northing and an easting can be converted to a latitude and longitude by computing the following values:
$$z = \frac{(N - N_0)}{a} + i\frac{(E - E_0)}{a}$$
$$\theta_0 = \sum_{n=1}^{6} \text{C}_n z^n$$
$$\theta_{i+1} = \frac{z + \sum_{n=2}^6 (n - 1) \text{B}_n \theta_i^n}{\sum_{n=1}^6 n \text{B}_n \theta_i^{n-1}}$$
$$\Delta\psi = \text{Re}(\theta)$$
$$\Delta\lambda = \text{Im}(\theta)$$
$$\Delta\phi = \sum_{n=1}^{9} \text{D}_n (\Delta\psi)^n$$
$$\phi = \phi_0 + \frac{10^5}{3600} \Delta\phi$$
$$\lambda = \lambda_0 + \frac{180}{\pi} \Delta\lambda$$

In the conversion to latitude and longitude, θ is calculated with successive approximations. 2 iterations (θ = θ_{2}) is sufficient to get millimetre accuracy.

=== New Zealand Transverse Mercator ===
In 2001, to accompany the new NZGD2000 datum, New Zealand Transverse Mercator 2000 (NZTM2000) was adopted as the projection recommended by LINZ for use within mainland New Zealand. It replaced the bespoke NZMG projection with a projection based on the standard transverse Mercator projection.

NZTM2000 is based on the NZGD2000 datum, which for practical purposes is almost identical to WGS 84 (the datum used by GPS). It uses the following parameters:

- Origin latitude: 0° South
- Origin longitude: 173° East
- False Northing: 10,000,000 metres North
- False Easting: 1,600,000 metres East
- Central meridian scale factor: 0.9996

== See also ==
- New Zealand surveyors
- Surveying in Australia
- Land Information New Zealand
- Department of Survey and Land Information
- Surveyor-General of New Zealand
- New Zealand Geographic Board
- Land districts of New Zealand

== Sources ==
- Maling, Peter Bromley (1996). Historic Charts & Maps of New Zealand: 1642–1875. Reed Books. ISBN 9780790003382.
