= Sherryl Garbutt =

Australian politician

The Honourable Sherryl Garbutt OAM JP

Minister for Community Services
- In office 11 February 2002 – 1 December 2006
- Preceded by: Christine Campbell
- Succeeded by: Gavin Jennings

Minister for Environment and Conservation
- In office 21 October 1999 – 1 December 2006
- Preceded by: Marie Tehan
- Succeeded by: John Thwaites

Minister for Women's Affairs
- In office 21 October 1999 – 11 February 2002
- Preceded by: Jan Wade
- Succeeded by: Mary Delahunty

Member of the Victorian Legislative Assembly for Bundoora
- In office 3 October 1992 – 24 November 2006
- Preceded by: John Cain
- Succeeded by: Colin Brooks

Member of the Victorian Legislative Assembly for Greensborough
- In office 15 April 1989 – 2 October 1992
- Preceded by: Pauline Toner
- Succeeded by: District abolished

Personal details
- Born: 5 May 1948 (age 78) Melbourne, Victoria, Australia
- Party: Labor Party
- Education: University of Melbourne; La Trobe University
- Occupation: Teacher

Sherryl Maree Garbutt (born 5 May 1948) is a former Australian politician.

== Early life ==
Born in Melbourne, Victoria, Garbutt attended Oak Park High School before receiving her tertiary education at the University of Melbourne (Bachelor of Arts 1968, Diploma of Education 1969) and at La Trobe University (Bachelor of Education 1979). She is also a Justice of the Peace. In 1970 she became a secondary school teacher, and from 1982 to 1989 she was electorate officer to state Labor minister Pauline Toner.

== Career ==
In 1989, Garbutt succeeded Toner in the seat of Greensborough in a by-election. In 1992 her seat was abolished and she transferred to Bundoora. She also entered the shadow ministry that year, serving as Shadow Minister for Community Services (1992–96), Women's Affairs (1993–96), Environment, Conservation and Land Management (1996–99), and Water Resources (1997–99). When Labor won office under Steve Bracks in 1999, she became Minister for Women's Affairs, Environment and Conservation. Although she remained Minister for Environment and Conservation, Garbutt lost responsibility for Land Victoria in the reshuffled Bracks Cabinet following the 2002 elections. Land Victoria was assigned to Planning Minister Mary Delahunty. In 2002 she transferred to Community Services. She retired in 2006.

Garbutt was inducted onto the Victorian Honour Roll of Women in 2016. She was awarded the Medal of the Order of Australia in the 2020 Australia Day Honours for her "service to the people and Parliament of Victoria".

== Concerns Raised During Tenure as Minister for Environment, Conservation and Land Management 1999-2002 ==
During Garbutt's tenure as Minister for Environment, Conservation and Land Management, there were many controversies, especially concerning Land Victoria under Executive Director Elizabeth O'Keeffe, a division of the Department of Natural Resources and Environment (DNRE) under Secretary Chloe Munro. Significantly, there were recurrent disagreements with key senior and statutory officers including Land Registrar and other senior Land Registry officials, the Surveyor-General and the Valuer-General, as well as serious governance issues were raised repeatedly. Throughout these, both Minister Garbutt and Secretary Munro continued to give strong support to O’Keeffe, despite the frequent concerns raised by the State opposition and the media. More importantly, even investigations by the Auditor-General and the Ombudsman were largely ignored or dismissed. Further, opinions of the Victorian Government Solicitor were ignored. Notable concerns raised about O’Keeffe's leadership of Land Victoria included: 1. Estate Agency Guarantee Fund scandal; 2. Threats and intimidation of the Surveyor-General; 3. Reassign statutory responsibilities of Surveyor-General to other units of Land Victoria, breaching legislation - including the contracting for Vicmap property database, Measurement Calibration, Survey Control Network, GPS Base Station network (CORS); 4. Weakening the Office of the Valuer-General and downgrading the statutory position - during the term of Jack Dunham who served as Valuer-General for the period 1995–2007.; 5. Blocking independent expert investigations concerning the Lindsay Fox Portsea land-grabbing complaints; 6. Interference with the Victorian electoral boundary re-distribution process; 7. Threats of legal action to intimidate staff of Land Victoria.

Given that Victoria has a Westminster-style government, ministers are accountable, that is, they bear ultimate responsibility for all actions under their ministry during their tenure as minister– individual ministerial responsibility. As such, the actions under DNRE and its division Land Victoria, were the responsibility of Garbutt.

=== Parliament's Public Accounts and Estimates Committee inquiry ===
As Minister for Environment and Conservation, Garbutt was subject to scrutiny by the Parliament's Public Accounts and Estimates Committee (PAEC) inquiry into the 2002–03 budget estimates of 25 June 2002 concerning her failure to table the 1999–2000 and 2000–01 Reports of the Surveyor-General of Victoria, Keith Clifford Bell, as required under the Survey Coordination Act (1958). Although she advised the PAEC that the reports were not tabled as she considered them inaccurate, she was unable to provide any details of inaccuracies. Garbutt was also interviewed on ABC Radio by Virginia Trioli on 1 July 2002 and again claimed that the Surveyor-General's reports were inaccurate, but was unable to provide any details of her claims. The reports were subsequently tabled without alteration, and Garbutt made no further claims of inaccuracies. Garbutt had received her advice on unsubstantiated inaccuracies in the Surveyor-General's reports from O'Keeffe and sanctioned by Munro. From the outset, both the Victorian Government Solicitor and the Auditor-General, had advised that such reports should be tabled without interference. Matters raised by the Surveyor-General were also reported in the Auditor-General's own investigations and confirmed.

=== Auditor-General's investigation ===
Concerns raised in the Surveyor-General's reports were confirmed by the Auditor-General, who in 2002 reviewed the functions and responsibilities of the Surveyor-General. The Surveyor-General reported to Garbutt and was under Land Victoria for administration, a responsibility of Garbutt. The Auditor-General identified the interference by Land Victoria in the performance of the Surveyor-General's responsibilities, including the wrongful transfer of the Surveyor-General's responsibilities to other units of Land Victoria outside of the Office of Surveyor-General, viz. the Land Information Group under its then Director, Stephen Jacoby . The Auditor-General advised that the Surveyor-General's responsibilities could not be transferred without legislative mandate, consistent with the opinion of the Victorian Government Solicitor. The Auditor-General found that the transfer of the functions of the Surveyor-General had seen them delivered unsatisfactorily by the Land Information Group, and failing to meet the legislative obligations. The Opposition directed all blame for concerns to Minister Garbutt, and emphasized the extreme political interference in the performance of the statutory functions of the Surveyor-General by Garbutt, DNRE Secretary Munro and Land Victoria senior management under Executive Director O'Keeffe. Such interference included: attempts to block or alter annual reports from the Surveyor-General; threats and intimidation especially by O'Keeffe; hiring of private investigators to investigate the Surveyor-General and his office; and efforts to interfere with his review of State electoral boundaries in his capacity as an Electoral Boundaries Commissioner.

=== Estate Agents Guarantee Fund ===
Further concerns about Garbutt were raised in the Parliament on 17 April 2002 and again on 17 October 2002 by Opposition environment spokesman Victor Perton regarding the attempted misuse of millions of dollars from the Estate Agents Guarantee Fund (EAGF) by Land Victoria and the Department of Justice (DoJ). Specifically, Perton reported that Land Victoria and the Department of Justice had "conspired to invent a 'survey reform' project to win $7.5 million from the fund". Land Victoria, a division of DNRE, under direction of O’Keeffe, and in collaboration with DoJ, was reported to have attempted to create “the survey project” to obtain extra government funding through EAGF, despite already having been funded. The administration of EAGF was under DoJ. It was later reported that the Surveyor-General had reported his concerns to the Auditor-General who stepped in to prevent it proceeding. The Surveyor-General also reported his concerns to the Ombudsman. Perton, in April 2002 in Parliament and earlier in the media, quoted "from documents from 2001 in which the assistant director of land records and information services, Ivan Powell, talks of having 'invented some benefits' in regards to the project and of a request to 'invent another layer of detail'". Powell was a senior Land Registry official (under Land Victoria).

=== The ASIBA Lobbying Contract ===
Over the period 2001–04, The Age, Herald Sun and ABC carried numerous reports of such interference and it was frequently raised by the Opposition in both Houses of the Parliament of Victoria and was reported in Hansard. It was also reported that O’Keeffe had approved an illegal $100,000 contract for a consultant to "lobby her own Minister" Garbutt to discredit the Surveyor-General. The contract was signed with the Australian Spatial Information Business Association (ASIBA), later known as the Spatial Information Business Association (SIBA) and now the Geospatial Council of Australia (GCA). GCA also includes the former Surveying and Spatial Sciences Institute (SSSI). The contract was agreed between O'Keeffe and ASIBA, and presumedly with the concurrence of Garbutt and Munro. Following recurrent adverse media and Opposition reporting of the contract being illegal, the contract was found to be inappropriate and was cancelled after the first tranche of $25,000 was paid to ASIBA.

=== Departure of O'Keeffe ===
On 12 July 2002, the prominent Melbourne newspaper, The Age, reported that O’Keeffe had resigned and further reported that the Opposition claimed O’Keeffe had been sacked. Minister Garbutt denied that O'Keeffe had been sacked. The same day, O’Keeffe issued an internal memo, copied to all DNRE staff, dismissing the Opposition claims and advising she had instructed her lawyers to seek an unconditional retraction and apology from the Opposition and media. Also, she advised she would take legal action on any further claims. The media reporting of O'Keeffe's departure as a sacking continued, but there was no reported legal action taken by O'Keeffe. However, there were also further senior departures from Land Victoria throughout 2002.

=== Melbourne’s Royal Botanical Gardens – the Great Bat Bungle ===
In 2001, Garbutt, as Minister of Environment authorized the killing of flying-foxes in the Royal Botanical Gardens by the company, Wildpro. In authorizing this, Garbutt rejected her scientific ministerial committee's advice that the species was endangered, agreeing instead with the Gardens' management. Wildpro began the killings in April–May 2001. Considerable media attention and public protests ensued. The killings continued even after Garbutt was replaced by new minister John Thwaites in 2003. Subsequently, the species was declared endangered in New South Wales, and the federal Environment Minister Robert Hill intervened to prevent further killings. The Age reported Garbutt's poor decision making as “the Great Bat Bungle” where she ignored expert scientific advice. During Thwaites' tenure the flying-foxes were relocated.

== Concerns Raised During Tenure as Minister for Community Services 2002-2006 ==
When in the role of Community Services Minister, Garbutt was heavily criticised by the Opposition for the Government's handling of new child-protection legislation in 2004. The Bill was introduced following the deaths of three children the previous year. However, criticism also came from both Victorian Law organization and children's groups. The criticism was on top of criticism of Garbutt and the government following the earlier leaking of the Child Protection Outcomes Report in May 2003.

Controversies continued during Garbutt's term as Minister for Community Services. In November 2006, Garbutt was reported to have sacked two female staff members, one who was pregnant and the other the wife of a Liberal. Both were reported as unfair dismissals.

Parliament of Victoria
Preceded by Pauline Toner	Member for Greensborough; 1989–1992	Succeeded by Abolished
Preceded by John Cain	Member for Bundoora; 1992–2006	Succeeded by Colin Brooks
