= Surveying and Spatial Sciences Institute =

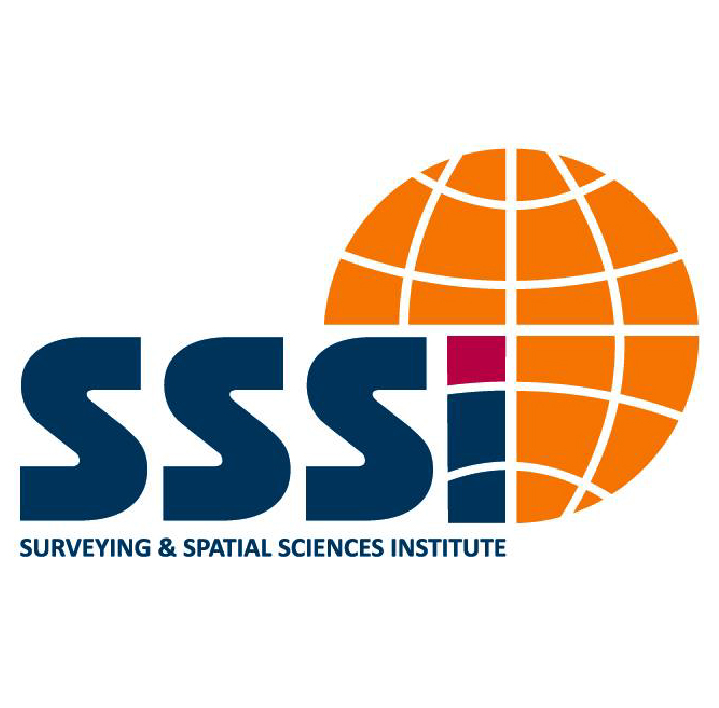
- Abbreviation: SSSI
- Merger of: Spatial Sciences Institute (SSI); Institute of Surveyors Australia (ISA); Australian Urban and Regional Information Systems Association (AURISA); Remote Sensing and Photogrammetry Association of Australia (RSPAA)
- Website: www.sssi.org.au

The Surveying and Spatial Sciences Institute (SSSI) is the professional association for surveyors and spatial science workers, including cartography, hydrography, remote sensing, engineering and mining surveying, photogrammetry and spatial information in Australia. The institute's members are involved in communities of practice such as land administration, land development, natural resource management, forestry, agriculture, defence, marine environment, local government, health, education, transport, tourism, and many more. The institute deals with policy, administration, collection, measurement, analysis, interpretation, portrayal and dissemination of spatially- related land and sea information, together with associated planning, design and management.

SSSI is located in eight different regions across Australia, providing services in the six states and two territories. The institute's headquarters are located at National Surveyors House in Canberra, Australia.

== Background ==
The spatial sciences range from the traditional practices of surveying and cartography to the more recent practices using GPS, remote sensing and GIS. The spatial sciences involve the skills and understanding to capture, store, manage, manipulate, analyse, model, visualise, set-out and govern information that can be referenced to location.

Information that can be related to a location is termed spatial information. Though predominantly perceived as geo (earth) related, spatial information can range from the anatomic to astronomic scale, from the real to the abstract entity, over any time period.

SSSI acquire, integrate, manage, analyse, interpret, map or distribute information about a location in space and time. They develop, design, and provide related equipment, software and value-added services; undertake applied research, knowledge management and technology development; and manage, educate and train others.

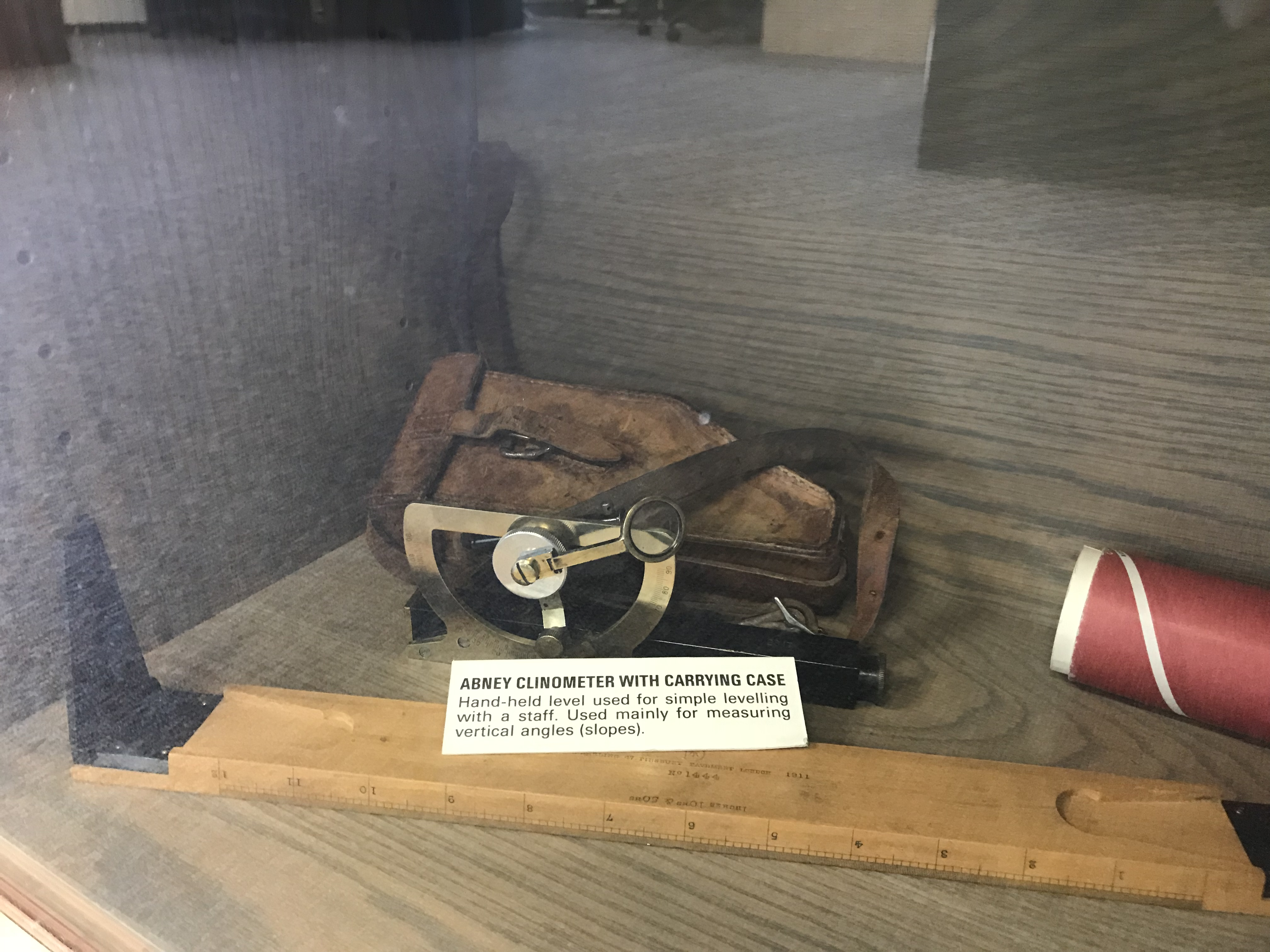
Abney Clinometer with carrying case

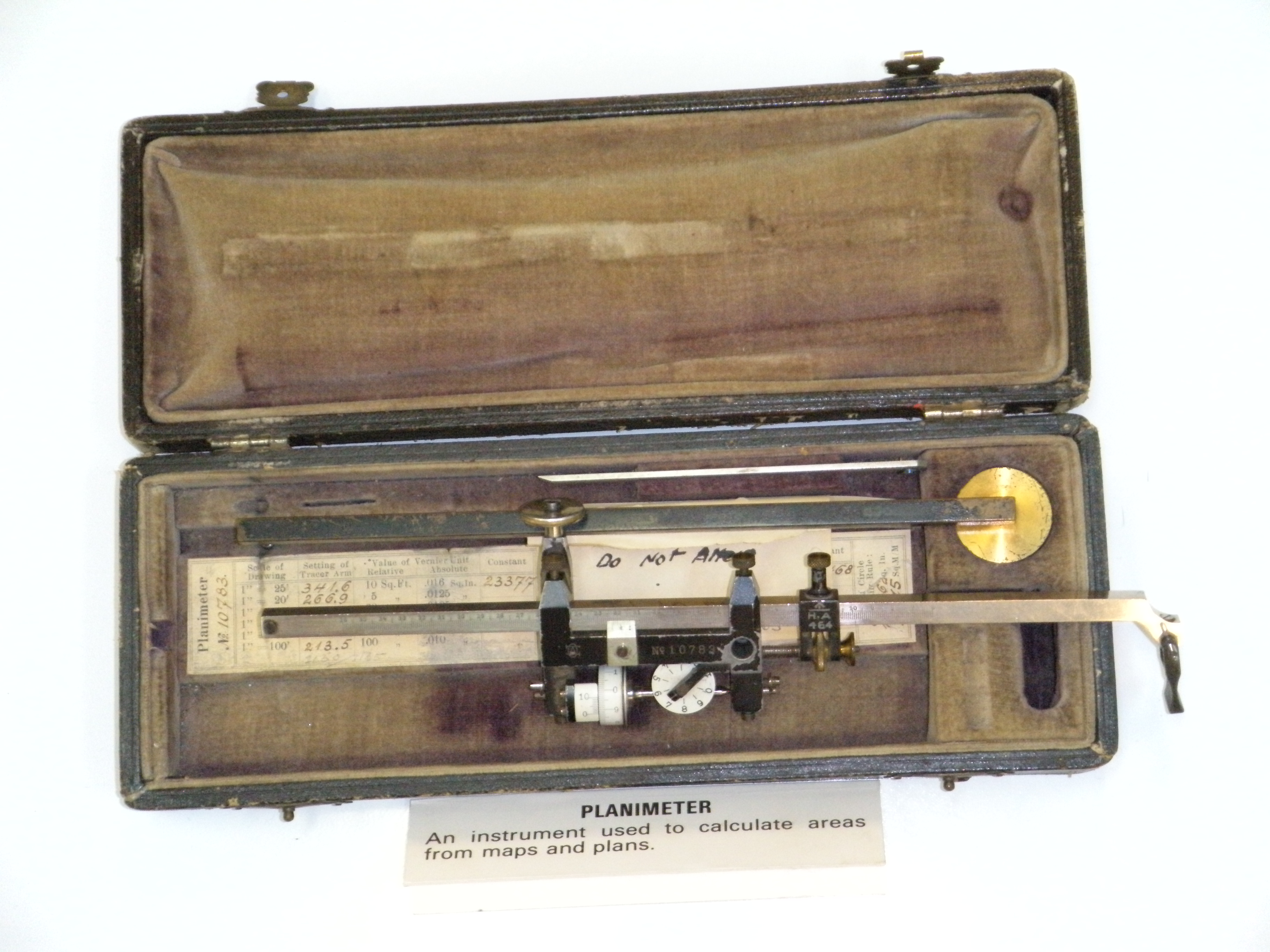
Planimeter

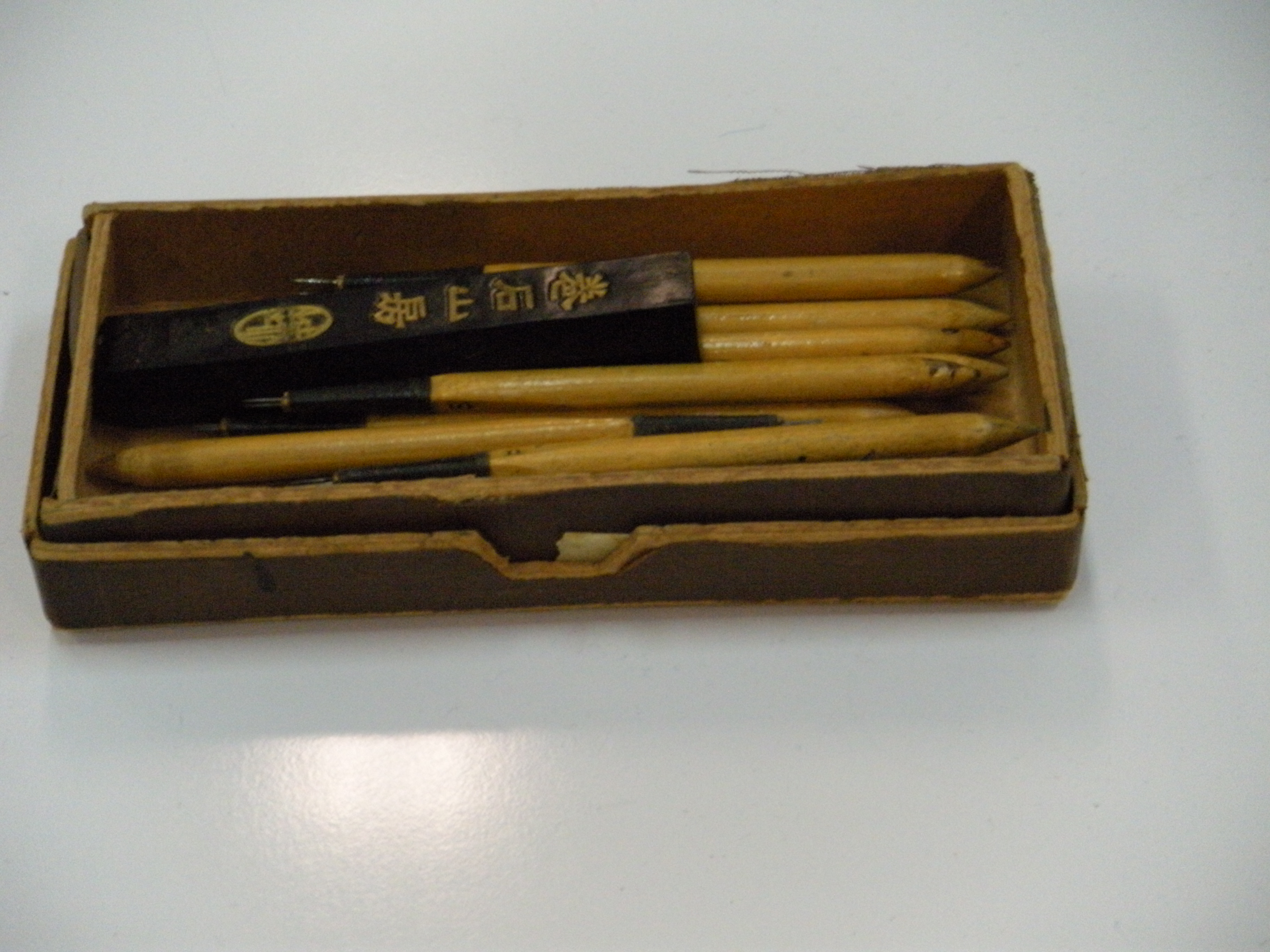
Lithograph Needles and Sharpening Stone

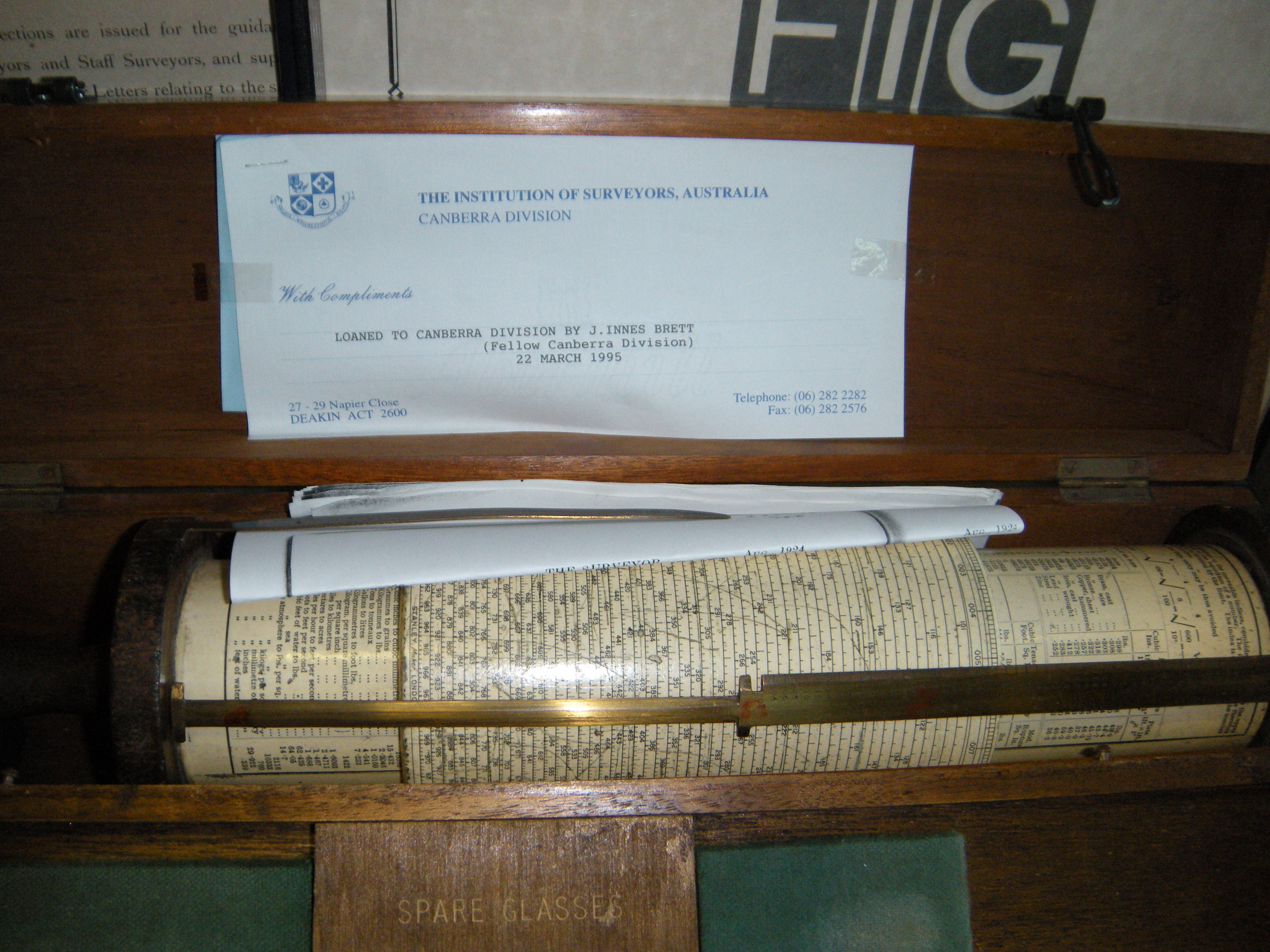
Spare Glasses

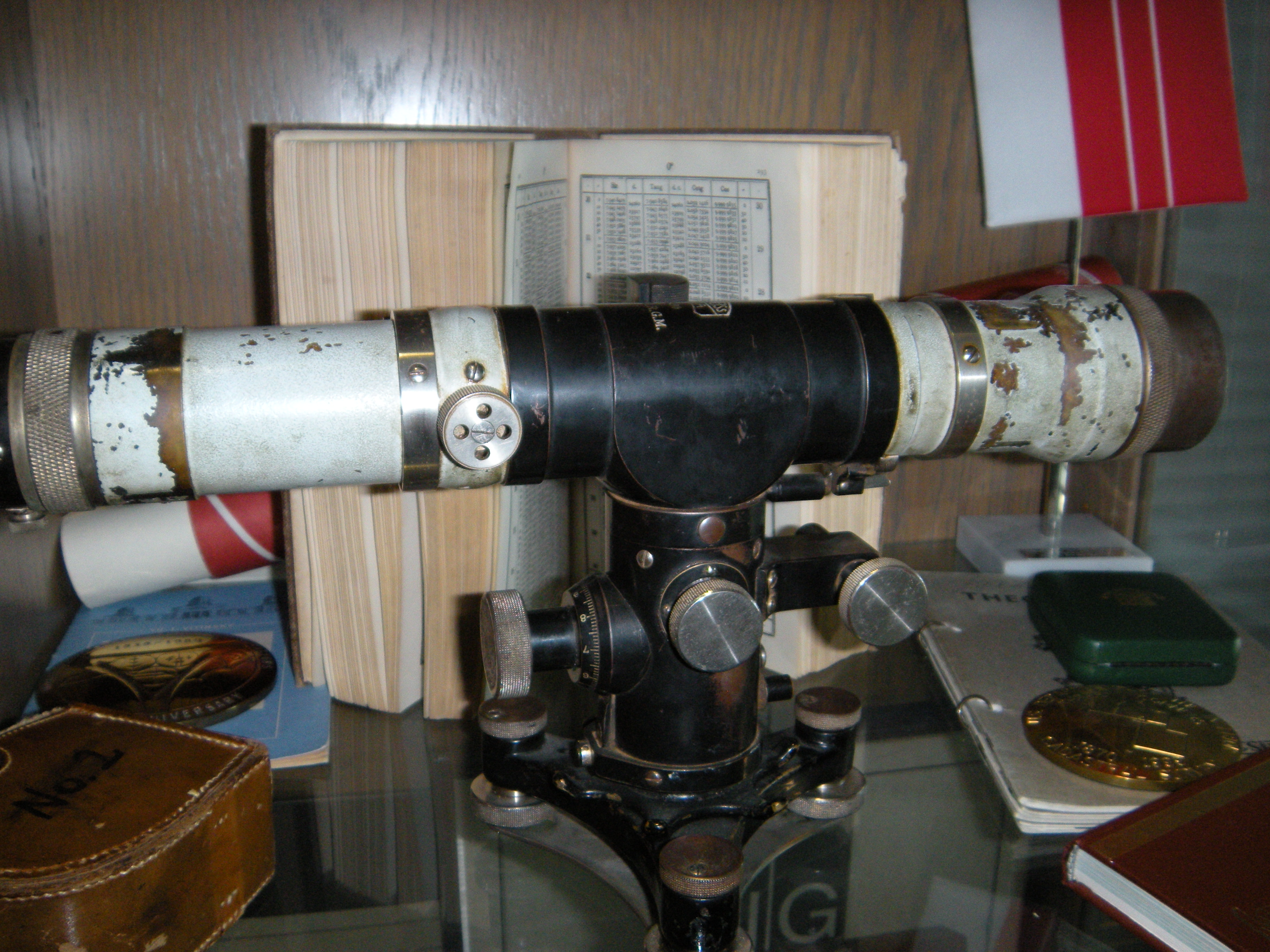
Surveying Antique Old Level

== Objectives ==
The institute's purpose & objectives are to support members in application and practice of surveying and spatial science. This is supported by promoting and representing professional interests of members that work in the discipline of surveying & spatial science. Additionally, the institute also facilitates the exchange of ideas and knowledge between members of the institute via lectures and conferences.

In short, the institute provides with the following benefits to its members:

1. Advocacy
2. Events
3. Professional Development
4. Certification
5. Migration Skill Assessment

== History ==
The Spatial Sciences Institute (SSI) represents the interests of the spatial information community within the Asia-Pacific region. The Spatial Sciences Institute (SSI) is a not-for-profit professional body with headquarters in Canberra, Australia. Its membership spans the disciplines of surveying, information technology, town planning, cartography, archeology, spatial information (GPS, remote sensing and GIS) professions and others.

In 1952, six State Institutes combined to form Institute of Surveyors Australia (ISA), the result of more than seventy years of intermittent effort.

Institute of Surveyors Australia (ISA), Australian Urban and Regional Information Systems Association (AURISA) and Remote Sensing and Photogrammetry Association of Australia (RSPAA) amalgamated to form SSI in 2003.

The SSI merged with the Institute of Surveyors Australia (ISA) to form the Surveying and Spatial Sciences Institute (SSSI) in July 2009.

In 2009, SSSI participated in Q150 (the 150th anniversary of the founding of Queensland) by placing permanent memorials to early explorer/surveyors of Queensland at significant locations. They include a memorial to surveyor to Francis Peter MacCabe at the Calliope River Historical Village (23°57′34.71″S 151°09′06.26″E)

The current name, "Surveying and Spatial Sciences Institute", has been chosen by a democratic process which gave all members of both SSI and ISA a vote in choosing the name. Initially, a call for suggested names was distributed with over 200 names proposed. A two-stage vote was held with a short list of four names offered after the first round of voting and a substantial majority selecting the final name. Over 1200 members participated in both stages of the vote evenly spread across both SSI and ISA memberships.

== Leadership ==
=== Past presidents ===
Year	President
2009	Jonathon Saxon
2009-10	Michael Giudici
2010	Jonathon Saxon
2010-11	Gypsy Bhalla
2011-13	Gary Maguire
2013-15	John Trinder
2015-16	Bernard O'Sullivan
2016-18	Gabriel Van Wyk

=== Board members ===
The board of management of the Institute are responsible for the governance, strategic planning, fiduciary oversight and monitoring against the strategic plan.

The members of the Board of Directors are

- President
- President-elect
- Six regional directors
- Director of the Hydrography commission
- Chair of the Young Professionals Special Interest Group

The Consultative Council handles membership, professional development, certification and service delivery.

== Commissions ==
Membership of the institution are divided into Commissions, with the first ones being

1. Land Surveying;
2. Hydrography;
3. Engineering and Mining Surveying;
4. Spatial Information and Cartography and
5. Remote Sensing and Photogrammetry

The role of a Commission Committee is to formulate and discuss policy for the commission and to advice the Directors on matters relating to the commission.

== Membership ==
Membership categories are necessary in a professional institute to differentiate between differing levels of qualification and experience. Movement through the membership occurs via an articulation process which involves satisfying the prescribed progression and professional certification criteria.

Membership Categories

1. Honorary Fellows
2. Fellows
3. Member
4. Associate member
5. Affiliate
6. First year graduate
7. Second year graduate
8. Part time student
9. Overseas Membership
10. Student

== Special Interest Groups ==
Special Interest Groups are based on specific grouping of members of the institute. A representative from these groups are invited by Directors to participate at any meeting, Committee, Council or Board of the institute.

=== Young Professionals ===
The Young Professionals are members of the institute who are under 36 years old. Their role within the institute is to foster member and growth of the institute through service delivery to young surveying and spatial professionals; representation of young surveying and spatial professional in the institute; provision of leadership to young professionals within the profession; and the engendering of the community awareness of the surveying and spatial sciences and the institute.

There is a Young Professionals regional committee within each state, and these committees work with the broader regional committees of each region as well as the commissions to deliver events, opportunities and networking for members.

=== Women in Spatial ===
This special interest group, is based on a grouping of members on a specific topic or subject. Most regions hold special events for women in surveying & spatial sciences to encourage women to engage and develop skills.

== Other efforts ==
=== Certification ===
SSSI offers a certification program to enable members and non-members to gain recognition of their competencies through a formal “portfolio-based” process. Certifications are available for general competencies and specialist competencies including spatial information, hydrographic surveying, remote sensing, and engineering surveying.

=== Migration Skill Assessment ===
The Institute carries out an authorised assessment of skills and qualifications for migration to Australia. Only Surveyor ANZSCO 232212 general skilled occupation can be assessed by SSSI.

== Events and awards ==
The institute conducts various events & awards for its members to facilitate knowledge sharing and networking.

1. LOCATE : A geo-spatial conference which is conducted annually
2. APSEA: The Asia Pacific Spatial Excellence Awards are conducted to celebrate achievement of top spatial and surveying professionals
3. SEASC: South East Asia Survey Congress is a surveying event that will be conducted for the first time at Darwin, Australia in 2019
4. E-CPD : A webinar which is accessible by SSSI members.

== Publications ==
The official publication of SSSI is POSITION which is published once in two months. It is an Australian magazine of surveying, mapping and geo-information while Geo-message is a monthly newsletter.

The Journal of Spatial Science is an academic journal owned jointly by SSSI and Mapping Sciences Institute, Australia. This journal publishes original peer-reviewed research and review papers that contribute to the theory and practice of the survey and spatial sciences. The Journal also publishes professional papers that describe aspects of professional practise and implementation of techniques related to cartography, geodesy, geographic information science, hydrography, photogrammetry, remote sensing or surveying.

== Partners ==
=== National ===
- The Institution of Surveyors NSW - represents land surveying, and engineering and mining surveying professionals in New South Wales
- Surveyors Board of South Australia represents land surveying, and engineering and mining surveying professionals in South Australia
- The Mapping Sciences Institute Australia is a learned society established to engender the professional development of individuals and organisations involved in the many facets of the mapping sciences

=== International ===
- The Urban and Regional Information Systems Association (URISA) is a multidisciplinary association. The Association for GIS Professionals, URISA is a leading provider of learning and knowledge for the GIS community
- The Chartered Institution of Civil Engineering Surveyors (ICES) is an international qualifying body dedicated to the regulation, education and training of surveyors working within civil engineering
- The International Federation of Surveyors (FIG) is an international, non-government organisation whose purpose is to support international collaboration for the progress of surveying in all fields and applications
- The Australasian Hydrographic Society is the South West Pacific and South East Asian regional focus for those interested in hydrography and related sciences

== See also ==
- ANZLIC
- Surveying in Australia
