= Minister for Trade and Tourism =

Australian cabinet position

- Commonwealth Coat of Arms

- Flag of Australia

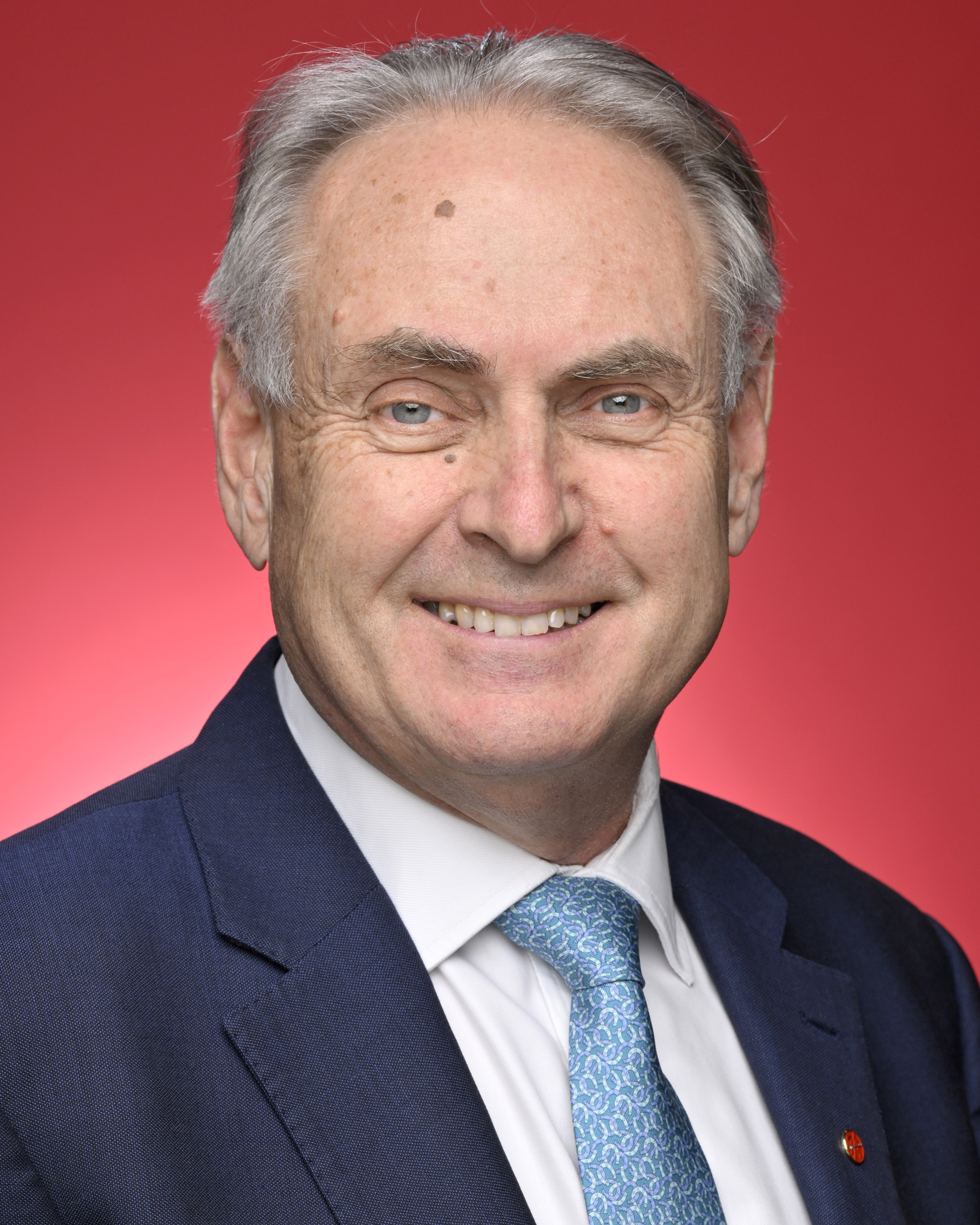
- Incumbent; Don Farrell since 1 June 2022
- Department of Foreign Affairs and Trade
- Style: The Honourable
- Appointer: Governor-General on the advice of the prime minister
- Inaugural holder: Charles Kingston (as Minister for Trade and Customs)
- Formation: 1 January 1901
- Website: www.trademinister.gov.au

The Minister for Trade and Tourism is a portfolio in the Government of Australia, falling within the Department of Foreign Affairs and Trade (DFAT). The position is currently held by Senator Don Farrell, sworn in as part of the Albanese ministry on 1 June 2022, following the Australian federal election in 2022. The minister is assisted by the Assistant Minister for Foreign Affairs and Trade, held by Matt Thistlethwaite, and the Assistant Minister for Tourism, held by Nita Green.

== Portfolio ==
In the Government of Australia, the minister and assistant minister(s) administer the portfolio through the Department of Foreign Affairs and Trade (DFAT) jointly with the Minister for Foreign Affairs. Other trade-related bodies for which the minister and assistant minister are responsible are:

- Austrade
- Export Finance Australia
- Tourism Australia

DFAT was created in 1987 through the merger of the Department of Foreign Affairs and the Department of Trade. In sequence, the trade portfolio has been administered by the following departments:

- Department of Trade and Customs (1901–1956)
- Department of Trade (1956–1963)
- Department of Trade and Industry (1963–1972)
- Department of Overseas Trade (1972–1977)
- Department of Trade and Resources (1977–1983)
- Department of Trade (1983–1987)
- Department of Foreign Affairs and Trade (1987–present)

== List of ministers for trade ==
The following individuals have been appointed as minister for trade, tourism and investment, or any of its precedent titles:

Order	Minister	Party	Prime Minister	Title	Term start	Term end	Term in office
1	Charles Kingston	Protectionist	Barton	Minister for Trade and Customs	1 January 1901	24 July 1903	2 years, 204 days
2	William Lyne	Protectionist	Barton	Minister for Trade and Customs	11 August 1903	24 September 1903	260 days
2	William Lyne	Protectionist	Deakin	Minister for Trade and Customs	24 September 1903	27 April 1904	260 days
3	Andrew Fisher	Labor	Watson	Minister for Trade and Customs	27 April 1904	17 August 1904	112 days
4	Allan McLean	Protectionist	Reid	Minister for Trade and Customs	17 August 1904	5 July 1905	322 days
n/a	William Lyne	Protectionist	Deakin	Minister for Trade and Customs	5 July 1905	30 July 1907	2 years, 25 days
5	Austin Chapman	Protectionist	Deakin	Minister for Trade and Customs	30 July 1907	13 November 1908	1 year, 106 days
6	Frank Tudor	Labor	Fisher	Minister for Trade and Customs	13 November 1908	2 June 1909	201 days
7	Robert Best	Liberal	Deakin	Minister for Trade and Customs	2 June 1909	29 April 1910	331 days
n/a	Frank Tudor	Labor	Fisher	Minister for Trade and Customs	29 April 1910	24 June 1913	3 years, 56 days
8	Littleton Groom	Liberal	Cook	Minister for Trade and Customs	24 June 1913	17 September 1914	1 year, 85 days
n/a	Frank Tudor	Labor	Fisher	Minister for Trade and Customs	17 September 1914	27 October 1915	1 year, 363 days
n/a	Frank Tudor	Labor	Hughes	Minister for Trade and Customs	27 October 1915	14 September 1916	1 year, 363 days
9	Billy Hughes	Labor	Hughes	Minister for Trade and Customs	29 September 1916	14 November 1916	46 days
10	William Archibald	National Labor	Hughes	Minister for Trade and Customs	14 November 1916	17 February 1917	95 days
11	Jens Jensen	Nationalist	Hughes	Minister for Trade and Customs	17 February 1917	13 December 1918	1 year, 299 days
12	William Watt	Nationalist	Hughes	Minister for Trade and Customs	13 December 1918	17 January 1919	35 days
13	Walter Massy-Greene	Nationalist	Hughes	Minister for Trade and Customs	17 January 1919	21 December 1921	2 years, 338 days
14	Arthur Rodgers	Nationalist	Hughes	Minister for Trade and Customs	21 December 1921	5 February 1923	1 year, 46 days
n/a	Austin Chapman	Nationalist	Bruce	Minister for Trade and Customs	9 February 1923	26 May 1924	1 year, 107 days
n/a	Littleton Groom	Nationalist	Bruce	Minister for Trade and Customs	26 May 1924	13 June 1924	18 days
15	Herbert Pratten	Nationalist	Bruce	Minister for Trade and Customs	13 June 1924	7 May 1928	3 years, 329 days
16	Stanley Bruce	Nationalist	Bruce	Minister for Trade and Customs	8 May 1928	28 November 1928	204 days
17	Henry Gullett	Nationalist	Bruce	Minister for Trade and Customs	28 November 1928	22 October 1929	328 days
18	James Fenton	Labor	Scullin	Minister for Trade and Customs	22 October 1929	4 February 1931	1 year, 105 days
19	Frank Forde	Labor	Scullin	Minister for Trade and Customs	4 February 1931	6 January 1932	336 days
n/a	Henry Gullett	United Australia	Lyons	Minister for Trade and Customs	6 January 1932	14 January 1933	1 year, 8 days
20	Thomas White	United Australia	Lyons	Minister for Trade and Customs	14 January 1933	8 November 1938	5 years, 298 days
21	John Perkins	United Australia	Lyons	Minister for Trade and Customs	8 November 1938	7 April 1939	169 days
21	John Perkins	United Australia	Page	Minister for Trade and Customs	7 April 1939	26 April 1939	169 days
22	John Lawson	United Australia	Menzies	Minister for Trade and Customs	26 April 1939	23 February 1940	303 days
23	Robert Menzies	United Australia	Menzies	Minister for Trade and Customs	23 February 1940	14 March 1940	20 days
24	George McLeay	United Australia	Menzies	Minister for Trade and Customs	14 March 1940	28 October 1940	228 days
25	Eric Harrison	United Australia	Menzies	Minister for Trade and Customs	28 October 1940	29 August 1941	344 days
25	Eric Harrison	United Australia	Fadden	Minister for Trade and Customs	29 August 1941	7 October 1941	344 days
26	Richard Keane	Labor	Curtin	Minister for Trade and Customs	7 October 1941	6 July 1945	4 years, 201 days
26	Richard Keane	Labor	Forde	Minister for Trade and Customs	6 July 1945	13 July 1945	4 years, 201 days
26	Richard Keane	Labor	Chifley	Minister for Trade and Customs	13 July 1945	26 April 1946	4 years, 201 days
27	John Dedman	Labor	Chifley	Minister for Trade and Customs	26 April 1946	18 June 1946	53 days
28	James Fraser	Labor	Chifley	Minister for Trade and Customs	18 June 1946	1 November 1946	136 days
29	Ben Courtice	Labor	Chifley	Minister for Trade and Customs	1 November 1946	19 December 1949	3 years, 48 days
30	Neil O'Sullivan	Liberal	Menzies	Minister for Trade and Customs	19 December 1949	11 January 1956	6 years, 23 days
31	John McEwen	Country	Menzies	Minister for Trade	11 January 1956	18 December 1963	15 years, 25 days
31	John McEwen	Country	Menzies	Minister for Trade and Industry	18 December 1963	26 January 1966	15 years, 25 days
31	John McEwen	Country	Holt	Minister for Trade and Industry	26 January 1966	19 December 1967	15 years, 25 days
31	John McEwen	Country	McEwen	Minister for Trade and Industry	19 December 1967	10 January 1968	15 years, 25 days
31	John McEwen	Country	Gorton	Minister for Trade and Industry	10 January 1968	5 February 1971	15 years, 25 days
32	Doug Anthony	Country	Gorton	Minister for Trade and Industry	5 February 1971	10 March 1971	1 year, 270 days
32	Doug Anthony	Country	McMahon	Minister for Trade and Industry	10 March 1971	5 December 1972	1 year, 270 days
33	Gough Whitlam^{1}	Labor	Whitlam	Minister for Trade and Industry	5 December 1972	19 December 1972	14 days
34	Jim Cairns	Labor	Whitlam	Minister for Overseas Trade	19 December 1972	11 December 1974	1 year, 357 days
35	Frank Crean	Labor	Whitlam	Minister for Overseas Trade	11 December 1974	11 November 1975	335 days
n/a	Doug Anthony	National Country	Fraser	Minister for Overseas Trade	11 November 1975	20 December 1977	7 years, 120 days
n/a	Doug Anthony	National Country	Fraser	Minister for Trade and Resources	20 December 1977	16 October 1982	7 years, 120 days
n/a	Doug Anthony	National	Fraser	Minister for Trade and Resources	16 October 1982	11 March 1983	7 years, 120 days
36	Lionel Bowen	Labor	Hawke	Minister for Trade	11 March 1983	13 December 1984	1 year, 277 days
37	John Dawkins	Labor	Hawke	Minister for Trade	13 December 1984	24 July 1987	2 years, 223 days
38	Michael Duffy	Labor	Hawke	Minister for Trade Negotiations	24 July 1987	4 April 1990	2 years, 254 days
39	Neal Blewett	Labor	Hawke	Minister for Trade Negotiations	4 April 1990	1 February 1991	1 year, 267 days
39	Neal Blewett	Labor	Hawke	Minister for Trade and Overseas Development	1 February 1991	20 December 1991	1 year, 267 days
39	Neal Blewett	Labor	Keating	Minister for Trade and Overseas Development	20 December 1991	27 December 1991	1 year, 267 days
40	John Kerin	Labor	Keating	Minister for Trade and Overseas Development	27 December 1991	24 March 1993	1 year, 87 days
41	Peter Cook	Labor	Keating	Minister for Trade	24 March 1993	30 January 1994	312 days
42	Bob McMullan	Labor	Keating	Minister for Trade	30 January 1994	11 March 1996	2 years, 41 days
43	Tim Fischer	National	Howard	Minister for Trade	11 March 1996	20 July 1999	3 years, 131 days
44	Mark Vaile	National	Howard	Minister for Trade	20 July 1999	29 September 2006	7 years, 71 days
45	Warren Truss	National	Howard	Minister for Trade	29 September 2006	3 December 2007	1 year, 65 days
46	Simon Crean	Labor	Rudd	Minister for Trade	3 December 2007	24 June 2010	2 years, 207 days
46	Simon Crean	Labor	Gillard	Minister for Trade	24 June 2010	28 June 2010	2 years, 207 days
47	Stephen Smith	Labor	Gillard	Minister for Trade	28 June 2010	14 September 2010	78 days
48	Craig Emerson	Labor	Gillard	Minister for Trade	14 September 2010	5 March 2012	2 years, 286 days
48	Craig Emerson	Labor	Gillard	Minister for Trade and Competitiveness	5 March 2012	27 June 2013	2 years, 286 days
49	Richard Marles	Labor	Rudd	Minister for Trade	27 June 2013	18 September 2013	83 days
50	Andrew Robb	Liberal	Abbott	Minister for Trade and Investment	18 September 2013	15 September 2015	2 years, 153 days
50	Andrew Robb	Liberal	Turnbull	Minister for Trade and Investment	15 September 2015	18 February 2016	2 years, 153 days
51	Steven Ciobo	Liberal	Turnbull	Minister for Trade and Investment	18 February 2016	19 July 2016	2 years, 191 days
51	Steven Ciobo	Liberal	Turnbull	Minister for Trade, Tourism and Investment	19 July 2016	28 August 2018	2 years, 191 days
52	Simon Birmingham	Liberal	Morrison	Minister for Trade, Tourism and Investment	28 August 2018	22 December 2020	2 years, 116 days
53	Dan Tehan	Liberal	Morrison	Minister for Trade, Tourism and Investment	22 December 2020	23 May 2022	1 year, 152 days
54	Don Farrell	Labor	Albanese	Minister for Trade and Tourism	1 June 2022	Incumbent	4 years, 99 days

Notes

^{1} Whitlam was part of a two-man ministry that comprised just Gough Whitlam and Lance Barnard for fourteen days, until the full ministry was announced.

== List of ministers for tourism ==
Since 1966, Australia had ministers responsible for tourism under various titles. The following individuals have been appointed as Minister for Tourism, or any of its precedent titles:

Order	Minister	Party	Prime Minister	Ministerial title	Term start	Term end	Term in office
1	Don Chipp	Liberal	Holt	Minister in charge of Tourist Activities	14 December 1966	19 December 1967	1 year, 76 days
1	Don Chipp	Liberal	McEwen	Minister in charge of Tourist Activities	19 December 1967	10 January 1968	1 year, 76 days
1	Don Chipp	Liberal	Gorton	Minister in charge of Tourist Activities	10 January 1968	28 February 1968	1 year, 76 days
2	Reg Wright	Liberal	Gorton	Minister in charge of Tourist Activities	28 February 1968	10 March 1971	3 years, 92 days
2	Reg Wright	Liberal	McMahon	Minister in charge of Tourist Activities	10 March 1971	31 May 1971	3 years, 92 days
3	Peter Howson	Liberal	McMahon	Minister in charge of Tourist Activities	31 May 1971	5 December 1972	1 year, 188 days
4	Frank Stewart	Labor	Whitlam	Minister for Tourism and Recreation	19 December 1972	11 November 1975	2 years, 327 days
5	Reg Withers	Liberal	Fraser	Minister for Tourism and Recreation	11 November 1975	22 December 1975	41 days
6	John Brown	Labor	Hawke	Minister for Sport, Recreation and Tourism	11 March 1983	24 July 1987	4 years, 282 days
6	John Brown	Labor	Hawke	Minister for Arts, Sport, the Environment, Tourism and Territories	24 July 1987	18 December 1987	4 years, 282 days
7	Graham Richardson	Labor	Hawke	Minister for Arts, Sport, the Environment, Tourism and Territories	19 January 1988	4 April 1990	2 years, 75 days
8	Ros Kelly	Labor	Hawke	Minister for Arts, Sport, the Environment, Tourism and Territories	4 April 1990	20 December 1991	1 year, 267 days
8	Ros Kelly	Labor	Keating	Minister for Arts, Sport, the Environment, Tourism and Territories	20 December 1991	27 December 1991	1 year, 267 days
9	Alan Griffiths	Labor	Keating	Minister for Tourism	27 December 1991	24 March 1993	1 year, 87 days
10	Michael Lee	Labor	Keating	Minister for Tourism	24 March 1993	11 March 1996	2 years, 353 days
11	John Moore	Liberal	Howard	Minister for Industry, Science and Tourism	11 March 1996	21 October 1998	2 years, 224 days
12	Jackie Kelly	Liberal	Howard	Minister for Sport and Tourism	21 October 1998	26 November 2001	3 years, 36 days
13	Ian Macfarlane	Liberal	Howard	Minister for Industry, Tourism and Resources	26 November 2001	3 December 2007	6 years, 7 days
14	Martin Ferguson	Labor	Rudd	Minister for Tourism	3 December 2007	24 June 2010	5 years, 112 days
14	Martin Ferguson	Labor	Gillard	Minister for Tourism	24 June 2010	25 March 2013	5 years, 112 days
15	Gary Gray	Labor	Gillard	Minister for Tourism	25 March 2013	27 June 2013	177 days
15	Gary Gray	Labor	Rudd	Minister for Tourism	27 June 2013	18 September 2013	177 days
16	Richard Colbeck	Liberal	Turnbull	Minister for Tourism and International Education	21 September 2015	19 July 2016	302 days
17	Steven Ciobo	Liberal	Turnbull	Minister for Trade, Tourism and Investment	19 July 2016	28 August 2018	2 years, 40 days
18	Simon Birmingham	Liberal	Morrison	Minister for Trade, Tourism and Investment	28 August 2018	22 December 2020	2 years, 116 days
19	Dan Tehan	Liberal	Morrison	Minister for Trade, Tourism and Investment	22 December 2020	23 May 2022	1 year, 152 days
20	Don Farrell	Labor	Albanese	Minister for Trade and Tourism	1 June 2022	Incumbent	4 years, 99 days

== Former ministerial titles ==
=== List of ministers assisting the minister for trade and tourism ===
The following individuals have been appointed as minister assisting the minister for trade and investment, or its preceding titles:

Order	Minister	Party	Prime Minister	Title	Term start	Term end	Term in office
1	Ian Sinclair	Country	Holt	Minister assisting the Minister for Trade and Industry	14 December 1966	19 December 1967	4 years, 53 days
1	Ian Sinclair	Country	McEwen	Minister assisting the Minister for Trade and Industry	19 December 1967	10 January 1968	4 years, 53 days
1	Ian Sinclair	Country	Gorton	Minister assisting the Minister for Trade and Industry	10 January 1968	5 February 1971	4 years, 53 days
2	John Howard	Liberal	Fraser	Minister for Special Trade Negotiations	17 July 1977	20 December 1977	156 days
3	Victor Garland	Liberal	Fraser	Minister for Special Trade Representations	20 December 1977	8 December 1979	1 year, 353 days
4	Douglas Scott	National Country	Fraser	Minister for Special Trade Representations; Minister assisting the Minister for Trade and Resources	8 December 1979	19 August 1980	255 days
5	Ian Sinclair	National Country	Fraser	Minister for Special Trade Representations	19 August 1980	3 November 1980	76 days
6	Tom McVeigh	National Country	Fraser	Minister Assisting the Minister for Trade and Resources	3 November 1980	11 March 1983	2 years, 128 days
7	Andrew Thomson	Liberal	Howard	Minister for Sport and Tourism	9 October 1997	21 October 1998	1 year, 12 days
8	Jackie Kelly	Liberal	Howard	Minister for Sport and Tourism	21 October 1998	26 November 2001	3 years, 36 days
9	Joe Hockey	Liberal	Howard	Minister for Small Business and Tourism	26 November 2001	26 October 2004	2 years, 335 days
10	Fran Bailey	Liberal	Howard	Minister for Small Business and Tourism	26 October 2004	3 December 2007	3 years, 38 days
11	Richard Colbeck	Liberal	Turnbull	Minister Assisting the Minister for Trade and Investment	21 September 2015	19 July 2016	302 days
12	Andrew Gee	Morrison	National	Minister Assisting the Minister for Trade and Investment	6 February 2020	2 July 2021	1 year, 146 days
13	David Gillespie	Morrison	National	Minister Assisting the Minister for Trade and Investment	2 July 2021	23 May 2022	325 days

== Parliamentary secretaries and assistant ministers ==
=== List of parliamentary secretaries and assistant ministers for trade ===
The following individuals have been appointed as parliamentary secretary and assistant ministers for trade:

Order	Minister	Party	Prime Minister	Title	Term start	Term end	Term in office
1	Stephen Martin	Labor	Keating	Parliamentary Secretary to the Minister for Foreign Affairs and Trade	27 December 1991	24 March 1993	1 year, 87 days
2	David Brownhill	National	Howard	Parliamentary Secretary to the Minister for Trade	11 March 1996	21 October 1998	2 years, 224 days
3	Larry Anthony	National	Howard	Parliamentary Secretary to the Minister for Trade	21 October 1998	20 July 1999	272 days
4	De-Anne Kelly	National	Howard	Parliamentary Secretary to the Minister for Trade	7 October 2003	26 October 2004	1 year, 19 days
5	Bruce Billson	Liberal	Howard	Parliamentary Secretary for Foreign Affairs and Trade	26 October 2004	6 July 2005	253 days
6	Sandy Macdonald	National	Howard	Parliamentary Secretary to the Minister for Trade	6 July 2005	27 January 2006	205 days
(4)	De-Anne Kelly	National	Howard	Parliamentary Secretary to the Minister for Trade	27 January 2006	29 September 2006	245 days
7	John Murphy	Labor	Rudd	Parliamentary Secretary to the Minister for Trade	3 December 2007	25 February 2009	1 year, 84 days
8	Anthony Byrne	Labor	Rudd	Parliamentary Secretary for Trade	25 February 2009	24 June 2010	1 year, 201 days
8	Anthony Byrne	Labor	Gillard	Parliamentary Secretary for Trade	24 June 2010	14 September 2010	1 year, 201 days
9	Justine Elliot	Labor	Gillard	Parliamentary Secretary for Trade	14 September 2010	4 February 2013	2 years, 143 days
10	Kelvin Thomson	Labor	Gillard	Parliamentary Secretary for Trade	4 February 2013	1 June 2013	117 days
11	Steven Ciobo	Liberal	Abbott	Parliamentary Secretary to the Minister for Trade and Investment	23 December 2014	21 September 2015	272 days
12	Keith Pitt	National	Turnbull	Assistant Minister for Trade, Tourism and Investment	19 July 2016	20 December 2017	1 year, 154 days
13	Luke Hartsuyker	National	Turnbull	Assistant Minister for Trade, Tourism and Investment	20 December 2017	26 February 2018	68 days
14	Mark Coulton	National	Turnbull	Assistant Minister for Trade, Tourism and Investment	5 March 2018	29 May 2019	1 year, 345 days
14	Mark Coulton	National	Morrison	Assistant Minister for Trade and Investment	29 May 2019	6 February 2020	1 year, 345 days
15	Tim Ayres	Labor	Albanese	Assistant Minister for Trade	1 June 2022	13 May 2025	2 years, 346 days
16	Matt Thistlethwaite	Labor	Albanese	Assistant Minister for Foreign Affairs and Trade	13 May 2025	Incumbent	1 year, 118 days

=== List of assistant ministers for tourism ===
Order	Minister	Party	Prime Minister	Title	Term start	Term end	Term in office	Reference
1	Keith Pitt	National	Turnbull	Assistant Minister for Trade, Tourism and Investment	19 July 2016	20 December 2017	1 year, 154 days	
2	Luke Hartsuyker	National	Turnbull	Assistant Minister for Trade, Tourism and Investment	20 December 2017	26 February 2018	68 days	
3	Mark Coulton	National	Turnbull	Assistant Minister for Trade, Tourism and Investment	5 March 2018	29 May 2019	1 year, 85 days	
4	Jonathon Duniam	Liberal	Morrison	Assistant Minister for Regional Tourism	29 May 2019	23 May 2022	2 years, 359 days	
5	Nita Green	Labor	Albanese	Assistant Minister for Tourism	13 May 2025	Incumbent	1 year, 117 days	

== See also ==
- Minister for Industry and Trade (New South Wales)
- Minister for Jobs and Tourism (New South Wales)
- Minister for Tourism (Victoria)
- Minister for Tourism (Western Australia)
