= Stuart Harris (political scientist) =

Australian public servant and academic (1931–2024)

Professor Stuart Harris AO FASSA
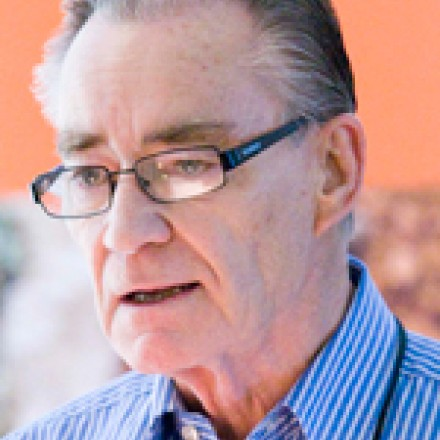
- Stuart Harris at the Australian National University in Canberra

Professor, International Relations, Australian National University
- In office 1989 – 1996; Emeritus Professor, 1996–2015

Secretary of the Department of Foreign Affairs and Trade
- In office 24 July 1987 – 3 July 1988

Secretary of the Department of Foreign Affairs
- In office 3 September 1984 – 24 July 1987

Personal details
- Born: Stuart Francis Harris; 14 March 1931 London, England
- Died: 5 October 2024 (aged 93) Kingston, Australia
- Spouse: Pamela Harris (m. 1958)
- Education: University of Sydney; Australian National University
- Occupation: Public servant and academic

Stuart Francis Harris AO (14 March 1931 – 5 October 2024) was an Australian senior public servant and academic.

== Early life ==
Harris was born and grew up in London, England, attending Tottenham Grammar School. In 1947, at age 16, he moved to Australia under the auspices of the Big Brother Movement, a scheme to facilitate young Britons to move to Australia and work on the land. After some time working on farms, Harris took a job at the Sydney Branch of the Commonwealth Taxation Department and enrolled in evening classes in economics at the University of Sydney, eventually winning a government scholarship to complete his honours year, achieving his degree in 1956.

== Career ==
After completing his honours degree, Harris transferred to Canberra, initially with the Taxation Department, before moving to the Department of Trade, where he began working closely with (later Sir) John Crawford, who facilitated his gaining a Public Service Fellowship at the Australian National University which enabled Harris to undertake a PhD.

In 1962 Harris joined the then Bureau of Agricultural Economics (BAE), now the Australian Bureau of Agricultural and Resource Economics and Sciences, initially as the senior economist. Taking leave from the BAE in 1967-68, Harris worked with the Colombian government on land reform as part of the Harvard Advisory Service mission there. He returned to Australia in mid-1968 to take up the position of Director, BAE, where he was considered to have "contributed to the development of a more professional approach to policy analysis in the BAE". He also initiated the annual Agricultural Outlook Conference, which continues to this day.

Between 1972 and 1975 Harris was a Deputy Secretary of the Department of Overseas Trade. During his time in the public service, Harris contributed to a number of major government inquiries, such as The Committee of Economic Enquiry (Vernon Report, 1965). In 1974 he led the working group that produced the report on The Principles of Rural Policy in Australia in 1974 which attracted attention from the academic and policy community at the time. In the following year, Harris chaired the Task Force on Economic Policy, which published the report The Processes of Economic Policy Making in Australia (as part of the Royal Commission on Australian Government). The Task Force also included noted economists Ian Castles and Robert Gregory as members.

In 1975, Harris moved to the Australian National University where he was appointed to the Chair of Resource Economics in the Centre for Resource and Environmental Studies (later renamed the Fenner School of Environment and Society). He took on the position of Director of the Centre from 1982 to 1984.

Harris was appointed secretary of the Department of Foreign Affairs (DFA) in September 1984 . In 1986, he published a major report on the role of the DFA in his Review of Australia's Overseas Representation. Harris then oversaw the transition in administrative arrangements in which the Department of Foreign Affairs was reorganised and the expanded Department of Foreign Affairs and Trade was established. Harris retired as secretary of the department in 1988.

After leaving the public service, Harris returned to academic life at the ANU, as Professor of International Relations, specialising in Northeast Asia, particularly China. In 1989, Harris was one of the three chairs appointed to lead the Ecologically Sustainable Development Process, commissioned by the Hawke Government. Based on extensive consultation the chairs presented 9 sectoral papers in 1991 and two further reports on intersectoral issues and greenhouse in 1992.

After his retirement in 1996, Harris continued research on China's foreign policy and global relationships as an Emeritus Professor at the Australian National University.

== Death ==
Harris died in Kingston, Australian Capital Territory, on 5 October 2024, at the age of 93.

== Awards ==
Harris was made a Fellow of the Academy of the Social Sciences in Australia in 1982. In the 1989 Birthday Honours Harris was made an Officer of the Order of Australia in recognition of distinguished public service. In 2000, Harris was made a Distinguished Fellow of the Australasian Agricultural and Resource Economics Society. Harris was awarded an honorary D.Litt by Murdoch University in 2013.

== References and further reading ==
- Harris, Stuart (August 2008), "Chapter 3: Secretary of the Department of Foreign Affairs, 1984–87, and Department of Foreign Affairs and Trade, 1987–88" ( (PDF)), in Wilson, Trevor; Cooke, Graham (eds.), Steady Hands Needed: Reflections on the role of the Secretary of Foreign Affairs and Trade in Australia 1979-1999, ANU E Press, pp. 27–37, ISBN 9781921536137, archived from the original on 8 February 2014

Government offices
| Preceded by Peter Henderson | Secretary of the Department of Foreign Affairs; 1984 – 1987 | Succeeded by Himself as Secretary of the Department of Foreign Affairs and Trade |
| Preceded by Himself as Secretary of the Department of Foreign Affairs | Secretary of the Department of Foreign Affairs and Trade; 1987 – 1988 | Succeeded by Richard Woolcott |
| Preceded by Vince FitzGerald as Secretary of the Department of Trade | Secretary of the Department of Foreign Affairs and Trade; 1987 – 1988 | Succeeded by Richard Woolcott |
