= Anika Molesworth =

Australian scientist, and activist

Dr Anika Molesworth
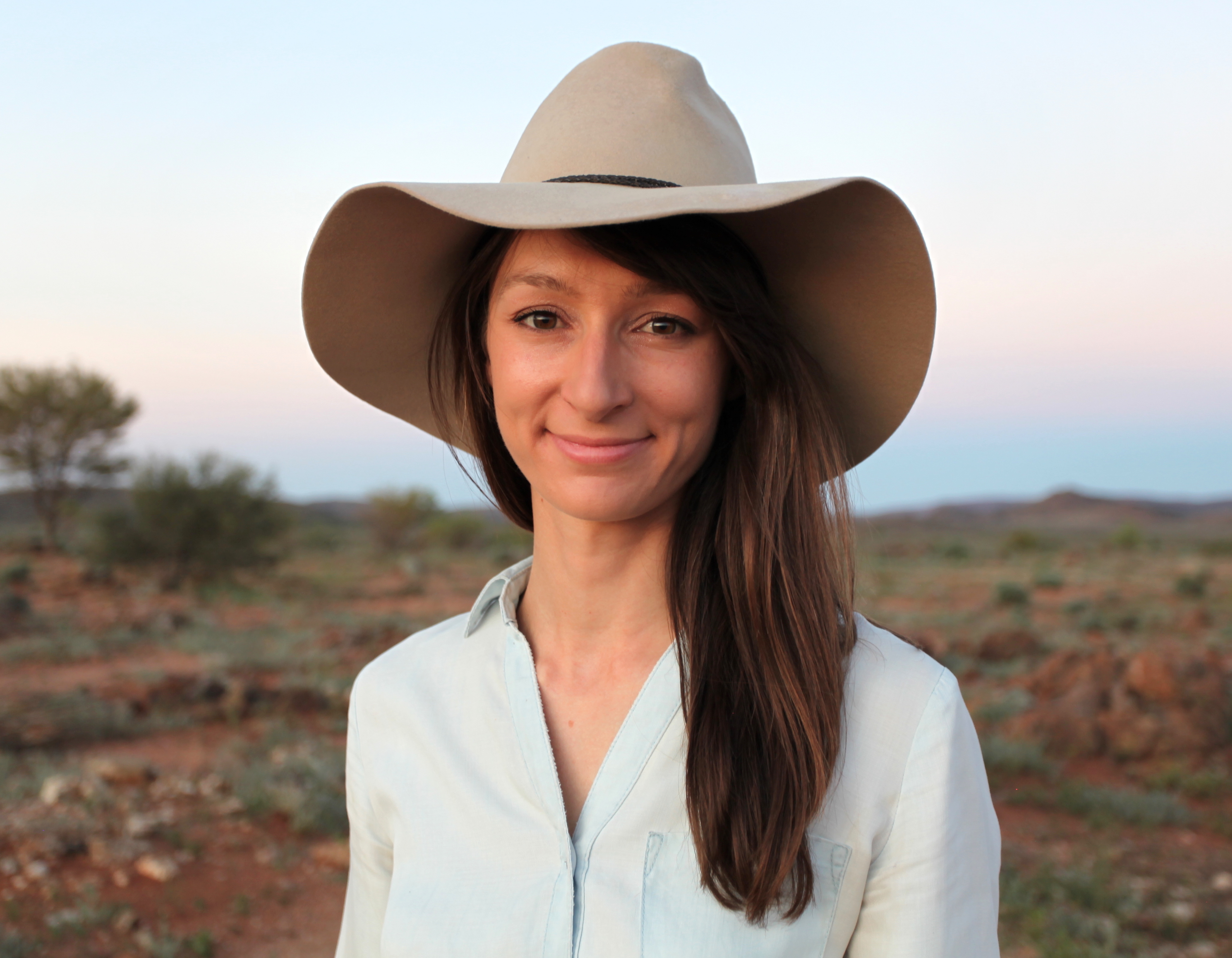
- Born: Melbourne, Victoria, Australia
- Education: Charles Sturt University, Deakin University
- Occupations: Agroecology scientist, Climate change science communicator
- Known for: Climate change and food systems advocacy
- Awards: Woman of Influence, 2019 Young Australian of the Year, NSW Finalist, 2017 Young Farmer of the Year, 2015
- Website: https://www.anikamolesworth.com

Anika Molesworth is an Australian agroecologist and scientist. She is a public figure on issues of food security, nature conservation, climate change and rural community development. Molesworth currently sits on the Board of Directors of Farmers for Climate Action, the NSW committee of the Crawford Fund, and is a Governor of WWF-Australia.

== Early life and education ==
Molesworth was born in Melbourne, Victoria, Australia. She studied a Bachelor of Science specialising in Agribusiness at Charles Sturt University (2007–2010), a Masters of Sustainable Agriculture at Charles Sturt University (graduating with Distinction) (2012–2015), and a PhD in Agroecosystems at Deakin University (2016–2020).

== Career ==
Molesworth is an Australian agroecology scientist, farmer and public commentator on climate change, farming and food systems.

In 2014, Molesworth established Climate Wise Agriculture, which is a platform that shares knowledge on the topic of climate change as it relates to agriculture. She is a Founding Director of Farmers for Climate Action, a farmer-led organisation that advocates for climate solutions which support rural communities. She was appointed Deputy Chair of the organisation in 2020.

Molesworth has worked in international agricultural development since 2014, including several projects with the Australian Centre for International Agricultural Research. Her research has focused on improving the environmental conditions and livelihoods of subsistence farmers. She was appointed to the NSW committee of the Crawford Fund in 2018, which supports research and development in agriculture. Molesworth joined The Climate Reality Project in 2016, and under the guidance of its Founder and Chair Al Gore, became a Climate Reality Mentor in 2019. Later that year, she travelled to Antarctica with the largest ever expedition of women in STEM. Her involvement with Homeward Bound has positioned her as an advocate for gender equity, rural youth and climate change leadership.

As a prominent science communicator and frequent media commentator, Molesworth has had her work reported in The New York Times, The Guardian, The Conversation, ABC, SBS, and other media outlets. She has contributed to reports with the Climate Council and the Commission of the Human Future. In 2017, Molesworth presented a TEDxSydney Youth talk “Farmers are key to a better future.” Her first book is due to be published in 2021 by Pan Macmillan Publishers.

== Awards and honours ==
- 2020 Emily Hensley Award, Melbourne Girls Grammar
- 2019 Woman of Influence Award, Australian Financial Review
- 2019 Future Shapers Award, Women of Style and Audi
- 2019 Homeward Bound ambassador
- 2018 Young Sustainability Champion Award, Green Globe Awards
- 2018 Heroes of a Low-Carbon Economy Youth Champion, 350.org
- 2018 NSW/ACT Regional Achievement and Community Award for Agricultural Innovation
- 2017 Young Australian of the Year, NSW Finalist
- 2017 NSW/ACT Young Achiever Award for Environment and Sustainability
- 2017 TEDxSydney Youth presenter
- 2016 Hidden Treasures Honour Roll, NSW Department of Primary Industries
- 2015 Australian National Young Farmer of the Year, ABC Rural and Kondinin Group
- 2015 Crawford Fund Young Scholar
- 2015 Delegate at United Nations Conference on Climate Change, Paris
- 2014 Young Farming Champion, Art4Agriculture
- 2014 Top 100 Women in Australian Agribusiness (Emerald Grain and Fairfax Agricultural Media)
