= Engledow =

Engledow is a surname. Notable people with the surname include:

- Charles John Engledow (1860–1932), British military officer and politician
- Dave Engledow, American photographer
- Frank Engledow (1890–1985), British botanist
- Lou Engledow, Australian public servant
