= Department of the Special Minister of State =

Department of the Special Minister of State may refer to:

- Department of the Special Minister of State (1972–75), an Australian government department
- Department of the Special Minister of State (1983–87), an Australian government department
