= Department of Secondary Industry =

Australian government department, 1972–1974

Department overview
- Formed: 19 December 1972
- Preceding Department: Department of Shipping and Transport Department of Trade and Industry
- Dissolved: 12 June 1974
- Superseding Department: Department of Overseas Trade Department of Manufacturing Industry
- Jurisdiction: Commonwealth of Australia
- Headquarters: Parkes, Canberra
- Ministers responsible: Jim Cairns, Minister (1972–1973); Kep Enderby, Minister (1973–1974)
- Department executives: Doug McKay, Acting Secretary (1972–1973); Frank Pryor, Secretary (1973–1974)

The Department of Secondary Industry was an Australian government department that existed between December 1972 and June 1974 under the Whitlam government.

== History ==
The Department had previously been located inside the Department of Trade and Industry as the Office of Secondary Industry. In July 1972 the Australian Government approved the creation of 25 new positions in the Office of Secondary Industry, an opportunity to set up the nucleus for a full-scale Department of Secondary Industry, which was established in December 1972.

The Department was abolished in June 1974 when it was merged with the Department of Supply to form the Department of Manufacturing Industry.

== Scope ==
Information about the department's functions and government funding allocation could be found in the Administrative Arrangements Orders, the annual Portfolio Budget Statements and in the Department's annual reports.

At its creation the Department dealt with secondary industry, including:

- The efficiency and development of industries
- Research
- Shipbuilding

== Structure ==
The Department was an Australian Public Service department, staffed by officials who were responsible to the Minister for Secondary Industry.
