= Doug McKay (public servant) =

Australian public servant (1923–2012)

Doug McKay CBE

Acting Secretary of the Department of Trade and Industry
- In office 1 February 1971 – 19 December 1972

Acting Secretary of the Department of Tourism and Recreation
- In office 19 December 1972 – 9 January 1973

Acting Secretary of the Department of Secondary Industry
- In office 19 December 1972 – 9 January 1973

Secretary of the Department of Overseas Trade
- In office 19 December 1972 – 20 December 1977

Secretary of the Department of Primary Industry
- In office 18 May 1978 – 11 March 1980

Personal details
- Born: Douglas Henry McKay; 5 September 1923 North Sydney
- Died: 7 July 2012 (aged 88) Canberra
- Spouse: Ruth
- Children: 3
- Parent(s): Oswald McKay and Doris McKay (née Twyford)
- Education: University of Sydney
- Occupation: Public servant

Douglas Henry McKay CBE (5 September 1923 – 7 July 2012) was a senior Australian public servant.

== Life and career ==
Doug McKay was born in North Sydney on 5 September 1923, growing up around Tumbarumba then Narrandera in southern New South Wales.

In 1971, McKay was appointed Secretary of the Department of Trade and Industry.

Between December 1972 and January 1973, McKay was Acting Secretary of the Department of Tourism and Recreation as well as the Department of Secondary Industry, while serving as permanent head of trade department (which had since become the Department of Overseas Trade).

In 1978, he was appointed Secretary of the Department of Primary Industry. Before retiring in 1980, McKay went on extended sick leave.

McKay died in Canberra on 7 July 2012.

== Awards ==
Doug McKay was made a Civil Officer of the Order of the British Empire in January 1966 for his public service.

== References and further reading ==
- DOUGLAS HENRY McKAY, CBE, 1923-2012, Australian Agricultural & Resource Economics Society, archived from the original on 2 February 2014
- DOUGLAS HENRY McKAY, CBE, 1923-2012, Australian Agricultural & Resource Economics Society, archived from the original on 27 February 2014
- Davey, Paul (2008), Politics in the Blood: The Anthonys of Richmond, University of New South Wales, p. 196, ISBN 978-1-921410-23-9
- Fraser, Malcolm (20 December 1977). "Senior Public Service Appointments" (Press release). Archived from the original on 27 February 2014.

Government offices
Preceded by Alan Westerman	Secretary of the Department of Trade and Industry; 1971 – 1972	Succeeded by Himself as Secretary of the Department of Overseas Trade
Preceded by Himself as Secretary of the Department of Trade and Industry	Secretary of the Department of Overseas Trade; 1972 – 1977	Succeeded by Jim Scully as Secretary of the Department of Trade and Resources
New title Department established	Secretary of the Department of Tourism and Recreation (Acting); 1972 – 1973	Succeeded by Lloyd Bott
New title Department established	Secretary of the Department of Secondary Industry (Acting); 1972 – 1973	Succeeded by Frank Pryor
Preceded by Walter Ives	Secretary of the Department of Primary Industry; 1978 – 1980	Succeeded by Lindsay Duthie
