= Department of Minerals and Energy (Australia) =

Australian government department, 1972–1975

Department overview
- Formed: 19 December 1972; 53 years ago
- Preceding Department: Department of National Development (I)
- Dissolved: 22 December 1975; 50 years ago
- Superseding Department: Department of Science (II) Department of National Resources
- Jurisdiction: Commonwealth of Australia
- Headquarters: Canberra
- Ministers responsible: Rex Connor, Minister (1972–1975); Ken Wriedt, Minister (1975); Doug Anthony, Minister (1975)
- Department executives: Lloyd Bott, Acting Secretary (1972); Lenox Hewitt, Secretary (1972–1975); Jim Scully, Secretary (1975)

The Department of Minerals and Energy was an Australian government department that existed between December 1972 and December 1975.

== History ==
The department was one of several new departments established by the Whitlam government, a wide restructuring that revealed some of the new government's program. The department was dissolved shortly after the dismissal of the government in 1975.

== Scope ==
Information about the department's functions and government funding allocation could be found in the Administrative Arrangements Orders, the annual Portfolio Budget Statements and in the department's annual reports.

According to the National Archives of Australia, at its creation, the department was responsible for:

- Evaluation and balanced development of minerals and energy resources having regard to future requirements
- Geodetic surveying, and the production of topographical maps, for Commonwealth purposes

In June 1975, the department adopted matters from the Department of Science (I) when it was reformed into the Department of Science and Consumer Affairs.

== Structure ==
The department was an Australian Public Service department, staffed by officials who were responsible to the Minister for Minerals and Energy.

The department was headed by a Secretary, initially Lloyd Bott (acting until December 1972) and followed by Lenox Hewitt (December 1972 to August 1975) and Jim Scully (August 1975 until the department's abolition).
