= Beth Woods =

- Born: Elizabeth Jean Woods; October 18, 1955 (age 71); Brisbane, Queensland, Australia
- Known for: Agricultural economics, Rhodes Scholar

Elizabeth Jean Woods (born 18 October 1955) is an agriculture expert and the former Director-General of the Queensland Department of Agriculture, Fisheries and Forestry. She was also the Chair of the WorldFish Board of Trustees, an international non-profit organization whose mission is to harness the potential of aquaculture to reduce hunger and poverty in developing countries, until June 2017. Alongside that, Woods is also a professor of Agribusiness at the University of Queensland.

== Early life and education ==
Woods received her Bachelor of Science in Aquaculture with First Class Honors from the University of Queensland. She then went on to become one of the first female Rhodes Scholars and completed her Doctor of Philosophy in Agricultural economics at the University of Oxford.

== Career and notable achievements ==
She began her career as a Manager of Farming Systems at the Queensland Department of Primary Industries, and for her successful work she received the medal of Order of Australia. From 1991 to 1997, Woods was a Member of the Australian Centre for International Agricultural Research, which she later chaired. She has served as a board member of many organizations and committees, such as the ACIAR, the Grains Research and Development Corporation, CSIRO (Commonwealth Scientific and Industrial Research Organisation), Rural Adjustment Scheme Advisory Council, and the Gatton College Council. In addition to that, she has chaired for the Rural Industries Research and Development Corporation, International Rice Research Institute, and the 2004 National Drought Policy Review.

Woods retired from her role as Director-General of the Department of Agriculture and Fisheries in Queensland, in January 2021.
