= New Matilda =

Australian news website

- Website type: Online magazine
- Available in: English
- Owner: Cordell Media Pty Ltd
- Editor: Chris Graham
- Website: newmatilda.com
- Commercial: Yes
- Registration: None available
- Launched: August 2004; 22 years ago

newmatilda.com, commonly known as New Matilda, is a left-wing independent Australian website of news, analysis and satire.

== History ==
The website was established by John Menadue in August 2004. Its founding editor was Natasha Cica. The website is now registered in the name of Cordell Media Pty Ltd. In May 2007, the policy section of newmatilda.com separated to become the Centre for Policy Development, a left-wing think tank.

On 27 May 2010, editor Marni Cordell announced that the publication would cease on 25 June, due to financial support drying up. On 8 October 2010, Cordell announced that newmatilda.com would be returning as a reader supported site. The site raised more than $150,000 in a six-week fundraising campaign and is now back up and running and publishing daily. However, webanalytics for January 2016 showed the site was barely performing, rated at 2989 for Australian sites, compared to, for example, 36 for The Age, or 936 for Crikey.com.

In May 2014, Cordell announced her resignation and painted an uncertain future for New Matilda. Since then it has continued publishing under its new editor Chris Graham, an investigative journalist and former editor of the National Indigenous Times.

== Content ==
The website publishes around 20 articles per week covering Australian politics, business, consumerism, capitalism, race relations, civil society, international affairs, media and culture. Including editorials, a total of 288 articles were published in 2004, 660 articles in 2005, 636 articles in 2006, 631 articles in 2007, 755 articles in 2008 and 736 articles in 2009.

=== Political cartoons ===
Beginning in May 2008, the website featured the satirist cartoons of Bill Leak. They have since denounced Leak many times, in very strong terms, the most recent being in March 2017, by Michael Brull. The title was "RIP Bill Leak… You Boring Racist Who Ran With The Pack And Upheld Every Murdoch Orthodoxy".
