= John Crawford (economist) =

Australian economist (1910–1984)

Sir John Crawford AC CBE

Secretary of the Department of Commerce and Agriculture
- In office 4 May 1950 – 11 January 1956

Secretary of the Department of Primary Industry
- In office 11 January 1956 – 15 February 1956

Secretary of the Department of Trade
- In office 11 January 1956 – 31 August 1960

Personal details
- Born: John Grenfell Crawford; 4 April 1910 Hurstville, Sydney
- Died: 28 October 1984 (aged 74) Canberra, Australia
- Spouse: Lady Jessie Crawford (née Morgan)
- Children: One daughter
- Education: University of Sydney
- Occupation: Economist and administrator

Sir John Grenfell Crawford AC CBE (4 April 1910 – 28 October 1984) was an agricultural economist and a key architect of Australia's post-war growth.

== Early life, education and family ==
Born in Hurstville, Sydney, Crawford was the tenth of twelve children of Henry Crawford and Harriet Isabel Crawford, née Wood. He was the younger brother of historian Max Crawford and a nephew of state MPs James Crawford and Thomas Crawford. Crawford was educated at Sydney Boys High School and the University of Sydney.

Crawford married Jessie Morgan on 18 May 1935 and together they had a daughter.

== Career ==
In 1941, Crawford helped to create the Agricultural Economics Section of the New South Wales Government's Department of Agriculture.

In 1942, he began working at the Department of War Organisation of Industry, before being appointed Director of Research at the Department of Post-War Reconstruction in 1943. In 1945, he was appointed inaugural Director of the Bureau of Agricultural Economics, followed by Secretary of the Department of Commerce and Agriculture (later Department of Trade), and then Secretary of the Department of Trade, where he played an important role in forging new trade relationships with the United Kingdom and Japan.

He helped to establish the Australian Development Assistance Agency (now Australian Aid), the Industries Assistance Commission, and Consultative Group on International Agricultural Research. He was also an adviser to the World Bank, Washington D.C., and Director, Australian Japanese Economic Research Project.

Crawford was a founding member and inaugural chair of the Australian Centre for International Agricultural Research, a statutory authority focusing on improving sustainable production in developing countries. He was also first chair of the Technical Advisory Committee to CGIAR (formerly Consultative Group for International Agricultural Research) from 1971 to 1976.

Crawford held several positions at the Australian National University: Director of the Research School of Pacific (and Asian) Studies (1960-1967); Vice-Chancellor (1968-1973); and then Chancellor (1976–1984).

== Recognition and awards ==
Crawford was appointed a Commander of the Order of British Empire (CBE) in the 1954 New Years Honours List.

He was knighted in the 1959 New Years Honours List.

In the 1978 Australia Day Honours List, he was made a Companion of the Order of Australia (AC).

He was the second president of the Australian Agricultural Economics Society, and in 1983 was made an honorary life member.

He was named Australian of the Year in 1981.

In 2009, a street in the Canberra suburb of Casey was named John Crawford Crescent in Crawford's honour.

=== Legacy at ANU ===
The Crawford School of Public Policy is named after Crawford, and the school runs the annual Crawford Leadership Forum, opened by the J. G. Crawford Oration. It is also hosts the Sir John G Crawford Chair in Agricultural Economics.

The J.G. Crawford Prize was established by ANU in 1973, as Crawford was ending his term as vice-chancellor, in recognition of his contribution to the university. PhD Graduate students are nominated by college deans, and two (one for the natural sciences and one for social sciences/ humanities) and occasionally a third (for interdisciplinary work) are selected on the basis of academic excellence by a committee.

Since mid-2013 and as of July 2021, the ANU is undertaking a research project with the title "J.G. Crawford: Shaping Australia's Place in the World". Partnered by the Department of Foreign Affairs and Trade and the Crawford Fund, the project won an ARC Linkage Grant worth A$197,580. A biography will be written by historian Nicholas Brown, while Frank Bongiorno is also involved in the project.

=== Crawford Fund ===
The Crawford Fund, a body established in Australia to support international agricultural research, was also named in his honour. The fund awards the annual Sir John Crawford Fellowship to support scientists from developing countries, and since 1985 has hosted the Sir John Crawford Memorial Address. Notable speakers include Ross Garnaut, Frances Adamson, Catherine Bertini, Florence Chenoweth, Craig Venter, Shridath Ramphal and Robert McNamara.

Government offices
Preceded by Edwin McCarthy	Secretary of the Department of Commerce and Agriculture; 1950–1956	Succeeded by Himself as Secretary of the Department of Primary Industry
Preceded by Edwin McCarthy	Secretary of the Department of Commerce and Agriculture; 1950–1956	Succeeded by Himself as Secretary of the Department of Trade
Preceded by Himself as Secretary of the Department of Commerce and Agriculture	Secretary of the Department of Primary Industry; 1956	Succeeded by Jim Moroney
Preceded by Himself as Secretary of the Department of Commerce and Agriculture	Secretary of the Department of Trade; 1956–1960	Succeeded by Alan Westerman
Academic offices
Preceded by H. C. Coombs	Chancellor of the Australian National University; 1976–1984	Succeeded by Richard Blackburn
Preceded by Sir Leonard Huxley	4th Vice-Chancellor of the Australian National University; 1968–1973	Succeeded by Robert Williams
