= Jim Scully (public servant) =

Australian public servant

Jim Scully AO

Secretary of the Department of Trade
- In office 11 March 1983 – 1 March 1984

Secretary of the Department of Trade and Resources
- In office 20 December 1977 – 11 March 1983

Secretary of the Department of National Resources
- In office 22 December 1975 – 20 December 1977

Secretary of the Department of Minerals and Energy
- In office 24 August 1975 – 22 December 1975

Personal details
- Born: James Scully
- Spouse: Norma
- Parent(s): William Scully and Grace Myrtle Kilbride
- Occupation: Public servant

James Scully AO (April 27, 1927 - December 10, 2025) was a retired senior Australian public servant. He is best known for his time in the Australian Government trade department.

== Life and career ==
Scully was the son of William Scully, a federal Labor MP and government minister. He studied English and History at the University of Sydney, going on to join the Australian Public Service in 1949, in the Department of Trade and Customs as a junior clerk.

Between 1961 and 1963, Scully was Assistant Trade Commissioner in Cairo. In 1967, Scully was appointed a First Assistant Secretary in the Department of Trade and Industry, heading the trade services section.

In August 1975, Scully was appointed to his first Secretary role, heading the Department of Minerals and Energy. He went on to fill the Secretary position at the Department of National Resources (1975–1977), the Department of Trade and Resources (1977–1983) and the Department of Trade (1983–1984). In 1981, he led bilateral talks on resources development with South Korea.

After retiring from the public service, Scully moved into a private sector career. He headed an independent committee advising the ACT Government on the Very Fast Train project.

For a time in the 1990s, Scully was a director at Westpac. He resigned following a September 1992 board meeting in which a loss of $1.5 billion was announced.

== Awards ==
Scully was made an Officer of the Order of Australia in January 1984 for his public service.

Government offices
Preceded by Lenox Hewitt	Secretary of the Department of Minerals and Energy; 1975	Succeeded by Himself as Secretary of the Department of National Resources
Preceded by Himself as Secretary of the Department of Minerals and Energy	Secretary of the Department of National Resources; 1975–1977	Succeeded by Himself as Secretary of the Department of Trade and Resources
Preceded by Himself as Secretary of the Department of Minerals and Energy	Secretary of the Department of National Resources; 1975–1977	Succeeded by Alan Woods as Secretary of the Department of National Development
Preceded by Himself as Secretary of the Department of Minerals and Energy	Secretary of the Department of Trade and Resources; 1977–1983	Succeeded by Alan Woods as Secretary of the Department of Resources and Energy
Preceded by Himself as Secretary of the Department of Minerals and Energy	Secretary of the Department of Trade and Resources; 1977–1983	Succeeded by Himself as Secretary of the Department of Trade
Preceded by Himself as Secretary of the Department of Trade and Resources	Secretary of the Department of Trade; 1983–1984	Succeeded by John Menadue
