= Department of Immigration and Ethnic Affairs (1975–1987) =

Australian government department, 1975–1987

Department overview
- Formed: 22 December 1975
- Preceding Department: Department of Labor and Immigration
- Dissolved: 24 July 1987
- Superseding Department: Department of Immigration, Local Government and Ethnic Affairs
- Jurisdiction: Commonwealth of Australia
- Headquarters: Canberra
- Department executives: Lloyd Bott, Secretary (1975–1977); Lou Engledow, Secretary (1977–1980); John Menadue, Secretary (1980–1983); Bill McKinnon, Secretary (1983–1987); Ron Brown, Secretary (1987)

The Department of Immigration and Ethnic Affairs was an Australian government department that existed between December 1975 and July 1987.

== History ==
The department was announced in December 1975, resulting from the abolition of the previous Department of Labor and Immigration. The creation of the department was an election commitment that Malcolm Fraser said indicated the importance placed by the Fraser government on Australia's immigration program and the Coalition's concern that issues affecting migrants and their families should receive close and sympathetic attention.

== Scope ==
Information about the department's functions and government funding allocation could be found in the Administrative Arrangements Orders, the annual Portfolio Budget Statements and in the department's annual reports.

According to the Administrative Arrangements Order made on 22 December 1975 (reproduced by the National Archives), the department dealt with:

- Migration
- Naturalization and aliens

== Minister for Immigration and Ethnic Affairs ==
The department was an Australian Public Service department, staffed by officials who were responsible to the Minister for Immigration and Ethnic Affairs.

During the department's existence, the following people were appointed as Minister for Immigration and Ethnic Affairs.

Minister	Party	Prime Minister	Term
Michael MacKellar	Liberal	Malcolm Fraser	20 December 1975 – 8 December 1979
Ian Macphee	Liberal	Malcolm Fraser	08 Dec 1979 – 07 May 1982
Peter Durack	Liberal	Malcolm Fraser	7 June 1981 – 7 July 1981
John Hodges	Liberal	Malcolm Fraser	7 May 1982 – 11 March 1983
Stewart West	Labor	Bob Hawke	11 March 1983 – 13 December 1984
Chris Hurford	Labor	Bob Hawke	13 December 1984 – 16 February 1987
Mick Young	Labor	Bob Hawke	16 February 1987 – 24 July 1987
