= Bill McKinnon (public servant) =

Australian public servant (1931–1988)

Bill McKinnon CBE

Secretary of the Department of Immigration and Ethnic Affairs
- In office 25 March 1983 – 24 July 1987

Personal details
- Born: 23 February 1931
- Died: 10 December 1988 (aged 57)
- Education: University of Melbourne; University of Sydney; Macquarie University
- Occupation: Public servant

William Allan McKinnon CBE (23 February 1931 – 10 December 1988) was a senior Australian public servant. He was Secretary of the Department of Immigration and Ethnic Affairs between 1983 and 1987.

== Early life ==
Bill McKinnon was born on 23 February 1931.

== Career ==
As General Manager, later Director, of the Australian Industry Development Corporation between 1972 and 1976, McKinnon played a major role establishing and developing the corporation. He moved to the Industries Assistance Commission in 1976, serving there as deputy chairman and then chairman.

McKinnon was appointed Secretary of the Department of Immigration and Ethnic Affairs in 1983. As head of the Immigration department, he oversaw transition of immigration considerations to an environment where the department was more concerned with the economic viability of immigrants.

In 1987, McKinnon lost his job as head of the department, perhaps due to his role in the approval of Australian residency for Taj El-Din Hilaly, a prominent Sydney Sunni Muslim leader. Paul Keating had personally approved Sheik Hilali's residency while Acting Prime Minister during a period that Prime Minister Bob Hawke was away.

McKinnon went from his Secretary role into a position as the Australian High Commissioner to New Zealand.

== Awards ==
McKinnon was made a Commander of the Order of the British Empire in December 1982.

Government offices
Preceded by John Menadue	Secretary of the Department of Immigration and Ethnic Affairs; 1983 – 1987	Succeeded by Ron Brown
Diplomatic posts
Preceded by Les Johnson	Australian High Commissioner to New Zealand; 1987 – 1988	Succeeded by Robert Laurie
