= International Crop Information System =

The International Crop Information System (ICIS) was an open-source database system led by researchers from the International Rice Research Institute (IRRI) that provided integrated management of global information on crop improvement and management both for individual crops and for farming systems.

The project was motivated by ambiguous germplasm identification, difficulty in tracing pedigree information, and the lack of integration between genetic resources, breeding, evaluation, utilization, and management data, all of which constrained the development of more knowledge-intensive crop research efforts.

In conjunction with the IRRI, the ICIS was developed by agricultural scientists and information technicians in several centers of the Consultative Group for International Agricultural Research (CGIAR), in Advanced Research Institutions (ARIs), and in National Agricultural Research Systems (NARSs) to address these constraints.

The project was discontinued in 2011.

== Implementations ==
The rice implementation of the ICIS was referred to as the "International Rice Information System", or "IRIS". There were other implementations for other crops, including a wheat implementation known as "IWIS", one for lentils known as "ILIS", chickpeas "IChIS", faba bean "IFIS", and more.
