= Vince FitzGerald =

Vince Fitzgerald AO

Secretary of the Department of Trade
- In office 4 March 1986 – 24 July 1987

Secretary of the Department of Employment, Education and Training
- In office 24 July 1987 – 1 March 1989

Personal details
- Born: Vincent William John FitzGerald; 13 July 1944 (age 82) Cairns, Queensland, Australia
- Education: University of Queensland; Harvard University
- Occupation: Public servant

Vincent William John FitzGerald AO (born 13 July 1944) is a former senior Australian public servant, now a private consultant.

== Early life ==
Vince FitzGerald was schooled at St Augustine's College, Cairns. FitzGerald graduated from the University of Queensland in 1969 with a Bachelor of Economics with first class honours in Econometrics, and a University Medal.

== Career ==
FitzGerald joined the Australian Public Service in 1969 as a research officer with the Australian Bureau of Statistics.

In 1985, FitzGerald was appointed a Deputy Secretary in the Department of Trade. He was promoted to Secretary of the Department in March 1986.

In July 1987, FitzGerald was shifted to the newly created Department of Employment, Education and Training. FitzGerald left the role in 1989 to join the firm Allen Consulting, a higher-paid job in the private sector.

As a consultant, FitzGerald was the architect of the compulsory superannuation scheme introduced by the Keating government in 1992. Superannuation was later refined in response to FitzGerald's June 1993 publication National Savings: A Report to the Treasurer in which he identified the importance of national saving, and recommended ways in which national saving could be increased.

In 1995, Paul Keating called FitzGerald a "sour ex-bureaucrat" and claimed that FitzGerald had wanted to be Secretary of the Treasury but was upset to have never made it. This was a response to a criticism FitzGerald made to aspects of a Keating Budget.

== Awards ==
In June 2016, FitzGerald was made an Officer of the Order of Australia for distinguished services to business through executive and advisory roles in economic policy development, public administration and financial management organisations, and to the community.

Government offices
| Preceded by John Menadue | Secretary of the Department of Trade; 1986–1987 | Succeeded by Stuart Harris as Secretary of the Department of Foreign Affairs and Trade |
| Preceded by Helen Williams as Secretary of the Department of Education | Secretary of the Department of Employment, Education and Training; 1987–1989 | Succeeded by Greg Taylor |
