= Crawford Fund =

The Crawford Fund, established as an initiative of the Australian Academy of Technological Sciences and Engineering (ATSE) in 1987, is a national support organisation for international agricultural research.

== History ==
According to a paper prepared by its founder Derek Tribe in July 1998, the origins of the Crawford Fund derive from a May 1986 meeting of the Consultative Group on International Agricultural Research (CGIAR) in Ottawa which considered the need for “Broadening Support for International Agricultural Research”. The focus was to be on funding for the CGIAR Centres and increased public awareness of the benefits that flow from agricultural research for development. In order to carry the message to a range of audiences it was decided that national support organisations should be established in member countries, starting with the USA, the UK, Canada, and Australia.

During 1986, Tribe, with support from the Australian aid agency Australian Development Assistance Bureau (ADAB, later Australian Aid), the Australian Centre for International Agricultural Research (ACIAR) and the CGIAR Secretariat, explored the possibilities of establishing a national support organisation in Australia. Finding strong support in academic, political and business circles, he concluded that the Academy of Technological Sciences (and Engineering) would be an appropriate home for such an organisation.

The organisation was named the Crawford Fund in honour of Sir John Crawford.

== Purpose ==
At the time the Fund was established, ATSE defined its role as making "more widely known throughout Australia the benefits that accrue both internationally and to Australia from international agricultural research, and to encourage greater support for, and participation in, international agricultural R&D by Australian governmental and non-governmental organisations and, in particular, the industrial, farming and scientific communities in Australia".

After some years, an independent assessment determined that the Crawford Fund was "an independent and value-adding element of the Australian aid program". This stimulated the Australian Government to support the Fund’s mission: to increase Australians' engagement in international agricultural research, development and education for the benefit of developing countries and Australia.

== Governance ==
The Crawford Fund is governed by its own Board and includes the CEO. As of July 2021 the national chair of the Board is John Anderson AO.

== Activities ==
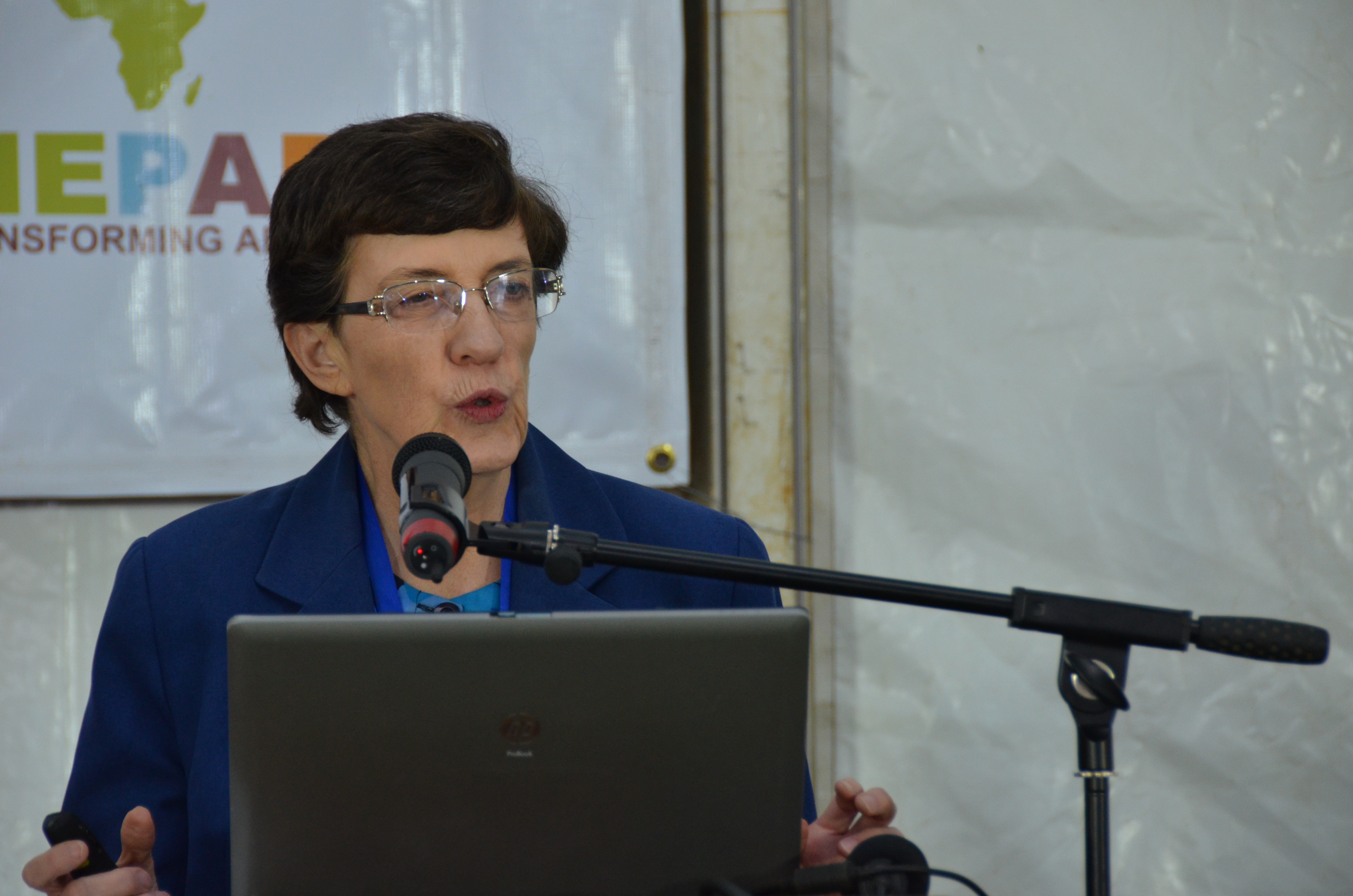
Gabrielle Persley, Research Study Director of the Crawford Fund, speaking at the ILRI, Feb 2016

The main activities of the Crawford Fund include awareness-raising to increase support for international agricultural research, the organisation of short-term practical training for agricultural researchers from developing countries, master classes for emerging research leaders, and two types of awards.

The Public Awareness Program includes an annual conference at Parliament House, Canberra. The annual conference focuses on a selected aspect of international agricultural research, showcasing eminent speakers and promoting an intensive round of high-level meetings and media publicity. Since 2010, conferences have included:

- Biodiversity and World Food Security (2010)
- The Supermarket Revolution in Food: Good, Bad or Ugly for the World's Farmers, Consumers and Retailers? (2011)
- The Scramble for Natural Resources: More Food, Less Land? (2012)
- Agriculture, Mining and Development: Bread from Stones? (2013)
- Ethics, Efficiency and Food Security: Feeding the 9 Billion Well (2014)
- The Business of Food Security: Profitability, Sustainability, and Risk (2015)
- Waste Not, Want Not: The Circular Economy to Food Production (2016)
- Transforming Lives and Livelihoods: The Digital Revolution in Agriculture (2017)

Since 1985 the Fund has hosted the Sir John Crawford Memorial Address. Notable speakers include Ross Garnaut, Frances Adamson, Catherine Bertini, Florence Chenoweth, Craig Venter, Shridath Ramphal and Robert McNamara.

The Crawford Fund supports a range of other activities designed to encourage public awareness of the importance of international agricultural research for development. The Fund supports the preparation of various publications. The Fund also organises other events such as meetings and conferences at the state level in Australia. For example, in 2011 the Crawford Fund sponsored a conference in Brisbane on the theme of 'A Food Secure World'. One of the aims of meetings of this kind is to provide the opportunity for eminent international speakers to address agricultural topics of global importance in Australia.

Since its establishment, the Crawford Fund has provided training to about 8,000 researchers, research managers and farmers in dozens of developing countries. Two kinds of training are provided:

- About 25 training awards are made each year to enable individual researchers from developing countries to undertake customised training in Australia in specific aspects of a wide range of topics in agriculture, forestry and horticulture.
- Additionally, about 30 multi-participant training courses are conducted each year either in developing countries or Australia, covering a wide range of topics in agriculture and forestry by teams of experts from CSIRO, universities, state agriculture departments, etc.

Approximately 40% of training awards and training courses are linked to ACIAR projects.

The Crawford Fund also conducts Master Classes. These are high-level courses aimed at mid-level researchers and emerging research managers who undertake a short period of training (typically two weeks) on particular research issues. The maximum number of participants in any one class is set at approximately 20 people. Participants are hand-picked, as are the trainers.

The Crawford Fund provides two prestigious training fellowships from a private donor:

- The Derek Tribe Award, awarded biennially to a senior researcher from a developing country; and
- The Sir John Crawford Fellowship, awarded annually to a young researcher from a developing country.
