= Department of Tourism and Recreation =

Australian government department, 1972–1975

Department overview
- Formed: 19 December 1972
- Preceding Department: Department of Health (I) – for national fitness councils Department of Trade and Industry
- Dissolved: 22 December 1975
- Superseding Department: Department of Environment, Housing and Community Development – for recreation Department of Industry and Commerce (I) – for tourism
- Jurisdiction: Commonwealth of Australia
- Headquarters: Canberra
- Ministers responsible: Frank Stewart, Minister (1972–1975); Reg Withers, Minister (1975)
- Department executives: Doug McKay, Acting Secretary (1972–1973); Lloyd Bott, Secretary (1973–1975)

The Department of Tourism and Recreation was an Australian government department that existed between December 1972 and December 1975.

== History ==
The Department was one of several new Departments established by the Whitlam government, a wide restructuring that revealed some of the new government's program.

Up until the Department of Tourism and Recreation was established, the prevailing view was that the Commonwealth Government generally had no role to play in relation to sport and recreation, which were instead matters for state and local governments.

Shortly after the Fraser government took office in November 1975, following the 1975 Australian constitutional crisis, the Department was abolished, with its functions taken up by other departments.

== Scope ==
Information about the department's functions and government funding allocation could be found in the Administrative Arrangements Orders, the annual Portfolio Budget Statements and in the Department's annual reports.

At its creation, the Department dealt with:

- Promotion of tourism in Australia and between other countries and Australia
- Regulation of the tourist industry
- Recreation, sport and physical culture

== Structure ==
The Department was an Australian Public Service department, staffed by officials who were responsible to the Minister for Tourism and Recreation.
