= Big Brother Movement =

Australian immigration scheme

The Big Brother Movement (BBM) was a youth migration program run by a non-profit organisation based in Sydney, Australia, that ran from 1924 to 1983. This program aimed to bring British youth to Australia to work on farms or in the Australian outback. The movement, founded in 1924 by Richard Linton, operated with the co-operation of the Australian Immigration Department. According to the Australian Dictionary of Biography, "the idea for the Big Brother Movement grew out of Linton's own experience of arriving in Sydney from New Zealand knowing that his elder brother was already there to assist him".

According to a book published on the subject, the so-called Little Brother immigrant was "assigned to a Big Brother, resident citizen for advice, solace and companionship" within the framework of the patrie (homeland).

Before World War II, around 8,000 young people immigrated to Australia under the scheme. It was revived after the war and continued in a modified form in New South Wales until 1983. The program sponsored around 12,000 people during this time.

In April 1947, the Movement purchased a 600-acre property known as “Karmsley Hills” at Bossley Park near Liverpool, NSW, for £15,000. This farm was dedicated as a memorial to the Little Brothers who had lost their lives in the war. Between 1947 and 1971, nearly 4,000 immigrants passed through the property. By the late 1950s, more immigrants were arriving for city work rather than farming. The average age of the arrivals until the 1960s was 16, but later arrivals tended to be up to 20 years old. In 1983, the sponsorship scheme ended because of changing migration rules, leading to the sale of the farm and the reinvestment of the funds. These funds enabled the organisation to evolve into BBM Ltd., which awarded the first scholarships in 1983.

BBM organises reunions and publishes a newsletter. The organisation maintains an electronic archive and historical records of the Little Brothers who arrived in Australia between 1925 and 1982. In many cases, this archive serves as the only official record of their journey to Australia. The original archive was handed over to the State Library of New South Wales in March 2023.

Notable "Little Brothers" included Bill Burns, Tony Bleasdale and Stuart Harris. Notable "Big Brothers" (or officeholders in the movement) included Archibald Gilchrist, Bill McCann and Leslie Morshead.

== See also ==
- Ten Pound Poms
