= Frank Pryor =

Frank Pryor OBE

Secretary of the Department of Secondary Industry
- In office 9 January 1973 – 12 June 1974

Personal details
- Born: Frank Commons Pryor; November 1919 Nyngan, New South Wales
- Died: November 1985 (aged 65–66) Canberra, Australian Capital Territory
- Spouse: Joan Adelaide Steer
- Education: University of Sydney
- Occupation: Public servant

Frank Commons Pryor OBE (1919-1985) was a senior Australia public servant.

== Life and career ==
Pryor graduated with first class honours in Philosophy from the University of Sydney, having been a member of the Philosophy Club there in 1939. Within a year of graduation, Pryor began his Australian Public Service career in the Department of the Treasury.

In November 1971, Pryor resigned from the Treasury after John Stone was appointed a Deputy Secretary in the Department. In December 1971 Pryor returned to the Australian Public Service as director of the Office of Secondary Industry within the Department of Trade and Industry.

In July 1972 the Australian Government approved the creation of 25 new positions in the Office of Secondary Industry, giving Pryor the opportunity to set up the nucleus for a full-scale Department of Secondary Industry.

In April 1973 the then Minister for Secondary Industry, Jim Cairns, proposed to Cabinet that Pryor be appointed to the board of the Australian Industry Development Corporation.

Pryor retired from the public service in 1984.

Pryor died in Canberra in November 1985.

== Awards ==
Frank Pryor was created an Officer of the Order of the British Empire in January 1970 while First Assistant Secretary of the Treasury.

Government offices
Preceded by Doug McKay (Acting)	Secretary of the Department of Secondary Industry; 1973 - 1974	Succeeded by Doug McKay as Secretary of the Department of Overseas Trade
Preceded by Doug McKay (Acting)	Secretary of the Department of Secondary Industry; 1973 - 1974	Succeeded by Neil Currie as Secretary of the Department of Manufacturing Industry
