= John Menadue =

Australian businessman and former diplomat (born 1935)

John Menadue AO

7th Australian Ambassador to Japan
- In office March 1977 – September 1980
- Prime Minister: Malcolm Fraser
- Preceded by: Mick Shann
- Succeeded by: James Plimsoll

Secretary of the Department of the Prime Minister and Cabinet
- In office 1 February 1975 – 30 September 1976
- Prime Minister: Gough Whitlam; Malcolm Fraser
- Preceded by: John Bunting
- Succeeded by: Alan Carmody

Secretary of the Department of Immigration and Ethnic Affairs
- In office September 1980 – 25 March 1983
- Preceded by: Lou Engledow
- Succeeded by: Bill McKinnon

Secretary of the Department of the Special Minister of State
- In office 11 March 1983 – 2 March 1984
- Preceded by: Position established
- Succeeded by: Darcy McGaurr

Secretary of the Department of Trade
- In office 1983–1987
- Preceded by: Jim Scully
- Succeeded by: Vince FitzGerald

Personal details
- Born: John Laurence Menadue; 8 February 1935 (age 91) Cowell, South Australia, Australia
- Spouses: Cynthia Trowbridge (m. 1955; died 1984); Susie Bryant (m. 1986; died 2024)
- Children: 4
- Education: Prince Alfred College
- Alma mater: University of Adelaide
- Website: johnmenadue.com

John Laurence Menadue AO (born 8 February 1935) is an Australian businessman and public commentator, and formerly a senior public servant and diplomat. He served as Secretary of the Department of Prime Minister and Cabinet from 1975 to 1976, working under the Whitlam and Fraser governments. He was later appointed by Malcolm Fraser as Australian Ambassador to Japan, in which position he served from 1977 to 1980, after which Menadue returned to Australia and was appointed the Secretary of the Department of Immigration and Ethnic Affairs from 1980 to 1983. Later in 1983, he became the Secretary of the Department of the Special Minister of State and the Secretary of the Department of Trade.

== Biography ==
Menadue was born in the South Australian town of Cowell on 8 February 1935 to a Methodist minister, Laurie G. Menadue, and Elma Florence Menear. His sister, Beth, was two years older than him.

From March 1960 to October 1967 Menadue was private secretary to Gough Whitlam, deputy leader of the Labor Opposition in the federal parliament (Whitlam became leader in February 1967). In 1966 Menadue stood unsuccessfully as Labor candidate for the NSW federal seat of Hume.

== Public service and diplomatic career ==
Menadue headed the Department of Prime Minister and Cabinet from 1974 to 1976, working under prime ministers Gough Whitlam and Malcolm Fraser. He was Australian Ambassador to Japan from 1976 to 1980.

Menadue returned to Australia in 1980 to take up the position of Secretary of the Department of Immigration and Ethnic Affairs. In 1983, he was appointed Secretary of the Department of the Special Minister of State and Department of Trade.

== Business career ==
Menadue worked as General Manager of News Limited from 1967 to 1974.

He was chief executive officer of Qantas from June 1986 to July 1989.

In October 1999, Menadue published his autobiography Things You Learn Along the Way. He was the founding Chair of New Matilda (NewMatilda.com), an independent weekly online newsletter which was launched in August 2004. He is the founder and fellow of public-interest think tank, the Centre for Policy Development. He also publishes the public affairs blogsite Pearls and Irritations.

== Honours ==
Menadue was made an Officer of the Order of Australia (AO) in 1985 for public service. In 2003 he was awarded the Centenary Medal "for service to Australian society through public service leadership". In 1997, he received the Japanese Imperial Award, The Grand Cordon of the Order of the Sacred Treasure (Kun-itto Zuihō-shō), the highest honour awarded to foreigners who are not head of state or head of government.

== Personal ==
Menadue was first married to Cynthia née Trowbridge with whom he had four children and one foster daughter. Cynthia died of cancer in October 1984 aged 49. In 1986, Menadue married Susie, who brought two children to the marriage. Together they have fifteen grandchildren and five great-grandchildren. Susie died in October 2024.

== References and external links ==
- Colvin, Mark (7 October 1999). "John Menadue interview transcript". Radio National.
- John Menadue, University of Western Sydney, archived from the original on 23 August 2006

Government offices
Preceded by Jim Scully	Secretary of the Department of Trade; 1983–1986	Succeeded by Vince FitzGerald
New title Department established	Secretary of the Department of the Special Minister of State; 1983	Succeeded by Darcy McGaurr
Preceded by Lou Engledow	Secretary of the Department of Immigration and Ethnic Affairs; 1980–1983	Succeeded by Bill McKinnon
Preceded by John Bunting	Secretary of the Department of the Prime Minister and Cabinet; 1975–1976	Succeeded by Alan Carmody
Diplomatic posts
Preceded by Mick Shann	Australian Ambassador to Japan; 1977–1980	Succeeded by James Plimsoll
