= Lloyd Bott =

Australian public servant

Lloyd Bott DSC CBE
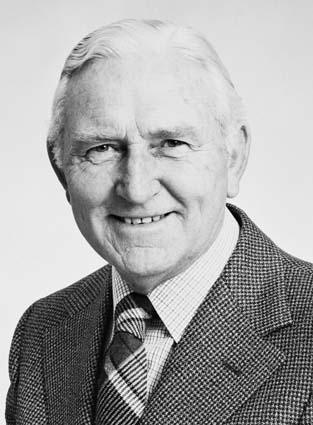
- Bott in 1976

Secretary of the Department of Immigration and Ethnic Affairs
- In office 23 December 1975 – 10 August 1977

Secretary of the Department of Tourism and Recreation
- In office 9 January 1973 – 22 December 1975

Acting Secretary of the Department of Minerals and Energy
- In office 19 December 1972 – 20 December 1972

Secretary of the Department of National Development
- In office 1 October 1969 – 19 December 1972

Personal details
- Born: Lloyd Forrester Bott; 8 April 1917 Thornbury, Melbourne
- Died: 8 September 2004 (aged 87)
- Spouse: Gwendoline Siddons (m. 1940)
- Children: Michael, Susan and Stephen
- Occupation: Public servant

Lloyd Forrester Bott DSC CBE (8 April 1917 – 8 September 2004) was a senior Australian public servant.

== Early life ==
Lloyd Bott was born on 8 April 1917 in Thornbury, Melbourne. He attended Northcote High School.

== Career ==
After leaving high school, Bott qualified for the Commonwealth Public Service in 1933 and went to work in the post office in Sydney. He returned to Melbourne a year later and began to study at the University of Melbourne, Bachelor of Commerce, which he completed in 1948 when he returned from the Second World War, having served in the Australian Navy.

After his time as a "yachtie" based in Dartmouth, Bott joined the Department of Supply, rising to become a Deputy Secretary in the department in 1967. He was responsible for the Administration of United States space projects in Australia during the time of the Apollo 11 Moon landing.

John Gorton appointed Bott Secretary of the Department of National Development in 1969. He was later Secretary of the Department of Tourism and Recreation, between 1973 and 1975.

Bott retired from the public service in 1977, his final appointment being Secretary of the Department of Immigration and Ethnic Affairs, which he had held since December 1975.

== Awards and honours ==
Lloyd Bott was honoured with a Distinguished Service Cross in 1945, for his "gallantry, enthusiasm and great devotion to duty while serving in HM MGB 502 in hazardous operations".

In 2010, a street in the Canberra suburb of Casey was named Bott Crescent in Lloyd Bott's honour.

Government offices
Preceded by Bill Boswell	Secretary of the Department of National Development; 1969 – 1972	Department abolished
New title Department established	Acting Secretary of the Department of Minerals and Energy; 1972	Succeeded by Lenox Hewitt
Preceded by Doug McKay (Acting)	Secretary of the Department of Tourism and Recreation; 1973 - 1975	Department abolished
Preceded by Peter Wilenski as Secretary of the Department of Labor and Immigration	Secretary of the Department of Immigration and Ethnic Affairs; 1975 – 1977	Succeeded by Lou Engledow
