= Department of National Resources =

Australian government department, 1975–1977

Department overview
- Formed: 22 December 1975
- Preceding Department: Department of Minerals and Energy Department of Housing and Construction (I) Department of the Environment (I)
- Dissolved: 20 December 1977
- Superseding Department: Department of Trade and Resources Department of National Development (II)
- Jurisdiction: Commonwealth of Australia
- Minister responsible: Doug Anthony, Minister
- Department executive: Jim Scully, Secretary

The Department of National Resources was an Australian government department that existed between December 1975 and December 1977.

== Scope ==
Information about the department's functions and government funding allocation could be found in the Administrative Arrangements Orders, the annual Portfolio Budget Statements and in the Department's annual reports.

At its creation, the Department's functions were:

- Evaluation and balanced development of mineral, water and energy resources having regard to future requirements
- Geodesy, mapping

== Structure ==
The Department was a Commonwealth Public Service department, staffed by officials who were responsible to the Minister for National Resources, Doug Anthony.
