= 1957 Richmond by-election =

← 1955	14 September 1957	1958 →

The Richmond seat in the House of Representatives
- Turnout: 38,254 (92.3%)
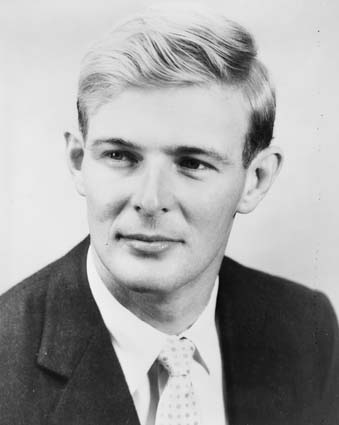

	First party	Second party
Candidate	Doug Anthony	William Smith
Party	National	Labor
Popular vote	18,819	10,276
Percentage	49.8%	27.2%
Swing	▲49.8	▲27.2
MP before election
Larry Anthony Sr.
National
Elected MP
Doug Anthony
National

A by-election was held for the Australian House of Representatives seat of Richmond on 14 September 1957. This was triggered by the sudden death of Country Party MP Larry Anthony.

The by-election was won by Anthony's son Doug, also running for the Country Party, who prevailed over a six-candidate field that included four endorsed Country Party members.

== Results ==
Richmond by-election, 1957
Party	Candidate	Votes	%	±%
Country	Doug Anthony	18,819	49.8	+49.8
Labor	William Smith	10,276	27.2	+27.2
Country	Raymond Gordon	4,678	12.4	+12.4
Country	Oswald Jackson	1,696	4.5	+4.5
Country	Raymond O'Neill	1,241	3.3	+3.3
Independent	Cynthia Wilson	1,057	2.8	+2.8
Total formal votes		37,767	98.7	
Informal votes		487	1.3	
Turnout		38,254	92.3	
Two-party-preferred result
Country	Doug Anthony		69.7	+69.7
Labor	William Smith		30.3	+30.3
Country hold		Swing		
