= Alan Westerman =

Sir Alan Westerman CBE

Secretary of the Department of Trade
- In office 1 September 1960 – 17 December 1963

Secretary of the Department of Trade and Industry
- In office 17 December 1963 – 1 February 1971

Personal details
- Born: 25 March 1913 New Zealand
- Died: 18 May 2001 (aged 88)
- Spouse: Ruth Claremont (d. 1966)
- Education: University of Tasmania; University of Melbourne; Columbia University
- Occupation: Public servant

Sir Wilfred Alan Westerman CBE (25 March 1913 – 18 May 2001) was a senior Australian public servant and policymaker.

== Life and career ==
Alan Westerman was born in New Zealand on 25 March 1913. He was educated at Knox Grammar School, the University of Tasmania, the University of Melbourne and Columbia University.

After World War II, Westerman joined the Australian Trade Commissioner Service, staying in the organisation between 1946 and 1949.

He was appointed Secretary of the Department of Trade in September 1960, becoming Secretary of the Department of Trade and Industry when the new department was established in 1963. His contribution to trade policy occurred at a significant time in Australia's international trading history, as the nation was seeking markets for its ever-increasing industrial products.

Westerman retired from his Secretary role when he was appointed executive chairman of the Australian Industry Development Corporation beginning February 1971.

== Awards and honours ==
Westerman was made a Commander of the Order of the British Empire in 1962. In 1963, he was made a Knight Bachelor.

In 2009, a street in the Canberra suburb of Casey was named Westerman Street in Alan Westerman's honour.

Government offices
Preceded by John Crawford	Secretary of the Department of Trade; 1960 – 1963	Succeeded by Himself as Secretary of the Department of Trade and Industry
Preceded by Himself as Secretary of the Department of Trade	Secretary of the Department of Trade and Industry; 1963 – 1971	Succeeded by Doug McKay
