= Ken Wriedt =

Australian politician (1927–2010)

The Honourable Ken Wriedt
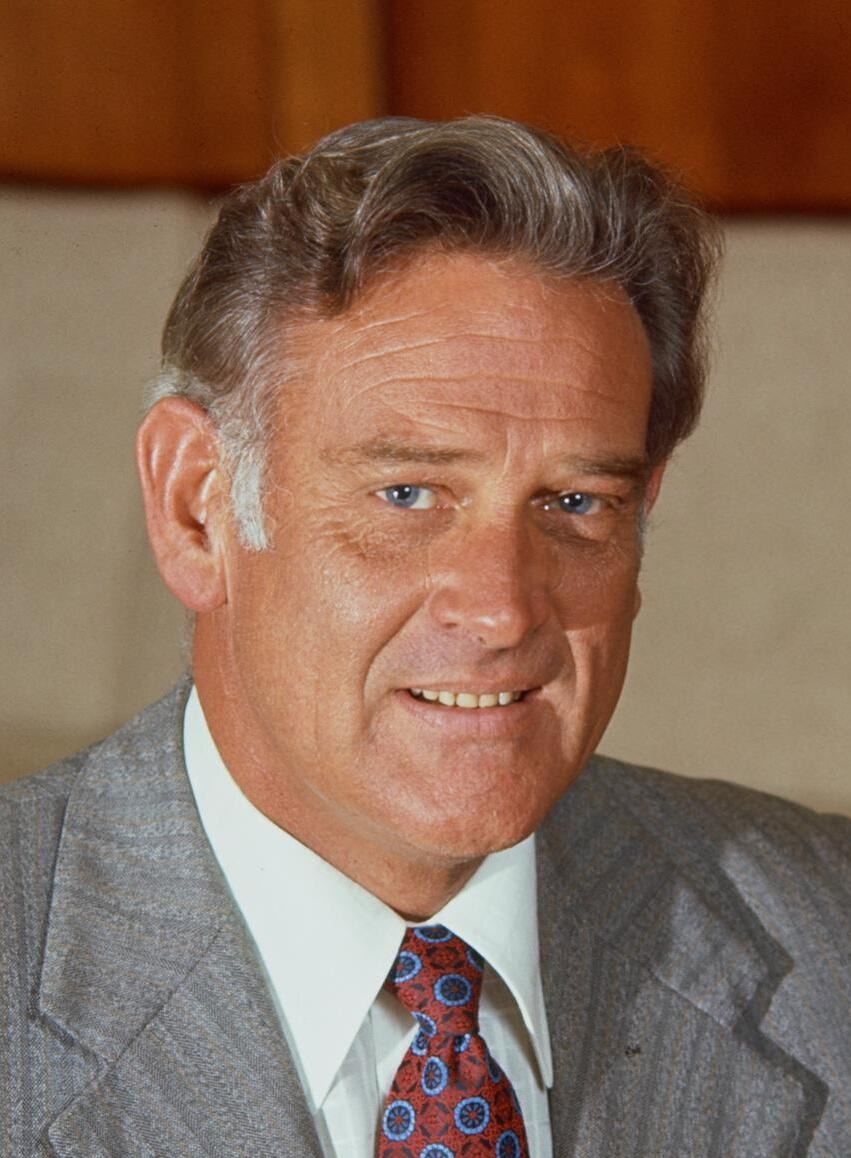
- Wriedt in 1975

Leader of the Opposition in Tasmania
- In office 27 May 1982 – 19 February 1986
- Preceded by: Robin Gray
- Succeeded by: Neil Batt
State Politics
Minister for Roads and Transport
In office 29 June 1989 – October 1990
Preceded by	Nick Evers
Succeeded by	Harry Holgate
Member for Franklin
In office 15 May 1982 – October 1990
Preceded by	Dick Adams
Succeeded by	Paul Lennon

Leader of the Australian Labor Party in the Senate
- In office 10 February 1975 – 28 September 1980
- Leader: Gough Whitlam; Bill Hayden
- Preceded by: Lionel Murphy
- Succeeded by: John Button

Minister for Minerals and Energy
- In office 14 October 1975 – 11 November 1975
- Preceded by: Rex Connor
- Succeeded by: Doug Anthony

Minister for Primary Industry & Agriculture
- In office 19 December 1972 – 21 October 1975
- Preceded by: Lance Barnard
- Succeeded by: Rex Patterson

Senator for Tasmania
- In office 1 July 1968 – 25 September 1980
- Preceded by: Nick McKenna
- Succeeded by: Jean Hearn

Personal details
- Born: 11 July 1927 Fitzroy, Victoria, Australia
- Died: 18 October 2010 (aged 83) Hobart, Tasmania, Australia
- Party: Labor
- Spouse: Helga Burger (m. 1959; died 2010)
- Children: Paula Wriedt
- Occupation: Seaman

Kenneth Shaw Wriedt (11 July 1927 – 18 October 2010) was an Australian politician. He was a member of the Australian Labor Party (ALP) and served as a Senator for Tasmania from 1968 to 1980, including as a minister in the Whitlam government (1972–1975) and ALP Senate leader. He later moved to state politics where he was ALP state leader and leader of the opposition from 1982 to 1986.

== Early life ==
Wriedt was born on 11 July 1927 in Fitzroy, Victoria. He was the youngest of three sons of Etheline Ivy (née Renfrey) and Frederick Wriedt. His father, of Danish descent, was a fitter and turner and "militant" trade unionist, while his Scottish-born mother had worked as a schoolteacher prior to her marriage.

Wriedt attended Westgarth Central School in Northcote and went on to University High School, Melbourne. He left school in 1944 at the age of sixteen to take up a cadetship with the merchant marine. He later became a navigation officer, working on bulk iron ore and phosphate carriers and also in coastal shipping. He was largely self-educated, playing classical music and developing "a lifelong interest in Buddhism". In 1958, Wriedt settled in Hobart, Tasmania, which he regarded as the most beautiful harbour he had seen. He subsequently worked as an insurance inspector.

== Early political involvement ==
Wriedt joined the ALP in 1959. He was an unsuccessful candidate for federal preselection in Franklin in 1963 and 1965, and an unsuccessful candidate at the 1964 state election. He was an opponent of Australian involvement in the Vietnam War and was state director of Community Aid Abroad in 1965.

== Federal politics ==
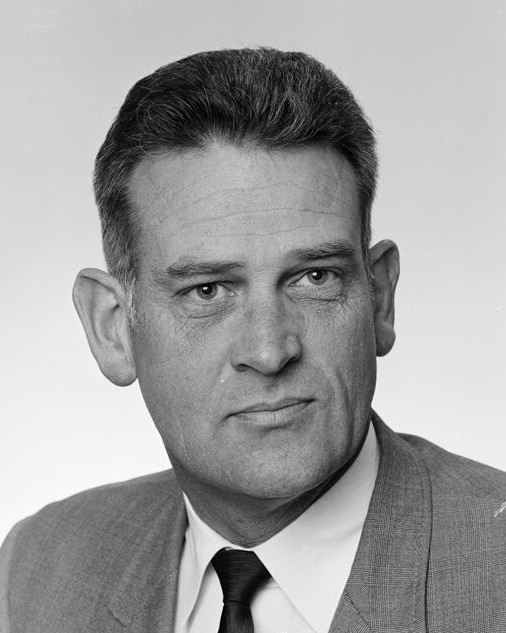
Wriedt in 1971

Wriedt was elected to parliament at the 1967 Senate election, to a six-year term beginning on 1 July 1968. He was re-elected at the 1974 and 1975 elections, which followed double dissolutions.

=== Whitlam government ===
Following the ALP's victory at the 1972 election, Wriedt was elected to cabinet and appointed Minister for Primary Industry by Prime Minister Gough Whitlam, a portfolio with which he had no previous association. In 1974 his department was abolished as part of a departmental restructure and renamed the Department of Agriculture. Wriedt oversaw the introduction of a floor price for export wool, the removal of federal subsidies for butter, and an emphasis on diversification and the expansion of markets in Asia and the Middle East. The government's decision to remove the superphosphate bounty in 1974 – which Whitlam supported but Wriedt opposed – proved unpopular with farmers.

In February 1975, Wriedt was elected to replace Lionel Murphy as his party's Senate leader and Leader of the Government in the Senate. His status in the party had risen through his role in responding to ministerial questions in the Senate, including as representative of the Treasurer where he responded to questions around Rex Connor and the Loans Affair. In October 1975 he was appointed to replace Connor as Minister for Minerals Energy. As Senate leader, Wriedt was closely involved in the 1975 constitutional crisis, where the ALP lost its Senate majority and the opposition chose to block supply. He was not immediately made aware of Whitlam's dismissal on 11 November 1975 and inadvertently allowed the new Fraser government to pass supply, thereby meeting one of Governor-General John Kerr's conditions for the granting of a double dissolution. The ALP failed to regain government at the resulting election.

=== Opposition ===
Wriedt became "increasingly disenchanted with Whitlam" and supported Frank Crean's unsuccessful candidacy in the 1976 ALP leadership spill. He was nonetheless re-elected as Senate leader over Whitlam's preferred candidate, Jim McClelland, and acted as leader of the opposition in mid-1976 when both Whitlam and his deputy Tom Uren were overseas. Clyde Cameron later recalled that Wriedt was ambitious to transfer to the House of Representatives and sought to build up a public profile to replace Whitlam as leader.

In Whitlam's shadow cabinet, Wriedt served briefly as spokesman on minerals and energy and then as spokesman on education (1976–1977). After Bill Hayden won the 1977 leadership election he was made spokesman on foreign affairs, his preferred portfolio. In June 1979, Wriedt announced that he would resign from the Senate and contest the House of Representatives seat of Denison at the 1980 election, seeking to defeat incumbent Liberal government minister Michael Hodgman. He failed to defeat Hodgman despite a small swing to Labor.

== State politics ==
At the 1982 Tasmanian state election, Wriedt won a seat in the Tasmanian House of Assembly representing Franklin. He was Leader of the Opposition from 1982 to 1986. At the 1986 state election, Wriedt was unable to defeat the incumbent Liberal government of Robin Gray; Labor actually suffered a small swing. He resigned as leader after the election, the first state Labor leader in more than half a century to have never served as Premier of Tasmania. He was a minister from 1989 to 1990 in the minority government led by Michael Field. In October 1990 he retired from parliament.

== Personal life ==
In 1959, Wriedt married Helga Burger, a German immigrant. They had two daughters, including Paula Wriedt who was also a Tasmanian state MP.

Wriedt died of Parkinson's disease on 18 October 2010, aged 83, a month after the death of his wife.

Political offices
Preceded by Ian Sinclair	Minister for Primary Industry (Agriculture); 1972–75	Succeeded by Rex Patterson
Preceded by Rex Connor	Minister for Minerals and Energy; 1975	Succeeded by Doug Anthony
Preceded by Robin Gray	Leader of the Opposition in Tasmania; 1982–86	Succeeded by Neil Batt
Party political offices
Preceded by Lionel Murphy	Leader of the Australian Labor Party in the Senate; 1975–80	Succeeded by John Button
Preceded by Harry Holgate	Leader of the Labor Party in Tasmania; 1982–86	Succeeded by Neil Batt
