= Department of Trade (1983–1987) =

Australian government department, 1983–1987

Department overview
- Formed: 11 March 1983
- Preceding Department: Department of Trade and Resources
- Dissolved: 24 July 1987
- Superseding Department: Department of Primary Industries and Energy - for sugar legislation and commodity marketing/administration functions Department of Foreign Affairs and Trade - for functions of trade agreements, bilateral and multilateral trade policy and international trade and commodity negotiations along with the New Zealand Preferential Customs Tariff Act and the Trade Representatives Act 1933 Department of Industry, Technology and Commerce - for export services/promotion function; export expansion and market development
- Jurisdiction: Commonwealth of Australia
- Headquarters: Barton, Canberra
- Ministers responsible: Lionel Bowen, Minister (1983‑84); John Dawkins, Minister (1984‑87)
- Department executives: Jim Scully, Secretary (1983‑84); John Menadue, Secretary (1983‑86); Vince FitzGerald, Secretary (1986‑87)

The Department of Trade was an Australian government department that existed between March 1983 and July 1987. It was the second so-named Australian government department.

== History ==
The department was dissolved in July 1987 as part of a large overhaul of the Public Service that reduced the number of departments from 28 to 17.

== Scope ==
Information about the department's functions and government funding allocation could be found in the Administrative Arrangements Orders, the annual Portfolio Budget Statements and in the department's annual reports.

At the department's creation it was responsible for:

- Trade and Commerce with other countries in particular-
  - Bilateral and Multilateral trade policy.
  - Trade promotion and services.
  - Trade agreements.
  - Export services.

== Structure ==
The department was a Commonwealth Public Service department, staffed by officials who were responsible to the Minister for Trade.
