= Centre for Policy Development =

Australian think tank

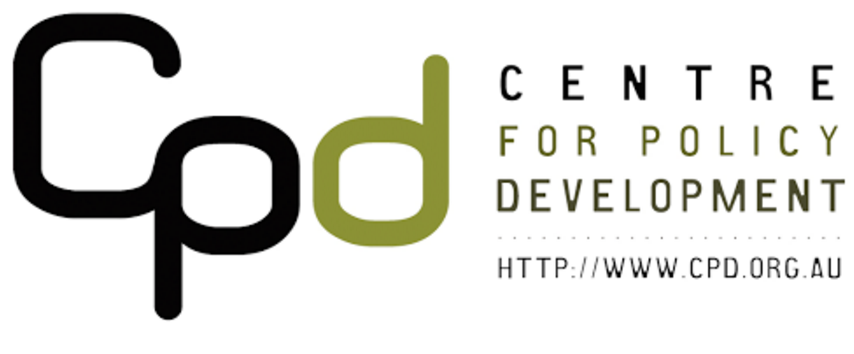
- Founder: John Menadue and Miriam Lyons
- Headquarters: Sydney and Melbourne, Australia
- Region served: Australia and the Indo-Pacific region
- Chair: Zoe Whitton
- CEO: Andrew Hudson
- Website: cpd.org.au

Centre for Policy Development (CPD) is a public policy think tank in Australia.

== History ==
John Menadue AO was the founding chair of the organisation. He had served as Secretary of Prime Minister and Cabinet for prime ministers Gough Whitlam and Malcolm Fraser, among other roles.

== Description ==
The Centre for Policy Development focuses on informing public policy in Australia and the Indo-Pacific region. Its programs cover such topics as climate change, energy transition, child detention, refugee settlement with regard to the economy, and early childhood education.

== Governance ==
As of April 2024, Sam Mostyn (Governor General) stepped down as chair, and Don Russell became acting chair. In September 2024, Zoe Whitton became chair of CPD. Andrew Hudson is CEO.

== Impact ==
The research, recommendations and views of the CPD are frequently cited in the media.

== Research fellows ==
The following are former research fellows who resigned in 2015 over concerns that CPD was moving to a more centre-right position.

- Mark Bahnisch
- Eva Cox
- John Quiggin
- Steve Keen
- Ben Spies-Butcher
- James Whelan
