= Lou Engledow =

Australian public servant

Lou Engledow CBE

Secretary of the Department of the Capital Territory
- In office 9 January 1973 – 19 August 1977

Secretary of the Department of Immigration and Ethnic Affairs
- In office 10 August 1977 – 25 July 1980

Personal details
- Born: Louis William Bircham Engledow
- Children: John, Steve and Sarah
- Occupation: Public servant

Louis William Bircham "Lou" Engledow CBE is a retired senior Australian public servant, best known for his time as Secretary of the Department of Immigration and Ethnic Affairs between August 1977 and July 1980, and for his contribution to the development of Canberra in various official roles.

== Life and career ==
Between 1973 and 1977, Engledow was Secretary of the Department of the Capital Territory. Before being appointed to the role, he was City Manager in the Department of the Interior, and had also worked in the National Capital Development Commission. As City Manager, he was responsible for daily administrative activities for Canberra and the ACT, including Jervis Bay; these activities included street collections, rates, building plans, consumer protection, bus services and welfare.

In August 1977, Engledow was appointed permanent head of the Department of Immigration and Ethnic Affairs. His appointment lasted until July 1980, when he retired from the public service.

== Awards ==
In the 1978 Queen's Birthday Honours, Engledow was made a Commander of the Order of the British Empire, in recognition of his service to the Australian Public Service.

Government offices
Preceded by George Warwick Smith	Secretary of the Department of the Capital Territory; 1973 – 1977	Succeeded by Laurie Daniels
Preceded by Lloyd Bott	Secretary of the Department of Immigration and Ethnic Affairs; 1977 – 1980	Succeeded by John Menadue
