= Department of Trade (1956–1963) =

Australian government department, 1956–1963

Department overview
- Formed: 11 January 1956
- Preceding Department: Department of National Development (I) – for industrial development Department of Commerce and Agriculture – for trade promotion, policy treaties, investigations Department of Trade and Customs – for tariff policy, trade agreements, import licensing policy
- Dissolved: 17 December 1963
- Superseding Department: Department of Trade and Industry
- Jurisdiction: Commonwealth of Australia
- Headquarters: Barton, Canberra
- Minister responsible: John McEwen, Minister
- Department executives: John Crawford, Secretary (1956–1960); Alan Westerman, Secretary (1960–1963)

The Department of Trade was an Australian government department that existed between January 1956 and December 1963.

== History ==
The department was created as part of a reshuffle of the seventh Menzies ministry following the Coalition's re-election at the 1955 federal election. Its creation "had the effect of stripping a number of departments of overseas trade-related responsibilities and concentrating them all in the new department". The new department took on the majority of responsibilities of the existing Department of Trade and Customs, with its customs functions split into the new Department of Customs and Excise which had a largely administrative function. At the same time the former Department of Commerce and Agriculture had its agricultural functions split off into the new Department of Primary Industry, with export policy and overseas marketing of rural commodities lying within the new Department of Trade. The new department also took over overseas shipping policy from the Department of Shipping and Transport.

The new department was created by Prime Minister Robert Menzies at the behest of Country Party deputy leader John McEwen, who was previously Minister for Commerce and Agriculture. Given Australia's reliance on overseas trade, the department came to exercise significant influence on economic policy, coming to rival the Department of the Treasury. Additionally, other ministers whose departments touched on overseas trade were expected to consult with McEwen on policy matters.

== Scope ==
Information about the department's functions and government funding allocation could be found in the Administrative Arrangements Orders, the annual Portfolio Budget Statements and in the department's annual reports.

At the department's creation it was responsible for:

- trade promotion and trade policy, including the Trade Commissioner Service, the trade publicity branch and published Overseas Trading
- trade treaties and arrangements
- trade investigations
- tariff policy
- Tariff Board
- trade agreements
- import licensing policy
- industrial development

== Structure ==
The department was a Commonwealth Public Service department, staffed by officials who were responsible to the Minister for Trade, John McEwen.
