= Doug Anthony =

Deputy Prime Minister of Australia (1929–2020)

The Right Honourable Doug Anthony AC CH FTSE PC
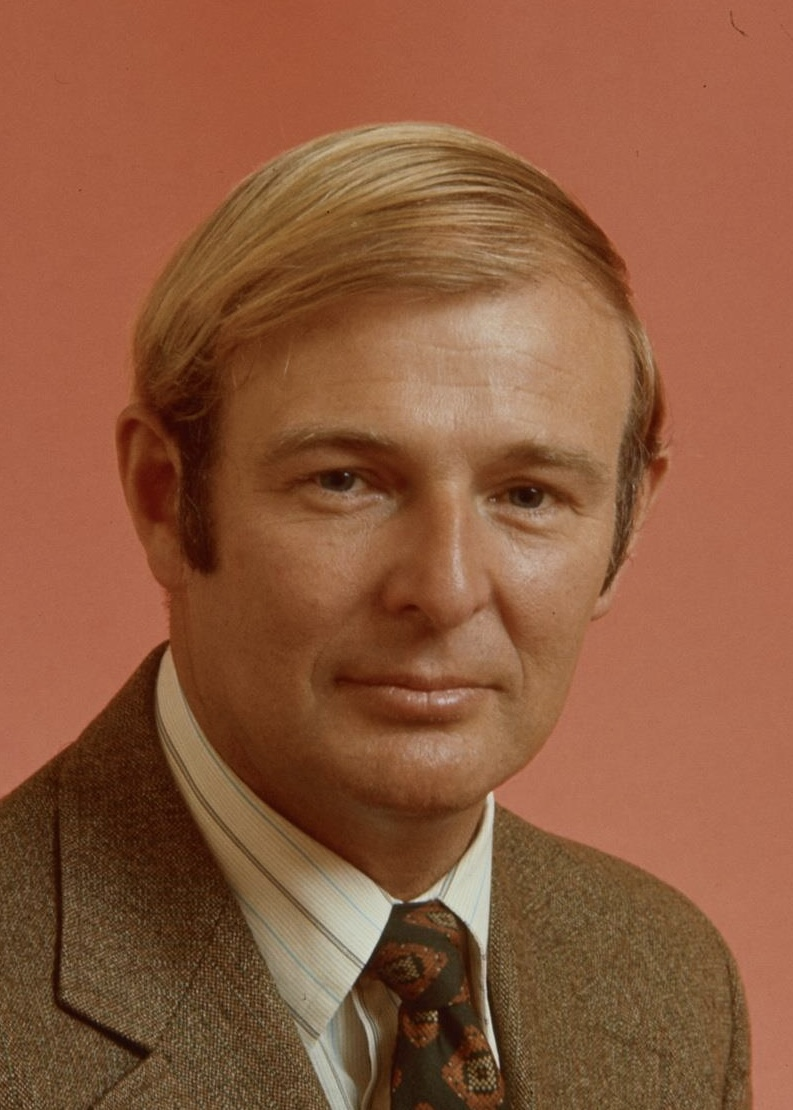
- Official portrait, 1974

Deputy Prime Minister of Australia
- In office 12 November 1975 – 11 March 1983
- Prime Minister: Malcolm Fraser
- Preceded by: Frank Crean
- Succeeded by: Lionel Bowen
- In office 5 February 1971 – 5 December 1972
- Prime Minister: John Gorton; William McMahon
- Preceded by: John McEwen
- Succeeded by: Lance Barnard

Leader of the National Party (Note: Known as the National Country Party from 1975 to 1982 and the Country Party before 1975.)
- In office 2 February 1971 – 17 January 1984
- Deputy: Ian Sinclair
- Preceded by: John McEwen
- Succeeded by: Ian Sinclair

Deputy Leader of the Country Party
- In office 8 December 1966 – 2 February 1971
- Leader: John McEwen
- Preceded by: Charles Adermann
- Succeeded by: Ian Sinclair
Cabinet Posts
Minister for Trade and Resources
In office 20 December 1977 – 11 March 1983
Preceded by	Himself (as Minister for National Resources and Minister for Overseas Trade)
Succeeded by	Lionel Bowen
Minister for National Resources
In office 22 December 1975 – 20 December 1977
Preceded by	New department
Succeeded by	Himself (as Minister for Trade and Resources)
Minister for Overseas Trade
In office 11 November 1975 – 20 December 1977
Preceded by	Frank Crean
Succeeded by	Himself (as Minister for Trade and Resources)
Minister for Trade and Industry
In office 5 February 1971 – 5 December 1972
Preceded by	John McEwen
Succeeded by	Gough Whitlam
Minister for Primary Industry
In office 16 October 1967 – 5 February 1971
Preceded by	Charles Adermann
Succeeded by	Ian Sinclair
Minister for the Interior
In office 4 March 1964 – 16 October 1967
Preceded by	John Gorton
Succeeded by	Peter Nixon

Father of the House
- In office 16 August 1983 – 18 January 1984
- Preceded by: James Killen
- Succeeded by: Tom Uren

Member of the Australian Parliament for Richmond
- In office 14 September 1957 – 18 January 1984
- Preceded by: Larry Anthony
- Succeeded by: Charles Blunt

Personal details
- Born: John Douglas Anthony; 31 December 1929 Murwillumbah, New South Wales, Australia
- Died: 20 December 2020 (aged 90) Murwillumbah, New South Wales, Australia
- Party: Country Party/NCP/National Party
- Spouse: Margot Budd (m. 1957)
- Children: Larry Anthony
- Parent(s): Larry Anthony, Sr. and Jessie Anthony (née Stirling)

John Douglas Anthony (31 December 1929 – 20 December 2020) was an Australian politician. He served as leader of the National Party of Australia from 1971 to 1984 and was the second and longest-serving deputy prime minister, holding the position under John Gorton (1971), William McMahon (1971–1972) and Malcolm Fraser (1975–1983).

Anthony was born in Murwillumbah, New South Wales, the son of federal government minister Hubert Lawrence Anthony. He was elected to the House of Representatives at a 1957 by-election, aged 27, following his father's sudden death. He was appointed to the ministry in 1964 and in Coalition governments over the following 20 years held the portfolios of Minister for the Interior (1964–1967), Primary Industry (1967–1971), Trade and Industry (1971–1972), Overseas Trade (1975–1977), National Resources (1975–1977), and Trade and Resources (1977–1983). Anthony was elected deputy leader of the Country Party in 1964 and succeeded John McEwen as party leader and deputy prime minister in 1971. He retired from politics at the 1984 election. His son Larry Anthony became the third generation of his family to enter federal parliament.

== Early life ==
Anthony was born in Murwillumbah in northern New South Wales, on 31 December 1929, the son of Jessie Anthony (née Stirling) and Hubert Lawrence ("Larry") Anthony, a well-known Country Party politician. Doug Anthony was educated at Murwillumbah Primary School and Murwillumbah High School, before attending The King's School in Sydney (1943–1946) and then Gatton College in Queensland. After graduating he took up dairy farming near Murwillumbah. In 1957 he married Margot Budd, with whom he had three children: Dougald, Jane and Larry.

== Political career ==
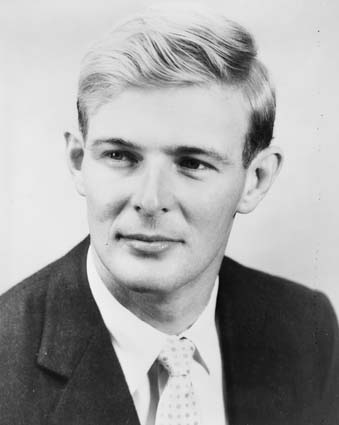
Anthony shortly after his election, in 1958

=== Early career (1957–1964) ===
In 1957 Larry Anthony Sr., who was Postmaster-General in the Liberal–Country Party coalition government led by Robert Menzies, died suddenly, and Doug Anthony was elected to succeed his father in the ensuing by-election for the Division of Richmond, aged 27. He was appointed Minister for the Interior in 1964 by Menzies in a reshuffle, replacing Senator John Gorton.

=== Minister for the Interior (1964–1967) ===
During his tenure in the Interior portfolio, there were several pushes for Canberra to become independent and self-governing in some capacity. The Menzies government had not yet established a clear policy for Canberra's future, and Anthony stated that the city was not yet ready for self-governance. At Narrogin in August 1966, Anthony relayed to several rural communities that drought would probably soon sweep the region, and that he was prepared to take precautions to prevent as many negative effects as possible. He was unable to comment on protests that took place outside the Canberra Hotel on 2 February 1967.

Anthony was one of the leading forces against the 1967 nexus referendum, which was seeking to increase the Senate's power in parliament. Senator Vince Gair revived the debate around the introduction of such a law in early 1967. Anthony and the County Party decided it would be “unwise” to increase the power of the upper house.

Towards the end of his term as Minister for the Interior, Anthony supported a federal redistribution with conditions so restrictive that it favoured country seats and would increase Country Party representation. Splits within the Liberal and Country coalition were causing such issues to be raised and considered by parliament. These tensions were also fuelled by the narrow majority with which the Liberal Party was returned to power in the 1963 election; without Country Party support they could not have guaranteed parliamentary supply. In 1967, he became Minister for Primary Industry.

=== Minister for Primary Industry (1967–1971) ===
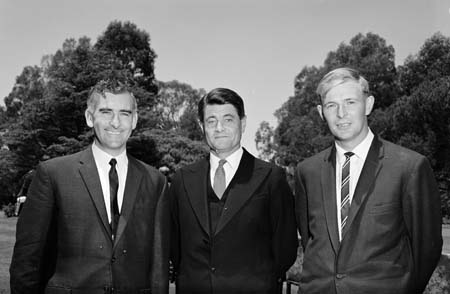
Anthony with Billy Snedden and Jim Forbes in 1963

His first speech in this portfolio was made regarding the wheat price in Australia. 1966–67 had yielded a smaller amount than the 1965–66 season, and accordingly the price of wheat had to be raised. Controversially, in May 1968, Anthony initiated a payout of $21 million to offset the devaluation of the British Pound by Prime Minister Harold Wilson; the currencies were not yet independent of each other. Anthony's popularity in the Industry portfolio was damaged when rural production was down $450 million in 1968 and little change had occurred in the return that farmers were getting for production. Anthony worked with Prime Minister John Gorton to try to create as many economically viable options as possible to deal with the “wheat crisis”. Eventually quotas were introduced to limit production. When China stopped importing Australian wheat in 1971, Anthony advised against communication with the country, saying it could be “politically and commercially dangerous".

=== Deputy Prime Minister (1971–1972) ===
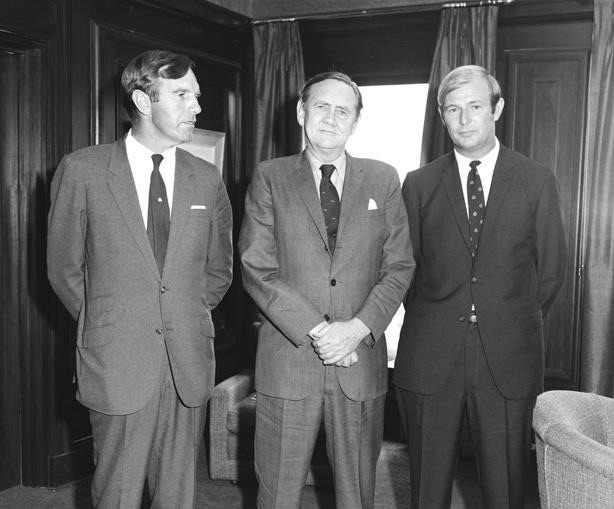
Anthony with John Gorton and Ian Sinclair on 2 February 1971.

By mid-1969, it was thought that John McEwen, leader of the Country Party since 1958, was going to retire sometime in late 1970. The three members of the party considered to have the greatest chance of succeeding McEwen as leader were Anthony, Shipping Minister Ian Sinclair and Interior Minister Peter Nixon. When McEwen retired in 1971, Anthony was chosen as his successor, taking McEwen's old posts of Minister for Trade and Industry and Deputy Prime Minister in the government of John Gorton, portfolios he retained under William McMahon. Anthony was made a member of the Privy Council of the United Kingdom by Queen Elizabeth II on 23 June 1971.

When McMahon became Prime Minister in March 1971, only a month after Anthony had taken the Deputy Prime Minister position, Anthony lost power as McMahon disliked him and the two had a poor working relationship. Anthony opposed the revaluation of the Australian dollar by McMahon in 1971–72. In mid-1972, McMahon stopped talking to Anthony and he was oblivious to many decisions that were occurring outside cabinet. When McMahon announced the 1972 election, he left Anthony in the dark and he was unaware of the date on which it would take place and the campaign techniques the coalition would use. Anthony called the Prime Minister of New Zealand, Jack Marshall, to find out the date, as McMahon had only informed three people of the date before approaching the Governor-General of Australia. Anthony lost faith in the government and became complacent about the defeat which became obvious in the lead up to the election in December 1972.

=== Opposition (1972–1975) ===
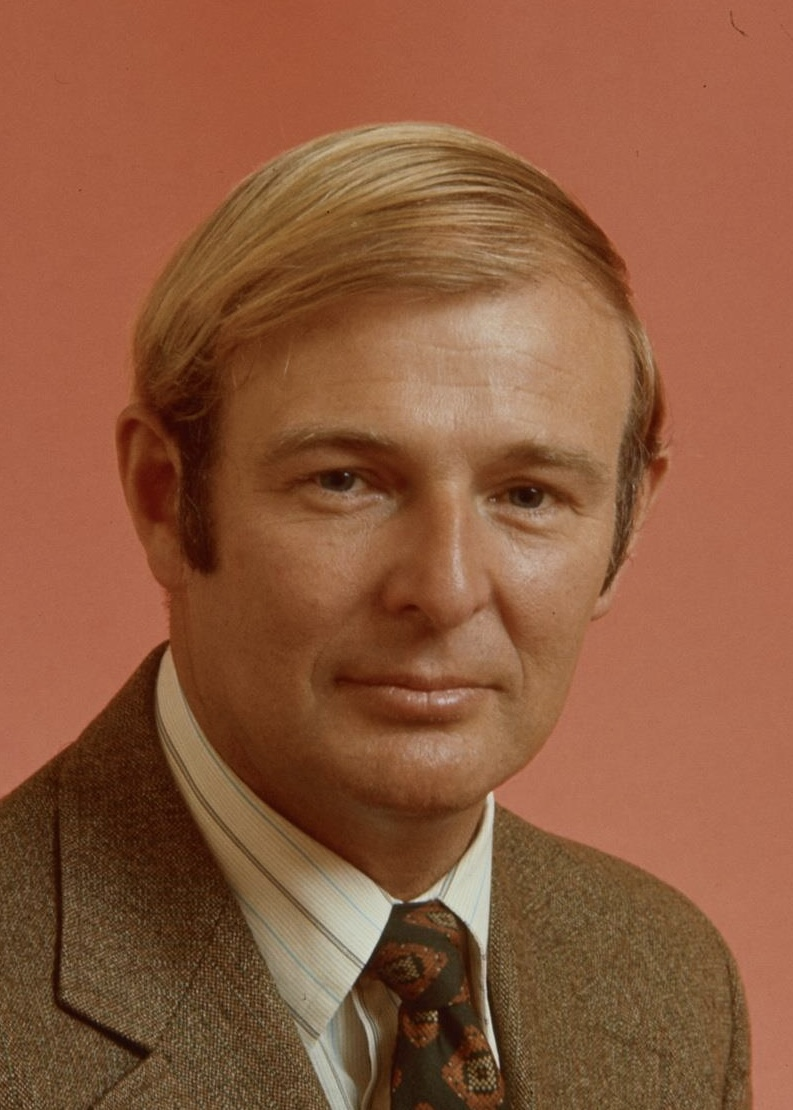
Anthony in 1974.

After McMahon's defeat in 1972, Anthony was said to favour a policy of absolute opposition to the Labor government of Gough Whitlam. Despite that, the Country Party voted with the Labor government on some bills, for example the 1973 expansion of state aid to under-privileged schools. Under Anthony's leadership, the party's name was changed to the National Country Party and it began contesting urban seats in Queensland and Western Australia. There was also a weakening in the party's relationship with primary producer organisations. In 1975, Anthony, along with other senior Opposition members, criticised Whitlam for not giving enough aid to Papua New Guinea.

=== Deputy Prime Minister (1975–1983) ===
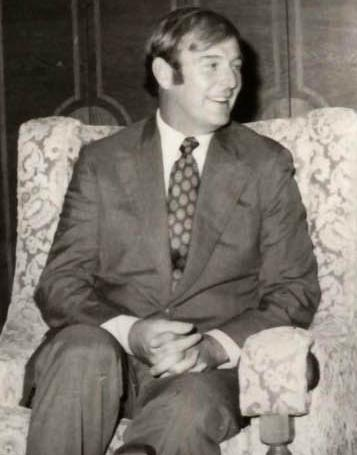
Anthony in Romania in 1976

Anthony had a much better working relationship with Malcolm Fraser than he did with Billy Snedden. At first, Anthony did not support Snedden's or Fraser's decisions to block parliamentary supply from the Labor Party, beginning in October 1975, though he was soon convinced otherwise. The Coalition was confirmed in power at the 1975 election, with the biggest majority government in Australian history. Though from 1975 to 1980 the Liberals won enough seats to form government in their own right, Fraser opted to retain the Coalition with the NCP. Anthony again became Deputy Prime Minister, with the portfolios of Overseas Trade and National Resources (Trade and Resources from 1977). Anthony was noted, while Prime Minister Fraser took annual Christmas holidays, for governing the country as Acting Prime Minister from a caravan in his electorate of Richmond.

In 1976, during his second term as Deputy Prime Minister, Anthony began a strong import and export relationship with Japan, particularly over oil. Anthony supported the mining and export of Australian uranium, and believed it would be an essential part of the future economy. While Acting Prime Minister in July 1976, he was the first user of the Papua New Guinea–Cairns telephone line, speaking to Acting Prime Minister Sir Maori Kiki. While Acting Prime Minister in July 1979, he threatened to shut down an industrial strike in Western Australia, stating the issue had to be resolved. The Labor Party was strongly opposed to this action and called his power as Acting Prime Minister into question. After Fraser lost office in 1983, Anthony remained as party leader (since 1974 named the National Party). The last major move as leader of the National Party that Anthony made was to explain the tensions between the Liberal and National parties in Queensland, who officially opposed each other in the October 1983 election.

== Retirement and death ==
Anthony remained in parliament for less than a year after the 1983 defeat before retiring from politics in 1984. By then, although only 54, he was the Father of the House of Representatives, having served 27 years in Parliament. He returned to his farm near Murwillumbah and generally stayed out of politics. In 1996, Larry Anthony won his father's old seat.

In 1994, Anthony appeared in a documentary series about the Liberal Party in which he revealed that McMahon had refused to tell him beforehand the date of the 1972 election, despite Anthony being the Country Party leader. During 1999, Anthony spoke in support of Australia becoming a republic.

Anthony died at an aged care home in Murwillumbah, on 20 December 2020, at the age of 90. Until his death, he was the earliest-elected Country Party MP still alive, and along with his deputy and successor as National Party leader, Ian Sinclair, he was one of the last two surviving ministers who served in the Menzies Government and the First Holt Ministry.

== Honours ==
In 1981, Anthony was appointed a Member of the Order of the Companions of Honour (CH). In 1990, he was awarded the New Zealand 1990 Commemoration Medal. In 2003 he was made a Companion of the Order of Australia (AC) for service to the Australian Parliament, for forging the development of bi-lateral trade agreements, and for continued leadership and dedication to the social, educational, health and development needs of rural and regional communities.

== See also ==
- Anthony family
- Doug Anthony All Stars

== Explanatory notes ==
Parliament of Australia
Preceded by Hubert Lawrence Anthony	Member for Richmond; 1957–1984	Succeeded by Charles Blunt
Political offices
Preceded by John Gorton	Minister for the Interior; 1964–1967	Succeeded by Peter Nixon
Preceded by Charles Adermann	Minister for Primary Industry; 1967–1971	Succeeded by Ian Sinclair
Preceded by John McEwen	Deputy Prime Minister of Australia; 1971–1972	Succeeded by Lance Barnard
Preceded by Gough Whitlam	Minister for Trade and Industry; 1971–1972	Succeeded by Jim Cairns
Preceded by Frank Crean	Deputy Prime Minister of Australia; 1975–1983	Succeeded by Lionel Bowen
Preceded by Frank Crean	Minister for Overseas Trade/ Minister for Trade and Resources; 1975–1983	Succeeded by Lionel Bowen
Preceded by Ken Wriedt	Minister for National Resources; 1975–1977	Merged into Trade and Resources portfolio
Party political offices
Preceded by Charles Adermann	Deputy Leader of the Country Party of Australia; 1966–1971	Succeeded by Ian Sinclair
Preceded by John McEwen	Leader of the Country/National Country/National Party of Australia; 1971–1984	Succeeded by Ian Sinclair
Honorary titles
Preceded by Sir James Killen	Father of the House of Representatives; 1983–1984	Succeeded by Tom Uren
