= Dave Engledow =

American photographer

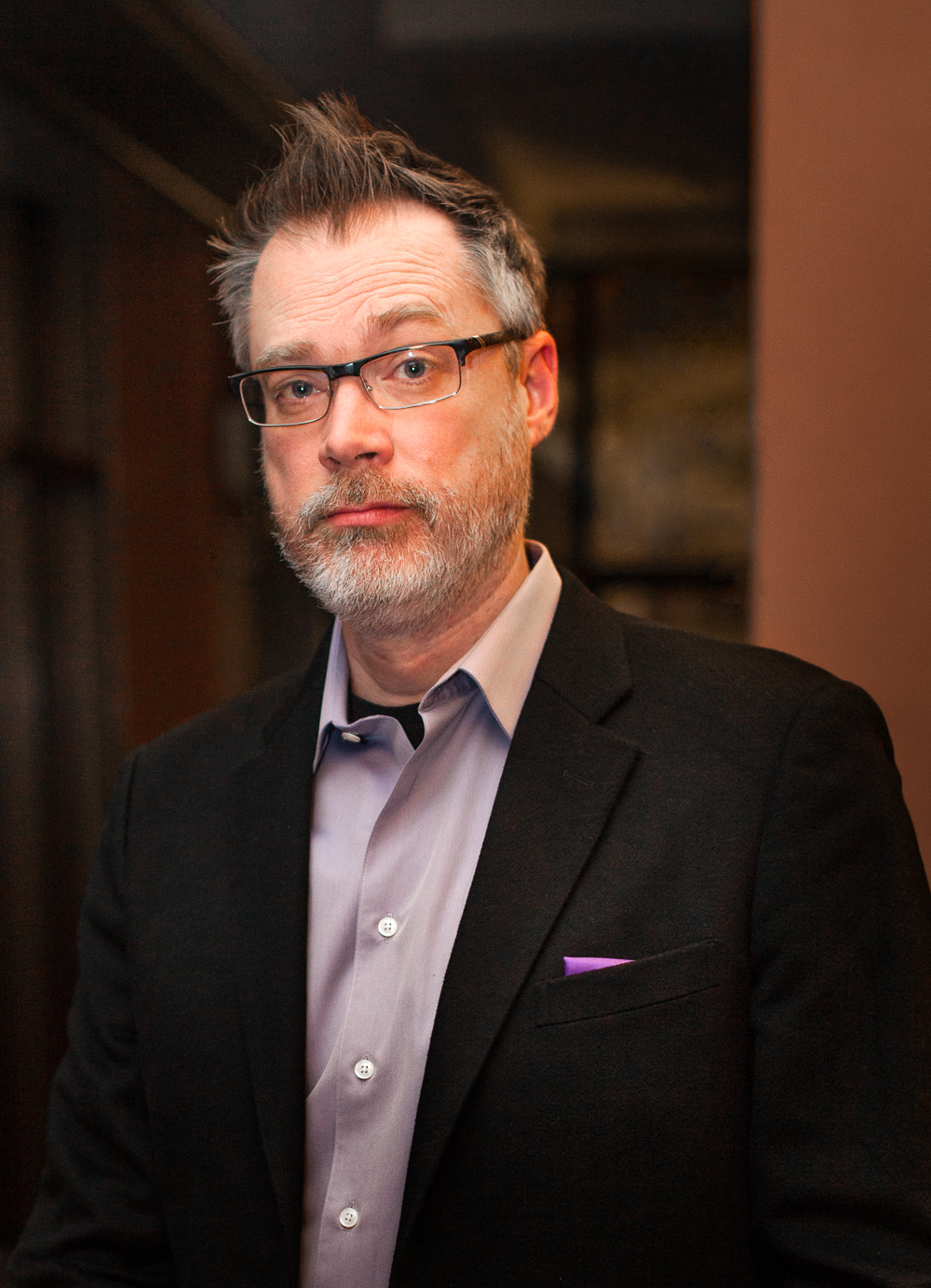
- Occupation: Photographer
- Known for: World's Best Father photographic series

Dave Engledow is an American photographer who is known for his humorous images of himself and his daughter, Alice Bee. His images went viral on the Internet making the pair Internet famous.

== World's Best Father ==
The first image in the series was created just a few weeks after Alice was born. In the image, he is seen holding Alice like a football while he is squirting breast milk into his coffee from Alice's baby bottle. In May 2014, he published a collection of the images in a book titled, Confessions of the World's Best Father. The title of the series, "World's Best Father" comes from a coffee mug with that phrase printed on it appearing somewhere in each of the images in the series. In addition to the book, he has also released calendars of his images.
