= Department of Trade and Resources =

Australian government department

Department overview
- Formed: 20 December 1977
- Preceding Department: Department of Overseas Trade – for trade and commerce with other countries Department of National Resources – for commercial development and marketing of minerals
- Dissolved: 11 March 1983
- Superseding Department: Department of Resources and Energy – for commercial development, marketing and export of minerals, including uranium and hydro-carbon fuels Department of Trade (II)
- Jurisdiction: Commonwealth of Australia
- Headquarters: Australian Capital Territory
- Minister responsible: Doug Anthony, Minister for Trade and Resources
- Department executive: Jim Scully, Secretary

The Department of Trade and Resources was an Australian government department that existed between December 1977 and March 1983.

== Scope ==
Information about the department's functions and government funding allocation could be found in the Administrative Arrangements Orders, the annual Portfolio Budget Statements and in the Department's annual reports.

At its creation, the Department was responsible for the following:

- Trade and commerce with other countries including
  - Trade promotion, including the publication of Overseas Trading
  - Trade agreements
  - Export services
- Commercial development and marketing of minerals (including uranium) and hydrocarbon fuels

== Structure ==
The Department was a Commonwealth Public Service department, staffed by officials who were responsible to the Minister for National Trade and Resources, Doug Anthony. The Secretary of the Department was J. Sully.
