= Department of the Special Minister of State (1983–1987) =

Australian government department, 1983–1987

Department overview
- Formed: 11 March 1983
- Preceding Department: Department of Administrative Services (II)
- Dissolved: 24 July 1987
- Superseding Department: Department of Industrial Relations (II) - for the Judicial and Statutory Officers Remuneration and Allowances Act, 1984 Department of Administrative Services (III) - for honours and symbols policy, parliamentary facilities, support for Royal Commissions, the Electoral Act and the Grants Commission Department of Industry, Technology and Commerce - for elements of the Customs Act 1901 Attorney-General's Department - for law enforcement function
- Jurisdiction: Commonwealth of Australia
- Ministers responsible: Mick Young, Minister (1983 and 1984‑87); Kim Beazley, Minister (1983‑84)
- Department executives: John Menadue, Secretary (1983‑84); Darcy McGaurr, Secretary (1984‑87)

The Department of the Special Minister of State was an Australian government department that existed between March 1983 and July 1987. It was the second so-named Australian government department.

== History ==
The Department was one of three new Departments established by the Hawke government in March 1983, to ensure the priorities of the Labor government could be given effect to readily following the federal election of that month.

The Department was dissolved in July 1987 as part of a large overhaul of the Public Service that reduced the number of departments from 28 to 17. Its functions were dispersed between several departments, and the department's Secretary, Darcy McGaurr, was appointed an Associate Secretary in the Department of Primary Industries and Energy.

== Scope ==
Information about the department's functions and government funding allocation could be found in the Administrative Arrangements Orders, the annual Portfolio Budget Statements and in the Department's annual reports.

The functions of the Department at its creation were:

- Provision of facilities for members of the Parliament other than in Parliament House
- Information Co-ordination
- Police Affairs
- Co-ordination of protective services

== Structure ==
The Department was a Commonwealth Public Service department, staffed by officials who were responsible to the Special Minister of State.
