= Department of Trade and Industry (Australia) =

Australian government department, 1963–1972

Department overview
- Formed: 17 December 1963
- Preceding Department: Department of Trade (I)
- Dissolved: 19 December 1972
- Superseding Department: Department of Tourism and Recreation – for tourism Department of Overseas Trade Department of Secondary Industry – for the Office of Secondary Industry Department of Transport (III) Department of the Prime Minister and Cabinet – for the Tariff Board
- Jurisdiction: Commonwealth of Australia
- Headquarters: Canberra
- Ministers responsible: John McEwen, Minister (1963–1971); Doug Anthony, Minister (1971–1972); Gough Whitlam, Minister (December 1972)
- Department executives: Alan Westerman, Secretary (1963–1971); Doug McKay, Secretary (1971–1972)

The Department of Trade and Industry was an Australian government department that existed between December 1963 and December 1972.

== Scope ==
Information about the department's functions and government funding allocation could be found in the Administrative Arrangements Orders, the annual Portfolio Budget Statements and in the Department's annual reports.

The 1964 Government Directory, reproduced by the National Archives of Australia, stated that the Department dealt with:

- Trade and Commerce with other countries
- Activities arising from the international trade policies of Australia and other countries. Particular aspects covered include the General Agreement on Tariffs and Trade, quantitative restrictions, subsidies, restrictive business and customs practice, exchange arrangements, export incentives and overseas shipping policies;
- Negotiate and administer trade agreements and treaties;
- Deal with problems relating to the commodity policies of other countries which affect Australian international trade such as surplus disposals, stockpiling, barter arrangements and subsidies Assist Australian exporters and manufacturers to find markets abroad and publicise Australian goods in overseas markets by means of trade missions, exhibitions, publications (including, Overseas Trading) films and press articles;
- Administer the Trade Commissioner Service which is responsible for investigating market prospects for specific commodities and finding new trade outlets for Australian manufactured products;
- Secondary industry;
- Encourage efficiency in industry, assist in the establishment of new industries and promote overseas investment in Australian industry Conduct surveys, reviews and studies of manufacturing industries and control the export of scrap iron and steel;
- Assist Australian industry to meet import competition by way of protective duties and bounties, analyse import statistics and estimate levels of future imports, and analyse requests for temporary protection.

== Structure ==
The Department was an Australian Public Service department, staffed by officials who were responsible to the Minister for Trade and Industry.
