= International agricultural research =

The only mandated international agricultural research organization is the CGIAR The CGIAR Fund supports 15 international agricultural research centers such as the International Water Management Institute (IWMI), the International Rice Research Institute (IRRI), the International Institute of Tropical Agriculture (IITA), the International Livestock Research Institute (ILRI), the International Food Policy Research Institute (IFPRI) and the Center for International Forestry Research (CIFOR) that form the CGIAR Consortium of International Agricultural Research Centers and are located in various countries worldwide (as of 2011), The centers carry out research on various agricultural commodities, livestock, fish, water, forestry, policy and management.

Some other international agricultural organizations include the United Nations Food and Agriculture Organization, Global Forum on Agricultural Research (GFAR), The International Agriculture Center (Netherlands), The World Bank, International Fund for Agricultural Development, The Center for International Food and Agriculture Policy at the University of Minnesota.

== See also ==
- International Crop Information System
