= Australian Centre for International Agricultural Research =

Australian government agency

ACIAR Australian Centre for International Agricultural Research
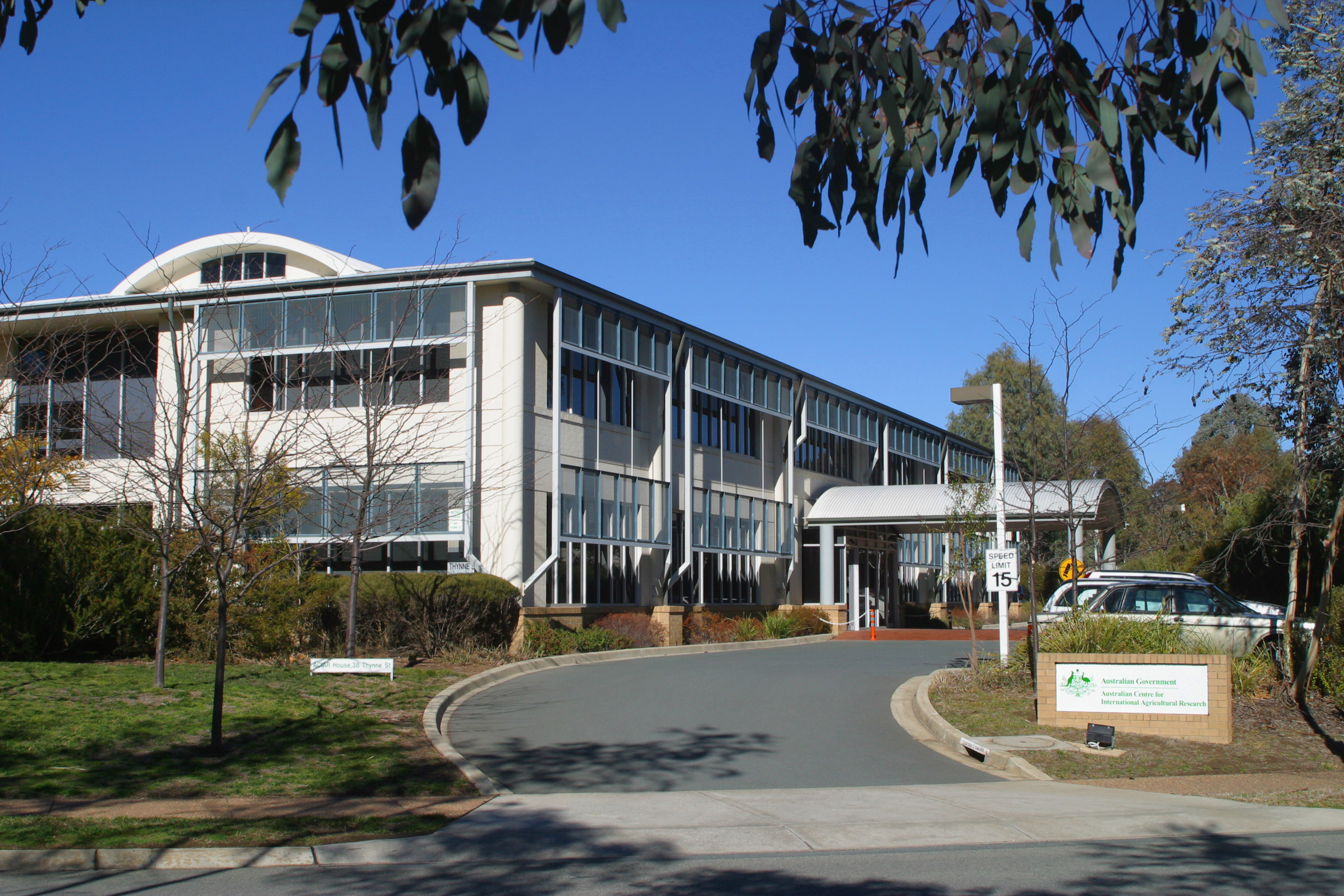

Agency overview
- Jurisdiction: Commonwealth Government
- Headquarters: Canberra, ACT, Australia
- Employees: 80
- Minister responsible: Senator the Hon Penny Wong, Minister for Foreign Affairs
- Agency executive: Professor Wendy Umberger, Chief Executive Officer
- Parent Agency: Department of Foreign Affairs and Trade
- Website: www.aciar.gov.au

Footnotes
- Foreign Affairs and Trade Portfolio

The Australian Centre for International Agricultural Research (ACIAR) is an Australian Government statutory agency that forms part of the overseas aid program in the Foreign Affairs and Trade Portfolio, reporting to the Minister of Foreign Affairs. ACIAR was established under the Australian Centre for International Agricultural Research Act 1982 (the ACIAR Act), as amended, to identify agricultural problems in developing problems and brokers Australian agricultural scientists to find solutions.

== History ==
In 1976 Sir John Crawford recommended the Australian Government set-up and fund an independent International Research Assistance Foundation in Australia in a report tabled in the Australian Parliament.

At the Commonwealth Heads of Government meeting in 1981, the Australian Government announced it would establish an agricultural research centre charged with contracting research to Australian institutions in the field of agriculture and related disciplines for the benefit of developing countries.

On 3 June 1982, ACIAR formally came into being when the Australian Centre for International Agricultural Research Act 1982 (the ACIAR Act) was passed. Sir John Crawford was appointed as the first chairman of its Board of Management, with Professor Jim McWilliam appointed as the first Director.

The first projects supported by ACIAR commenced in 1983.

== Aims and functions ==
The mission of ACIAR is to enhance the effects of Australia's agricultural science expertise by establishing and funding partnerships for agricultural research aimed at development in developing nations. ACIAR collaborates with both public and private research entities to boost the efficiency and sustainability of agricultural practices and to fortify the food systems' resilience across the Indo-Pacific partner countries. ACIAR is guided by a 10-Year Strategy that focuses strongly on issues to improve food security and reduce poverty.

The ACIAR research portfolio encompasses:

- key agriculture sectors—crops, fisheries, forestry, horticulture and livestock
- science and disciplines supporting these sectors—agronomy, plant genetics, livestock production, agribusiness, social sciences, soil and land management, water, and climate
- assessment of results and outcomes to guide future investment—impact evaluation.

ACIAR aims to contribute to poverty reduction and improved regional security with partner countries in the Pacific, East and South-East Asia, South Asia and Eastern and Southern Africa.

ACIAR develops the foundational knowledge supporting 6 key development goals:

- Enhancing food security and reducing poverty
- Managing natural resources and addressing climate change
- Improving human health and nutrition
- Promoting gender equality and empowering women
- Fostering inclusive value chains
- Strengthening scientific and policy capabilities.

ACIAR also manages Australia's investment in the international agricultural research system, chief among which is the CGIAR. ACIAR represents Australia on the CGIAR System Council, and Australians occupy a number of leadership positions across the CGIAR network.

To promote and support collaborative research initiatives that progress 6 strategic objectives, ACIAR also provides research support to other multilateral institutions, including:

- The Pacific Community – SPC
- Asia-Pacific Association of Agricultural Research Institutions
- World Vegetable Center
- Global Research Alliance on Agricultural Greenhouse Gases
- CABI
- International Centre for Insect Physiology and Ecology (icipe)

ACIAR develops and manages co-investment alliances and partnerships with like-minded organisations to foster and implement global research collaborations that support strategic development in agriculture, fisheries and forestry including the:

- International Development Research Centre (IDRC)
- Syngenta Foundation for Sustainable Agriculture
- Crawford Fund

ACIAR supports the following initiatives through global research collaborations:

- CultiAF
- Food Loss Research Program
- Demand-led breeding

The head office for ACIAR is located at ACIAR House in Canberra, Australian Capital Territory.

== Chief Executive Officer ==
Dr Nick Ausin is currently the acting Chief Executive Officer. Dr Nick Austin has extensive experience in international agricultural development and a long association with ACIAR, most recently as current President of the Policy Advisory Council. He holds a PhD in sustainable agriculture, a master degree in management and has held senior roles in international bodies, including the Bill & Melinda Gates Foundation, the CGIAR Fund Council and the Alliance for a Green Revolution in Africa. Dr Austin is an elected fellow of the Academy of Technological Sciences and Engineering and a Fellow of the Australian Institute of Company Directors. He previously served as the ACIAR Chief Executive Officer from 2009 to 2016.

== Commission for International Agricultural Research ==
The Commission for International Agricultural Research was established under Section 7 of the ACIAR Act 1982. Its functions are to provide advice to the Foreign Minister on the formulation of agricultural research programs and policies to identify agricultural problems and find solutions in developing countries.

The commissioners for the period 17 September 2023 to 16 September 2026 are:

- Mrs Fiona Simson (Chair)
- Professor Wendy Umberger
- Professor Lindsay Falvey FTSE FAIAS
- Dr Beth Woods OAM FTSE
- DrTony York
- Dr Michelle Freeman GAICD
- Ms Lukina Lukin

== Policy Advisory Council (for International Agricultural Research) ==
The Policy Advisory Council (the council) was established under Section 17 of the ACIAR Act 1982. The council provides advice to the Foreign Minister regarding agricultural problems of developing countries, and programs and policies for agricultural research that identify agricultural problems and/or find solutions to agricultural problems in developing countries.

The current board appointments are:

- Dr Nick Austin (President)
- Dr Audrey Aumua
- Dr Nguyen Van Bo
- Professor Ramesh Chand
- Dr Reynaldo Ebora
- Dr Segenet Kelemu
- Professor Teatulohi Matainaho
- Professor Achmad Suryana
- Dr Rachel Chikwamba
- Dr Surmsuk Salakpetch
- Dr Sunny Verghese
- Kathryn Campbell

== Research outcomes ==
ACIAR contributes to sustainable economic growth and enhanced regional stability within the Indo-Pacific, with a particular focus on economic diplomacy and women's economic empowerment.

Examples of ACIAR research that has been applied to improve the livelihoods of farmers both in partner countries and in Australia:

- Panama disease TR4
- Fall armyworm
- Honeybee pests and diseases
- Restoration of coral reefs
- Oysters
- Faba bean gall disease
- Fish migration in the Mekong River

ACIAR has made a significant contribution to meeting the complex challenges of growing more food, reducing poverty and improving biosecurity in the Indo-Pacific region. Over this time ACIAR has committed to assessing impact and where possible, quantifying the achievements of Australian and international research partners. A 2022 impact assessment of the research funded by ACIAR since its inception outlined the total benefit of projects is estimated at $64.4 billion with a benefit: cost ratio of 43:1.

== Fellowships, scholarships and training support ==
The John Allwright Fellowship and John Dillion Fellowship provides the opportunity for partner country scientists involved in ACIAR-supported research projects to obtain postgraduate qualifications at Australian tertiary institutions. The fellowships are administered through the Australia Awards.

The Meryl Williams Fellowship is s leadership program that aims to strengthen the leadership and management skills of women working in agricultural research for development in the Indo-Pacific and is administered through the University of New England.

The Pacific Agriculture Scholarships and Support (PASS) Program provides scholarships and support to postgraduate students in agriculture, forestry and fisheries at The University of the South Pacific and Fiji National University. ACIAR also supports training activities delivered by the Crawford Fund including the Master Class and Training Program, a program of online mentoring linking agricultural researchers from developing countries with mentors in Australia, and the next-gen suite of activities designed to build interest in careers in international agricultural research.
