= Department of Overseas Trade (Australia) =

Australian government department, 1972–1977

Department overview
- Formed: 19 December 1972
- Preceding Department: Department of Trade and Industry
- Dissolved: 20 December 1977
- Superseding Department: Department of Trade and Resources
- Jurisdiction: Commonwealth of Australia
- Headquarters: Canberra
- Ministers responsible: Jim Cairns, Minister (1972–1974); Frank Crean, Minister (1974–1975); Doug Anthony, Minister (1975–1977)
- Department executive: Doug McKay, Secretary

The Department of Overseas Trade was an Australian government department that existed between December 1972 and December 1977.

== History ==
The Department was one of several new Departments established by the Whitlam government, a wide restructuring that revealed some of the new government's program.

== Scope ==
Information about the department's functions and government funding allocation could be found in the Administrative Arrangements Orders, the annual Portfolio Budget Statements and in the Department's annual reports.

At the department's creation it was responsible for:

- Trade and Commerce with other countries, including trade promotion
- Organising trade fairs, exhibitions and field days overseas to promote Australian made products
- Trade agreements and export services
- Publishing Overseas Trading

== Structure ==
The Department was a Commonwealth Public Service department, staffed by officials who were responsible to the Minister for Overseas Trade.
