= Gladstone Eyre =

Australian artist (1862–1933)

- Born: William James Gladstone Eyre; 11 June 1862; Melbourne, Victoria, Australia
- Died: 2 May 1933 (aged 70); North Sydney, New South Wales, Australia
- Occupation: Artist
- Spouse: Margaret Ross Falconer (m. 1883)
- Children: Winifred (b. 1884), Julian William (b. 1888, d. 1889), Everett (b. 1892)
- Parent(s): William Eyre, and Amelia Watts

Gladstone Eyre (11 June 1862 – 2 May 1933) was an Australian portrait artist and landscape painter around Sydney, New South Wales and Launceston, Tasmania in the late 19th and early 20th centuries.

== Early life ==
William James Gladstone Eyre was born on 11 June 1862 in Brunswick, Victoria, the child of William Eyre and Amelia née Watts. The other siblings were Arthur Willesley Eyre (born 1856), Alice Augusta H. C. Eyre (born 1858), Samuel Morton Pets Eyre (born 1860), Charles Pelham Villiers Eyre (born 1864), Henry John Temple Eyre (born 1864), Mary Amelia Victoria Felicia Eyre (born 1865), Josephine Fanny Eyre (born 1867), Frances Burdett Coutts Eyre (b./d. 1868), and Frederick Constantine Grosvenor Eyre (born 1869, died 1870).

His eldest brother Arthur went to Scotch College, Melbourne in 1868, where Dutch–Australian painter Henry Leonardus van den Houten (1801–1879) taught. Eyre was taught elementary drawing by van den Houten.

In 1877 the family moved to Sydney, and Eyre studied under Norwegian painter Knud Bull (1811–1889). Eyre's father was a land developer and later established the Blue Mountains township of Leura, the area of interest becoming of interest to Eyre.

Aged twenty, Eyre married Margaret Ross Falconer, of Balmain, on 26 June 1883 at Saint James' Church, Sydney.

They had three children. A daughter, Winifred Margaret was born 10 April 1884, when they lived at Eleanor Villa, Snail's Bay, Balmain. Their infant son Julian William Eyre died aged 1 year and 5 months on 22 November 1889, when they lived at Bellagie, Hunter's Hill. They had been living at their Bella Vista residence in Snails Bay. Their third child was a son, Everett (given as John Everett Millais Eyre), born in Launceston in March 1892.

== Career ==
In 1883 Eyre became a member of the Art Society of New South Wales (and again in 1904 when returning to the State), and through the 1880s, he established himself as a portrait painter. He operated a studio at the Pastoral Chambers, at 375 George Street. Others' paintings were advertised and sold commercially including in 1884, J. M. W. Turner's renowned 1831 Caligula's Palace and Bridge. (Note: 'Caligula's palace' had been in Melbourne in December 1882, but was unable to be sold, the price set at £4000.) (Note: Whilst 'Caligula's palace and bridge' was advertised by purchase by Eyre in 1884, Turner's painting is currently in the Tate Britain and 'Accepted by the nation as part of the Turner Bequest 1856'. It is unknown when this work was returned to Great Britain to become part of the bequest.)

Eyre moved to Launceston in 1891 with his wife and family where his paintings were displayed in a shop front of a local photographer. His Tasmanian landscapes were in oils, crayon, and watercolours. Eyre went onto teach evening classes, and undertaking the restoration of old paintings. He donated at least one painting for charitable purposes, including in 1900 of a portrait of Lord Roberts for the Indian famine relief fund, as well as regularly selling his works. In April 1899, he travelled to Sydney to sell a collection of his paintings, mostly Tasmanian scenery.

In 1902, aged 39, Eyre and his family moved back to Sydney in 1902. It was indicated the then-Australia Hotel in Sydney contained a number of very fine paintings of Australian scenes including eight watercolours by Eyre.

== Later life ==
His daughter Winifred became involved in stage productions in Launceston in the late 1890s. Eyre also recited and sung at these productions, and painted the background sceneries. Winifred later married Oswald Augustus Nelson in North Sydney on 4 August 1906.

His son Everett married Mary Daly, had a daughter Joyce, but died aged 36, on 7 January 1929 in Sydney, when the family was living at 1 Chandos Street, Saint Leonards. He was buried at the Church of England Cemetery, Northern Suburbs, Sydney.

Eyre resided at 56 Middle Street, McMahon's Point, North Sydney until his death in 1933. Suffering from insomnia for some time, he left his home early on Monday morning, but was found floating at Athol Bight near the zooloogical gardens on Tuesday, 2 May 1933. He was privately interred at the Northern Suburbs Cemetery.

== Works ==
A sample of some of Eyre's portraits, and landscapes.

=== Portraits ===
- W. Saurin Lyster (1828–1880), impresario (1881). Commissioned by vocalist Armes Beaumont.
- John Tait (1813–1888), racehorse owner (1883), life-size.
- Archbishop Vaughan (1834–1883), Sydney (1883).
- Vincent Giblin (1817–1884), late-general manager of the Australian Joint Stock Bank (1884).
- Sir Alfred Stephen, Lieutenant-governor of the Colony of New South Wales (1885), in oils.
- J. T. Gannon, President of the Mechanics' Institute, Goulburn, New South Wales (1885), life-size bust, in oils, drawn from an earlier photograph. In a gilt frame, 4 feet (1.2 m) by 3 feet (0.91 m).
- Truganini (1891).
- Sir Henry Parkes (pre-1898). This may have been separate to the 1881 large life-size portrait in oils, painted with the NSW premier wearing decorations including the KCMG. Another portrait from life, in oils, of Parkes was painted in September 1885.
- Sir William Lambert Dobson (1833–1898), late-Chief Justice, Tasmania (1898).
- Major-General Robert Baden-Powell (1900), attired in the uniform of the 5th Dragoon Guards, in oils.

=== Landscapes ===
- 'Cataract Gorge, First basin', Launceston (1892), once exhibited in the Victoria Museum and Art Gallery. It has been exhibited as recently as 2020. The original sketch was done in December 1891 when the Cataract was in flood.

== See also ==
- List of Australian artists
