= Edward Henty =

Australian politician

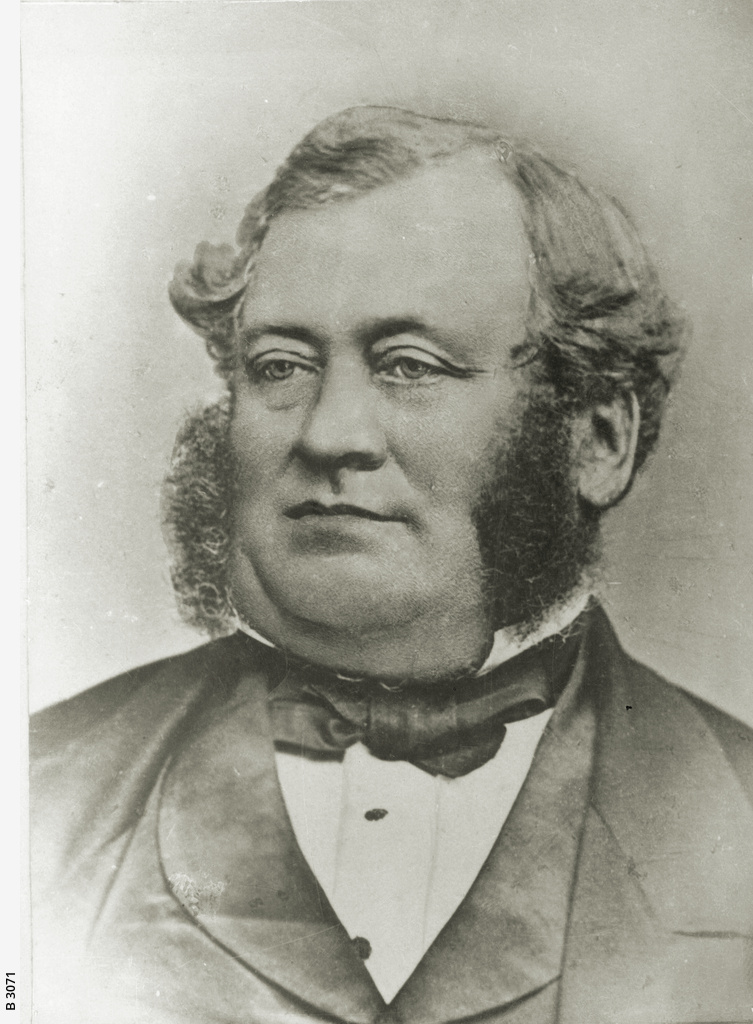
- Born: 28 March 1810; Tarring, Sussex, England
- Died: 14 August 1878 (aged 68); Melbourne, Colony of Victoria

Edward Henty (28 March 1810 – 14 August 1878), was a pioneer British colonist and is regarded as the first permanent settler in the Port Phillip district (later known as the colony of Victoria), Australia.

== Early life and family background ==
Edward was born in Tarring, West Sussex, England, the fourth surviving son of Thomas Henty, and his wife Frances Elizabeth Hopkins of Poling, West Sussex. His father inherited £30,000 and bought a plot of land and bred high value Merino sheep, some of which were purchased by capitalist entrepreneurs in the Australian colonies such as John Macarthur. After an economic downturn hit England in the mid 1820s, Edward's eldest brother James Henty thought that better opportunities for the family existed in Australia. In 1829 James travelled to the Swan River Colony with two other brothers, Stephen and John. Edward remained in Sussex, studying and assisting his father with his business interests there.

== Van Diemen's Land ==
Edward's brothers in the west of Australia had a difficult time obtaining grants to productive land and decided to move to Launceston in Van Diemen's Land where their prospects would likely improve. In the meanwhile their father, Thomas Henty, decided to bring the rest of the family to the Australian colonies, selling most of his assets in England and sailing for Launceston. He arrived in April 1832 with Edward and the three remaining siblings Charles, Jane and Francis.

== Affiliations ==
- TS Henty, Australian Navy Cadets
- Victorian Railways S class locomotive S302 Edward Henty

== See also ==
- Henty brothers
- Whaling in Australia

== Notes ==
Victorian Legislative Assembly
New parliament	Member for Normanby; 1856–1861	Succeeded by George Levey
