= Mary E. Bouligny =

American socialite and author (1839–1908)

Mary Elizabeth Bouligny Levey
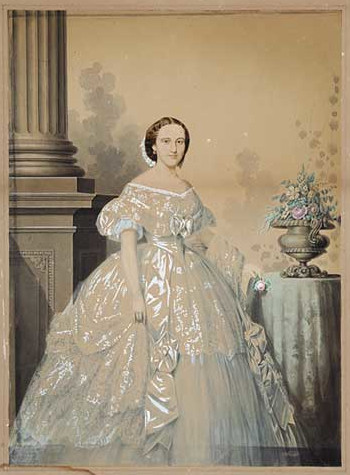
- Watercolor portrait of Mary Elizabeth Parker Bouligny (1860) by Henry Ulke
- Born: Mary Elizabeth Parker; 1839; Washington, D.C.
- Died: October 10, 1908 (age 68); Richmond, Surrey, England
- Occupation: Writer
- Spouse(s): John Edward Bouligny (m. 1860; died 1864) George Collins Levey (m. 1877)
- Children: 2
- Writing career
- Genre: Memoir

Mary Elizabeth Bouligny Levey (née Parker; 1839 – October 10, 1908) was a Washington socialite and author.

== Early life ==
Mary Elizabeth Parker was born in Washington, D.C., to a prominent local merchant, George Parker, and his wife, Ann Cover.

== Washington life ==
On May 1, 1860, when she was about 21, Parker married John Edward Bouligny, a recently elected congressman from Louisiana, in what The Washington Star called "perhaps the most brilliant wedding that has ever taken place in the Federal metropolis." The event was attended by President James Buchanan, several cabinet secretaries, and numerous members of Congress. Years later, the wedding was misidentified as the occasion when Buchanan learned of South Carolina's secession; however, that did not happen until December 1860.

Bouligny was the only member of the Louisiana congressional delegation who refused to resign his seat when the state seceded, so the couple mostly remained in Washington during the Civil War, living at her father's home. In May 1864, Bouligny died at the Parker family home. After Bouligny's death, she remained active in social and political circles in Washington, including raising funds for the completion of the Washington Monument.

In 1877, she married Australian politician and journalist George Collins Levey, traveling with him back to Australia and his family home in England. Levey had been in the United States, representing Australia at the 1876 Centennial Exposition in Philadelphia, when he and Mary Elizabeth met. They spent their first year of marriage apart: Mary Elizabeth returned to Washington after the death of her mother, while Levey continued on to Australia.

== Author ==
In 1867, she sailed from Boston to Europe, traveling through France, Belgium, Holland, and England, before returning to the U.S. the following summer. Her letters and diaries from the trip later became the basis for her first book, Bubbles and Ballast, which was subtitled "being a description of life in Paris during the brilliant days of the empire; a tour through Belgium and Holland, and a sojourn in London. By a Lady." and published in 1871.

She later published A Tribute to W. W. Corcoran, of Washington City in 1874, lionizing philanthropist and art collector William Wilson Corcoran and detailing the collection of his recently opened Gallery of Art.

== Congressional act for relief ==
In 1867, as part of settling a long-standing property dispute, the 39th Congress passed an act awarding one-sixth of the land granted to Jean Antoine Bernard d'Autrive in 1765 to the heirs of John Edward Bouligny — his widow Mary Elizabeth, and their two daughters — in recognition of his loyalty to the Union. Similar measures had passed one house of Congress previously, but this was the first time both houses approved it. As the land was already deeded to others, the Bouligny heirs were entitled to claim 75,840 acres (30,690 ha) of public lands elsewhere in the country at a price of $1.25 per acre. The following year, the 40th Congress passed a joint resolution suspending the act. In 1888, the remarried Mary Elizabeth sought to claim the promised land, but her petition was rejected by the Department of the Interior, a decision affirmed a year later by the Supreme Court.

During the 1876 presidential election, the Democratic Party noted that Republican candidate Rutherford B. Hayes's only speech before the House as a member of Congress was in support of revoking the act.

== Family ==
Mary Elizabeth and John Edward Bouligny had two daughters: Corrine and Felicie. Felicie's daughter, Odette Le Fontenay, was a French opera singer in the 20th century.

== Bibliography ==
=== Books ===
- Bubbles and Ballast: being a description of life in Paris during the brilliant days of the empire; a tour through Belgium and Holland, and a sojourn in London. By a lady. (1871) Baltimore: Kelly, Piet and Company [published as M. E. P. B.]
- A Tribute to W. W. Corcoran, of Washington City (1874) Philadelphia: Porter & Coates [published as M. E. Bouligny]
