= John Edward Bouligny =

Pro-Union Louisiana politician (1824–1864)

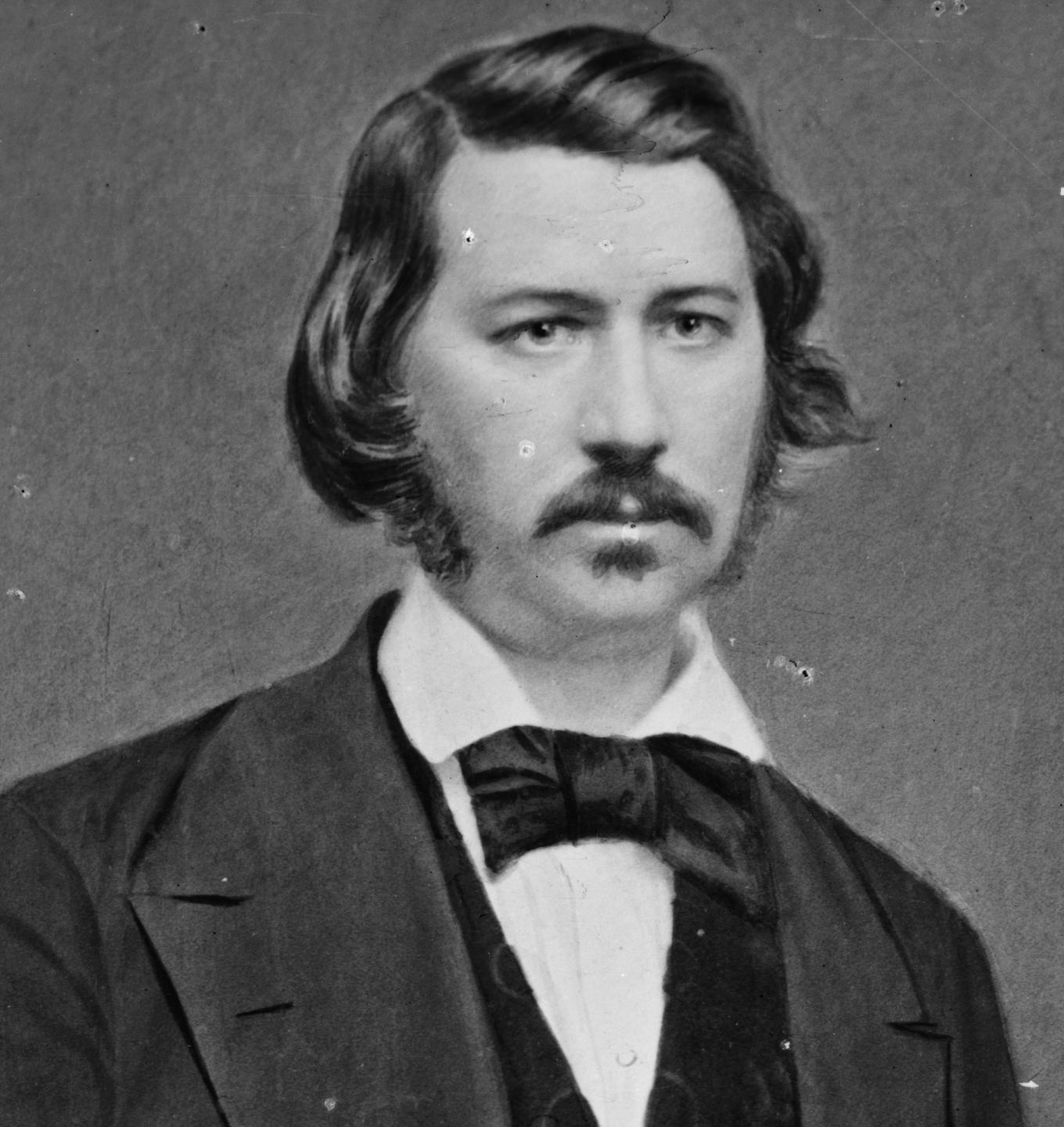

Member of the U.S. House of Representatives from Louisiana's 1st district
- In office December 5, 1859 – March 3, 1861
- Preceded by: George Eustis Jr.
- Succeeded by: Benjamin Flanders (1862)

Personal details
- Born: February 5, 1824 New Orleans, Louisiana, U.S.
- Died: February 20, 1864 (aged 40) Washington, D.C., U.S.
- Resting place: Congressional Cemetery
- Party: American
- Spouse: Mary Elizabeth Parker (m. 1860)
- Education: Transylvania University
- Occupation: Lawyer
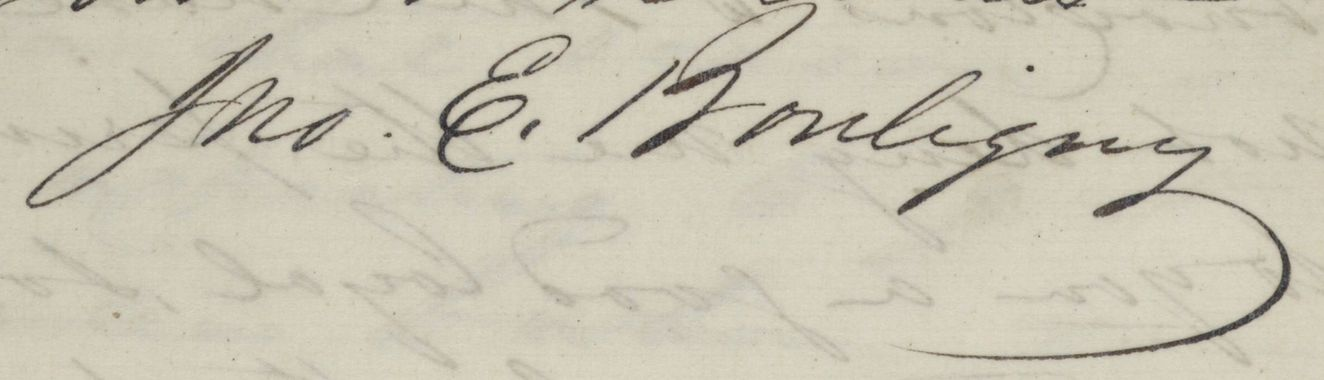
- Signature

John Edward Bouligny (February 5, 1824 – February 20, 1864) was an American politician who was a member of the U.S. House of Representatives representing the state of Louisiana. He served one term as a member of the Know Nothing movement's anti-immigrant American Party. During his term, Louisiana seceded from the Union, but Bouligny remained in Washington and refused to resign. He was the only member of Congress from Louisiana to not resign or vacate his seat after the state seceded.

== Biography ==
Bouligny, who went by his middle name Edward, was born in New Orleans. He was the son of Louisiana state Representative Louis Bouligny and Elizabeth Virginie D'Hauterive. His uncle, Charles Dominique Joseph Bouligny, had served one term as U.S. Senator from Louisiana in the 1820s and his grandfather, Francisco Bouligny, was a high-ranking colonial official and military governor of Spanish Louisiana in the late 18th century. Bouligny attended public schools in New Orleans before studying law and being admitted to the bar. In 1852, he was appointed "assistant-appraiser of merchandize" for the U.S. Custom House in New Orleans by President Millard Fillmore, serving until his removal the following year by President Franklin Pierce.

Bouligny became involved with Know Nothing politics in the 1850s and by 1855 was a party secretary in the state. While the national American Party was firmly pro-Protestant, the Know Nothings found strong support in Louisiana, including in largely Catholic New Orleans. In contrast to the national party, the Louisiana American Party refused to adopt a religious test for membership, making it welcoming to pro-slavery, anti-immigrant former Whigs, including Catholic Creoles like Bouligny.

Bouligny was elected recorder for the Fourth Municipal District of New Orleans in 1856, making him responsible for trying and sentencing cases involving public nuisances and petty crimes. The Fourth District was incorporated into New Orleans in 1852; prior to then it was Lafayette City, Jefferson Parish, and Bouligny's older brother, Francis, had served as its mayor.

=== Congressman ===
Bouligny's remarks on the secession of Louisiana

In 1859, in what was described as a "brisk, close and earnest" nomination contest, Bouligny was selected to run as the American Party candidate for Louisiana's 1st congressional district. He defeated Judge T.G. Hunt Jr., an old-line Whig, and state Rep. Charles Didier Dreux. Bouligny edged Dreux by just two votes at the party convention. Bouligny won the November election with plurality of 49.13% of the vote, defeating former Democratic representative Emile La Sére and States Rights candidate Charles Bienvenu. During the 36th Congress, Bouligny sat on the House Committee on Private Land Claims. According to GovTrack, Bouligny missed 197 of 433 roll call votes during his one term in Congress.

In the 1860 presidential election, Bouligny publicly supported the Democratic candidate Stephen A. Douglas.

Bouligny was strongly opposed to Louisiana's secession from the United States of America, stating in a speech before Congress on February 5, 1861, that he answered not to the Louisiana secession convention but to the people who elected him. Bouligny went on to say that if his constituents called for him to step down, he would do so but would "remain a Union man." Despite the rest of the Louisiana delegation resigning or vacating their seats after Louisiana withdrew from the Union on January 26, 1861, Bouligny remained in Congress until the expiry of his term on March 3, 1861. In February 1861, he was the only Louisianan to participate in the Peace Conference of 1861.

=== After secession ===
Bouligny returned to New Orleans and in November 1861 stood unsuccessfully for election as a justice of the peace. Reportedly, Bouligny fought a number of duels (at least one per month between late 1861 and mid 1862) due to his support for the Union. His left hand was shot through in a duel on December 29, 1861, but he continued to duel into 1863 by which time his arm was also paralyzed. He was referred to as "probably the most famous duelist in the State" by Confederate sailor James M. Morgan.

In 1862, after issuing the Emancipation Proclamation, President Lincoln engaged Bouligny to determine if Union-occupied New Orleans and other portions of Louisiana could hold early elections to send representatives to Congress. Once elections were approved, Bouligny ran for reelection to his vacant seat in Congress, but was handily defeated by Benjamin Flanders, who had the backing of the Union military governor of Louisiana, Benjamin Butler. Bouligny won just 136 votes against Flanders's 2,184 votes. Bouligny attributed his loss to interference by Butler in the election, which Butler denied, and Bouligny was later (falsely) rumored to have shot Butler in a duel. Although Lincoln had considered appointing Bouligny to a position at the Port of New Orleans after he left Congress, after Bouligny lost his bid for reelection Lincoln, was less willing to find a patronage position for him.

Bouligny later returned to Washington, where he died at his father-in-law's house in February 1864. He was interred in a Parker family plot at Congressional Cemetery.

== Personal life ==
Bouligny was multilingual. French and Spanish were used in his family home and in correspondence with cousins in Europe, while he used English in letters with his wife. In Congress, he conducted business in English, although during the debate over the election of a speaker for the 36th Congress, Bouligny responded to a quip from Emerson Etheridge, who had said he called "every man my friend who wears an honest face, speaks the English language, swears by the Holy Bible, and does not spell Constitution with a 'K,'" by asking if he was excluded from the remarks "because I do not speak the English language."

Bouligny arrived in Washington as a bachelor, but on May 1, 1860, he married Mary Elizabeth Parker, the daughter of Washington merchant George Parker. The wedding was considered "perhaps the most brilliant wedding that has ever taken place in the Federal metropolis." The event was attended by President James Buchanan, several cabinet secretaries, and numerous members of Congress. Years later, the wedding was misidentified as where Buchanan learned of South Carolina's secession; however, that did not happen until December 1860.

The couple had two daughters, Corrine and Felicie. Felicie's daughter, Odette Le Fontenay, was an opera singer in the 20th century.

In 1867, as part of settling a long-standing property dispute, the 39th Congress passed an act, awarding one-sixth of the land granted to Jean Antoine Bernard D'Autrive in 1765 to Bouligny's widow, Mary Elizabeth, and their two daughters in recognition of his loyalty to the Union. As the land was already deeded to others, however, the Bouligny heirs were entitled to claim 75,840 acres (30,690 ha) of public lands elsewhere in the country at a price of $1.25 per acre. The following year, the 40th Congress passed a joint resolution suspending the act. When Mary Elizabeth, now married to George Levey, sought to claim the promised land in 1888, her petition was rejected by the Department of the Interior, a decision that was a year later affirmed by the Supreme Court. During the 1876 presidential election, the Democratic Party noted that Republican candidate Rutherford B. Hayes's only speech before the House as a member of Congress was in support of revoking the act.

== See also ==
- List of Hispanic and Latino Americans in the United States Congress

U.S. House of Representatives
Preceded by George Eustis Jr.	Member of the U.S. House of Representatives from Louisiana's 1st congressional district 1859–1861	Succeeded by (Vacant 1861–1862); Benjamin Flanders
