= George Levey =

Australian politician

George Collins Levey CMG
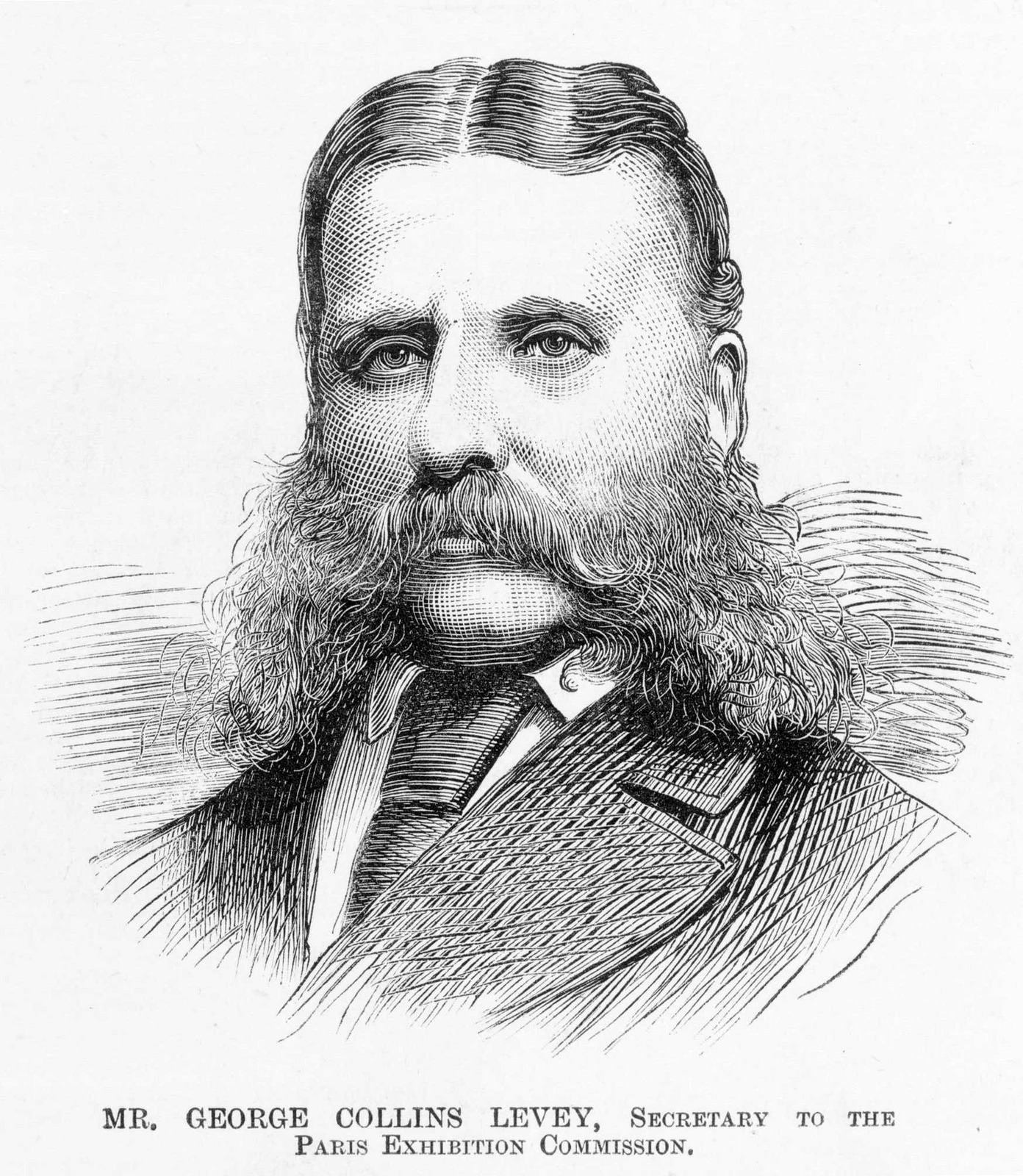

Member of the Victorian Legislative Assembly for Normanby
- In office 30 August 1861 – 30 December 1867
- Preceded by: Edward Henty
- Succeeded by: Thomas Cope

Personal details
- Born: 13 April 1835 London, England
- Died: 13 April 1919 (aged 84) London, England
- Spouses: Euphemia Dalton Ligar (m. 1863; died 1875) Mary Elizabeth Parker Bouligny (m. 1877; died 1908)
- Education: University College, London
- Occupation: Journalist
- Known for: Sydney Intercolonial Exhibition
- Awards: Companion of the Order of St Michael and St George; Legion of Honour

George Collins Levey CMG (13 April 1835 – 13 April 1919), was an Australian politician and newspaper owner.

== Early life ==
Levey was the son of George Levey of Camberwell Grove, and Great New Street in London. G. C. Levey was born in London and educated at University College, London.

== Career ==
Levey arrived in Australia in 1851, and was for a short time in the Government service of Victoria as clerk to the Gold Receiver, but subsequently embarked on mining pursuits, and was the first to employ machinery for quartz crushing. He afterwards wrote for the Melbourne press, and travelled over the continent of Europe from 1859 to 1861, contributing to English newspapers. He was twice elected for Normanby to the Victorian Legislative Assembly, serving from 1861 to 1867, and was editor and proprietor of the Herald from 1863 to 1868. This paper he issued at a penny, and thus founded cheap journalism in Australia. From 1868 he was connected as editor or contributor with the Melbourne Age.

Levey was Secretary to the Commissioners of Victoria at the Exhibitions of New South Wales (1870), Melbourne (1872, 1875, and 1880–81), London and Vienna (1873), and Philadelphia (1876); Acting Executive Commissioner at the Paris Exhibition in 1878 (C.M.G. and Legion of Honour); and Executive Commissioner at the Amsterdam Exhibition in 1883 and Executive Commissioner at the International Exhibition held at the Crystal Palace in 1884. He visited the European countries and the United States of America, with the view to induce their Governments to send representatives to the Melbourne International Exhibition. He was Secretary of the London Committee for the Adelaide Jubilee International Exhibition in 1887, contributed largely to the Melbourne, London, Philadelphia, New York and Paris press, and wrote various important official reports. He visited South America in 1889, and on his return wrote A Handy Guide to the River Plate (1890), and he later published A Handy Guide to Australasia (1891). He also edited Hutchinson's Australasian Encyclopædia (1892) and contributed to the 1911 Encyclopædia Britannica.

== Family ==
Levey married first, in 1863, Euphemia Caulfield Dalton Ligar, daughter of Charles Whybrow Ligar, surveyor-general of Victoria; and, second, in 1877, Mary Elizabeth Parker Bouligny, daughter of George Parker, of Washington, D.C., and widow of the Hon. John Edward Bouligny, member of Congress for New Orleans, Louisiana.

Parliament of Victoria
Preceded by Edward Henty	Member for Normanby; 1861–1867	Succeeded by Thomas Cope
