= Navy League of Australia =

Advocacy group (1900–)

The Navy League of Australia is an Australian organisation and advocacy group dedicated to creating interest in maritime and naval matters, particularly those relating to the Royal Australian Navy (RAN) and the Australian Merchant Navy.

The Navy League of Australia was established in November 1900 as the Australian branch of the United Kingdom Navy League. State-level sub-branches were combined under a federal body in 1939, and in 1950, the Navy League of Australia began to operate independently of its British parent.

The organisation's main aims are to promote the ideas of a strong navy and merchant navy to Australian people, politicians, and the media, support organisations and industries that work towards improving and maintaining the maritime and defence industries, and promoting an interest in maritime matters. In 1920, the New South Wales branch of the Navy League established a cadet-training organisation, the Navy League Sea Cadet Corps. This operated until 1950, when the Australian Sea Cadet Corps was formed, operated by the Navy League with support from the Royal Australian Navy. In 1973 the Australian Sea Cadet Corps was merged with the RANR Cadets operated by the RAN Reserve to form the Naval Reserve Cadets (NRC). In 2000 the NRC was renamed as the Australian Navy Cadets (ANC), and although operated by the RAN, the Navy League continues to support and assist the ANC.

== Publication ==
A quarterly journal titled The Navy has been published continuously by the Navy League of Australia since 1938, with a predecessor publication published between 1920 and 1932.
