= The Australia Hotel =

Former hotel in Sydney, Australia

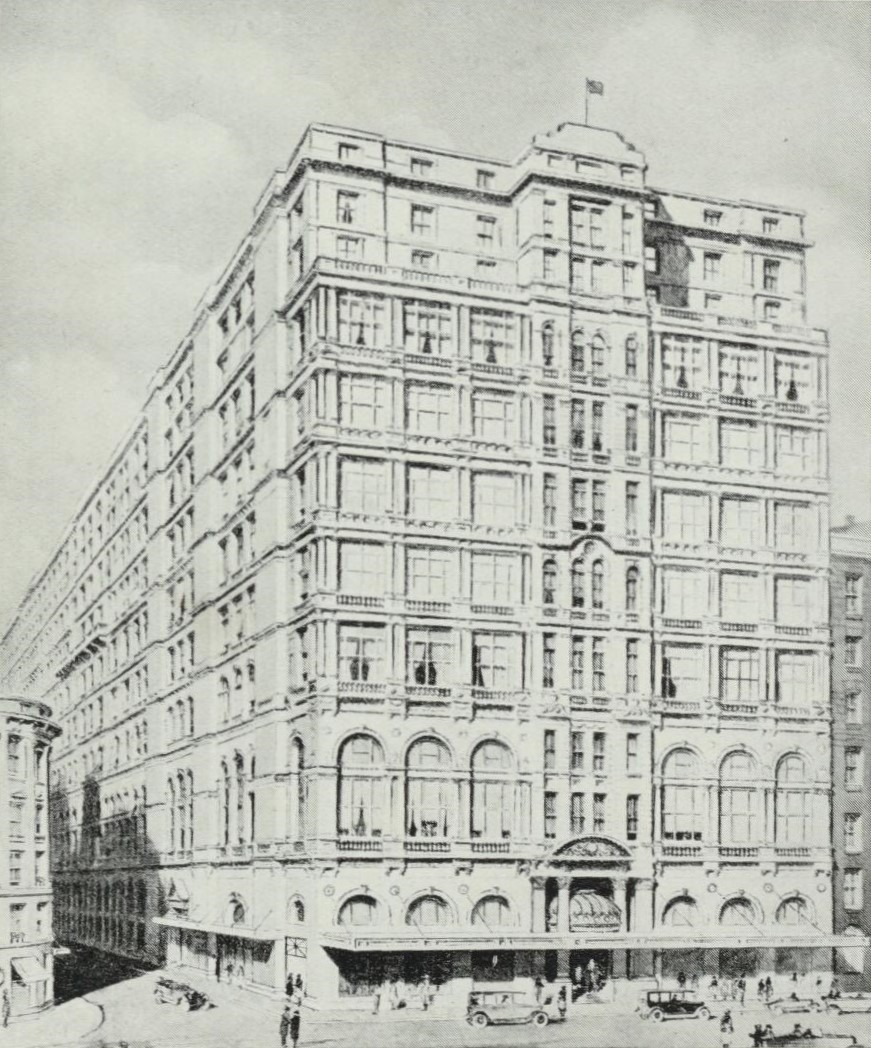
- Sketch of The Australia Hotel
- Interactive map of the The Australia Hotel area

General information
- Status: Demolished
- Type: Hotel
- Architectural style: Late Victorian
- Location: 45 Castlereagh Street, Sydney, Australia
- Coordinates: 33°52′05″S 151°12′35″E
- Groundbreaking: 18 June 1889
- Opened: 1 July 1891
- Closed: 30 June 1971
- Demolished: c. 1971 – c. 1972
- Cost: £200,000 (approx. $50m in 2024)

Height
- Height: 161 ft (49 m)

Technical details
- Floor count: 10

Design and construction
- Architecture firm: Mansfield Brothers
- Developer: Anglo-Australian Investment, Land and Finance Company
- Civil engineer: Norman Selfe
- Main contractor: Alexander Dean and Sons

Renovating team
- Architect: Emil Sodersteen

The Australia Hotel was a hotel on Castlereagh Street, Sydney, Australia. From its opening in 1891 until its closure on 30 June 1971 and subsequent demolition, the hotel was considered 'the best-known hotel in Australia', 'the premier hotel in Sydney' and described itself as 'The Hotel of the Commonwealth'. The hotel was situated in one of Sydney's important thoroughfares in the Sydney central business district.

== Construction ==
The foundation stone was laid by NSW Premier Henry Parkes on 18 June 1889.

== Opening ==
The official opening of the new establishment was performed in July 1891 by the world famous French stage actress Sarah Bernhardt, whose name was first to entered in the new hotel's register, and was subsequently displayed in a glass showcase in the main foyer. The Sydney Morning Herald reported "French actress Sarah Bernhardt arrived in Sydney, bringing with her 100 pieces of luggage. As hundreds of fans flooded onto Redfern railway station platform as her train approached, she was whisked away from the platform to the Australia Hotel where hundreds more excited fans wanted to catch a glimpse of the glamorous celebrity. Her expensive flower filled 2nd floor suite played host to pets including a large St Bernard, a smaller pug dog, a native bear and several cages containing possums and parrots. Theatergoers, many of whom had paid up to £2 for a seat, were genuinely moved by Mme Bernhardt's performance in Dumas' La Dame aux Camellias at Her Majesty's Theatre. After the show, drama critics called her a 'woman of genius' saying she had held the audience spell bound." Next to the hotel, across Rowe Street, stood the famous Theatre Royal.

== Architecture ==
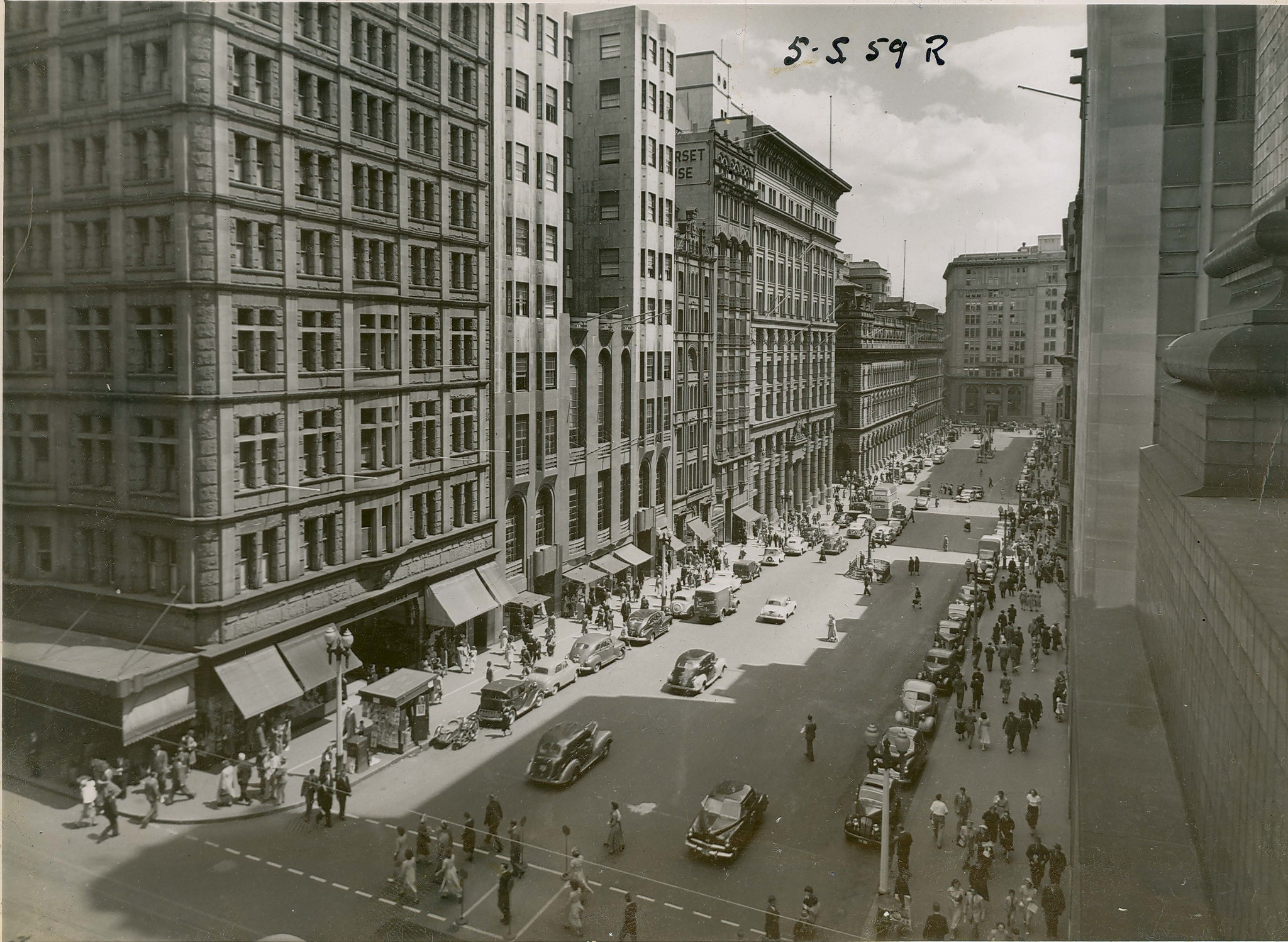
The building on the corner to the left is the Commercial Travellers Association & Club Building, and it and the 'modern' twin-wings of The Australia's Martin Place extension next to it were demolished in 1971–2 to make way for the MLC Centre.

The hotel had a large main entrance on Castlereagh Street in polished granite, the stairs grey and white marble, the doric columns red. The squared columns in the entrance foyer were imported Italian marble, and the magnificent neo-classical staircase which led from the main foyer to the first floor was completely in multi-coloured Carrara marble. From that floor to the 10th a massive carved and highly polished mahogany Victorian grand staircase, with stained glass windows, led to their rooms those guests, who, in the early days of lifts, still preferred to walk.

The first floor contained a pillared corridor with various reception rooms, in addition to the Winter Garden - 'famous for its morning and afternoon teas, light luncheons, and theatre suppers', and the Moorish Lounge, leading to the huge dining room — the Emerald Room, with its highly decorated ceiling some 6.1 metres (20 ft) above the guests, Italian chandeliers, and a dais at the west end containing a white marble operating fountain and other statues, engulfed in palm court style shrubbery.

In the late 1920s an extension was constructed to the north of the main hotel which fronted onto Martin Place. A highlight of this block was its circular art deco black glass staircase.

A small branch of department store David Jones was located in the hotel, which provided goods for visitors, hampers for sending to Great Britain and Australiana souvenirs.

The hotel also contained a number of very fine paintings of Australian scenes including eight watercolours by Gladstone Eyre.

== Standards ==
The hotel boasted international standards of comfort and service. The Australia became "the place to stay and be seen by the upper echelons of society". The hotel remained an oasis for those who scorned modernity and sought the more refined atmosphere of the classic European hotels. Apart from the accommodation for guests, rooms were also provided in the Rowe Street wing for their servants, including the children's nurses, who had their own dining room with their charges. Robert Helpmann had a suite permanently reserved; Marlene Dietrich stayed there several times (thereafter her suite, rooms 707–708, was named after her) and one lady lived there for 31 years.

== Notable events ==
A patron stands on the marble steps of the doomed Australia Hotel. The closure notice is pasted on a column.

The hotel hosted many famous events.

- On Monday, 28 January 1901, the hotel saw the literary Bohemian society of Sydney gather for the send-off of Scottish-Australian poet and bush balladeer Will H. Ogilvie (1869–1963). Those present included painter Julian Ashton, writer Barbara Baynton, poet Christopher Brennan, poet Victor Daley, writer Albert Dorrington, playwright Alice Eyton, sculptor Nelson Illingworth, artist Fred Leist, poet Louise Mack (Mrs Creed), singer Eva Mylott, poet Banjo Paterson, poet and member of parliament Patrick Quinn, his brother and poet Roderic Quinn, artist Tom Roberts, activist Rose Scott, artist David Souter, journalist and suffragist Agnes Storrie, and writer and critic Alfred Stephens.
- The hotel was the venue for the first meeting for the establishment of the Wireless Institute of Australia in March 1910.
- Later in 1910 AWA obtained a licence from the Postmaster-General's Department to run telegraphy tests, from the hotel's 6th floor, with ships at sea, on 27 August. It was subsequently permitted to handle commercial traffic in 1911 – the first in Australia.
- 5 December 1915 a fire broke out at 11.30 am in the north-east corner of the roof and quickly spread, eventually gutting the upper three floors, but without loss of life.
- In April 1919 the famous entertainer Sir Harry Lauder was staying at The Australia and giving a luncheon party when he was formally notified that he was to be knighted upon his return to Britain.
- In January 1941 Cabinet Ministers gave a dinner at The Australia for Robert Menzies who was about to leave for Great Britain.
- In April 1949 the hotel had the historic importance of being the venue of the first successful television demonstration in Australia, when the State Governor, Lieutenant-General John Northcott was televised in the hotel's ballroom as he opened the demonstration.

== Closure, demolition, heritage ==
The hotel was put to auction on 25 February 1970 by Richard Stanton and Sons and was purchased by MLC who, amid mounting concerns, announced their intention of refurbishing and maintaining the hotel, one of the city's landmarks. However they later announced the hotel's impending closure, and The Australia closed on 30 June 1971. The building was demolished in almost record time in 1971 and 1972, to erect a modern $200 million, 68-storey office block/skyscraper in its place; the MLC Centre by architect Harry Seidler.

The Royal Australian Historical Society who fix their famous Green Plaques to historic buildings and sites, placed their 39th plaque on the MLC Centre in memory of the Australia Hotel.
