= Victorian Intercolonial Exhibition =

1875 world's fair

1875 Melbourne
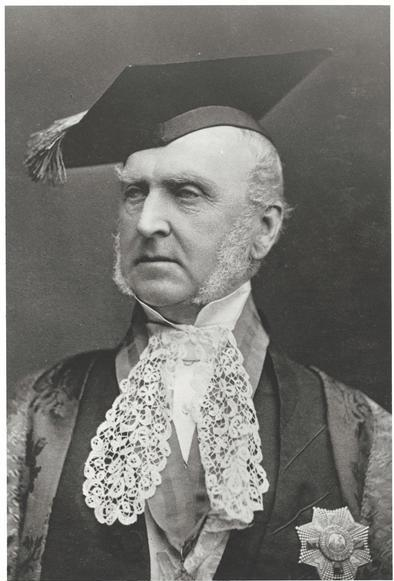
- Redmond Barry, chairman of the commissioners

Overview
- BIE-class: Unrecognized exposition
- Name: Victorian Intercolonial Exhibition
- Visitors: 300000

Participant(s)
- Countries: 7

Location
- Country: Colony of Victoria
- City: Melbourne
- Coordinates: 37.809801°S 144.964787°E

Timeline
- Opening: 2 September 1875
- Closure: 16 November 1875

The Victorian Intercolonial Exhibition world's fair was held in Melbourne, Colony of Victoria between 2 September and 16 November 1875.

== Commission ==
The original commission comprised Sir Redmond Barry, acting chief justice; members of the Victorian Legislative Assembly (M.L.A.): J. J. Casey, J. F. Sullivan, C. J. Jennor, J. Munro; James Gatehouse (mayor of Melbourne); the former mayor J. McIlwraith; and J. I. Bleasdale.

And later the following became additional commissioners: John O'Shanassy (former premier of Victoria); James McCulloch, J. A. Macpherson, J. T. Smith, J. Bosisto (all M.L.A.s); S. H. Bindon; the Count de Castelnau; L. J. Sherrard; and J. Danks. G. C. Levey who had experience with the Victorian Exhibition of 1872, and the London International and Vienna Exhibitions of 1873 was appointed secretary.

== Location ==
The exhibition was held in the Public Library (as were earlier exhibitions in 1866 and 1872) along with a specially constructed 190 ft by 60 ft iron and wood building.

== Contributors ==
There were exhibitors from the colonies of Victoria (805), New South Wales, South Australia, Tasmania (118) and Northern Territory (86), along with Singapore (2) and Japan (2).

== Displays ==
Displays included two beer exhibits from Yarra Bend Asylum, three copper engraved maps of Victoria organised by Alexander John Skene and A C Allen and engraved by Slight and The Lord's Prayer in 50 different kinds of shorthand

The Victorian Academy of Arts organised the Fine Arts section which included paintings by Louis Buvelot, Eugene von Guerard, Isaac Whitehead and Henry Leonardus van den Houten.

== Awards ==
The awards given during the exhibition included the Intercolonial Exhibition medal. 648 medals were produced to be awarded to winning exhibitors in various categories. The medal included a latin inscription and was designed by prominent sculptor of the period, Charles Summers.

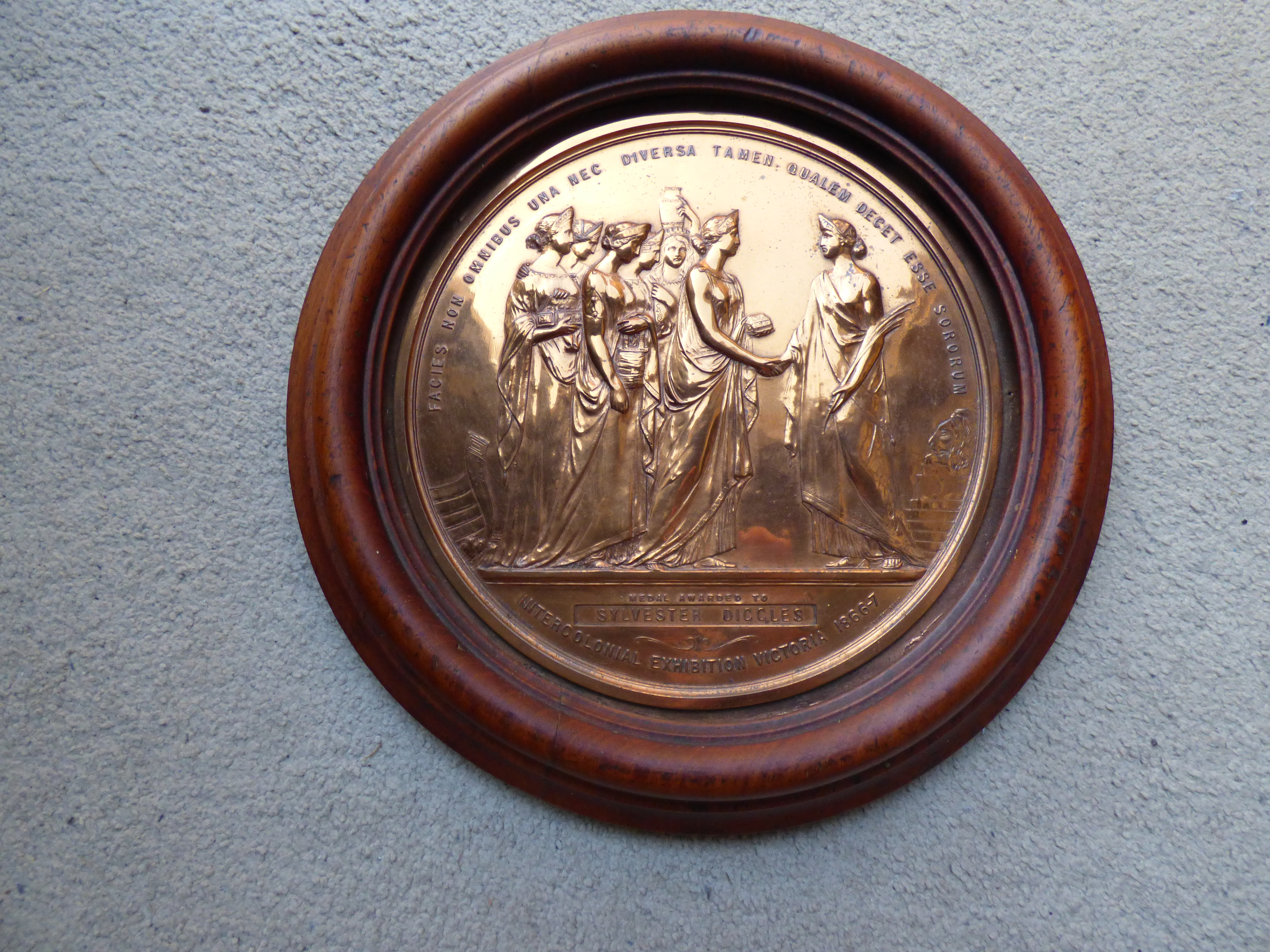
This medal was awarded to Silvester Diggles from Queensland, in the printing category, for the production of The “Ornithology of Australia”. The medal is inscribed with a Latin proverb “Facies non omnibus una, Nec diversa tamen, qualem decet esse sororum”, which translates to “They all look different and yet alike : as sisters would”

== Closing ==
At the closing ceremony at noon on 16 November, Redmond Barry, chairman of the commissioners, addressing the acting governor William Stawell summarised the numbers of exhibitors, visitors and proceeds. He described jury selection and summarised medals awarded. He also thanked the jurors and the trustees of the Public Library and National Museum for the use of their great hall and annexes.
