= Odette Le Fontenay =

French opera singer (1865–1965)

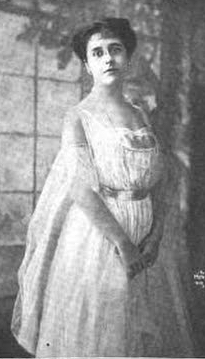
- Le Fontenay in 1917
- Born: Odette Le Flaguais; October 6, 1885; Paris
- Died: November 24, 1965 (aged 80); Broward County, Florida
- Other names: Odette le Fontenay, Odette le F. Coudert
- Occupation: opera singer
- Known for: sang with the Metropolitan Opera (1916–1917)

Odette Le Fontenay (October 6, 1885 – November 24, 1965), born Odette Le Flaguais, was a French soprano opera singer and music educator based in the United States after 1913. She sang with the Metropolitan Opera in its 1916–1917 season.

== Early life and education ==
Odette Le Flaguais was born in Paris and raised in London, the daughter of Louis Adrien Georges Le Flaguais and Félicie McDougald Bouligny. Her parents divorced in 1895. She was a descendant of Spanish Louisiana governor Francisco Bouligny, and her grandfather was congressman John Edward Bouligny. She studied in Italy and Spain, in her youth.

== Career ==
Le Fontenay began her career at Covent Garden in London and with the Opéra-Comique in Paris, before moving to the United States. In 1914 she sang as a soloist with the John Philip Sousa band. In 1916 she sang in Melinda and her Sisters, a "suffrage operetta", with Frances Alda, Emmy Wehlen, Marie Dressler, Marie Doro, and other performers at the Waldorf Astoria's grand ballroom. In the 1916–1917 season, she sang with the Metropolitan Opera in New York, debuting in the same season as soprano Marie Sundelius. She had roles in The Magic Flute, The Marriage of Figaro, and Hansel and Gretel.

She toured across the United States, giving concerts and recitals, after her season with the Metropolitan Opera. A 1921 reviewer said that Le Fontenay gave a "rather unusual and altogether interesting" program and that she "displayed a voice of presentable quality and serviceable vocal equipment". She made recordings for the Edison Records and Victor companies, and even performed "duets" with recordings of her own voice in concerts, as a demonstration of Edison's "re-creation" technology.

Later, in the 1920s, Le Fontenay sang on radio programs, sometimes sharing the program with her husband. After a divorce, she taught voice at the Ethel Walker School in Simsbury, Connecticut, from 1935 to 1943.

== Personal life ==
In 1914, Odette Le Fontenay married fellow opera singer Philippe Gustave Coudert (1879–1944), a baritone, in New York. They had three children (Odette-Corinne, Marie Yolande, and Philippe Jr.) and divorced in 1932. She died in 1965, aged 80 years, in Florida.
