= Australian Navy Cadets =

Youth military organisation of the Royal Australian Navy

- Active: July 1st, 1907 – present
- Country: Australia
- Role: Volunteer youth organisation
- Size: 81 units 2,600 cadets 566 staff
- Part of: Australian Defence Force Cadets
- Headquarters: Directorate ANC, Brindabella Business Park, Canberra
- Mottos: Integrity and Endeavour
- Website: https://www.navycadets.gov.au/

Commanders
- Chief of Navy: VADM Mark Hammond RAN
- Director General ANC: CDRE David Greaves RAN
- Director ANC: CMDR Mark Cohayney RAN
- National Commander ANC: CAPT Richard Morgan ANC

Insignia
- Australian Navy Cadets Ensign (2001–present)

- Naval Reserve Cadets Ensign (1973–2001)

- Australian Sea Cadet Corps Ensign (1956–1973)

- Naval Ensign (1907–1956)

The Australian Navy Cadets (ANC) is a youth development organisation supported by the Royal Australian Navy, with a focus on the maritime domain. The organisation conducts navy-related activities, with key objectives that include building self-confidence and developing teamwork and leadership skills.

The navy cadets, which comprises 81 training ships and with approximately 2,600 cadets nationwide. It is available to all young Australians between the ages of 13 and 17. This youth organisation is related with the Australian Air Force Cadets and Australian Army Cadets, which all come under the Australian Defence Force Cadets.

== History ==
Established in the early 1900s, the organisation received official recognition in 1911, with the passing of the Naval Defence Act. Before 1972, the Royal Australian Navy (RAN) and the Navy League of Australia shared administrative duties for the group, which was then known as the Australian Sea Cadet Corps.

The organisation was renamed the Naval Reserve Cadets, after the navy assumed full control of it in 1974. In 2000, the organisation was renamed "Australian Navy Cadets" following the recommendation of an Australian Government review titled Cadets: The Future.

In November 2024, the Australian Navy Cadets' training ship Mersey was renamed Training Ship Sheean in honour of ordinary Seaman Edward "Teddy" Sheean, VC. The name commemorates Sheean's actions during World War II.

=== Boys' Naval Brigades (Victoria), 1901–1911 ===
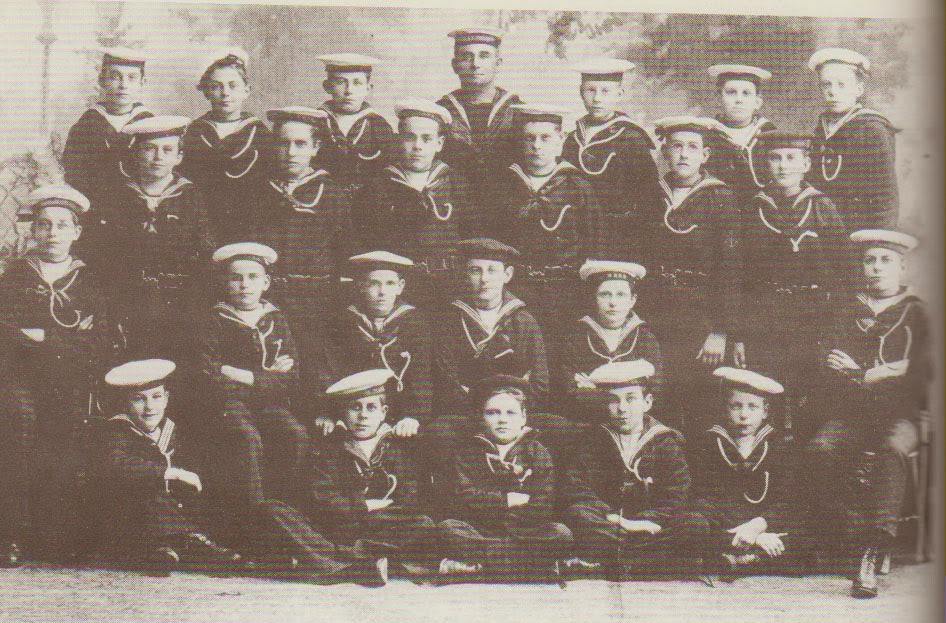
Coburg Boys' Naval Brigade c.1908

The Boys' Naval Brigades were the earliest youth naval organisation in Australia. This organisation was run in conjunction with the Church of England. In 1903, Chief Gunner Robert Kearns of the Victorian Navy pioneered the Boys' Naval Brigade movement, forming the first group near Swan Island, Port Phillip. Soon after, in 1903, the second group was formed in Ballarat. The Boys' Naval Brigade was disbanded in 1913 when the government established compulsory training from 3 June 1913, resulting in its members joining the Navy-led Australian Naval Cadet Corps.

=== Australian Naval Cadet Corps, 1908–1952 ===
In March 1908, recruitment for the Australian Navy's Australian Naval Cadet Corps (ANC) began, with its activities commencing in July that year. The ANC Corps actively operated until 1913, when the Government's Compulsory Training legislation transferred them into the newly created RANR (M) Militia, where they continued training throughout the First World War. After the war, the ANC Corps was re-established, and in 1930, compulsory training of the ANC Corps ceased. Once again in 1940, when the Second World War began, the ANC Corps deferred training as all Naval personnel were needed in the fight. The organisation had resumed its efforts after the war.

=== Navy League Sea Cadet Corps NLSCC, 1921–1952 ===
In 1921, a second private Sea Cadet body was formed following the formation of the third Navy League Branch in New South Wales. This NSW Branch established the Navy League Sea Cadet Corps (NLSCC) for young boys. The NLSCC operated in parallel with the ANC Corps, which was re-established after the war. During the 1920s, the NLSCC expanded, with other states forming Navy League branches along with their own Navy League Sea Cadet units.

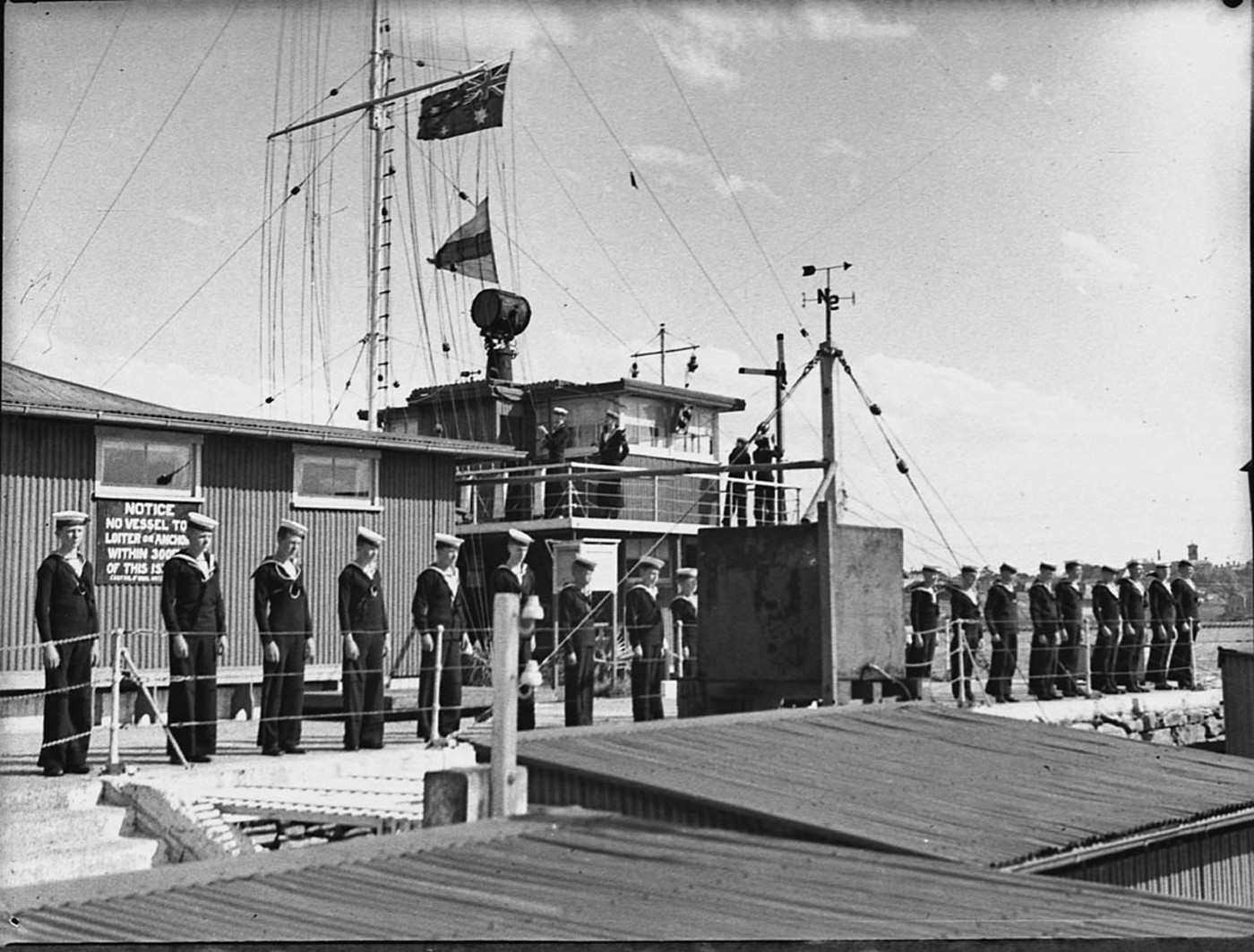
Navy League Sea Cadets at Snapper Island c.1937

Unlike the ANC Corps, which had halted operations during the Second World War, the private NLSCC remained operational but was reduced in units as many volunteer trainers had enlisted to serve in the war. The Royal Australian Navy recognised the NLSCC's efforts, which, up until now, operated with no assistance from the Navy. Negotiations commenced with the Navy League regarding future support; however, as the Australian Navy League was a branch of the United Kingdom's Navy League, this was possible, to resolve this problem, all branches of the Australian Defence Force were merged into the Australian Body, the Navy League of Australia, renaming its cadets the Australian Sea Cadet Corps.

=== Royal Australian Naval Reserve Cadets (RANRC), 1950–1973 ===
The RANRC ran alongside the Australian Sea Cadet Corps. The program was small compared to its counterpart, with roughly 300 cadets involved within the program.

=== Australian Navy Sea Cadet Corps (ANSCC), 1950–1973 ===
The Australian Sea Cadet Corps, now supported by the Navy, expanded rapidly under the leadership of its volunteer ex-service trainers. By 1970 the organisation had reached 2,500 cadets. The Royal Australian Navy expressed concerns about the increasing number of cadets and the cost of maintaining them. ASCC took responsibility for the cost, and by late 1974 the group had 2,000 members.

Representatives from the Navy League and the RAN discussed their shared concerns in 1972 on the rising costs of managing and sustaining the ANSCC program. Eventually, the RAN and Navy League decided that the Navy would be solely in charge of training the 2,000-strong ANSCC and 300-strong ANC. Under the new Defence law, the ANC and the ANSCC cadets united into the newly formed Naval Reserve Cadets (NRC). The Navy League was given time to restructure its ANSCC in the event that the Navy decided to stop training cadets, under an agreement with the Australian Commonwealth Naval Board (ACNB). The ANSCC members of the Navy League were transferred into the new Naval Reserve Cadets (NRC) of the RAN in January 1973.

=== Naval Reserve Cadets NRC, 1973–2000 ===
Problems arose early in the newly formed Naval Reserve Cadets when the 21st Prime Minister of Australia, Gough Whitlam, cancelled all cadet activities and withdrew ADF support for cadets in 1975. The Navy League's agreement with the Australian Commonwealth Naval Board was honoured by the government, which notified the Navy League and allowed for the reorganisation of the ASCC structure. By the end of 1975, the Whitlam government was voted out, and Malcolm Fraser was elected the 22nd Prime Minister of Australia. The cadet situation was reviewed, and the Fraser government reinstated cadet training. In 2002, the name was changed back to Australian Naval Cadets—the original name of the 1907 Australian Navy Cadet Corps.

== Duelling Movements ==
According to Australian rear admiral Frans Karel de Laat, from 1863 to 1952, young seamanship was fostered by two stands of the movement: a citizenship Sea Cadet movement, and a Navy-led, reservist-led organisation. Both strands under various bodies competed for the same resources and generally sought the same goal - that of preparing young people for naval service. The disparate schemes were understandable pre-federation due to the fractured nature of colonial government. Post-federation, the duel strands were locked in circular arguments over similar aims for competing resources. The presence of community-based naval organisations, while little threat to the Navy's resources, was at times perceived as a risk to the Navy's reputation.

== Aims ==
=== Training ===
The Australian Navy Cadets provides nautical training that involves primarily water-based activities navigation, communications, first aid, drill, maritime history, and firearms proficiency are among the skills taught. Within its program, the ANC attempts to offer the following:

- develop an interest in the Navy, its tradition and moral values,
- encourage cadets to continue military or community service,
- give cadets a foundation of military knowledge and discipline,
- develop the qualities of leadership, self-discipline, self-reliance, and initiative, and
- provide training that may later assist in achieving competencies required during Navy induction training.

=== Purpose ===
Australian Navy Cadets is a youth personal development program conducted by the Australian Navy in collaboration with the community. Its goal is to develop the individual, the community, and the Australian Navy in order to benefit the nation.

=== Values ===
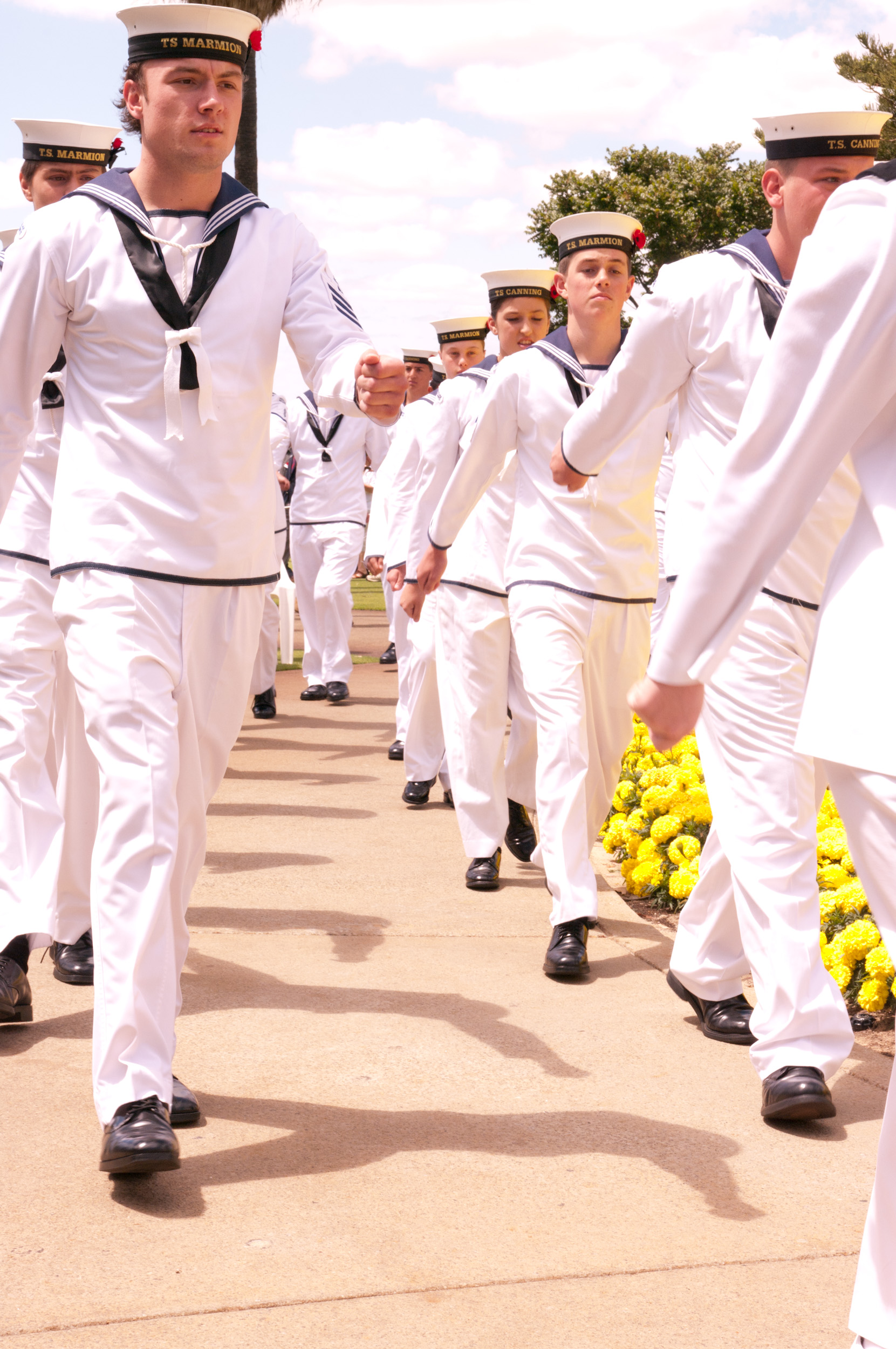
Remembrance Day ceremony Kings Park, Western Australia November 11, 2012.

The Australian Navy Cadets adopt the values of the Australian Navy (Service, Courage, Respect, Integrity, and Excellence) to empower youth to achieve their potential.

== Structure ==
The organisational structure of the ANC is based on three hierarchical levels: national, flotilla, and training ship.

The country (Australia) is split into regions, and the regions have flotillas, which have several training ship units. Inside the training ships are Staff and Cadets, who take on positions to run the training ship accordingly every parade night or weekend camp.

=== National commanders and directors general ===
The basic naval reserve cadet (NRC) command structure prior to 2001 was:

Director of Naval Reserves and Cadets (DNRC) was a RANR Officer in Canberra who had overall authority of the Naval Reserve Cadets. Each state had a Senior Officer Naval Reserve Cadets (SONRC) who answered to the LNA or Local Naval Authority usually the Commanding Officer (CO) of the establishment on which the NRCHQ of that state resided. A Cadet Liaison Officer (CLO), usually a RANR Officer, was situated in HMAS Cairns, HMAS Moreton, HMAS Watson, HMAS Lonsdale, HMAS Encounter, HMAS Huon and HMAS Leeuwin (all shore bases at the time). The CLO had responsibility for the liaising between the NRC and RAN in their state. There was no national HQ or national staff until the ANC was established in 2000.

| Rank | Name | Post-nominals | Branch | Tenure |
Director NRC
| Captain | David Martin | | RAN | 1973–1974 |
| Commander | Allan Vidler | | NRC | |
| Commander | Christine Reinks | | NRC | |
National Commander ANC
| Captain | Gavin Reeves | | ANC | November 1999 – 25 February 2007 |
| Commander | John Goss | AM | RANR | 25 February 2007 – 13 August 2008 (Acting) |
| Captain | Eliot Fisher | ESM | ANC | 13 August 2008 – 13 August 2011 |
| Captain | John Gill | | ANC | 13 August 2011 – 30 June 2014 |
| Captain | Eliot Fisher | ESM, OAM | ANC | 13 August 2014 – 1 January 2017 |
| Captain | Kerry Rayner | OAM | ANC | 1 January 2017 – 1 January 2020 |
| Captain | Martin Blume | | ANC | 1 January 2020 – December 2022 |
| Captain | Peter Alderson | | ANC | 1 January 2023 – December 2025 |
| Captain | Richard Morgan | | ANC | 1 January 2026 - Present |

Prior to 2000 the ANC did not have the title or position 'Director General ANC', instead the overall Commander's position was called 'Director of Reserves Navy' which was a RAN – RANR position.

| Rank | Name | Post-Nominals | Branch | Tenure |
Director General ANC
| Commodore | Nigel Coates | AM | RAN | 2005–2007 |
| Commodore | Karel de Laat | CSC, RFD | RANR | 2007-2007 |
| Commodore | Michael Smith | AM | RANR | 2007–? |
| Commodore | Geoff Geraghty | AM | RANR | ? – 1 February 2014 |
Director General Australian Navy Cadets and Reserves
| Commodore | Geoff Geraghty | AM | RANR | 2 February 2014 – 30 November 2014 |
| Commodore | Bruce Kafer | AM, CSC | RANR | 1 December 2014 – 9 March 2017 |
| Commodore | Mark Hill | CSC | RAN | 10 March 2017 – May 2019 |
| Commodore | David Greaves | | RAN | May 2019 – July 2026 |
| Commodore | John Stavridis | | RAN | July 2026 – Present |

==== Director General Australian Navy Cadets ====
The position of Director General Australian Navy Cadets (DGANC) is responsible to CN, through the Deputy Chief of Navy (DCN), and to CJC, through the Head of Joint Services Support Division, for the following responsibilities:

- Delivery of a strategically based, productive, and cohesive ANC program designed to enhance the cadet experience and encourage greater youth participation in the ANC
- Provision of specialist advice to the RAN and JSSD on matters relating to ANC organisational structures, policy, governance, personnel, administrative procedures, training of personnel, safety management and oversight of ANC resources
- Liaison with the Defence organisation and other external agencies.
- Ensuring ANC policies, procedures, and practices align with the DYSF
- Conducting annual reviews of youth-facing positions and WWCC positions within DGANC and provide any updates to DNWM for annotation in PMKeyS.
- DGANC chairs the ANC Senior Leadership Group (ANCSLG) and the ANC CadetSafe Board.

The current DGANC (of July 2024) is CDRE David Greaves, RAN.

==== Director Australian Navy Cadets ====
The position of Director Australian Navy Cadets (DANC) is responsible for the day-to-day management of the ANC Directorate, including the management of all RAN and Australian Public Service (APS) staff allocated to the ANC Directorate.

DANC through DGANC is responsible for:

- provision of timely advice to the RAN and Government on ANC issues of representation, policy, resources, safety, and reputation management
- management and governance of Commonwealth financial resources allocated for ANC support IAW the Public Governance, Performance and Accountability Act 2013 (PGPA Act)
- command liaison with Defence and other external agencies
- ANC policy coordination and promulgation.

The current DANC (as of July 2024) is CMDR Mark Cohayney, RAN.

==== National Commander Australian Navy Cadets (NCANC) ====
The position of National Commander Australian Navy Cadets (NCANC) is responsible through the DGANC, to CN and HJSSD for the following:

- the safe and effective delivery of the ANC youth program IAW the guidance provided by the DYSF and supporting documentation
- for the management of international relationships between the ANC and members of the International Sea Cadets Association (ISCA)
- for the recruitment, effective leadership and management of ANC members in accordance CN direction and the supporting guidance provided within Youth Policy Manual (YOUTHPOLMAN) Parts 1 and 2, the YOUTH HQ website, and this publication

The current NCANC (as of July 2024) is CAPT Peter Alderson, ANC.

=== Flotilla ===
Flotillas are groups of training ships (TS), each commanded by a Flotilla Commander (FLOTCOM), and supported by a small flotilla HQ staff of Unit Support Officers (USO). Flotillas draw support from the Functional Directorate staff within National ANC HQ and Director Flotillas (DFLOT) personnel.

The current flotillas and their Flotilla Commanders (as of July 2024) are:

| Flotilla Name | Flotilla Commander | Motto |
|---|---|---|
| Attack Flotilla | LCDR Lara Rice, ANC | "Force in the North" |
| Daring Flotilla | LCDR Chris Moyle, ANC | "We Stand As One" |
| Kellatie Flotilla | LCDR Michelle Montgomery, ANC | "To Serve" |
| Lonsdale Flotilla | LCDR Kathie Murphy, ANC | "Wisdom Is Strength" |
| Moreton Flotilla | LCDR AJ Hughes, ANC | "Strong And Steady" |
| Taipan Flotilla | LCDR Matt Neville, ANC | "Swift And Sure" |
| Torrens Flotilla | LCDR Pieter Scott, ANC | "Faith And Fortitude" |
| Waratah Flotilla | LCDR Sharon Frank, ANC | "Advance Together" |
| Westralia Flotilla | CMDR Spike Jones, ANC | "Faithful And Bold" |
| Gallipoli Flotilla | LCDR Max Condon, ANC | "The Fighting Spirit" |

=== Training ship ===
Training ships operate throughout many locations in Australia and are attached to a flotilla among other TS units. Each TS is commanded by a Commanding Officer (CO) who holds the rank of LEUT. The CO is often supported by an Executive Officer (XO) who holds the rank of SBLT. Some training ships also have Training Officers (TO) and a Whole Ship's Coordinator (WSC). The number of adult members and cadets can vary considerably, dependent on local circumstances.

Most training ships have a division(s). A division is a group of cadets, normally led by a senior cadet such as a CDTPO or CDTCPO.

The current training ships (as of July 2024) are:

==== Attack Flotilla ====
| Unit name | Unit motto |
|---|---|
| TS Carpentaria | "Can Do Will Do" |
| TS Coral Sea | "Second To None" |
| TS Endeavour | "Search And Learn" |
| TS Pioneer | "Prepare The Way" |
| TS Rockhampton | "Ever Onward" |

==== Daring Flotilla ====
| Unit name | Unit motto |
|---|---|
| TS Bundaberg | "Push The Boundaries" |
| TS Centaur | "Swiftly Fierce" |
| TS Gympie | "Toil Hard" |
| TS Gladstone | "Strive For A Better Future" |
| TS Koopa | "Never Waver" |
| TS Krait | "With Skill And Courage" |
| TS Maryborough | "Work In Unison" |
| TS Onslow | "Seeking Knowledge" |

==== Kellatie Flotilla ====
| Unit name | Unit motto |
|---|---|
| TS Argonaut | "Ready To Dare" |
| TS Derwent | "Swift And Strong" |
| TS Emu | "Training To Lead" |
| TS Hobart | "Grow With Strength" |
| TS Mersey | "Fight On" |
| TS Tamar | "Fearless And Ferocious" |
| TS York | "Good Hope" |

==== Lonsdale Flotilla ====
| Unit name | Unit motto |
|---|---|
| TS Albury | "Avail Achieve Advance" |
| TS Barwon | "No Victory Without Honour" |
| TS Bataan | "With Talons And Beak" |
| TS Bendigo | "Advance With Purpose" |
| TS Henty | "With Pride We Serve" |
| TS Latrobe | "Bear And Forebear" |
| TS Melbourne | "Vires Acquirit Eundo" |
| TS Mildura | "Look Ahead" |
| TS Tingira | "Learn And Excel" |
| TS Voyager | "Where Destiny Calls" |

==== Moreton Flotilla ====
| Unit name | Unit motto |
|---|---|
| TS Brisbane | "Aim At Higher Things" |
| TS Diamantina | "Protecting The Future" |
| TS Gayundah | "Knowledge Is Strength" |
| TS Magnus | "Alis Aquilae" |
| TS Moreton Bay | "Willing To Try" |
| TS Norfolk | "Lead By Example" |
| TS Paluma | "Search And Serve" |
| TS Vengeance | "Perceive To Achieve" |

==== Taipan Flotilla ====
| Unit name | Unit motto |
|---|---|
| TS Armidale | "Stand Firm" |
| TS Culgoa | "Forward Without Fear" |
| TS Hawkesbury | "Quality Not Servitude" |
| TS Lismore | "Vigour Is Life" |
| TS Manoora | "Against All Odds" |
| TS Rushcutter | "Effort Reaps Reward" |
| TS Shropshire | "Strive And Flourish" |
| TS Tobruk | "Faithful And Strong" |
| TS Vendetta | "Knowledge Is Strength" |

==== Torrens Flotilla ====
| Unit name | Unit motto |
|---|---|
| TS Adelaide | "Training For The Future" |
| TS Augusta | "Proudly Sailing Forward" |
| TS Darwin | "Succeed With Pride" |
| TS Flinders | "Investigate And Explore" |
| TS Noarlunga | "No Risk No Win" |
| TS Stuart | "Always Prepared" |
| TS Whyalla | "Sail Ahead" |

==== Waratah Flotilla ====
| Unit name | Unit motto |
|---|---|
| TS Albatross | "Watch Me Soar" |
| TS Australia | "Endeavour" |
| TS Canberra | "For King And Country" |
| TS Jervis Bay | "Strive Valiantly" |
| TS Kanimbla | "Cry Havoc" |
| TS Nepean | "Anchored In Success" |
| TS Orion | "Orbe Circumcincto" |
| TS Shoalhaven | "Follow Heavens Light" |
| TS Sirius | "Heavens Light Our Guide" |
| NTS Supply | "Strengthen The Shield" |
| TS Sydney | "Thorough And Ready" |

==== Westralia Flotilla ====
| Unit name | Unit motto |
|---|---|
| TS Anzac | "Second To None" |
| TS Broome | "Knowledge Is The Pearl" |
| TS Bunbury | "Nothing Without Toil" |
| TS Canning | "Above All Service" |
| TS Comet | "Seek Excellence" |
| TS Kybra | "As One" |
| TS Mandurah | "Unity Is Strength" |
| TS Marmion | "Guided By Strength" |
| TS Morrow | "Always Ready" |
| TS Perth | "Learn And Flourish" |
| TS Vancouver | "Excellence By Effort" |

==== Gallipoli Flotilla ====
| Unit name | Unit motto |
|---|---|
| TS Ipswich | "Dare To Defy" |
| TS Kookaburra | "Alert" |
| TS Oxley | "Steadfast And Strong" |
| TS Southport | "Leading Through Service" |
| TS Toowoomba | "Fearless" |
| TS Tyalgum | "Unity Harmony Strength" |
| TS Vampire | "Let Us Be Daring" |
| TS Walrus | "Ever Onward And Upward" |

== Activities and training ==
=== Cadet Youth Development Continuum (CYDC) ===
The Cadet Youth Development Continuum acts as a framework that guides the cadet development program. The program aims to develop a cadet's personal qualities and life skills: resilience, teamwork, confidence, loyalty, respect, and a sense of service to others.

==== Category Program ====
The ANC offers three categories, which are aligned with the RAN and its many roles. These categories are Maritime Engineering, Maritime Operations, and Maritime Support. Cadets who reach the rank of Able Seaman are expected to have completed one of these categories. Category badges are awarded on completion of the category's workbook.

===== Maritime Engineering =====
The Maritime Engineering category develops cadets in the basic principles of engineering in the maritime environment. A cadet will gain an appreciation of the mechanical and electrical systems used in watercraft and in larger naval vessels.

===== Maritime Operations =====
The Maritime Operations category develops cadets with an interest and ability in seamanship and general mariner skills.

===== Maritime Support =====
The Maritime Support category develops cadets with an interest in support functions, including medical, catering, hospitality, supply chain, stores, and administration functions.

==== Elective Program ====
Electives are optional courses that give cadets the chance to specialise in one or more areas of interest and advance their present level of ability. A cadet will typically select an elective that piques their interest or is in line with the ANC category they have selected.

The electives offered in the ANC consist of:

- Cooking
- First Aid
- Musician
- Physical Fitness and Well-being
- Powerboating
- Sailing
- Skill at Arms
- Bridge Operations
- Drone flying
- Robotics

Cadets of all ranks are given the option to choose as many of these courses as they wish. On completion, elective badges are awarded. Elective badges have three levels: Bronze, Silver, and Gold.

These elective badges are velcroed onto a black brassard worn on the DPNU. Cadets can sew on a maximum of three badges onto the cuff of their right arm for the ceremonial uniform (S3/W3).

==== Promotion ====
Every ANC rank has a workbook that provides cadets with the knowledge and abilities required to advance to the next rank.

Promotion to ranks of Cadet Seaman and Cadet Able Seaman only requires the completion of the core Skills Development Package (SDP) and the promotional checklist, the checklist includes skills ranging from drill to general unit activities. The only exception for this is that promotion to Cadet Able Seaman also requires completion of a category SDP being either Maritime Engineering, Maritime Operations, and Maritime Support.

Promotion to ranks of Cadets Leading Seaman and above requires a promotional board which is held at a unit level for promotion to Cadet Leading Seaman, Flotilla level for Cadet Petty Officers and a National level for Chief Petty Officers and Cadet Warrant Officers.

=== International activities ===
Australian Navy Cadets are members of the ISCA and have the chance to participate in the ANC International exchange program.

The program happens multiple times a year, and cadets are able to experience similar organisations in other select countries:

- Canada
- New Zealand
- United Kingdom
- United States of America
- South Korea

The main goals of the Cadet exchanges are to spread friendships, kindness, pleasure, cultural experiences, and knowledge about new places and the operations of other Cadet organisations.

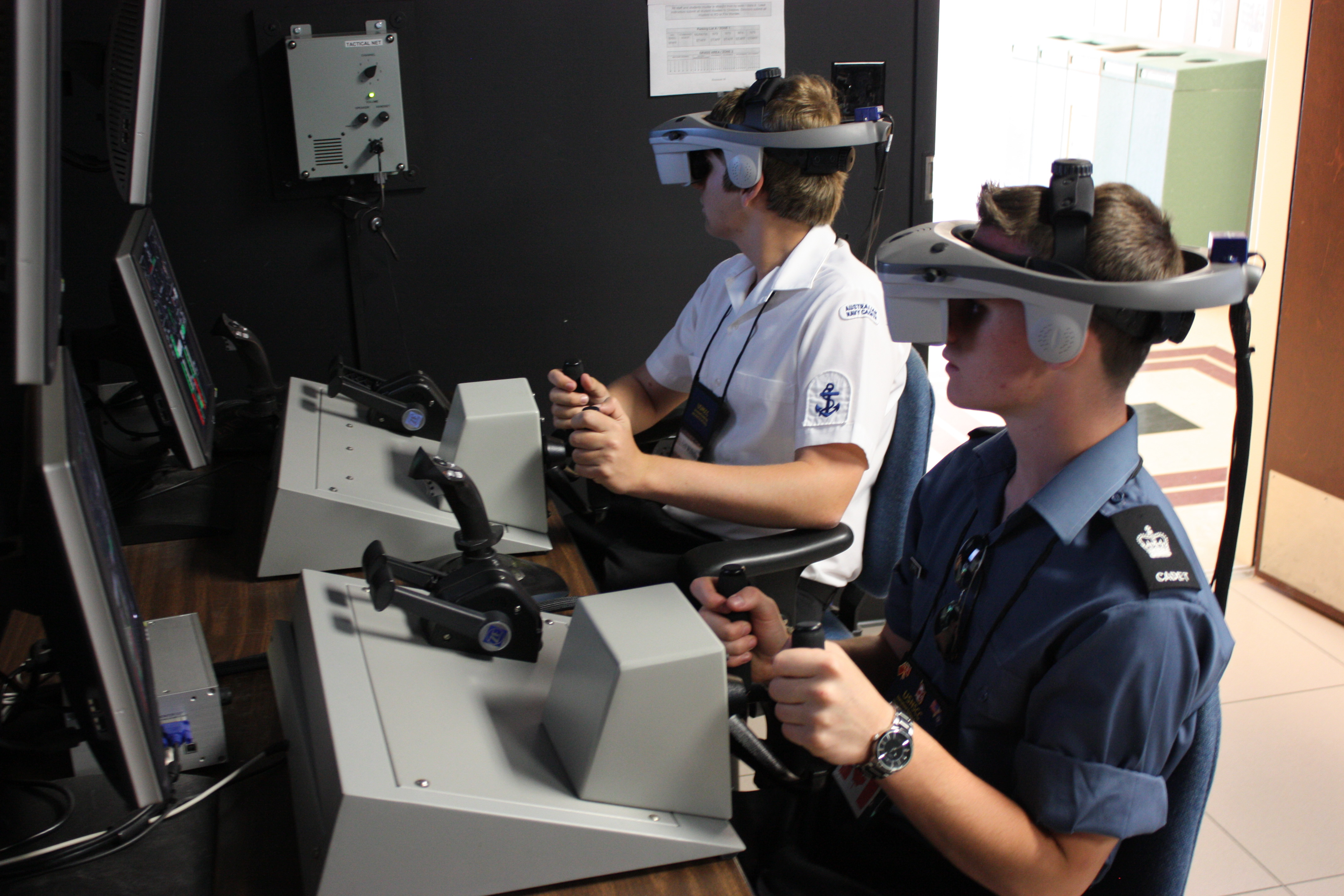
International sea exchange cadets from Australia (left) and Canada (right) in the USA.

=== National activities ===
National activities are fully funded by the Defence who arrange the activities, land and air travel, accommodation, and food.

==== Annual National Camp ====
Cadets are given the opportunity to attend a week-long National Camp at a RAN Shore Establishment such as HMAS Cerberus.

Activities that may be included on a national camp are:

- Visit a Navy warship or submarine
- Fire-fighting and smoke walk
- Target shooting
- Survival at Sea
- Leadership & teamwork challenges
- Rock wall climbing
- Navy helicopter flights
- Drone flying
- Power boating
- Sail training
- Defence careers presentation

==== Annual National Competitions ====
A national regatta and shooting competition is hosted every year for cadets across Australia. The teams from each Cadet Unit compete in these events to test their abilities and training. These tournaments evaluate the abilities and activities that the Navy Cadets learn during the year.

=== Flotilla and unit activities ===
Flotilla and unit-based activities are among the more basic and frequent events in the Australian Navy Cadet program. Flotillas can offer a variety of events for cadets in any of the training ships situated in their flotilla. Training ships are also able to host their own activities solely for cadets inside their unit. A training ship will always host a 'Parade Night' once a week on a select day. The schedule of a parade night can vary from TS to TS but will normally have a Colours Ceremony (raising of the flag), Drill Training, Lessons, Action Based Learning (ABLs), Stand Easy (a time to eat), and a Sunset Ceremony (lowering of the flag).

==== Powerboating ====
The Australian Navy Cadets teaches the skills required to operate small powerboats safely, including weather awareness, basic navigation, and seamanship knowledge.

==== Sailing ====
Several opportunities and experiences related to sailing are offered by the Australian Navy Cadets. Cadets can learn to sail at their unit, take part in sailing weekends at one of the Maritime Training Centers, operate a dinghy, and compete against other cadets in regattas.

The Australian Navy Cadets is an authorised Discover Sailing Center under the Australian Sailing Organisation.

==== Firearm training ====
The ANC offers a comprehensive firearms safety training program using .22 calibre rifles (Bruno CZ452). Cadets learn how to handle a rifle safely before participating in a 'live fire' at a rifle range.

== Ranks and uniforms ==
The uniforms of the Australian Navy Cadets are based on those of the Royal Australian Navy (RAN), with only a few differences between the two. Unlike the RAN, the ANC's shoulder flashes and SRIs (Soft Rank Insignia) read "AUSTRALIAN NAVY CADETS" in place of the RAN's "AUSTRALIA." Another significant difference is in the officer insignia. Staff of the ANC display wavy laces, while RAN officers have straight laces. This difference originates from the Royal Australian Naval Volunteer Reserve. CDTPOs and above are not authorised to wear the Senior Sailor style of uniform that the Royal Australian Navy possesses for various reasons, instead conforming to the Junior Sailor's uniform.

=== Uniforms ===
==== Staff ====
| Uniform Number | Photo | Occasion |
|---|---|---|
| S3 | | Formal events such as Anzac Day (Summer dress) |
| W3 | | Formal events such as Anzac Day (Winter dress) |
| W6 | | Semi formal events in winter |
| S7 | | Semi formal events in summer |
| W12 | | Working rig in winter |
| S12 | | Working rig in summer |

==== Cadets ====
| Uniform Number | Photo | Occasion |
|---|---|---|
| S3 | | Formal events such as Anzac Day (Summer dress) |
| W3 | | Formal events such as Anzac Day (Winter dress) |
| W6 | | Semi formal events in winter |
| S7 | | Semi formal events in summer |
| W12 | | Working rig in winter |
| S12 | | Working rig in summer |

=== Ranks ===
==== Staff ranks ====
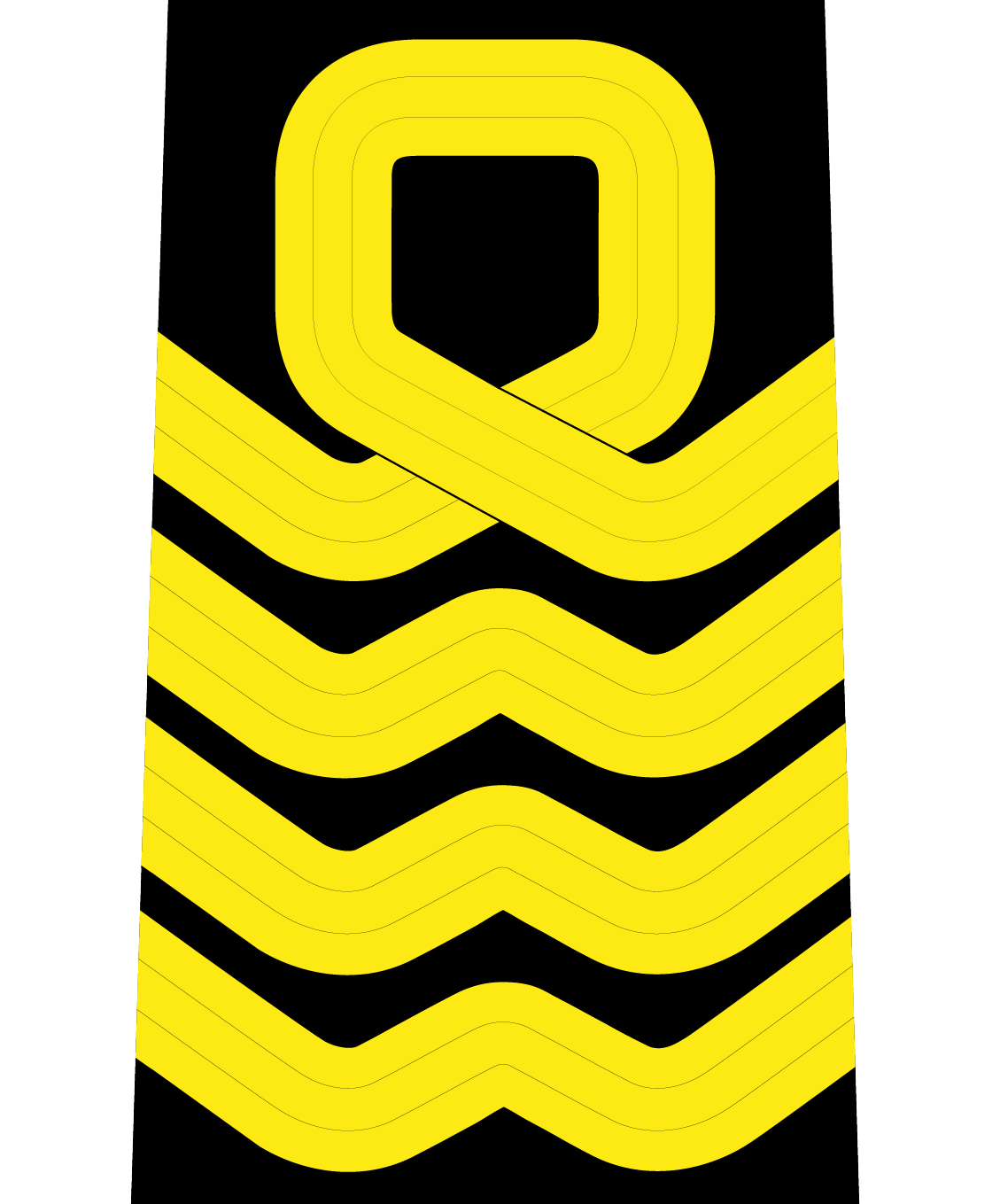
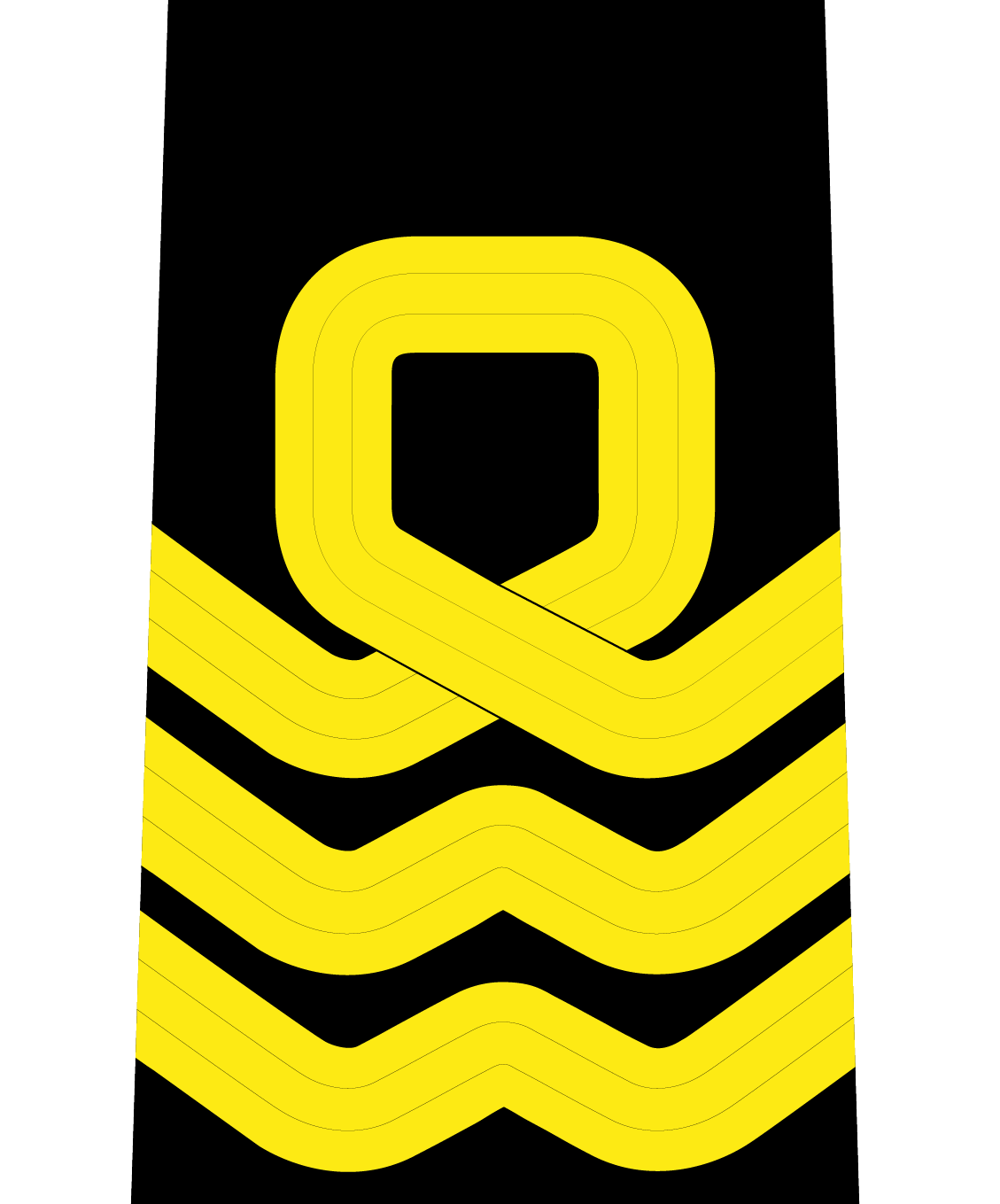
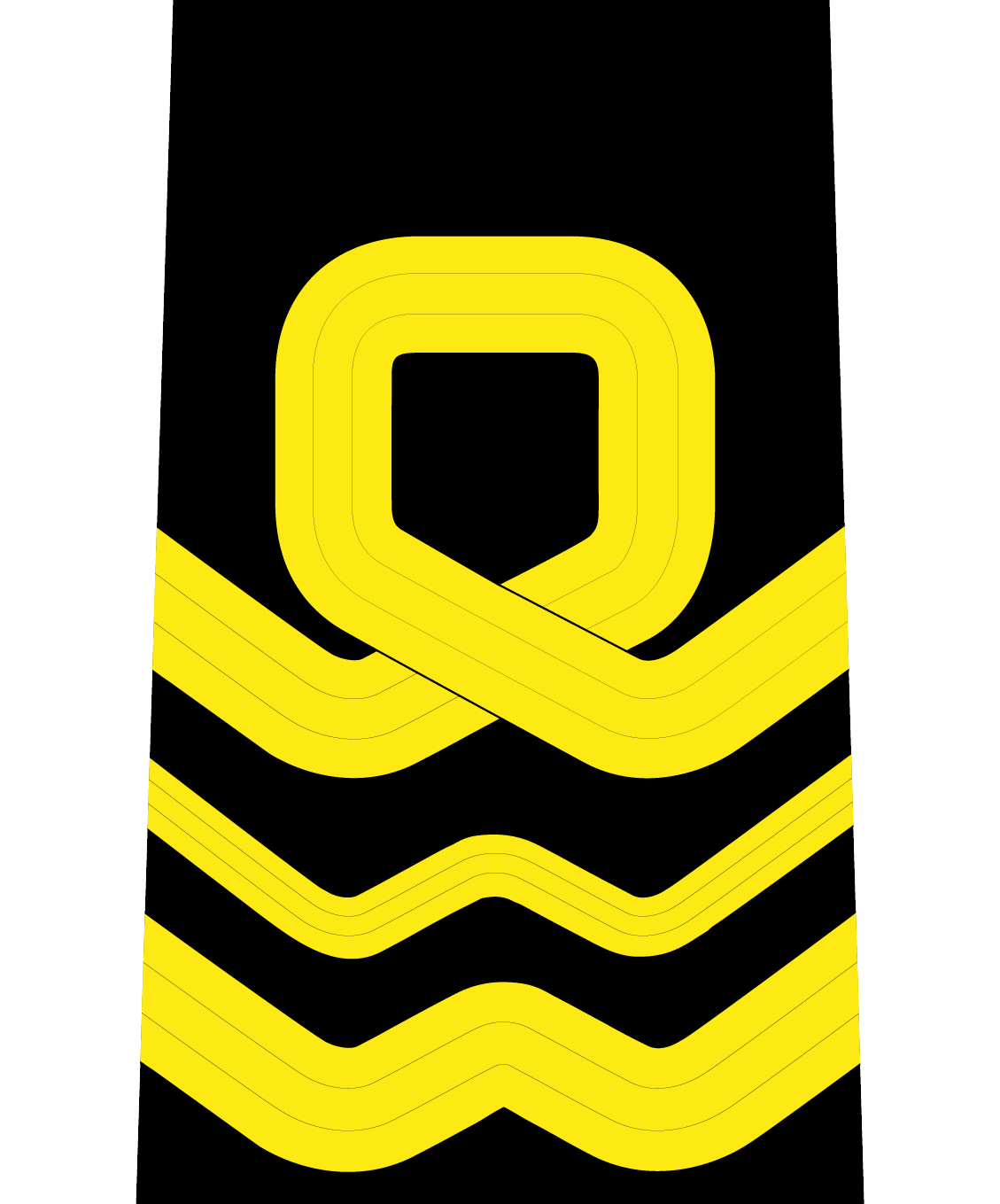
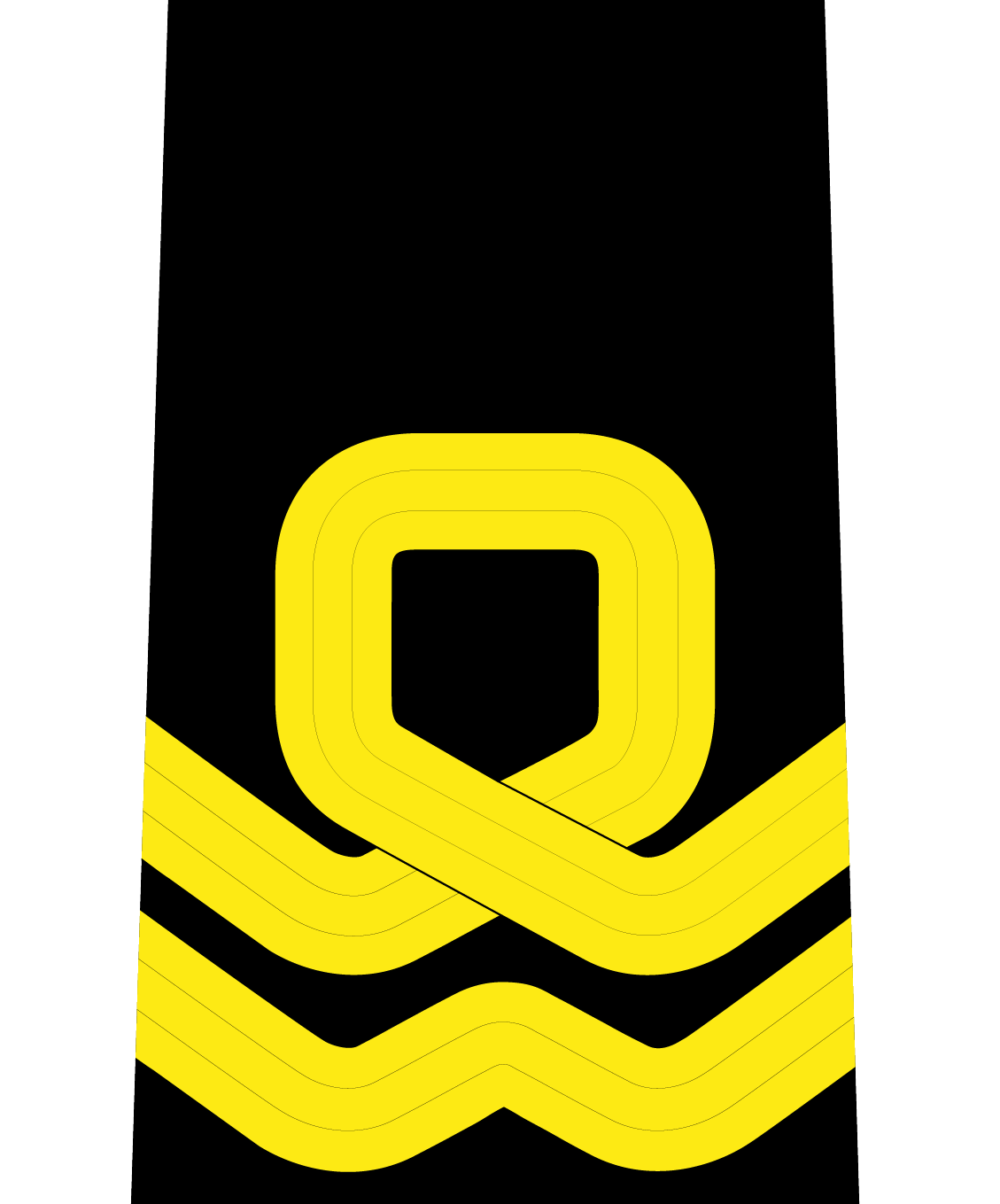
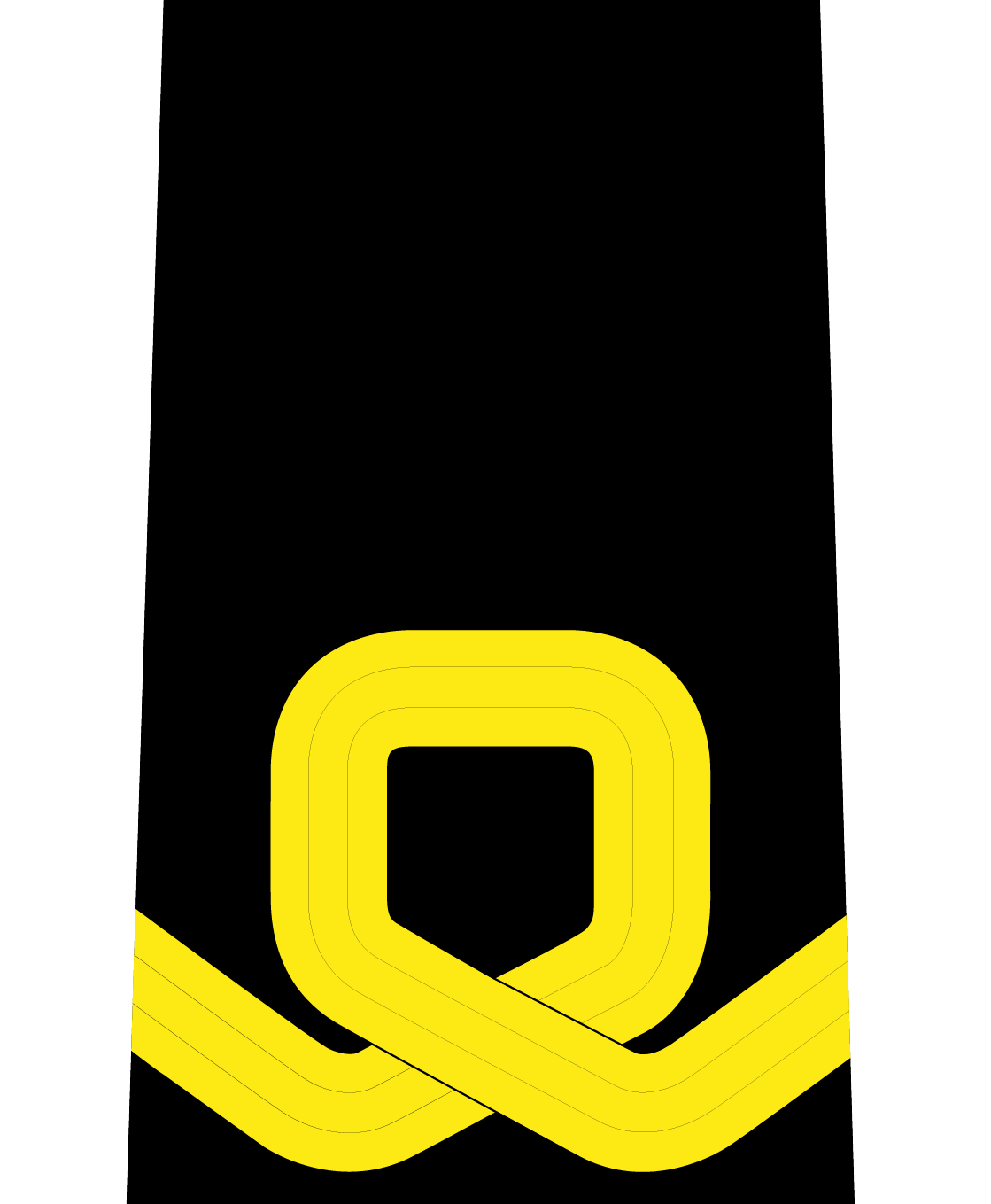
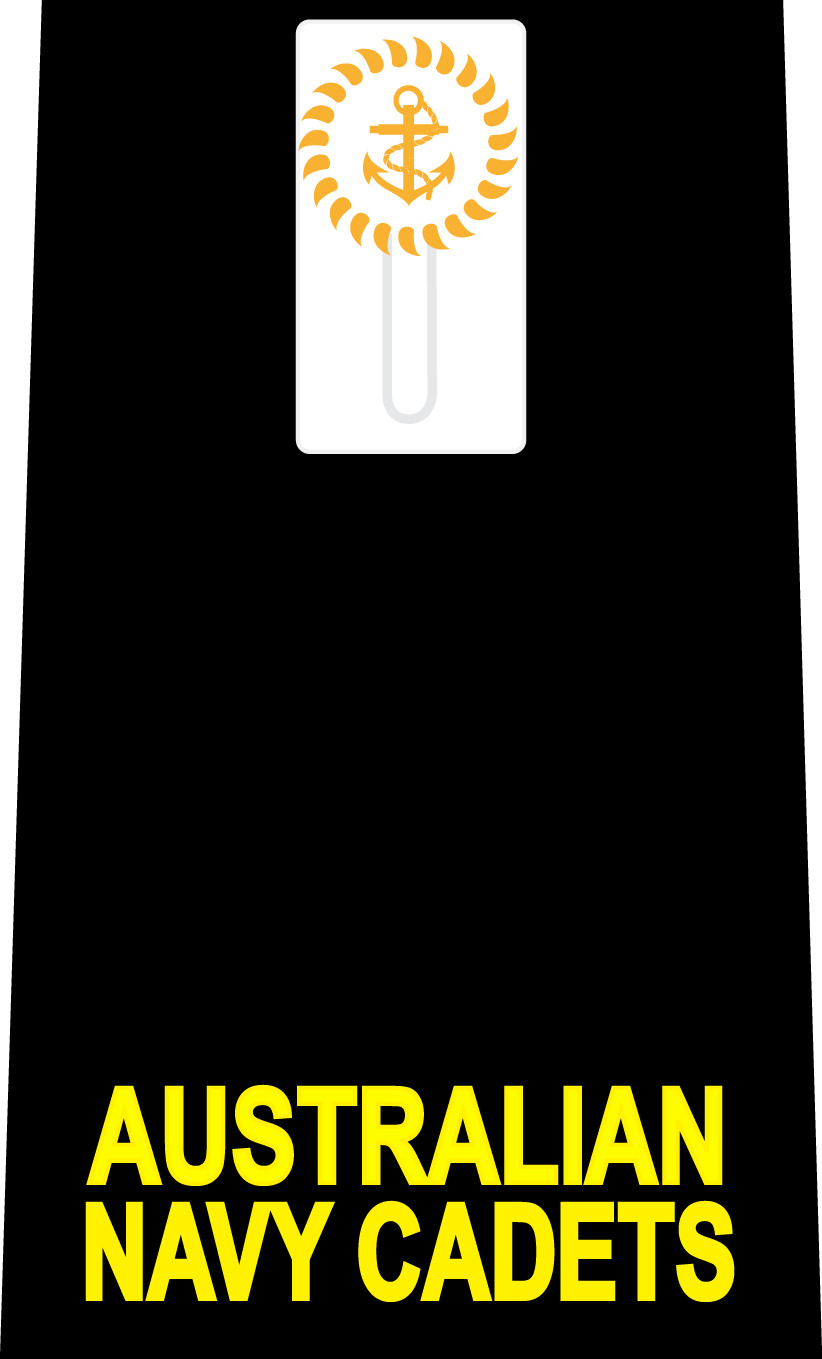
| ADFC Cadets | OOC 6 | OOC 5 | OOC 4 | OOC 3 | OOC 2 | OOC 1 |
|---|---|---|---|---|---|---|
| Australian Navy Cadet Staff Insignia |
| Rank title: | Captain ANC | Commander ANC | Lieutenant Commander ANC | Lieutenant ANC | Sub Lieutenant ANC | Midshipman ANC |
| Abbreviation: | CAPT, ANC | CMDR, ANC | LCDR, ANC | LEUT, ANC | SBLT, ANC | MIDN, ANC |

Example of use; LCDR Robert Rooney, ANC

==== Cadet ranks ====
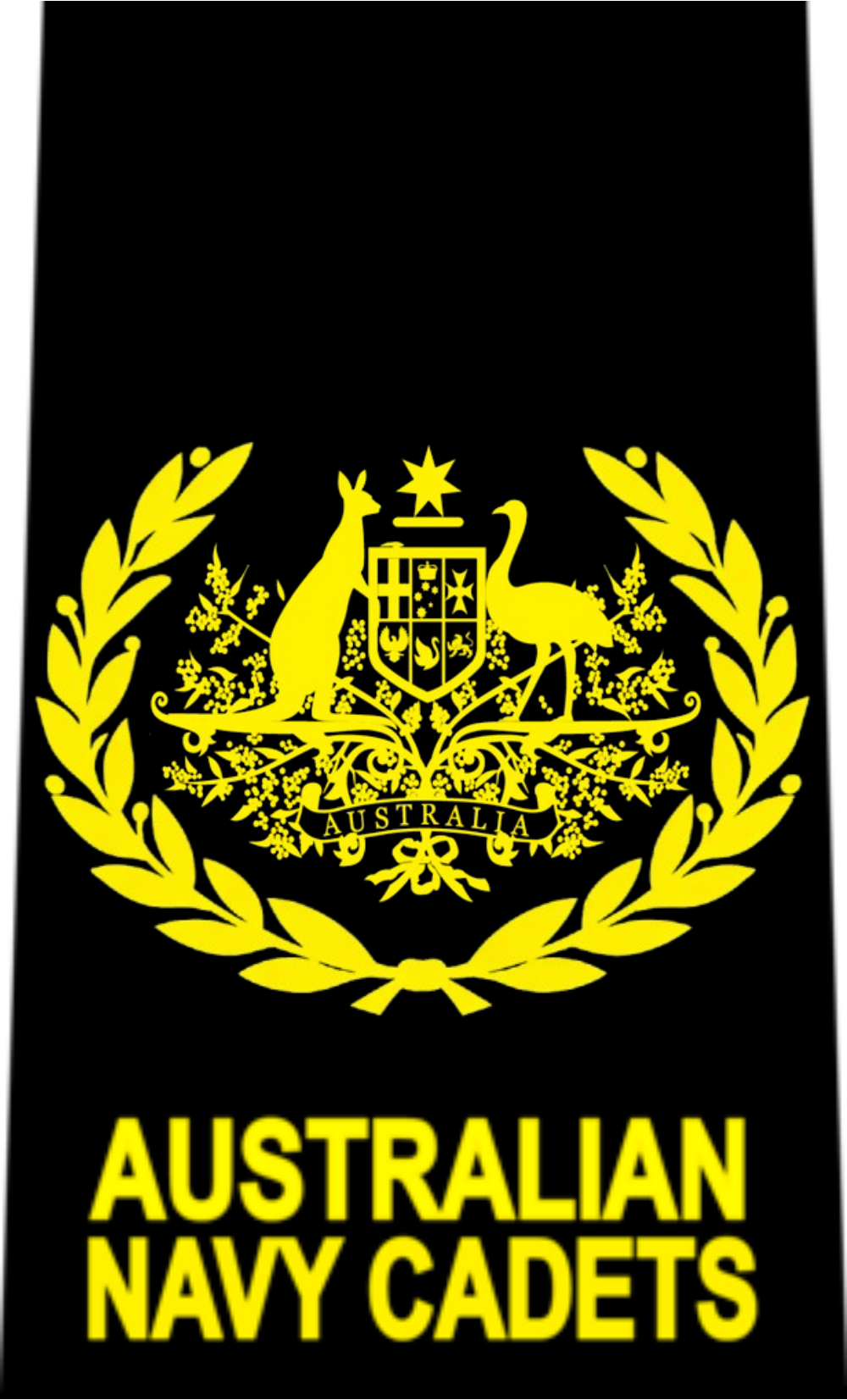
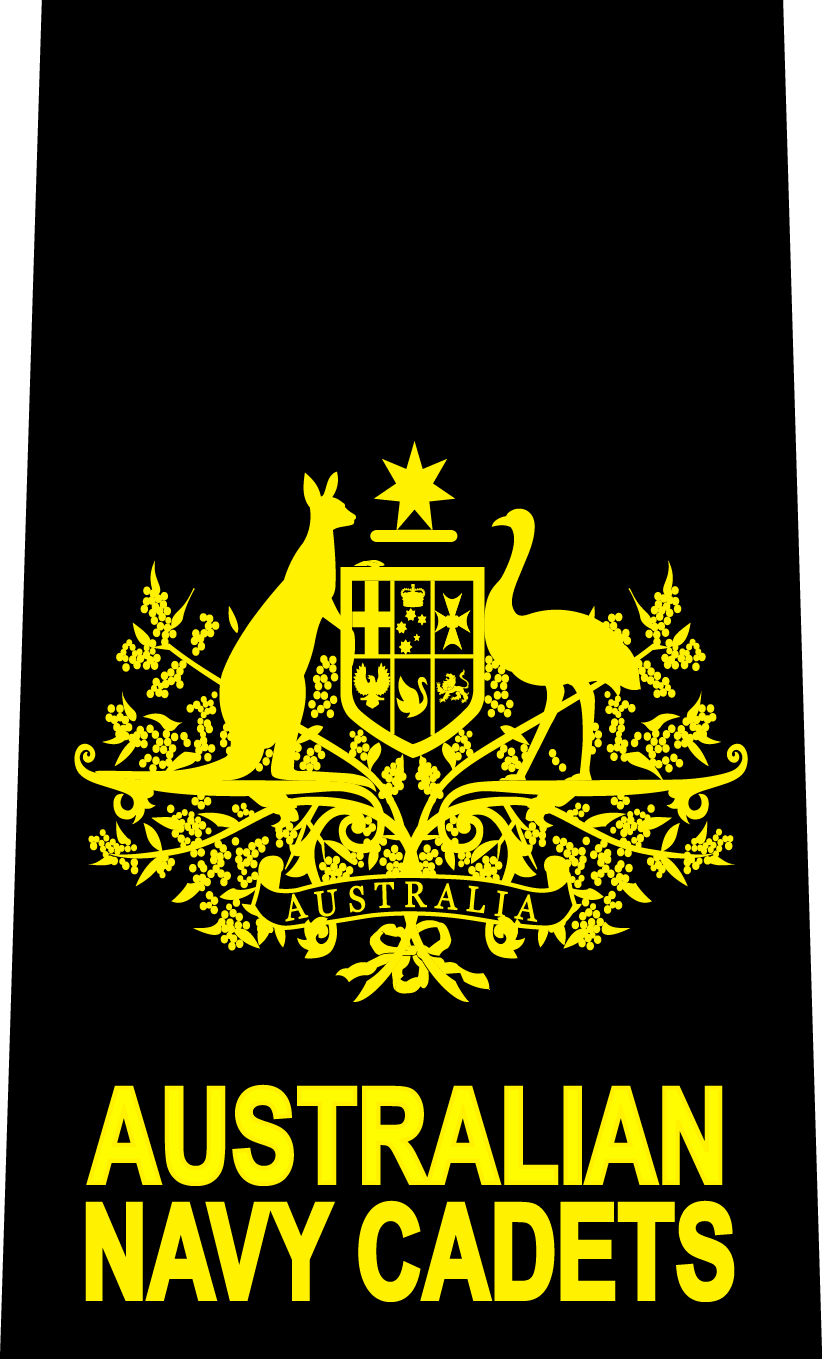
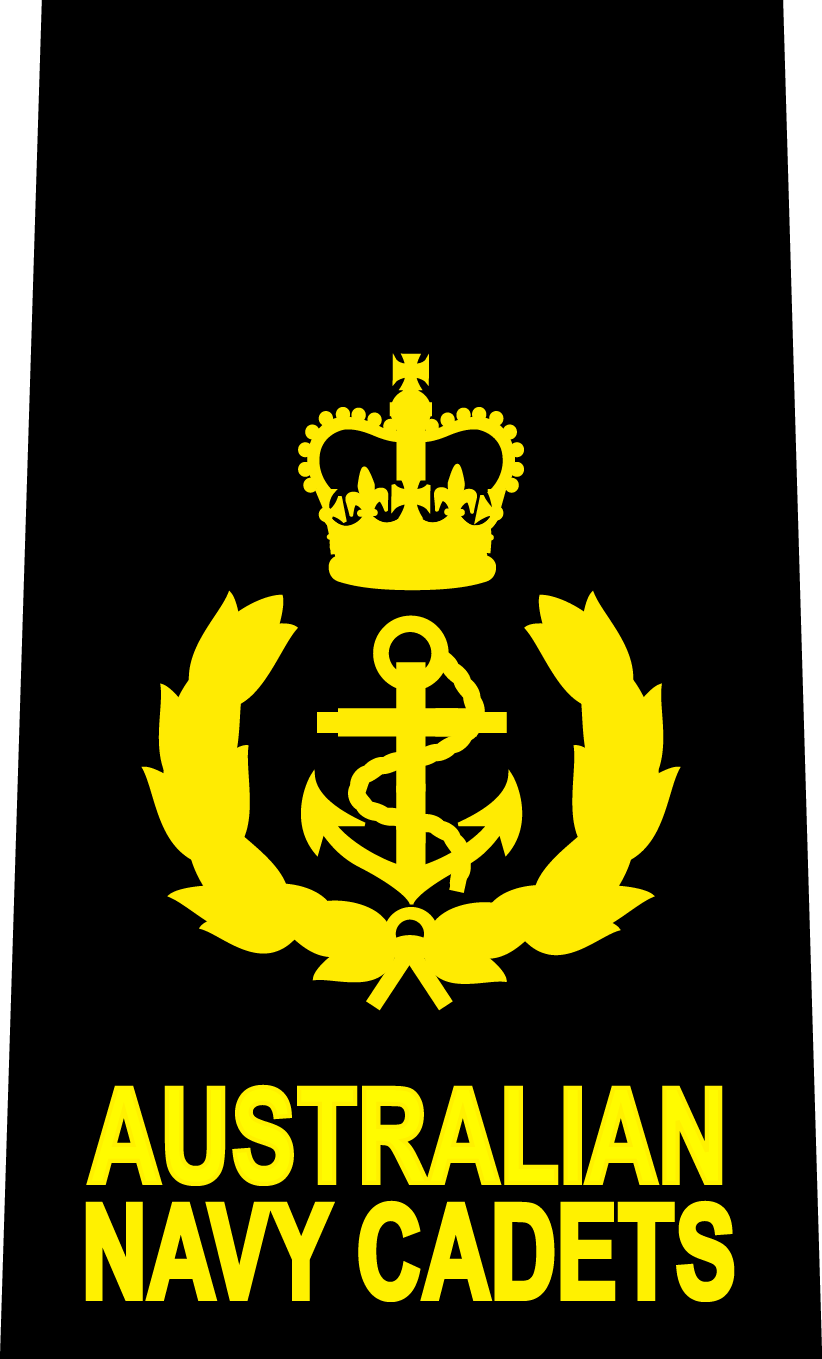
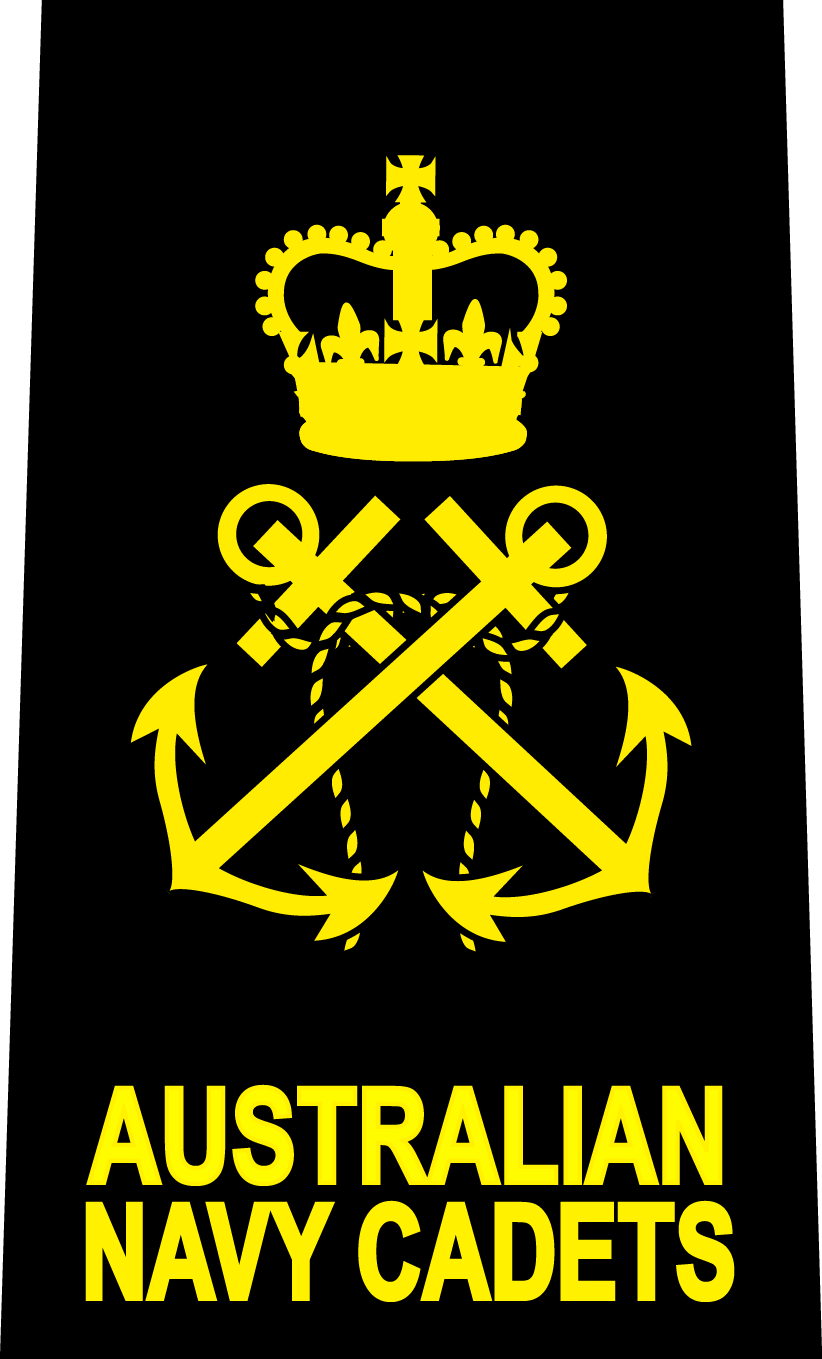
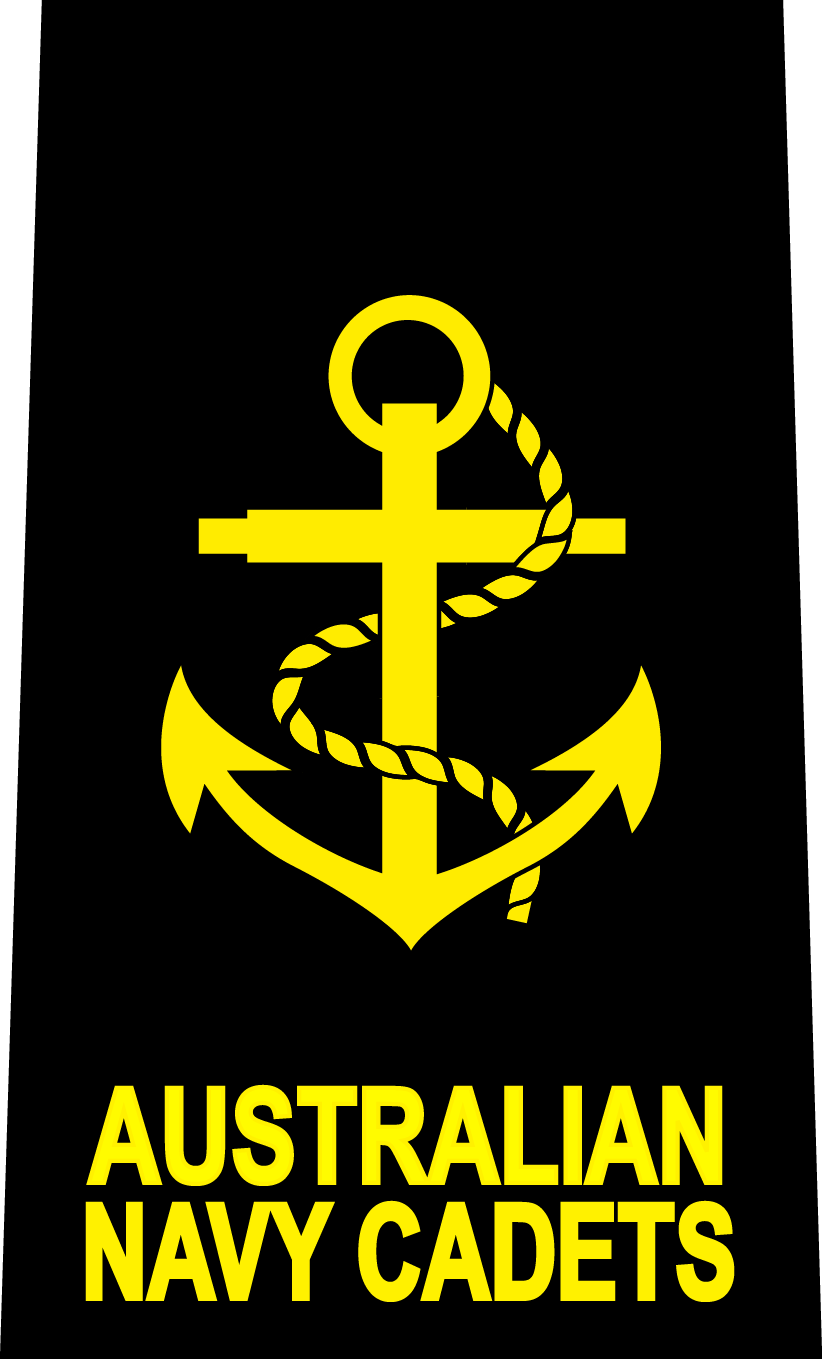
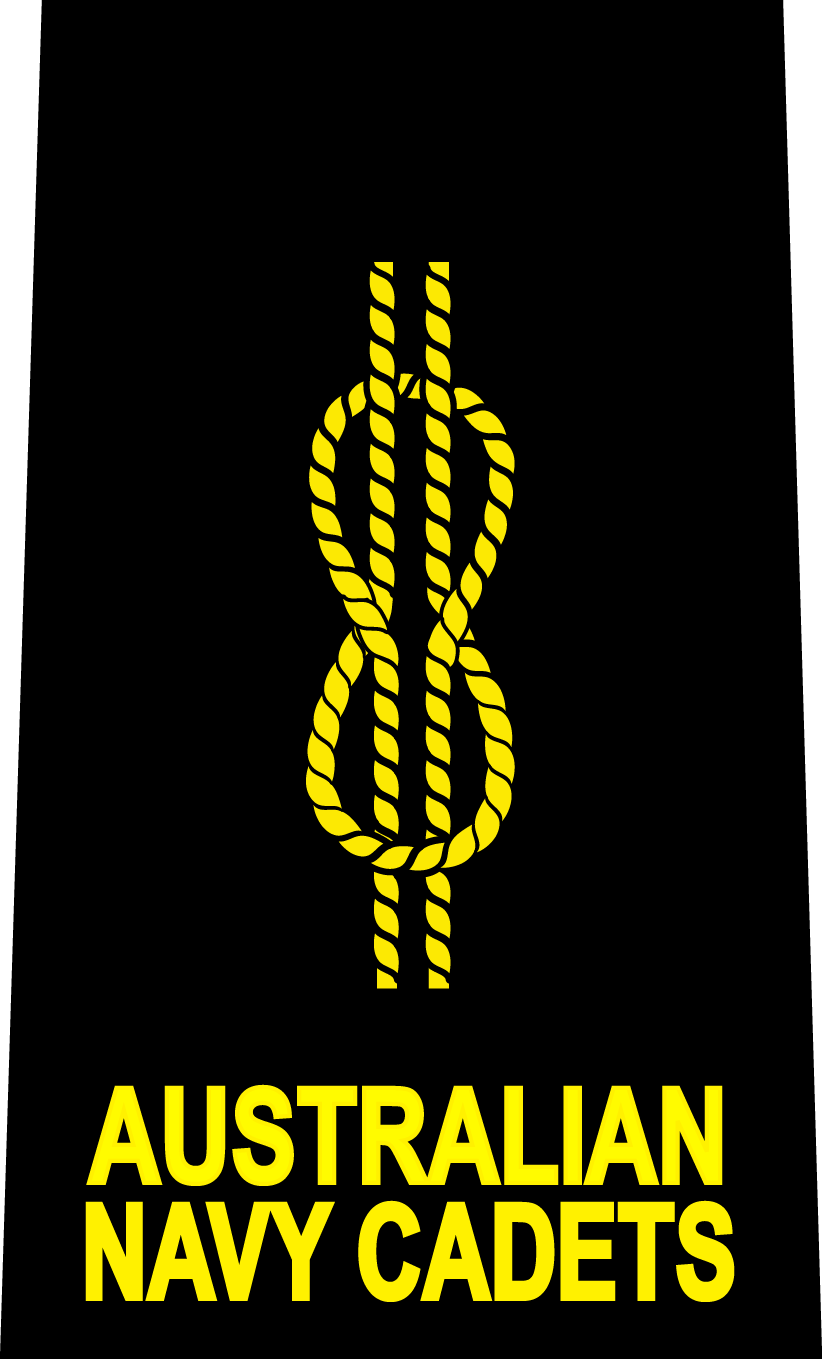
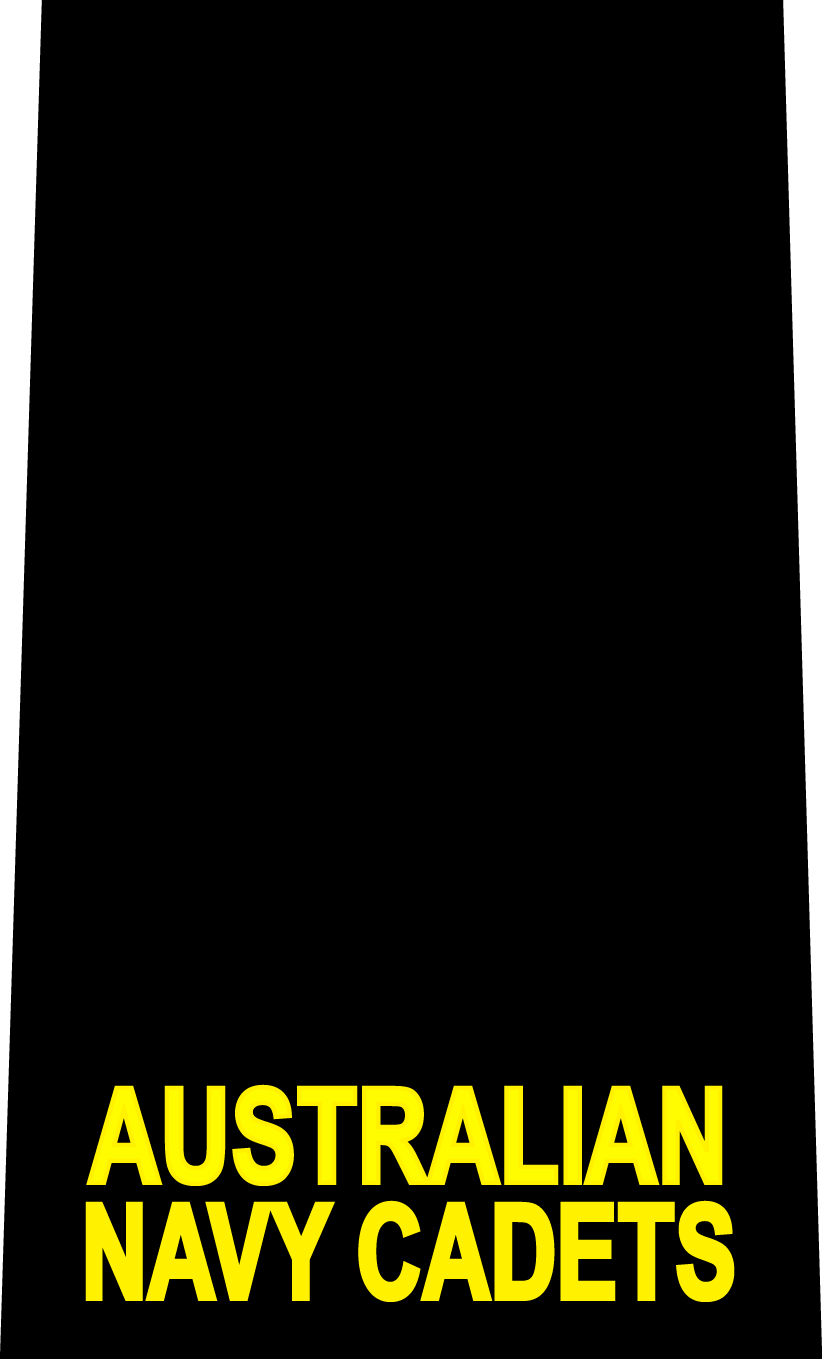
| ADFC Cadets | CDT 9 | CDT 8 | CDT 7 | CDT 6 | CDT 5 | CDT 4 | CDT 3 | CDT 2 | CDT 1 | CDT (R) |
|---|---|---|---|---|---|---|---|---|---|---|
| Australian Navy Cadet Insignia | | No equivalent | | | | | No equivalent | | | No insignia |
| Rank title: | Cadet Warrant Officer of the ANC | No equivalent | Cadet Warrant Officer | Cadet Chief Petty Officer | Cadet Petty Officer | Cadet Leading Seaman | No equivalent | Cadet Able Seaman | Cadet Seaman | Cadet Recruit |
| Abbreviation: | CWO-ANC | No equivalent | CDTWO | CDTCPO | CDTPO | CDTLS | No equivalent | CDTAB | CDTSMN | CDTRCT |
| Call: | Sir/Ma'am | | Sir/Ma'am | Chief | PO | Leader | | AB | N/A | N/A |

Example of use; CDTPO Robert Rooney

==== Volunteer helpers ====
A Defence Approved Helper (DAH) is a volunteer who isn't a part of the Australian Navy Cadets or the Australian Defence Force.

Example of use: Mr Robert Rooney, DAH

=== Speciality insignia ===
==== Category badges ====
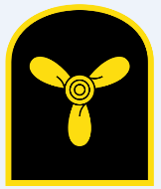
Maritime Engineering

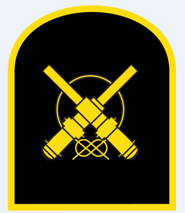
Maritime Operations

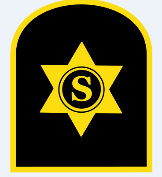
Maritime Support

==== Elective badges ====
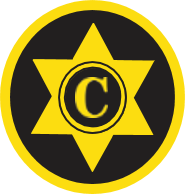
Cooking

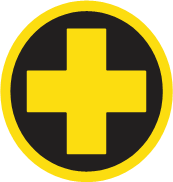
First Aid

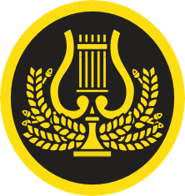
Musician

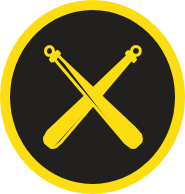
Physical Fitness and wellbeing

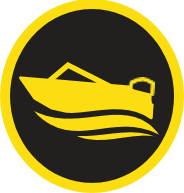
Powerboating

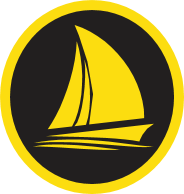
Sailing

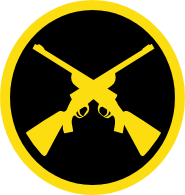
Skill at Arms

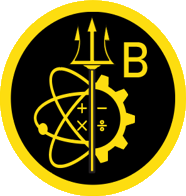
Bridge Operations

Drone Flying

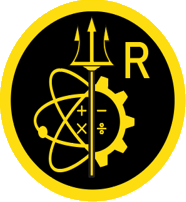
Robotics

=== Awards ===
| Award | Staff | Cadet | Years Service | Notes |
|---|---|---|---|---|
| Personal Efficiency Badge | All Ranks | All Ranks (except RCT) | Completion of set qualification criteria personal readiness with 12 month renewal | Staff (Silver Badges with Gold Wheel) Cadet (Silver Badge with Silver Wheel) |
| ACT Completion Certificate | N/A | All Ranks eligible | Completion of an ACT specialisation | Differs per flotilla |
| Long Service & Good Conduct Stripe | N/A | All Ranks (except WO & MIDN) | Staff (1 for every 4 years of Service) (1 for 4 years service as a cadet) (1 for every 4 years service in the RAN or RANR) (maximum of 3 stripes) Cadet (1 stripe for every year of service) (maximum of 3 stripes) |
| 5 Year Service Certificate | All Ranks | N/A | completion of 5 years service |
| 10 Year Service Certificate | All Ranks | N/A | completion of 10 years service |
| Australian Cadet Forces Service Medal | All Ranks | N/A | For 15 Years Long Service | A clasp is awarded for every five years thereafter. |
| National Commander ANC Commendation | All Ranks | N/A | for meritorious service | In Gold, Silver and Bronze. |
| Director General ANC Commendation | All Ranks | N/A | for extraordinary meritorious service | In Gold, Silver and Bronze. |
| Conspicuous Service Medal (CSM) | All Ranks | N/A | The medal recognises commendable achievement or commitment to duty in a non-combative context. It is awarded to members of the Australian Defence Force and certain other people for example, Defence Force chaplains. |
| Conspicuous Service Cross (CSC) | All Ranks | N/A | The cross recognises exceptional dedication to duty or outstanding achievement in skills or judgement in a non-combative context. It is awarded to members of the Australian Defence Force and certain other people such as members of philanthropic organisations. |

== See also ==
- Cadets (youth program)
- Australian Defence Force Cadets
- Australian Air Force Cadets
- Australian Army Cadets
- Other Sea cadet organisation
