= Henry Leonardus van den Houten =

Dutch-Australian painter, lithographer, and teacher

Henry Leonardus van den Houten (1801 – 17 February 1879) was a Dutch-Australian painter, lithographer and art teacher.

Van den Houten was born in The Hague, Netherlands, in 1801 and produced portraits in the Netherlands before emigrating in 1853, with his family, to Victoria, Australia. In Australia, he was employed as a drawing master and an art teacher, and his work was displayed at the Victorian Intercolonial Exhibition in 1875. He died in St Kilda, Victoria, and was buried at the St Kilda Cemetery.
