= Institution of Surveyors Victoria =

The Institution of Surveyors Victoria (ISV), is the peak body for the surveying profession in Victoria. ISV was originally known as the Victorian Institute of Surveyors (VIS), and was established in 1874. ISV is the oldest professional surveying body in both Victoria and Australia.

== Role ==
ISV promotes best practice, professional growth and continuing professional development (CPD) for land surveyors and especially for land (cadastral) surveyors. ISV also pursues strong connections with government, business, academe and the community. The key functions undertaken include:

- the conduct of congresses and seminars, which is especially important to enable Licensed Surveyors to fulfil mandatory CPD requirements, known as Further Professional Education or Training (FPET) under Section 7 of the Surveying Act 2004 for the Surveyors Registration Board of Victoria (SRBV)- SRBV does not provide FPET activities and is dependent on ISV and other bodies
- professional publishing including the institution's journal "Traverse"
- partnering with universities that teach surveying
- helping to formulate educational standards for cadastral surveyors
- conveying the opinions and expert advice of the surveying profession to government
- representation on SRBV
- engaging with other professional and industry bodies.

== Organization ==
ISV's board of directors is chaired by the elected president and its office is in Melbourne. From its first meeting on 7 April 1874, ISV members included surveyors from across all regions of the state. ISV now has four regional groups: the Gippsland Group, the Glenelg Grampians Group, the Murray Group and the North Central Victoria Group.

== History ==
Victoria was under the then colony of New South Wales until it became a separate colony in July 1851, and it gained self-governance from Britain in 1855. Upon the Federation of Australia, Victoria became an Australian state. Throughout, Victoria's surveyors have contributed to the state's development.

=== Establishment and incorporation ===
VIS which was established in 1874, was originally incorporated in 1895. In 1952, ISV merged with other Australian state surveying institutions to form the Institution of Surveyors Australia. However, it retained its separate incorporation, whilst becoming a state division of ISA. In 2007, ISV foresaw the closure of ISA and re-commenced as an institution in its own right. ISA closed as of 1 July 2009.

Robert Lewis John Ellery CMG FRS FRAS was the first serving President of VIS, serving for the period 1874–77. Ellery was elected Fellow of VIS in 1877, the first to be awarded the honour.

=== 1874: VIS inaugural meeting ===
VIS held its first "Ordinary Meeting" at Weber's Hotel (also known as Hockin's Hotel and Assembly Rooms), on the north west corner of Elizabeth and Lonsdale Streets, Melbourne on Saturday 9 May 1874 commencing at 12.30pm. The meeting was chaired by Stuart Murray MA CE, Secretary, and the minutes list the others present as Lt.Col.(then Major) Thomas Couchman CE, Vice-President; Thomas Bingham Muntz (Surveyor and Shire Engineer at Metcalf near Castlemaine); William Davidson ISO CE. (Government Surveyor); and Henry Archdall (Licensed Surveyor and Mining Surveyor).

The meeting noted a letter to the Surveyor-General Alexander John Skene MA JP dated 7 April 1874 informing him of his election to the office of President of the Institute. The meeting also noted a response letter from the Acting Secretary to A.J.Skene dated 28 April 1874 declining the office of President, as he was obliged by pressure of public business to vacate his position. As the inaugural meeting minutes make no mention of electing Major Robert Lewis John Ellery CMG RRAS FRAS to President, it is understood that only after the meeting was Ellery elected President and accepted the role.

The meeting addressed various correspondence, reviewed the members’ list, and admitted thirty-eight surveyors as Members of VIS. Of particular note, these included Skene (Surveyor-General) and Ellery (Government Astronomer) and future Surveyors-General Alexander Black, Michael Callanan, and Samuel Kingston Vickery. In addition to these thirty-eight admitted as members, Secretary Stuart Murray, in conjunction with the Vice President Thomas Couchman, Thomas Muntz and John Lardner (admitted member) were tasked with making enquiries as to the qualifications of nine other surveyors seeking membership.

Founding members listed: Robert Maxwell, Thomas H. Bell, Peter Simpson, (William) Sherwood Vernon, James (Rolland) Maxwell, Robert (Henry) Nankivell Jr, John (Grimes) Peers, Thomas E. McNulty, John McNulty, Edmond Colbert, Reginald (Augustus Frederick) Murray, Clarence Smith, Mark Amos, Henry Davidson, William (Lupton) Hargreave, Stuart Murray, Walter Cherry, Henry Archdall, Thomas (Bingham) Muntz, August J.M. Tuxen, Thomas Couchman, William Davidson, John Lardner, Samuel (Kingston) Vickery, William (Gregson) Couchman, Thomas Thomson, Joseph (Lowe) Shaw, Joseph Smith, Thomas H. Turner, Alexander (John) Skene, Robert (Lewis John) Ellery, Michael Callanan, William Thornhill, William (Knowles) Andrews, Alexander Black, Frederick (Joy) Pirani, William (Henry) Angove, John (Samuel) Langtree.

The Institute met at the Royal Society of Victoria, until March 1880, when rendezvous were changed to the Melbourne Exchange (erected behind the old Hall of Commerce, Collins Street West) which was considered a more central and convenient meeting place.

=== 1892: First Intercolonial Conference of Surveyors ===
On 31 October 1892, at Customs House in Melbourne, representatives of the respective Surveyors Examination Boards of the Australian Colonies and New Zealand convened the first Intercolonial Conference of Surveyors where it was proposed and agreed to introduce reciprocity for registration of surveyors. It was Robert Ellery, Chair of the Victorian Board of Examiners for Land Surveyors who introduced the proposal. Ellery was also elected President of the intercolonial Conference of Surveyors. At the time of this conference, Australia was entering a depression and the Surveyor-General position had remained unfilled since Surveyor-General Charles Whybrow Ligar had retired in May 1892. Ellery was also the Government Astronomer. He had worked under Surveyors-General Ligar, Alexander John Skene and Alexander Black. Reciprocity has largely continued since that agreement.

=== 1927: First Interstate Conference of the Australian Institutes of Surveyors ===
VIS convened the First Interstate Conference of the Australian Institutes of Surveyors in Melbourne, 2–4 November 1927. The conference was opened by the Minister for Lands and Water Supply, Henry Bailey, who was also the President of the Board of Land and Works. The Conference Welcome was delivered by the VIS President J.G. Gillespie who conveyed that cooperation of the respective State Institutes was paramount and unfortunately a proposed Conference in 1926 was unable to proceed, which led to Victoria taking on the task of convening. Gillespie spoke on the important lead role in the planning and development of Australian. Also of note, the Conference was informed of the judging of the competition of the plan for the Federal Capital design, led by surveyor Mr. J. Alexander Smith, appointed by the Federal Government after being nominated by the surveying profession.

=== 1952: The Institution of Surveyors Australia Established ===
In 1952, VIS merged with other Australian state surveying institutions to form the Institution of Surveyors Australia (ISA). At that point, it became known as the Melbourne Division of ISA.

=== 1956: Olympic Games Melbourne ===
The Melbourne Division of ISA provided technical advisory support to the 1956 Melbourne Olympic Games Organizing Committee. Although requested to take on a much bigger role, the Division agreed to provide expert advice on measuring three key events, viz. the Marathon run and also the 50 km and 20 km walks. The Olympic Organizing Committee adopted the Division's advice.

=== 1957-59: Key division decisions ===
It was reported that the two major decisions were made by the Divisional Committee during 1957. Firstly, that due to the growth of ISV, a full-time Manager Secretary, Mr. Neil Smith was appointed in May 1957. The second key decision was the Committee agreed to recommend that the new registered name of the organization would be the Institution of Surveyors Victoria, whilst also retaining the name the Institution of Surveyors Australia, Victorian Division. It seems the Committee and its Councillors to ISA were concerned about proposed changes to the ISA constitution and wanted to protect Victorian interests. It was not until the quarterly meeting of June 1959, that the new name, the Institution of Surveyors Victoria was officially registered. Further, ISV was also referred to as ISV acting for the Victorian Division of ISA.

=== 1974: ISV centenary ===
ISV celebrated its centenary at the 17th Australian Survey Congress in Melbourne, 23 February - 1 March 1974. The congress was held at Old Customs House, which now is the Immigration Museum, Melbourne. His Excellency, Major General Sir Rohan Delacombe KCMG KCVO KBE CB DSO, officially opened the congress on 25 February 1974. Of significance, the congress keynote address, “A Surveyor Looks at the Environment – the Next 100 Years”, was delivered by Professor Desmond O'Connor, the Foundation Professor of Environmental Studies at Murdoch University. Professor O'Connor was originally a surveyor.

=== 1994: FIG XX Congress ===
The International Federation of Surveyors (FIG) XX Congress, with the theme "Surveying global changes", was held in Melbourne, 5–12 March 1994.· The Congress, hosted by the former ISA, was largely under the organization of ISV and the Congress Director was Raymond Holmes. Holmes was an Honorary Fellow of ISV and also the twenty-second Surveyor-General of Victoria. ISV members undertook most of the key roles in conduct of the Congress to ensure its successful operation. The Congress was opened by the then Victorian Governor, His Excellency, Richard McGarvie AC QC. The Congress was recognized at that time as having the largest number of delegates, more than 1,000, and the first to achieve that number. Congress feedback overwhelming reported it as the best ever FIG Congress and the directorship of Holmes and the support of ISV has been acknowledged as critical to the success.

=== 1999: United Nations–FIG International Conference ===
The Victorian Division of ISA was a co-organizer of the joint United Nations–FIG International Conference on Land Tenure and Cadastral Infrastructures for Sustainable Development which was held in Melbourne on 24–27 October 1999. Around three hundred delegates, from some thirty countries, attended the Conference, with Peter Costigan, the Lord Mayor of Melbourne, welcoming delegates and the official opening by Ms. JoAnne DiSano, Director of the Sustainable Development Division of the United Nations Department of Economic and Social Affairs. The Conference embraced multiple themes including land, water, tenure reform, indigenous rights, women’s rights, the information revolution and government/institutional reform. The joint UN-FIG Bathurst Declaration on Land Administration for Sustainable Development was launched at the Conference. The Declaration was prepared the previous week at a workshop in Bathurst, New South Wales. The workshop involved forty representatives from around the world, including the World Bank, five United Nations agencies plus other delegates from civil society and academe.

=== 2001: Sesquicentenary of the Surveyor-General of Victoria 2001 ===
Another significant milestone for ISV was its support for the Sesquicentenary of the Surveyor-General of Victoria in 2001. Events were held throughout the year and the Victorian Division was part of the collaboration with the Office of the Surveyor-General of Victoria and the Association of Consulting Surveyors Victoria. The Victorian Division hosted the premier event for the Sesquicentenary, which was the Gala Dinner on 7 July 2001 with His Excellency Governor Landy being the guest of honour and keynote speaker. Governor Landy was accompanied by his wife Mrs. Lynne Landy. In addition, the Victorian Division coordinated a Commemorative two-page spread in the Herald Sun, published 7 July 2001, which included messages from the Governor and Surveyor-General.

=== 2002: Fiftieth Anniversary of ISA ===
On Saturday 25 May 2002, ISA celebrated its 50th Anniversary, Golden Jubilee, at Parliament House, Canberra, with a one-day conference followed by a gala formal dinner. ISA Victorian Division Councillor, Keith Bell, then Surveyor-General of Victoria, organised the Conference program, serving as Master of Ceremonies for the day and coordinated the gala dinner. He also prepared the Conference Report and organized for a fiftieth anniversary medal to be struck. Victorian Division members were amongst the conference’s speakers and panel discussion members, including Hon. Fellow, Professor Terry Roberts who delivered the keynote address. Private surveyor, Richard Simpson from Melbourne was the Master of Ceremonies for the gala dinner.

=== 2000-2009: The demise of ISA ===
The first decade of the new millennium was a difficult one for ISV. In 2000, under the leadership of Warwick Watkins, then Chair of the Australian New Zealand Land Information Council (ANZLIC), the National Spatial Action Agenda (NSAA) was conceived and promoted. In Victoria, the then Executive Director of Land Victoria, Elizabeth O'Keeffe, was a leading promoter of the NSAA. In September 2001, O’Keeffe signed a contract with the Australian Spatial Information Business Association (ASIBA), which later became known as the Spatial Information Business Association (SIBA), and in 2022 the Geospatial Council of Australia (GCA). The purpose of the contract was to lobby both the government and opposition in support of the NSAA. It was also later established the contract was to discredit ISV and the industry body, the Association of Consulting Surveyors Victoria (ACSV), which were working with Surveyor-General to support surveying reform. The contract was subsequently determined to be illegal and inappropriate and cancelled. However, ISV, ACSV and the Surveyor-General only became aware of the contract in February 2002.

A key ANZLIC driver for NSAA was for government to only talk to one professional body. ANZLIC funded a consultancy – Spatial Sciences Coalition – that was managed by a Victorian Division councillor. The process lacked transparency as that councillor, who was working in a private business capacity repeatedly declined to inform the ISA Council of who was driving the SSC. In fact, that councillor did not even mention the NSAA which remained unknown to ISA Council until 2002. The ISA Council was very divided over the SSC proposal, especially as the words “surveyor” and “surveying” were forbidden to be included in the term “Spatial Sciences Coalition”.

By 2003, the Spatial Sciences Institute had been established and the then President of ISA was also President of SSI. Victoria raised concerns of that being a conflict of interest. The “dual” president entered into a service agreement with the SSI, signed 6 May 2004, which actually commenced on 1 July 2003. Victorian Division concerns were ignored.

Victorian councillors and the Division committee endeavoured to keep ISV members informed of the concerns with SSI and the serious governance issues and lack of transparency. Further, the risks to ISA assets were identified as SSI would take control of all ISA assets. At least 139 Victorian members of ISA resigned during 2007. In 2007, ISV incorporated as a separate body. In 2009, ISA ceased to operate, and the new Surveying and Spatial Sciences Institute (SSSI) commenced.

With the merger of SSSI and SIBA to form GCA in 2022, it was claimed that GCA had become the paramount body for surveying in Australia. This is in spite of there being only 750 land surveying members of GCA. ISV has over 400 members and the Institution of Surveyors NSW (ISNSW) has around 1000 members. Further, the Western Australian Institution of Surveyors (WAIS) subsequently reformed and almost 300 members withdrew from SSSI to rejoin WAIS. At the time of NSAA’s push for SSC, ISA had around 3500 members.

Effective 21 August 2025, GCA officially entered liquidation, thus ceasing to be an organization. Liquidation followed entering voluntary administration—initiated in late May 2025 "amid cashflow stress, property settlement delays involving Surveyors House, and underwhelming event returns". It is also known that the former assets of ISA were squandered by GCA over the years where it failed to contain escalating costs. GCA's Chief Executive Officer was Tony Wheeler and it's board chair was Kate Lundy, a former Labor politician. Wheeler was a chair of one of GCA's predecessor organisations the Australian Spatial Information Business Association (ASIBA) later renamed, around 2001-2003 including the time when as Chair, then ASIBA signed an illegal contract with then Land Victoria (now Land Use Victoria) to lobby for the National Spatial Action Agenda and discredit the Surveyor-General of Victoria, ISV and the Association of Consulting Surveyors Victoria (ACSV).

=== 2016: ISV, ISNSW, WAIS and NZIS Meeting - Christchurch ===
During the FIG Working Week conference in Christchurch, 2–6 May 2016, representatives of ISV including then President, Doug Gow, Executive Officer, Gary White, and ISV Fellow, Keith Bell, met with delegations from ISNSW, WAIS and the New Zealand Institute of Surveyors (NZIS) to discuss the concerns regarding the closure of ISA and the loss of a national focus. The meeting was chaired by former ISA President and then ISNSW President Phil Hayward. Following on from the meeting, a Memorandum of Understanding (MOU) was prepared, under which ISV would take the lead role in bringing together the surveying-focused organizations from across Australia (Consulting Surveyors National, the Association of Consulting Surveyors NSW, ACSV, WAIS and the Queensland Surveying and Spatial Association) to establish a forum to open up communications and enable the exchange of information and collaboration on issues which impact on our Land Surveying members nationally. Unfortunately, it seems no further progress was made.

=== 2024: ISV Sesquicentenary ===
ISV celebrated its 150th anniversary, or Sesquicentenary, throughout 2024. Celebrations commenced with special reflections on Robert Ellery, the inaugural President, and events throughout the year covering elements of the history of surveying in Victoria and the roles played by ISV. Key events included the Regional ISV Conference which was held at Swan Hill, 26–28 April and the ISV Gala Dinner on 8 June.

== Institutional Name ==
VIS, which was established in 1874, was originally incorporated in 1895. With the formation of the Institution of Surveyors Australia (ISA) in 1952, VIS became known as the Melbourne Division of ISA. In 1957, arising from concerns about amendments to the ISA constitution, the Melbourne Division committee proposed that the Institution of Surveyors Victoria (ISV) would be known as the Victorian Division of ISA. However, it was only in 1959 that this name change proceeded to be registered. Around 2003, the Victorian Division committee became increasingly concerned with the proposed establishment of the Spatial Sciences Institute, which would replace ISA and the reputational risks to the surveying profession. These concerns increased and in 2007, ISV re-commenced as an incorporated institution in its own right. ISA closed as of 1 July 2009 and the Victorian Division of ISA as a name was dropped. ISV has also registered the name Surveyors Victoria in 2023.

== Membership ==
ISV members are primarily land surveyors, but other professional surveyors are also members including engineering, mining and geodetic surveyors and academics in the scientific fields associated with surveying. Many members are Licensed Surveyors, registered by SRBV to practice cadastral surveying in the state of Victoria. The Minister appoints two Licensed Surveyors to the SRBV who are nominated by the professional body representing the majority of Licensed Surveyors, as stipulated under section 47 of the Surveying Act 2004. ISV represents the significant majority of Licensed Surveyors in Victoria.

Originally, VIS membership only had a single category of membership, Ordinary Member. However, during the first decade of operation, VIS also created categories of Fellow and Honorary Member. Ellery was elected as the first Fellow of VIS in 1877. With the establishment of ISA in 1952, there were five categories of membership Honorary Fellow, Fellow, Member, Associate, and Student. However, ISV since incorporation in 2007 has six levels of membership: Honorary Fellow, Fellow, Member, Graduate, Associate, and Student. The highest levels of membership of ISV are Fellow and Honorary Fellow, which recognize eminent service to the surveying profession. Eminent Victorian surveyors from government, academe and the private sector have been elected to the grades of Fellow and Honorary Fellow.

Fellows are elected by the ISV Board of Directors from nominations received by no less than six Full Members who have rendered conspicuous service to the profession. The Constitution of the Institution of Surveyors Victoria (ISV) limits the number of Fellows at any given time to no more than ten percent (10%) of the total number of full members. The number of Honorary Fellows at any given time is also limited to a total of eight (8).

Over the years, ISV (VIS) has honoured several Surveyors-General of Victoria as Fellows or Honorary Fellows in recognition of their exceptional contributions to ISV (VIS) and outstanding service to the surveying profession. These include Alexander Black (Fellow VIS), Samuel Kingston Vickery (Fellow VIS), Joseph Martin Reed (Fellow VIS), Frank William Arter (Fellow VIS), Colin Edward Middleton (Fellow ISV), Raymond Eden Holmes (Honorary Fellow ISV) and Keith Clifford Bell (Fellow ISV).

Upon its establishment in 1874, VIS had 38 members. Prior to the First World War, it seems membership had grown to around 100 and by the start of the Second World War, there were 165 members, and by 1942, there were 179 members. Following the Second World War, with over two decades of massive post-war construction, especially housing expansion and infrastructure, membership had risen to 555 by 1968. Membership continued to grow until 1991, when it reached its peak of 672 members. However, the age profile has also increased and by 2003, the average member age was around 50. By 2010, the average age was late fifties. As surveyors retired, they also resigned ISV membership and by 2006 membership was at 432 and further decreased to 418 by 2015. By 2020, ISV membership had settled at around 400. Some of the ISV membership losses were due to the creation of SSSI, which attracted some of ISV's membership. However, it is also noted that Cadastral Surveying Commission membership numbers of SSSI have subsequently plummeted since it was established in 2009, both at the national and Victorian levels.

There is no doubt that the status of the Australia and Victorian economies has impacted the surveying profession. The early 1990s recession in Australia, often labelled as "the recession we had to have" by then Australian Federal Treasurer Paul Keating saw Australian housing and development suffer major falls. This also reduced demand for surveying services and impacted ISV membership. Previous major economic downturns have been the 1930s Great Depression in Australia that followed the collapse of Wall Street in 1929 and also the Australian banking crisis of 1893 causing a depression. Such economic downturns hit housing and development, causing surveyors to leave the profession. The 1890s depression had a major impact on settlement across Victoria. Conversely, the post Second World War construction boom increased demand for surveyors and ISV membership numbers grew significantly.

== Crest ==
The original crest of the Victorian Institute of Surveyors was created in 1874 and used on formal documents, such as membership certificates. The Latin motto was adapted from a section of Lucretius’ poem De Rerum Natura (in English: The Nature of Things) Volume IV, lines 514 to 516, and is generally understood as a warning that reasoning based on false senses is akin to a house made in a faulty fashion or built to false calculations.	Original crest of the Victorian Institute of Surveyors
Ink Stamp Masthead used by the Victorian Institute of Surveyors from 1878 to around the mid 1880s.	Ink Stamp of Victorian Institute of Surveyors (1878)
The current ISV crest was first registered by the Institution of Surveyors NSW Inc (ISNSW) in 1924, and was adopted by ISV in 1952. The crest was also adopted by the former ISA upon its inauguration in 1952. The crest is formed of a shield divided into four quadrants with a motto banner scroll beneath. The quadrants of the shied each symbolise an aspect of western surveying history and knowledge: Top left quadrant: Features the Crux Ansata, the ancient Egyptian symbol of immortality, along with the Phoenix—a classical emblem also used by Plato to represent immortality.; Top right quadrant: Displays the stars of the Southern Cross set upon the Cross of St. George, which served as England’s national ensign before the Union with Scotland. As registered, the proprietor undertook that the cross element of the design would not be printed in red.; Lower left quadrant: Depicts a map of the world or globe, with Australia shown prominently at its centre.; Lower right quadrant: Shows a pyramid encircled by a serpent. The pyramid references the surveying achievements of ancient Egypt in application of geometry. The serpent—sometimes interpreted as the Greek word for “key”—symbolises the key to geometry.; The motto written in Greek: “MHΔEIΣ AΓΕΩΜΕΤΡHTOΣ EIΣITΩ.” means in English: “Let no one without skill in measurement of the earth enter.” It is purported to come from the inscription over the portal of Plato's Academy. The motto translation in English was originally reported by ISNSW to mean "Let no one without skill in geometria enter". However, “geometria” is not an English word. Rather, it is Greek and means "measurement of the earth". Research into the history of ISA resulted in a report published by ISNSW Fellow, Keith Cadogan, which includes an annex on the Crest. This report includes advice provided in 1973 from the then University of Sydney’s Professor in Greek, Professor William Ritchie, that the correct translation is: “Let no one without skill in the measurement of the Earth enter.” In effect, "measurement of the Earth", or "measurement of land" as some may infer, is core to what surveyors do.	Institution of Surveyors Crest 1891 - Colour

== Traverse ==
Traverse is the magazine of ISV which is published nominally on a quarterly basis and is intended to provide members with technical and educational articles, letters from members regarding matters of interest, reports from office bearers and information on events and other activities. In late 1963, two eminent members of the Division, Alan Brown and Frank Noonan, put a proposal to the Divisional Committee that Traverse be established as the Division's magazine. The Committee then agreed “to proceed with Traverse in a fresh, easily read, modern format”. The first issue was published March 1964 and replaced the Division’s “News Bulletin” which had been published for the previous decade.

Since April 2013, Issue 288, Traverse has been published both in hardcopy and digital formats.

During the covid pandemic period, there was a pause in publishing Traverse, from Issue 329 of December 2020 until it resumed with Issue 330 in June 2023.

== Awards & Prizes ==
Current awards and prizes include:

=== JG Gillespie Gold Medal Prize ===
Established by LTCOL James G Gillespie, MBE, LS, Hon FISAust, FRICS, the prize is designed to support emerging surveyors as they develop their careers. In addition to academic merit, this award recognises the technical ability, professional achievement and community spirit of each applicant. Applicants must have:

- no more than 10 years professional experience since completing undergraduate studies in surveying or related discipline at the Royal Melbourne Institute of Technology (RMIT University).
- completed significant additional education or training (e.g. registered as a Licensed Surveyor, obtained relevant post-graduate qualifications).
- demonstrated qualities that show the surveying profession and themselves in a positive light.

=== Robert Hoddle Prize in Surveying ===
The prize is for a paper or project that demonstrates technical excellence, imagination, sensitivity to the environment, presentation and communication quality. The prize is to be awarded annually on the basis of one or more of the following:

- A paper or papers submitted for publication in a scientific journal or an international conference.
- A surveying project or a project including a significant surveying component.
- Achievements in Post-Graduate Survey Study.
- A notable achievement in Surveying.

For the purposes of awards surveying refers to the work carried out by a surveyor under the FIG ‘Definition of a Surveyor’.

Summarised as a "professional person with the academic qualifications and technical expertise to practice the science of measurement; to assemble and assess land and geographic information for the purpose of planning and implementing the efficient administration of the land, the sea and structures thereon; and to instigate the advancement and development of such practices."
