= Surveyor-general of Victoria =

Person nominally responsible for government surveying in Victoria, Australia

The Surveyor-General of Victoria is the public service officer nominally responsible for government surveying in Victoria, Australia. The original duties for the Surveyor-General were to measure and determine land grants for settlers in Victoria. (see History of Victoria). The Surveyor-General continues to be the primary government authority on surveying and the cadastre (land property boundaries and tenure).

The Surveyor-General is also the chair of the Surveyors Registration Board of Victoria (formerly the Surveyors Board of Victoria) and also holds the appointment of the registrar of geographic names. In addition, the Surveyor-General is a member of the Electoral Boundaries Commission of Victoria and a member of the Federal Electoral Redistribution Committee for Victoria. The Surveyor-General is a State Verifying Authority for the measurement of length.

The Surveying Act 2004, Act 47/2004, Part 6, specifies the appointment, suspension and functions of the Surveyor-General. Note that the act spells "Surveyor-General" with a hyphen, which is the conventional spelling. The Surveyor-General is required to be a Licensed Surveyor.

The Surveyor-General was originally created as a department following the separation in July 1851 of the Port Phillip District from the Colony of New South Wales to establish the Colony of Victoria. Prior to that, Port Phillip was a district branch of the NSW Surveyor-General’s Department. The Surveyor-General initially also held political office, being a member of the Victorian Legislative Council 1851-1855 and then as a Minister 1855-57. Thereafter, it changed from being that of a Ministry to a public service role as commissioner of Crown Lands and Survey and also the Surveyor-General. During its history, the office of Surveyor-General has come under a range of different departments and divisions, with different reporting arrangements. It has also downsized, and responsibilities changed.

Previous responsibilities of the Surveyor-General have included being the guardian of Aborigines, which was transferred from the chief secretary to the Surveyor-General in 1856. Subsequently, it was assumed by the Board of Land and Works, under the Department of Crown Lands and Survey in 1857. The planning for and surveying of proposed railway lines in Victoria also became an important role. In May 1856, a sub-department of railways within the Surveyor-General's Department. It was established within this department because the prime function of 'Victorian Railways' was, at that time, the survey of proposed lines of railway. In the post Second World War period, the Surveyor-General was also director of mapping, but in 1995 lost this position to the Office of Geographic Data Coordination (OGDC), which became the Land Information Group (LIG) under Land Victoria. The responsibilities have continued with another business unit under what is now Land Use Victoria.

== Sesquicentenary of the Surveyor-General of Victoria 2001 ==
Victorian governor John Landy with the then surveyor-general and previous appointees at the Institution of Surveyors Victoria Gala Dinner 2001	Pictured (L-R): Barrie Bremner (acting 1998), Alan Fennell (acting 1998–1999), Robert Eddington (acting 1988), Surveyor-General (at 2001) Keith Bell AM RFD (1999–2003), Governor of Victoria John Landy AC CVO MBE FTSE (2001–2006), Colin Middleton ISO (1967–1972), Raymond Holmes AM (1979–1988), and John Parker (1989–1998) The sesquicentenary of the Surveyor-General of Victoria in 2001 was a collaboration between the office of the Surveyor-General of Victoria and the surveying profession to celebrate the 150 years of the office since the appointment of the first Surveyor-General Robert Hoddle on 15 July 1851. Hoddle was appointed just two weeks after the Colony of Victoria, was founded with its separation from New South Wales, under the enabling legislation passed by the New South Wales Legislative Council which took effect 1 July 1851. The Sesquicentenary celebrations included events undertaken throughout Victoria including: 1 May 2001 - ceremony on the Jeparit-Rainbow Road at the 36th Parallel of Latitude South, at Geppert's Gate, where the Iron Survey Post monument was unveiled by the Hindmarsh Shire President, John Kemfert and the Victorian Surveyor-General, Keith Bell. The monument is a replica of the survey monument posts that Surveyor Tom Turner laid along the longitude meridians of 36th Parallel of latitude during his historic 1884 survey.; 7 July 2001 - The Institution of Surveyors Victoria (ISV) organized the Gala Dinner celebration and His Excellency Governor John Landy was the guest of honour and keynote speaker. Governor Landy was accompanied by his wife Mrs. Lynne Landy.; 16 July 2001 - Victorian Governor John Landy unveiled a plaque outside of Melbourne's Docklands Stadium to honour Hoddle and commemorate the point of origin for the Survey of Melbourne, Batman's Hill Datum, which commenced in 1837. The plaque was commissioned by the Surveyors Board of Victoria, through the then Surveyor-General, Keith Bell, and in conjunction with the Docklands Authority, and the surveying profession of Victoria (i.e. ISV); 7 July 2001 - Commemorative two-page spread in the Herald Sun with messages from the governor and Surveyor-General, organised by ISV.; September 2001 – A storyboard commemorating the survey of Yea by Thomas Wilkinson Pinniger was unveiled by the Surveyor-General with members of the Yea and District Historical Society and Local government officials. Pinniger was the father of George William Pinniger, Surveyor-General 1925-26.; October 2001 - Surveyor White’s Cairn located on the border of Victoria and South Australia, and roughly 2 hours west of Mildura was rebuilt by local surveyors from Mildura and Renmark and commemorated in a joint ceremony with the Surveyor-General. White’s Cairn is one of the most accessible survey marks along the state border.; November 2001 – Commemorative plaque and theodolite sculpture monument dedicated to the surveying of the Victorian South Australia Border undertaken by Surveyors Henry Wade and William White unveiled by Surveyors-General Keith Bell (Victoria) and Peter Kentish (South Australia), approximately four kilometers west from Nelson, Victoria.; 2001 was also the Australian Centenarian of Federation, and the Sesquicentenary celebrations were acknowledged by then Australian Prime Minister John Howard as making a very significant contribution.

== List of Surveyors-General of Victoria ==
Ordinal	Officeholders	Period in office	Achievements	Notes
1	Robert Hoddle	1851–1853	Hoddle was appointed as the first Surveyor-General of Victoria on 15 July 1851. He became the Surveyor-General upon the proclamation of the Port Phillip District as the new Colony of Victoria within the British Empire on 1 July 1851. He was previously the Surveyor-in-Charge of the Port Phillip District from 1837 to 1851. He is especially recognized for the design and layout of the Hoddle Grid in 1837, the area which forms the Melbourne central business district (CBD). Hoddle commenced his surveying career as cadet surveyor in the British army in 1812. Subsequently he worked for Ordnance Survey in Great Britain which included the country’s trigonometrical survey. Ordnance Survey was a military organization. In 1822, he was assigned to South Africa where he undertook military surveying for a short period, before he resigned and emigrated to the British colony of New South Wales in Australia in April 1823. Soon after arriving in the colony, he was appointed as an assistant surveyor under the Surveyor-General, John Oxley. His early work included surveying the road over the Blue Mountains. In 1824, he assisted Oxley with the initial survey and the establishment of the site of Brisbane as part of an expedition to Moreton Bay. Upon returning south, over he next twelve years, he worked on surveys of the districts in the Southern Highlands including Berrima and Goulburn. It is also notable that between 1830 and 1836, Hoddle undertook surveys of the rural district now occupied by the Australian Capital Territory (ACT). Hoddle was by any measure a consummate professional in matters of planning and development. As such, it is well reported that his outspoken criticism of the manner in which streets and highways had been allowed to develop, amongst other issues, was not well received by the colonial administration and by 1853, then Governor Charles La Trobe is reported to have eased him out to enable a much younger replacement, viz. Andrew Clarke. In effect, it would seem that La Trobe wanted a more compliant Surveyor-General who would follow his directions rather than question and speak out about what was wrong. Hoddle "retired" after less than two years as Surveyor-General, enabling his successor Clarke to commence in March 1853. Hoddle remained in Melbourne for the remainder of his life, dying in October 1881 at 87 years of age.	
2	Sir Andrew Clarke; GCMG CB CIE	1853 – 1857	Clarke was the youngest appointee to hold the office of the Surveyor-General of Victoria at 28 years of age in March 1853. At the time of being appointed Surveyor-General, Clarke held the rank of Captain in the British Army's Royal Engineers. Just 5 months later he was elected to Victoria's Legislative Council retaining the role of Surveyor-General and commencing a period where the office was held to be held by an elected politician rather than a public servant. A major focus of Clarke's term as Surveyor-General was that he was responsible for much of the planning of Victoria's first railways. In March 1857, and upon stepping down as Surveyor-General, Clarke returned to England and sought other colonial posts. Clarke was later to be promoted to Lieutenant General during his distinguished career. Clarke served as the second Governor of Singapore and the Governor of the Straits Settlements from 4 November 1873 until 7 May 1875. Clarke played a key role in positioning Singapore as the main port for the Malay states of Perak, Selangor and Sungei Ujong.	
3	George Samuel Wegg Horne	March – April 1857	Horne was a lawyer and politician rather than a surveyor. He was elected to the Victorian Legislative Council for Belfast and Warrnambool in September 1854, a position he held until March 1856. In November 1856 Horne was elected to the Victorian Legislative Assembly for the Electoral district of Warrnambool and he resigned in February 1861. Horne also contested the seats of Kilmore in 1853 and Rodney in 1856. From 11 March 1857 to 29 April 1857 Horne was Commissioner Crown Lands and Survey and also the Surveyor-General of Victoria. In addition to having the shortest tenure as Surveyor -General of just seven weeks, he was the last Surveyor-General of Victoria to be a politician rather than a public servant. Horne was also commissioner of Public Works from 21 December 1858 to 27 October 1859. After politics, Horne resumed work as an attorney and practised in Melbourne before moving to New Zealand in 1867.	
−	George Christian Darbyshire (Acting)	1857	Darbyshire was a civil engineer and migrated to Australia, arriving in Melbourne in July 1853 where he was appointed as Engineer of Construction and District Surveyor under the Victorian Government at Williamstown. He was then appointed Engineer-in-Chief of the Victorian Railways, from April 1856 to May 1860, but did so on the condition that he retained his substantive appointment as District Surveyor Williamstown and could return to that at any time. His term at Victorian Railways was interrupted when he was recruited by Surveyor-General Clarke to the Survey Department to lead railway engineering surveys in early 1857. Clarke departed in March 1857. However, the position of Surveyor-General may have remained vacant until July 1857. Darbyshire acted as Deputy Surveyor-General from May to July 1857 and then acted as the Surveyor-General until October 1857. Thereafter he returned to his substantive position as District Surveyor Williamstown. In the 1860s and 1870s, Darbyshire was a licensed surveyor undertaking township and rural surveys for Government and private practice. He was responsible for the Town Plan of Lorne in 1871. Darbyshire was a Member of the Victorian Institute of Surveyors (VIS). In 1881, Darbyshire returned to Victorian Railways as Engineer for Construction and Surveys, laying out many new lines. In 1891, he again became Chief Engineer of Victorian Railways, after the incumbent died. Darbyshire remained Chief Engineer until his own death in 1898, aged seventy-seven.	
−	Clement Hodgkinson (Acting)	1857–1858	Hodgkinson was born in England in 1818. He qualified as a civil engineer and at the age of 21, decided to migrate to Australia to become a pastoralist and he settled into a cattle property near Kempsey New South Wales. Within about one year, he was engaged by the NSW government to survey and explore areas in the northeast of the colony to as far north as Moreton Bay. Hodgkinson was especially interested in making contact with Aboriginal peoples and especially recorded his observations on indigenous tribes and natural history including rainforests in the areas he explored. He wrote the book "Australia, From Port Macquarie to Moreton Bay; With Descriptions of the Natives, Their Manner and Customs; The Geology, Natural Productions, Fertility, and Resources of that Region; First Explored and Surveyed" which was published in 1845 after he had returned to England. The book provides his detailed descriptions of the Aboriginal peoples including the manners and customs he observed. He also reported on soils, geology, vegetation and forests and other resources identified in the areas he first explored and surveyed. Hodgkinson returned to Australia, arriving in Melbourne in 1852 and joined the Survey Department as a draftsman and in 1855 was appointed as a District Surveyor by Surveyor-General Clarke. He is known for surveying the township of Warrandyte in 1856. Hodgkinson was appointed acting Surveyor-General in October 1857 and held the position until March 1858 when Charles Ligar was appointed. Hodgkinson was then appointed as deputy Surveyor-General. After reorganization in 1860, he became Assistant Commissioner and Secretary of the new Board of Crown Lands and Survey. In 1860, Hodgkinson was a member of the Royal Society's Exploration Committee which organised the Burke and Wills expedition. He retired from the Victorian Public Service on 11 March 1874. Hodgkinson was also appointed to other roles immediately, and just after his retirement: Inspector General of Metropolitan Parks and Reserves in 1873-74.; As Victorian Assistant-Commissioner of Crown Lands and Survey, establishing a programme of reservation, regulation, administration and education to control the use of Victoria's forests. This led to the establishment of the Central Forest Board in 1874 on which Hodgkinson was a member.; Member of the then newly established Committee of Management to inspect the City Gardens in 1883. Hodgkinson is especially noted for designing and development of significant Melbourne parks and gardens including: Flagstaff Gardens in 1862; Fitzroy Gardens in 1860; and Treasury Gardens in 1867.	
4	Charles Whybrow Ligar	1858–1869	Ligar was born in Ceylon, where his father was stationed with the British army. He was educated at the Royal Military College (1825–1828) commencing at the age of 13. Shortly after graduation as a commissioned officer with the rank of Second Lieutenant in the Royal Engineers, he resigned his commission and joined Ordnance Survey as a civilian assistant on the Ordnance Survey of Ireland until 1840. On 16 February 1841, Ligar was announced to be the next Surveyor-General of New Zealand, under proclamation issued by Queen Victoria and he took up the position in January 1842. Ligar held the position until February 1856. However, his final four years would seem to be without authority or role. It is reported that during the period 1852 to 1876 the office of Surveyor-General lapsed, and responsibility was placed with the New Zealand Provincial Surveyors. Ligar was appointed Surveyor-General of Victoria in 1858. It is reported that with his appointment he promised to reduce survey costs and open the land for settlers. Soon after taking up office, as part of his approach to cost reduction, Ligar initially proposed to replace all government surveyors with contractors. This move proved to be politically unpopular and was the start of his falling out with politicians. However, to his credit, one of his significant successes in cost savings was through the development and implementation of photolithographic duplication of survey plans and maps, a process developed "in-house" by John Walter Osborne. By 1869, Ligar’s political unpopularity was such that his position become untenable and leading politicians demanded his removal from office. In September 1869, Ligar resigned and left Melbourne to retire overseas, living at various times in Germany, Morocco, Algeria and Spain, before finally settling in Texas, USA, where he had a cattle ranch until his death in February 1881.	
5	Alexander John Skene	1869–1886	Skene, from Scotland, arrived in Melbourne in 1839, and held a number of government surveyor roles including that of being in charge of the District Survey Office at Geelong until he was transferred to the Melbourne district office in 1862. In June 1863, he was appointed District Surveyor for the newly united Melbourne and Geelong districts. In September 1868, he was appointed as acting Surveyor-General during the incumbent Ligar’s leave of absence. One year later, September 1869, Skene was appointed as the Surveyor-General. To date, Skene has been the longest-serving Surveyor-General of Victoria, with almost seventeen years in office. In the broader cartographic field, he was a prime mover in the compilation of the first comprehensive and reliable map of Victoria, produced in 1876 on a scale of eight miles to the inch, and also one of the most accurate of the early maps of Australia, first published in 1880. Skene gave evidence in June 1879 before the 1878-79 Royal Commission on crown lands, and under his guidance impressive county maps of Victoria were prepared for the detailed operation of the revised Land Regulations of the 1880s. Skene was also a commissioner of land tax, appointed in 1878, while Surveyor-General and after retiring as Surveyor-General and reappointed as a commissioner of land tax in 1887, continuing in that role until his death in 1894. In 1887 he was a member of the royal commission on the extension of Melbourne westward. Skene was one of the thirty-eight inaugural (founding) members of the Victorian Institute of Surveyors (VIS), now known as ISV in 1874. He was invited to be the inaugural President. However, due to the pressing demands of being Surveyor-General, he had to decline. This resulted in Robert L. J. Ellery being appointed VIS President for the period 1874-77. Skene was a Member of VIS and did go on to serve as VIS President at a later time as reported by the Institute. ISV and Consulting Surveyors Victoria instituted the Alexander Skene Award in 2025. This award is given to the most outstanding overall project judged from the “Industry Awards” categories. As the longest serving Surveyor-General of Victoria, Skene and was determined by ISV and CSV as the exemplar of excellence in surveying within the State of Victoria.	
6	Alexander Black	1886–1892	Black was born in Scotland and after training as a surveyor, migrated to the colony of Victoria in 1852 to work on the goldfields around Castlemaine. Subsequently he moved to Melbourne and joined the Victorian Government Office of Crown Lands and Survey. Black is especially noted for his survey of the Black-Allan Line, a portion of the border of Victoria and New South Wales. Black was appointed Surveyor-General of Victoria on 1 July 1886 and held the position until his retirement in May 1892, at the mandatory age of 65. The position remained unfilled until 1894. His retirement is noted in the gazettal of his successor Callanan, 6 April 1894, "vice Alexander Black retired". Black was one of the founding members of VIS in 1874 and was the second President (following Ellery) serving for the period 1878 to 1880. Black was elected Fellow of VIS in 1880.	
−	position vacant	1892–1894	The position had been unfilled since May 1892, possibly due to Victorian government austerity measures arising from the onset of the world financial crisis which hit Australia in 1892-93 and was declared a Depression in 1893. On 31 October 1892, at Customs House in Melbourne, representatives of the respective Surveyors Examination Boards of the Australian Colonies and New Zealand convened the first Intercolonial Conference of Surveyors where it was proposed and agreed to introduce reciprocity for registration of surveyors. It was Robert Ellery, Chair of the Victorian Board of Examiners for Land Surveyors who introduced the proposal. Ellery was also the Government Astronomer. He had worked under Surveyors-General Ligar, Skene and Black. Reciprocity has continued since that agreement.	
7	Michael Callanan	1894–1895	Callanan was born in Ireland and after qualifying as a surveyor migrated to Victoria in June 1854. Thereafter, he was employed by Surveyor-General Clarke as a surveyor. Much of his surveying work concerned mapping of Victorian lands to help manage and control land settlement. The Nicholson Land Act (1860) opened up more than 400,000 acres for settlement. The following Land Act (1862) opened up a further 1.98 million acres and thereafter the Land Act (1865) opened up more than 2.28 million acres. Further Land Acts followed. Much of it was to enable land access for agricultural and to control squatting where large tracts of land had been grabbed. Callanan was reported to be a scrupulous government land official determined to enable the fair treatment and consideration of all applicants for land, despite the challenges and dangers of dealing with squatters. By 1875, he was a District Surveyor for Melbourne. He was appointed Surveyor-General in 1894 and remained in the position until 1895, when he reached mandatory retirement age of 65. It is possible that Callanan was the oldest to be appointed to Surveyor-General. Callanan was also appointed as a Member of the Board of Land and Works in 1894. Callanan died in 1899 whilst holding the office of Surveyor-General. Callanan was one of the founding members of VIS in 1874.	
8	Samuel Kingston Vickery	1895–1899	Vickery was born in Cork Ireland in 1840 and was educated at Queens University as a civil engineer. In 1861, he migrated to Victoria and was employed as a field assistant with the Railway Department. He was engaged on surveying work and was worked on the survey of the Ballarat to Stawell. In January 1864, he was gazette as the Mining Surveyor and Registrar for the Beechworth mining districts responsible for the divisions of Jamieson and Alexandra. In1869, he became responsible for the Stawell Mining District. In 1870, he transferred to the Crown Lands and Survey Department, initially as assistant surveyor and by 1878 he was appointed as the District Surveyor for the Western and Wimmera districts. In July 1895, he was appointed Surveyor-General. Vickery died in 1899 whilst holding the office of Surveyor-General. Vickery’s other significant contributions to Victoria including assisting in the preparation of the geological sketch map of the colony for the Mines Department and also supporting the delimitation of the colony’s forest for the Conservator of Forests and the Chief Inspector of Forests. Vickery was one the founding members of VIS in 1874. He was appointed a Fellow of VIS in 1887 and served as the Vice-President in 1893 and the President in 1894. Vickery was also a Fellow of both the Royal Geographical Society of Australia and the Royal Geographical Society of England. He was also an Associate member of the London Institute of Civil Engineers.	
9	Joseph Martin Reed ISO	1899–1914	Reed was probably the first Australian-born and indeed Victorian-born Surveyor-General of Victoria, born in Creswick, Victoria in 1857. After finishing high school he became a student teacher before starting at the Lands Department as a trainee draughtsman and then moving into surveying. Reed passed the Land Surveyors Examination in 1879 with credit. He then worked for 2 years as a draughtsman before being appointed to the Melbourne District Survey Office staff. He was appointed Surveyor-General in August 1899 and was appointed as the Secretary for the Lands in 1914. In 1912, Reed chaired the Australian Conference of Surveyors-General held in Melbourne. In July 1918, he retired from that position, having been a Victorian public servant for 43 years. Reed was also the first Surveyor-General to be promoted to Secretary of Lands. Other roles undertaken by Reed included being a member of the Lands Purchase and Management Board in 1906. He was also chairman of the Tourist Resorts Committee from 1911 to 1931. He died in June 1932. Reed was a Fellow of VIS.	
10	Alexander Bruce Lang	1914–1925		
11	George Stewart Pinniger	1925–1926		
12	Fenelon De la Motte Mott	1926–1928	Mott served previously as District Surveyor, Bairnsdale, Victoria, 1913–26. He surveyed a large part of the backcountry of East Gippsland and also presented valuable reports in regard to suitable harbours along its coasts. Mott Street, HOLDER, ACT, which was gazetted on 21 Oct 1971, is named in his honour.	
13	Albert Edward W. Tobin	1928–1932	Tobin was a Member of VIS.	
14	Peter Campbell	1932–1935		
15	Henry William Moore	1935–1938		
16	Oscar George Pearson	1938–1952	Pearson, as Chairman of the Surveyors Board of Victoria, presented its first ever annual report to the Minister of Lands, Mr. G.J. Tuckett MLC, for the year ended 30 June 1943. Pearson served in the First Australian Imperial Force (AIF) during the First World War from June 1916 and was discharged in October 1919. Pearson, was admitted as a Member of VIS in 1940, whilst holding the office of surveyor-general.	
17	Frank William Arter	1952–1967	Arter was Victoria's longest-serving Surveyor-General. He was a Fellow of VIS since the 1940s and a longstanding member of VIS. Arter was also a permanent member of the Institute's committee.	
18	Colin Edward Middleton ISO	1967–1972	Middleton commenced his surveyng career in 1936 at the age of fifteen, joining the then Department of Crown Lands and Survey as an articled trainee. He became a licensed surveyor in October 1946. Thereafter, he went on to specialize in aerial surveying, photogrammetry and mapping, rising to the appointment of chief photogrammetrist in 1964. In May 1967, Middleton was appointed deputy Surveyor-General and in December 1967 he was appointed Surveyor-General. Middleton was also director of mapping during this term. Following his service as Surveyor-General, Middleton was appointed Secretary of Lands in June 1972. Middleton was one of only two Victorian Surveyors-General to be promoted to Secretary of Lands. (The other was Reed.) He was awarded the Imperial Service Order in the 1981 Queen's Birthday Honours for service as Secretary of the Victorian Crown Lands Department. Middleton also served with the Royal Australian Survey Corps (RASVY) during World War 2, enlisting in July 1940 and discharged in 1945. He commenced his service with the 3 Field Survey Company as a Sapper, and after some two years was commissioned in November 1943, with the rank of Lieutenant. He was then posted to 2/1 Topographical Survey Company, where he continued his service and was promoted to Captain and finally discharged in November 1945. Significantly, it was the experience in military mapping in Australia, Papua New Guinea and the Netherlands East Indies that developed his skills in photogrammetry for mapping and surveying. He drew upon his skills and knowledge acquired in the army to advocate photogrammetry for mapping and surveying when he returned to civilian life at the Lands Department. Middleton maintained his connections with army surveying through the Royal Australian Survey Corp (RASVY) Association and also participated in ANZAC Day marches with RASVY veterans well into the 1980s. He was also an active member of the Camberwell Returned Services League (RSL) sub-branch. Middleton was a very active member of the Victorian Division of ISA, serving on various sub-committees over many years. Middleton was appointed a Fellow of ISV upon its incorporation in 2007, having been a Fellow of the former ISA since 1969. ISV continues to honour the contributions of Middleton to surveying with the annual Colin Middleton Lunch. Middleton was also very active with the Australian Photogrammetry Society, serving on its federal executive. he was also an active member of the former Australian Institute of Cartography. Middleton was also a Fellow of the Royal Institute of Public Administration and an Associate Fellow of the Australian Institute of Management.	
29	John Eric Mitchell	1972–1979	Mitchell was a Member of the former ISA and served on the Committee of the Victorian Division during the 1960s. He was also a Councillor to ISA representing the Victorian Division.	
20	Raymond Eden Holmes AM	1979–1988	Holmes joined the Victorian Department of Crown Lands and Survey as a Junior Survey Draftsman, in May 1945, after having finished high school the previous year. In September 1945, he decided he wanted to be a surveyor and he transferred to the Survey Division of State Rivers and Water Commission of Victoria (SR&WSC) as a junior survey chainman and articled pupil surveyor. Holmes attained his registration as a licensed surveyor in October 1949 following his successful completion of articles and the Surveyors Board of Victoria examination. Of particular note is that his period of articles entailed undertaking cadastral surveys and also general water supply engineering surveys which were associated with the construction of Rocklands Reservoir. Over his career at SR&WSC he was promoted to Superintendent Surveyor, in charge of North Central survey zone in 1953 and in 1964 became Superintending Surveyor at SR&WSC Head Office in Melbourne. In 1967 he was promoted to the position of Assistant Chief Surveyor in the SR&WSC. In 1973, Holmes was appointed to the most senior surveying position in SR&WSC, being the Chief Surveyor. In July 1979, Holmes was appointed Surveyor-General, holding the position until his retirement in 1988 at the age of 61. Holmes was also Director of Mapping during this term. Holmes was Victoria's representative on the National Mapping Council of Australia during the period 1979-87. With the creation of the Intergovernmental Committee on Surveying and Mapping (ICSM) in 1988, he became one of the inaugural delegates representing Victoria, until he retired later in 1988. Holmes was Congress Director for the International Federation of Surveyors (FIG) XX Congress, with the theme "Surveying global changes", held in Melbourne, 5–12 March 1994.· The Congress, hosted by the former ISA, was largely under the organization of ISV and Holmes. The Congress was recognized at that time as having the largest number of delegates, more than 1,000, the first to achieve that number and was reported to be the best ever FIG Congress. FIG acknowledged that the success was due to the directorship of Holmes and the support of ISV. The respect for Holmes by the surveying profession continued long after his retirement as Surveyor-General. With the introduction of formal Surveyors Board of Victoria conferral ceremonies for newly licensed surveyors, which was introduced during the term of Keith Bell, Holmes was one of the first invited keynote speakers to deliver the conferral speech, which he did on 9 September 2002. Holmes' speech highlighted the quality of Victoria's cadastral system and the importance of the responsibilities of licensed surveyors. Holmes is acknowledged for his recovery in July 2007 of artefacts from the Burke and Wills expedition, which he donated to the State Library of Victoria. Holmes commenced as a Student Member of VIS in 1946. He was President of ISV in 1975 and in 2016 received a certificate from ISV for seventy years of membership. He was appointed an Honorary Fellow of ISV upon its incorporation in 2007, having been appointed a Fellow of ISA in February 1977 and Honorary Fellow of ISA in April 1988. In 1994, The University of Melbourne awarded Holmes a Doctorate of Surveying Honoris causa for his services to the surveying profession in Victoria and The University of Melbourne. Holmes was appointed as a Member of the Order of Australia in the 2019 Australia Day Honours for "significant service to surveying and mapping, and to professional organisations".	
−	Robert Arthur Eddington (Acting)	1988	Eddington was the acting Surveyor-General and Director of Mapping in 1988, Department of Crown Lands and Survey. Eddington, commenced training to be a survey draftsman in 1959 at the Victorian Land Titles Office under the then Department of Crown Law, and subsequently undertaking the surveying degree at the University of Melbourne. Thereafter he completed surveying articles and was licensed in November 1967. Early in his professional career he engaged in computerization of land titling commencing with a secondment to the New South Wales Registrar-General’s Department Torrens Register Automation Project during 1973-76. Following this, he was the Senior Surveyor with Victoria’s Department of Crown Lands and Survey during 1976-82. Subsequently, he was the Deputy Director LANDATA under the Victorian Department of Planning and Environment (previously the Department of Crown Lands and Survey) 1982-85. Eddington acted as the Deputy Director General of the Department Property and Services during 1985-86 and was then appointed Director of LANDATA 1986-88, before acting as the Surveyor-General in 1988. Edington has been recognized as one of Australia’s early leaders and experts in automation of land titling and computerization of digital cadastre. In 1987, the former Australasian Urban and Regional Information Systems Association (AURISA) appointed Eddington as the 1987 AURISA Eminent Individual. Eddington was a regular speaker and keynote at AURISA's Urban and Regional Planning Information Systems (URPIS) annual conferences during the 1970-1980s. Eddington played a key role in the early efforts of national coordination of land and geospatial information in Australia, representing Victoria 1986-88 on the Australasian Advisory Committee for Land Information (AACLI), which was the technical committee for the Australian Land Information Council later known as the Australian New Zealand Land Information Council (ANZLIC). Eddington chaired AACLI 1987-88. From 1989, Eddington worked primarily as a consultant-expert advisor in land titling supporting international development assistance in Jamaica, Thailand, Zambia, Vietnam, China, Laos, Philippines, Federated States of Micronesia and Nigeria. This included working on World Bank funded projects. Eddington was also a Member of the Victorian Division of ISA for much of his career and received his 50 Year Membership Certificate at the 2015 ISV Surveying Industry Awards Gala Dinner.	
21	John Richard Parker	1989–1998	Parker’s early surveying career was in the private sector of Victoria. He was licensed in July 1964. From 1980-83, he was with the State Electricity Commission of Victoria (SECV), Melbourne and Dandenong as Senior Surveyor and then Supervising Surveyor until appointment as the Chief Surveyor of SECV for the period 1983-89. Parker was appointed Surveyor-General and Director of Mapping in 1989, initially under the Department of Finance (later Department of Treasury and Finance). He held the position of Surveyor-General until May 1998, but lost the role as Director of Mapping from January 1995. By 1995, several statutory responsibilities of the Surveyor-General had been reassigned to other government units. This started with the functions of the Director of Mapping being assigned to the Office of Geographic Data Coordination. By 1996, with the establishment of Land Victoria, OGDC became the Land Information Group, a business unit of Land Victoria. Further responsibilities of the Surveyor-General were transferred to Land Victoria business units, viz. Land Information Group (mapping, geodetic, survey control and calibration standards) and Land Registry (Crown Land Records). Land Victoria was a new Division, under the then Department of Natural Resources and Environment. With these reassignments, what was left under the Surveyor-General was the regulation of land surveying, including the secretariat of the then Surveyors Board of Victoria. Parker was given the additional title of Director Service & Industry Standards. After stepping down as Surveyor-General, Parker was appointed as the Registrar of Geographic Names Victoria 1998 until June 2000. He also undertook other related representative roles including the chair of the Committee for Geographical Names in Australasia (CGNA) and Chairman of the Asia South-East, Pacific South-West Division of the United Nations Group of Experts on Geographical Names (UNGEGN). For his work on Toponymy, the study of place names, and support for the Australian Place Names Project of Macquarie University's Linguistics Dept, he was appointed as an Honorary Professor in Linguistics. Parker also chaired Commission 1, Professional Standards and Practice, of the International Federation of Surveyors (FIG) for the 1998–2002 term. Parker was a Member of the Victorian Division of ISA, but discontinued after his FIG term ended. In addition, he is reported to have consulted on land administration to the World Bank and other development agencies. His international experience is reported to have included Indonesia, China, Laos, El Salvador, Greece, Colombia, Costa Rica and Hong Kong.	
−	Barrie Bremner; and; Alan Fennell; (Acting)	1998–1999	Bremner and Fennell acted in the position of Surveyor-General during this period. Bremner commenced his surveying training with the Department of Lands in 1963 and initially worked mainly in East Gippsland and studied at Royal Melbourne Institute of Technology (RMIT). After a period of time he was able to move to the Land Titles Office to further his experience before he opted for the private sector. By 1970, he moved to work for Licensed Surveyor Peter Peyton and upon obtaining his license in August 1974, went to into partnership with Peyton establishing the firm Peyton Bremner for the next thirteen years. In 1987, he returned to the Land Titles Office and in 1993 he was appointed the Titles Office Surveyor and Chief Draughtsman. Under Section 4 of the Surveyors Act 1978, he also assumed the position of Deputy Chair of the Surveyors Board of Victoria and continued in that role for eleven years until the new Surveyors Registration Board of Victoria was established under the 2004 Surveyors Act, which commenced in 2005. He continued on SRBV until he retired in 2008. With Parker's departure from the Surveyor-General's position in May 1998, Bremner acted in the position for around six months and then returned to his substantive position in the Land Registry. Alan Fennell, the Deputy Surveyor-General, became the acting Surveyor-General until Bell commenced in July 1999. Bremner remained an active Member of the Victorian Division of ISA which he joined in 1976, and then ISV for the rest of his life, dying in 2018. He served on ISV's committee from 2006 to 2009. He was advanced to Fellow of ISV in 2013. Bremner was very committed to the education and training of land surveyors. This included his time on both SBV and SRVB examining projects and mentoring candidate surveyors. Also, after retiring from the Land Registry he undertook teaching of cadastral surveying at both the University of Melbourne and RMIT University for around five years until 2014 and continued to take a role in the annual assessments of final year students. Fennell was licensed as a surveyor in Victoria in December 1965. He spent his career in Crown Lands and Survey (and as re-named under government re-organizations). Prior to commencing as acting Surveyor-General in late 1998, Fennell was the Deputy Director, Valuation and Survey Services under Land Victoria. Fennell reverted to deputy Surveyor-General upon the appointment of Bell in July 1999 and retired in 2000.	
22	Keith Clifford Bell AM	1999–2003	Bell was reported to have been the youngest Surveyor-General appointed since Clarke. Prior to being appointed, he was with the Australian Capital Territory Government and earlier the Commonwealth Government. Bell was first licensed as a surveyor in Queensland in 1984 and also qualified as a Chartered Professional Engineer (civil). Bell’s initial focus was on regulatory reform of surveying and improving governance. Although the development of a new Surveyors Act was completed by late 2001, it was only passed after his term (Surveyors Act 2004). Early in his tenure, he identified governance issues concerning the transfer of statutory responsibilities to other units of Land Victoria. He was able to have some functions returned to his office during his tenure. However, other key functions such as survey control, geodetic surveying and measurement calibration were returned to the Surveyor-General after his term. He was also concerned with the aging profile of licensed surveyors and the low number of candidates entering training agreements to become licensed. With the Board, he worked in collaboration with the surveying profession to increase the number of graduates entering training for licensing and also to promote surveying to women. In June 2000, Bell was also appointed Registrar of Geographic Names and was very proactive with dual naming especially to support indigenous heritage. Bell’s intergovernmental contributions included his proposal for the establishment of the Council of the Reciprocating Surveyors Boards of Australia and New Zealand (CRSBANZ) at the 2nd Trans-Tasman Surveyors Conference in Queenstown, New Zealand in August 2000 and subsequently being appointed as the inaugural Chair for 2001-03. As a member of the Intergovernmental Surveying Committee on Surveying and Mapping (ICSM), Bell proposed a Permanent Committee on Cadastral Reform which was established in 1999 and he was the Chair for 1999-2003. After resigning as Surveyor-General in July 2003, Bell joined the World Bank. He led the East Asia Pacific Region program for land administration and geospatial information until 2017 and also advised in other regions, working in more than forty-five countries. He also led and advised on programs for disaster response and reconstruction as well as on programs in conflict and war countries and is recognised as one of the architects of Building Back Better conceived in 2005 and also one of the originators in 2014 of Fit-for-Purpose Land Administration, jointly under FIG and the World Bank. Bell represented the former Victorian Division of ISA as a Councilor 2000-03. He also arranged for vice-regal patronage of the Victorian Division with the then Governor John Landy. Bell was appointed a Fellow of ISV upon its incorporation in 2007, having been a Fellow of ISA since 2000. He was the Australian delegate to FIG Commission 7, Cadastre and Land Management, 1999-2004. Bell was also appointed Fellow of both the Institution of Engineers Australia (1999) and the American Society of Civil Engineers (2011). In 2003, RMIT University awarded Bell a Doctor of Applied Science Honoris Causa for “leadership of change in land administration governance, geospatial sciences, and surveying in Australia”. His international development service was recognized with several awards including the Medal of the Order of Merit (Vietnam, 2015) and the High State Medal of Ghazi Mir Bacha Khan (Afghanistan, 2018). Bell was appointed a Member of the Order of Australia in the 2022 Queen's Birthday Honours (Australia) for "significant service to surveying, to geospatial information, and to humanitarian operations."	
23	John Ernest Tulloch	2003–2017		
−	David Boyle (Acting)	2017	Boyle acted as Surveyor-General after the retirement of Tulloch in 2017, while the position remained vacant until the successor was appointed. He had also acted on many occasions for short periods when the appointed Surveyor-General was on leave. He was substantively the Deputy Surveyor-General since 2004, with the key responsibilities of oversight of the state's cadastral and geodetic surveying programs as well managing the business functions of the Surveyor-General’s office. Prior to commencing as a senior surveyor in the Surveyor-General’s office in 2003 during Bell’s term, Boyle worked in the private sector of Victoria and also government. Boyle graduated with a degree in surveying from RMIT in 1975 and was licensed in October 1978. Boyle served on the Surveyors Registration Board of Victoria from 5 May 2010 to 1 December 2017 as the Licensed Surveyor member representing the government and as provided for in the amended Surveyors Act 2004. Boyle succeeded Bremner on the Board. Boyle was appointed a Fellow of ISV in 2018 after decades of membership of the Victorian Division of ISA and ISV.	
24	Craig Leslie Sandy	2017–present	On 1 May 2014, Sandy was appointed Surveyor-General for the Northern Territory of Australia, a role he held until his appointment in Victoria. In 2015, Sandy was elected to the role of chair of the Council of Reciprocating Surveyors Boards of Australia and New Zealand, a role he held until March 2020. In 2019, Sandy was awarded the Asia Pacific Spatial Excellence Awards (APSEA), Spatial Professional of the Year for Victoria, and in 2020 he became the Oceanic APSEA Spatial Professional of the Year for 2019. In March 2020, Sandy was appointed as chair of the Intergovernmental Committee on Surveying and Mapping (ICSM), following a term as co-deputy chair.	
