= Robert L. J. Ellery =

English-Australian astronomer and public servant

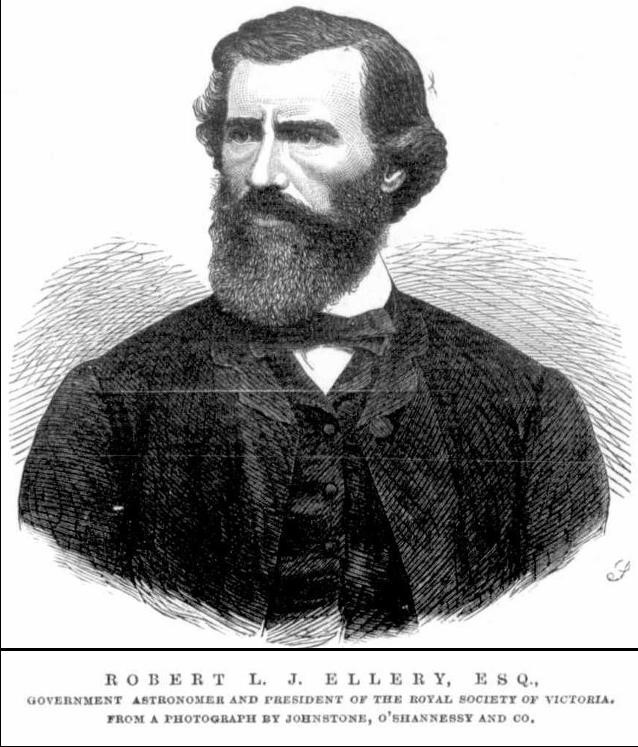
Portrait of Robert L. J. Ellery

Robert Lewis John Ellery CMG FRS FRAS (14 July 1827 – 14 January 1908) was an English-Australian astronomer and public servant who served as Victorian government astronomer for 42 years.

== Early life ==
Ellery was born in Cranleigh, Surrey, England, the son of John Ellery, a surgeon, and his wife Caroline, née Potter. Ellery was educated at the local grammar school and qualified as a medical practitioner working as a surgeon in London until 1851. Ellery developed an early interest in practical astronomy and meteorology and sought relaxation from his medical studies in those branches of science, occasionally working as an amateur at England's principal observatories. Friends at Greenwich Observatory encouraged him and he had some access to instruments there.

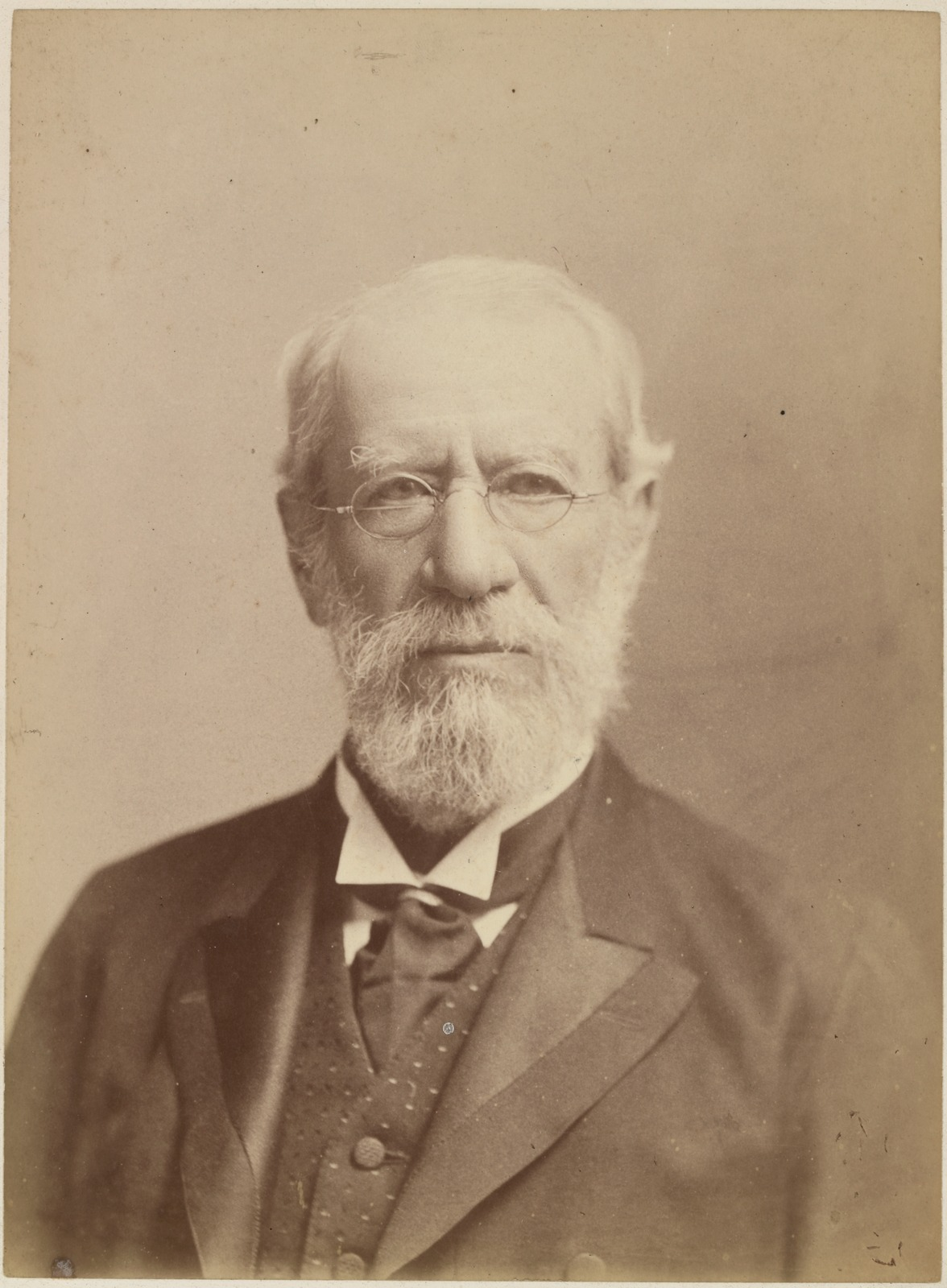
Photograph of Robert Lewis John Ellery

== Career ==
Ellery sailed for Victoria in 1851 aboard the Moselle, attracted by the discovery of gold and the opportunity to practice astronomy and meteorology. Upon arrival, Ellery established a medical practice from his residence at the top end of Bourke Street, Melbourne, Victoria. In 1853 the Victorian government invited him to establish and manage an observatory at Gellibrand's Point (now Williamstown), Victoria, appointing him as Superintendent for the purposes of commercial astronomy. Ellery's key duty was to determine precise local mean time for the masters of vessels to correct their chronometers in Hobson's Bay, which by that time had become rapidly crowded with shipping [due to the Victorian Gold Rush]. The astronomical observatory provided a service to shipping, whose navigators relied critically on accurate astronomical time for determination of their longitude and appreciated the opportunity to synchronise their chronometers. Ellery had already established a reputation as an astronomer and in July 1853 was put in charge of the facility.

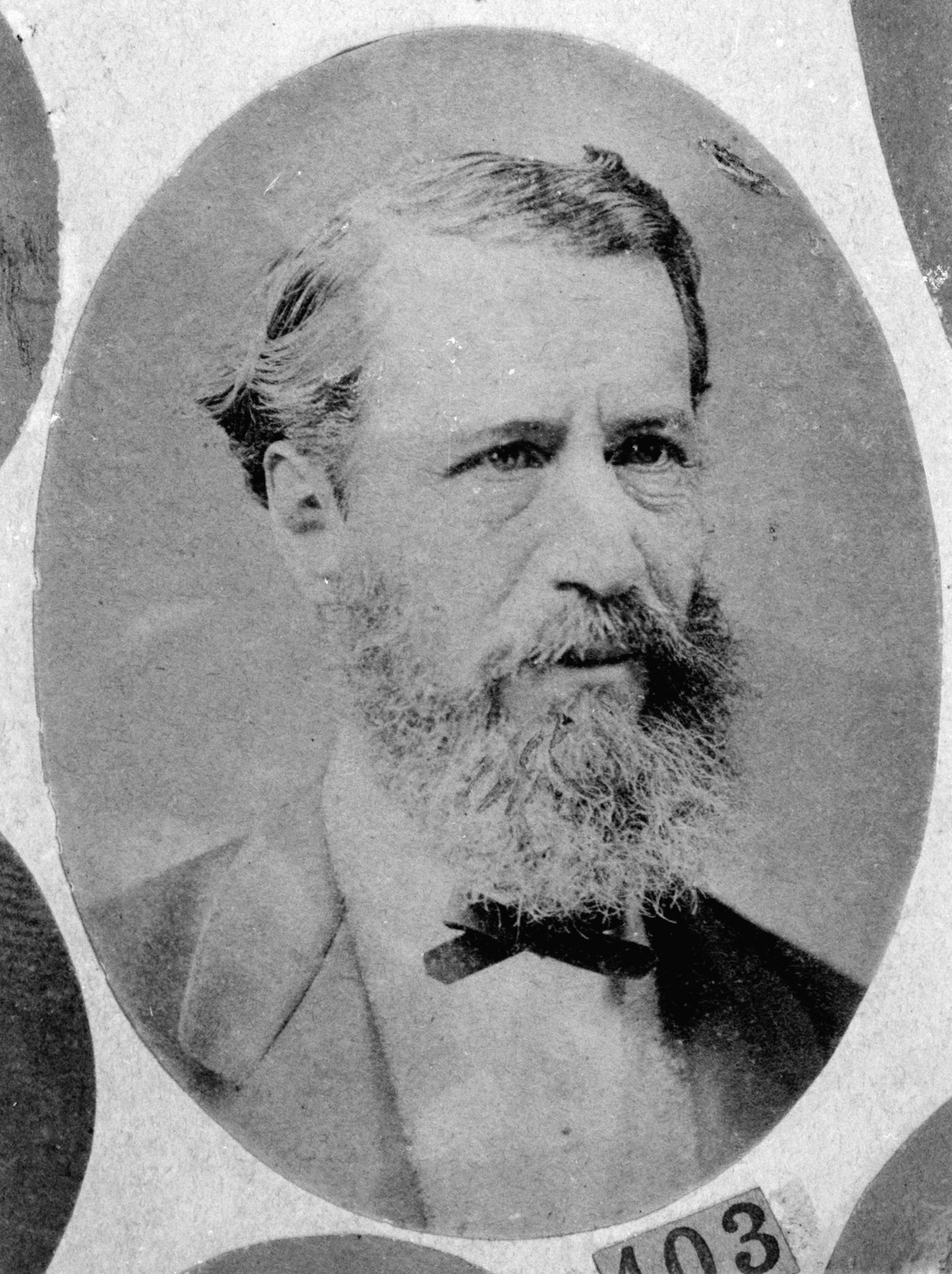
Photograph of Robert L.J. Ellery

When the Williamstown and Melbourne telegraph lines was erected in 1854, the Williamstown end was also placed under Ellery's charge. Ellery's workload was not heavy.

In 1856 Ellery began a geodetic survey of Victoria which was not completed until 1874. In 1858, he was appointed to be a Land Surveyor in the Victorian Government Department of Public Lands, in addition to his duties as Superintendent of the Astronomical Observatory at Gellibrand's Point. He was further appointed to Superintend the geodetic survey of Victoria by the Surveyor General of Victoria Charles Whybrow Ligar.

In 1863 Ellery was appointed to the Board of Examiners for the Department of Lands and Survey.

Ellery resolved the issues he had with the telescope by applying his mechanical ability to the problems involved. Ellery had an able assistant in Ebenezer Farie Macgeorge (born 1836), who had been his surveyor in 1867 when he defined the boundary between South Australia and New South Wales, then replaced Albert Le Sueur as his observer, serving from 1870 to 1872. In March 1871 he reported to the Royal Society of Victoria that since Le Sueur's polishing of the Great Melbourne Telescope the chief limitation to observation was the atmosphere, not the instrument.

Ellery was a founding member of The Institution of Surveyors Victoria established in 1874, and served as its first President (1874-1877), after Surveyor General Alexander John Skene declined the office due to pressure of public business. He was elected Fellow of the Victorian Institute of Surveyors in 1877, the first to be awarded the honour.

== Later life ==
Ellery a keen apiarist and was the first president of the Victorian Beekeepers' Club in 1885, and edited the Australian Beekeepers' Journal.

He was married twice: in 1853 to Amy Shields, a daughter of Dr John Shields of Launceston, Tasmania; she died in 1856, and in 1858 he married her sister, Margaret. He was survived by his widow and a daughter.

Ellery was awarded the Clarke Medal by the Royal Society of New South Wales in 1889. Mount Ellery in Antarctica was named after him in 1886.

== Bibliography ==
- Serle, Percival (1949). "Ellery, Robert Lewis John". Dictionary of Australian Biography. Sydney: Angus & Robertson.
- S. C. B. Gascoigne, 'Ellery, Robert Lewis John (1827–1908)', Australian Dictionary of Biography, Volume 4, MUP, 1972, pp 135–137. Retrieved 12 October 2008

Awards
Preceded by Julian Tenison Woods	Clarke Medal; 1889	Succeeded by George Bennett
