= Maria Elise Allman Marchant =

New Zealand school principal (1869–1919)

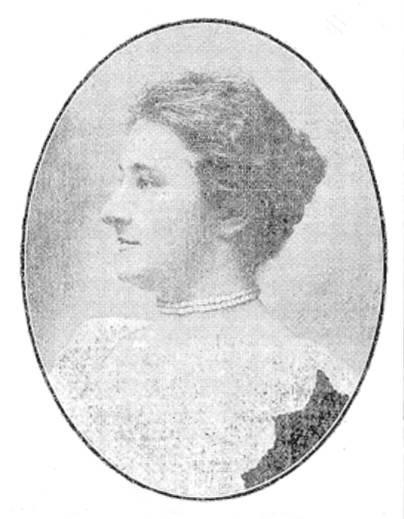
Ella Marchant

Maria Elise Allman Marchant, also known as Ella Allman-Marchant (28 October 1869–15 November 1919) was a New Zealand school principal.

She was born in Wellington, New Zealand, one of eleven children of John William Allman Marchant, who later became Surveyor-General of New Zealand. She attended Wellington Girls' High School, where she was dux in 1887. While working full-time as a teacher in Wellington she studied off-campus through Canterbury College and graduated BA in 1892 and MA in 1894.

She served as principal of Otago Girls' High School from 1895 to 1911. She resigned in order to dedicate herself to the cause of religious education. From 1915 to 1917 she was the first headmistress of St Mary's Diocesan School in Stratford. She then ran a hostel in Christchurch and was the acting headmistress of St John's Girls' School in Invercargill at the time of her sudden death in November 1919.
