= Raymond Holmes =

Raymond Holmes may refer to:

- Ray Holmes (1914–2005), British Royal Air Force pilot
- Raymond Holmes (surveyor), Australian surveyor
