= Albert Le Sueur =

Adolphus Albert Le Sueur (8 December 1849 – 25 April 1906), often known as Albert Le Sueur, was an astronomer known for his early involvement with the Great Melbourne Telescope and his preliminary use of astronomical spectroscopy. This information seems to be at odds with official records Adolphus Albert Le Sueur (as listed) was born and died on this dates but for him to Matriculated in 1859 means he would have been 10 years old which seems debatable. Also official documents of Adolphus' show his parents were Phillipe Le Sueur and Rachel Bazin .Therefore additional research needs to be done to confirm the link between Adolphus and Albert - it seems they are separate people.

== Life ==
Adolphus Albert Le Sueur was born on 8 December 1849, the son of John Le Sueur, a mercer, of Jersey. He matriculated at the University of Cambridge in 1859, being admitted to Pembroke College, where he was a scholar. After graduating with a Bachelor of Arts degree as 21st wrangler in 1863, he trained in astronomy under John Couch Adams at a local observatory. In 1866, he was invited to oversee the construction of the Great Melbourne Telescope at the Grubb factory in Dublin. Le Sueur wrote that he felt he had little "special knowledge" in the field of astronomy, but would endeavour to prove himself capable to his clients. In the meantime, he was coached in celestial photography by Warren de la Rue and immersed himself in the intricacies of building the telescope. In 1868, he supervised its transportation to and erection in Melbourne; despite being a talented astronomer, drawer and photographer, he clashed with Robert Ellery, the telescope's director, and returned home in 1870. His successor was Farie Macgeorge, who proved LeSueur's work had transformed the denigrated telescope into a first-class instrument. Le Sueur's observations were amongst preliminary attempts at using astronomical spectroscopy. After returning to Jersey, the remaining trajectory of his life is largely unclear and it does appear that he made further observations. He married in 1875 and died on 25 April 1906, aged 58.
