= Taranaki Diocesan School for Girls =

- old seal for St Mary's Diocesan School

Location
- Broadway; Stratford 4332; New Zealand; 39.3322°S 174.2798°E

Information
- Type: Integrated single sex secondary (Year 9-13)
- Motto: Fiat Voluntas Tua – Thy Will Be Done
- Established: 1914
- Ministry of Education Institution no.: 180
- Principal: Maria Taylor
- Enrolment: 101 (July 2026)
- Website: www.taranakidio.school.nz

Taranaki Diocesan School for Girls (formerly known as St Mary's Diocesan School) is an all-girls Anglican secondary school in Stratford, New Zealand. Taranaki Dio has a boarding hostel, and the majority of the students at the school are boarders.

The school was founded in 1914 with the first classes in 1915 and a roll of 22 pupils. The foundation stone for new buildings on the current Broadway site was laid in 1918 as the school roll was growing. The chapel was completed in 1956 its construction being largely undertaken by the staff and girls.

School principals have included: Ella Marchant (1915–1917), Mary Fleming (1917–1918), Edith Stanford (1918–1926), Ethel Wilson (1926–1944), Elizabeth Roberton (1950–?), Marjorie Bruce, Rev David Tonkin, Rosamund Robertshawe, Geraldine Travers, Susan Stevens, Lynley Rawston, Fiona Green (2013–2020), Matt Coleman (2021–2023) and Maria Taylor (2023–).

The school celebrated its 90th jubilee in 2004 and centenary in 2014.

In 2018 St Mary's was renamed as Taranaki Diocesan School for Girls and the chapel rededicated to be known as the Chapel of St Mary. Its Māori name is Te Kura o Pi’opatanga o W’akaa’urangi.
