= John Walter Osborne =

- Born: 20 February 1828; Ireland
- Died: 20 November 1902 (aged 74)

John Walter Osborne (20 February 1828 – 20 November 1902) was a chemist and engineer born in Ireland, who migrated to Victoria, Australia and in Melbourne pioneered the art of photo-lithography.

== History ==
Osborne was born in Ireland, and received an excellent education. He emigrated to Melbourne with his wife Anne on the Peru, listed as "engineer" (though he was later described as an analytical chemist), arriving on Christmas Day 1852.

In 1857 he was employed as an assistant to Professor George Neumayer at the Flagstaff Hill magnetic observatory, a project funded by the King of Bavaria. In February 1859 he left to take up a position with the Crown Lands Office (Survey Department of the Office of Crown Lands and Survey), and was replaced by W. J. Wills (shortly to become a famous explorer). It is likely that Osborne had photolithography in mind when he joined the department, and it shows considerable faith in the project by its head Charles W. Ligar that Dallmeyer of London was commissioned to produce the large lens required, at a cost of £250.

In September 1859 he applied for a patent for "obtaining lithographic impressions with the aid of photography" In December he read to the Philosophical Institute of Victoria, of which he was a member, a paper entitled "Description of a new photo lithographic process". Dr. Ligar, director of the Survey Office and Surveyor-General of Victoria, followed with an endorsement of the system, noting the immense saving of time in having new plans duplicated.

Before the advent of photolithography, plans (which may have measured 6 by 6 feet (1.8 m × 1.8 m) were reproduced painstakingly by draughtsmen to 1/2 or 1/3 scale onto prepared stone slabs, a process which could take days or weeks. In most cases the expense in preparing a copy was so great that the stone, which could weigh 100 pounds (45 kg) was stored against the need for future re-use. The cost and logistics of conserving, storing and retrieving thousands of lithographic stones was of course immense; add to that the cost of the stones – £5 each, perhaps $1000 in today's values – and the virtue of saving the artwork onto glass photographic plates maybe 6 inches (150 mm) square, and having half-a-dozen stones in stock, which could be cleaned, prepared, and photographically embossed over and over again, being resurfaced as required, becomes obvious. The time lost in preparing the stones went from days or weeks to hours, the likelihood of error normally attendant in manual copying reduced to practically zero, and scaling preserved perfectly.

Implementation of his invention was opposed by professional lithographers, as it threatened their livelihood, and a Parliamentary Board was appointed to look into the advisability and applicability of the process. In their report of January 1861 they recommended adoption of the process in the Survey Department, an increase in salary for Osborne, and grants to both him and his assistant.

The time saved by Osborne's process was of great benefit to the Crown Lands Department, which was under pressure from developers during the land boom of the 1850s. Osborne was paid £1000 by the Survey Office for the Australian rights to his invention, and his assistant Duncan McHutchison received £200. In March 1862 Osborne left for Europe to exploit his invention there, but found the patents already acquired by someone else. He then proceeded to America, where he set up a studio in New York and sold his rights to The American Photolithographic Company. He later moved to Palo Alto, California, here he died. His wife survived him but they had no children.
