= Raymond Holmes (surveyor) =

Australian surveyor (1928–2020)

Raymond Eden Holmes AM
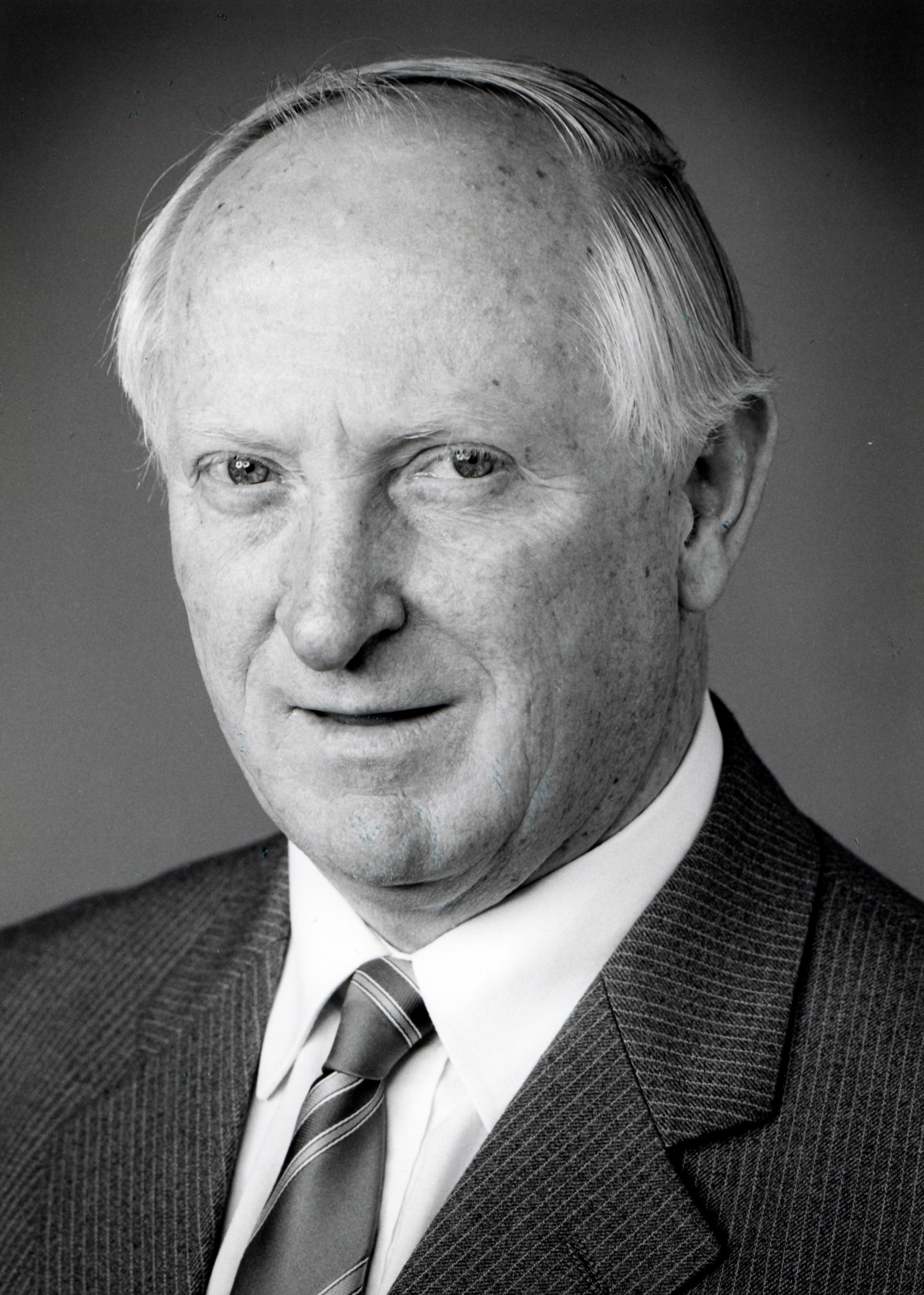
- Surveyor General of Victoria
- Born: 2 January 1928; Dromana Bushnursing Hospital
- Died: 22 November 2020 (aged 92)
- Occupation: Surveyor
- Spouse(s): Kathleen Jean (Pat) Holmes, nee Burton
- Children: Jenifer McAuley & Jillian Holmes-Smith
- Parent(s): William John (Jack) Holmes & Sylvia Tallents

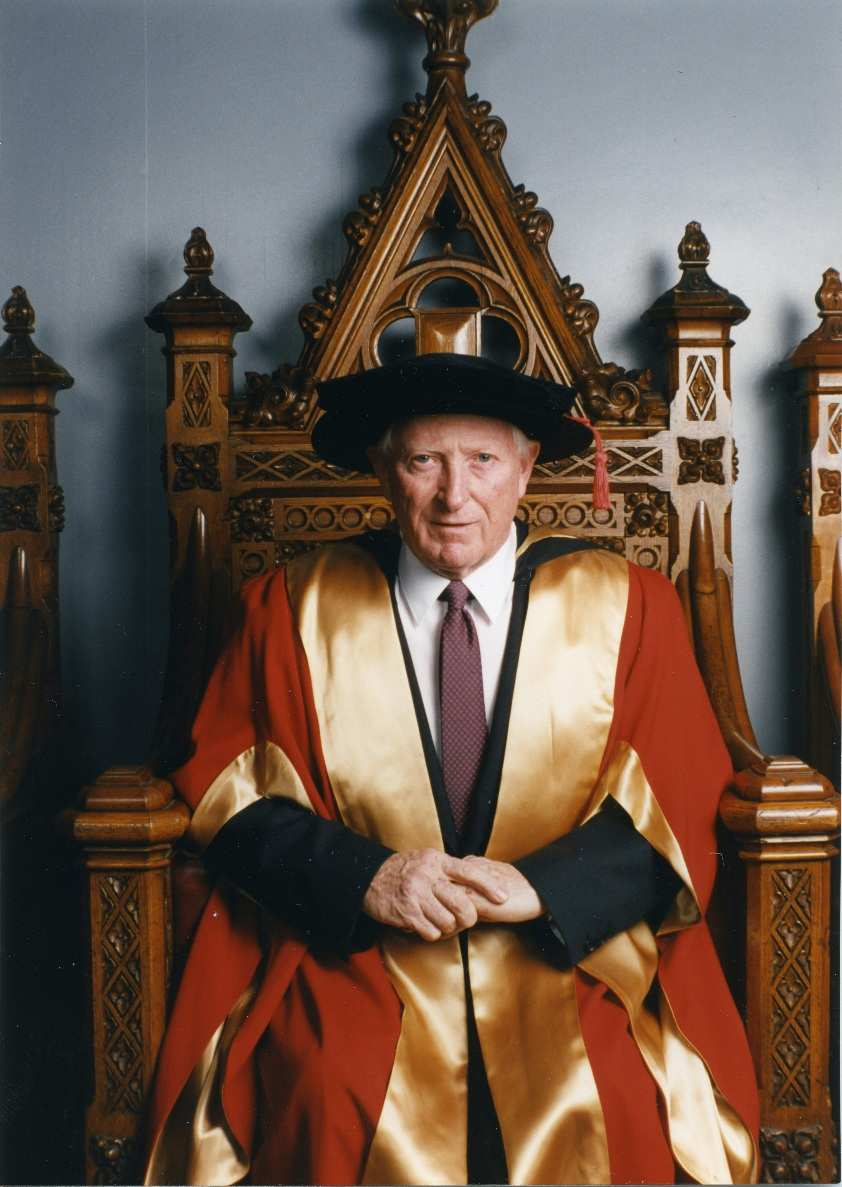
Raymond Holmes, Doctor of Surveying Honoris Cause

Dr. Raymond Eden Holmes AM was an Australian surveyor. He was the Surveyor General of Victoria from 1979 to 1988 and appointed as a Member of the Order of Australia in the 2019 Australia Day Honours for "significant service to surveying and mapping, and to professional organisations". Holmes was also acknowledged for his recovery in July 2007 of artefacts from the Burke and Wills expedition, which he donated to the State Library of Victoria.

In 1994, The University of Melbourne awarded Holmes a Doctorate of Surveying Honoris Causa for his services to the surveying profession in Victoria and the university. Following his retirement as Surveyor General, Holmes worked as a consultant to both the World Bank and the United Nations Food and Agriculture Organization as an expert adviser on land administration. Holmes died on 22 November 2020.

== Early years ==
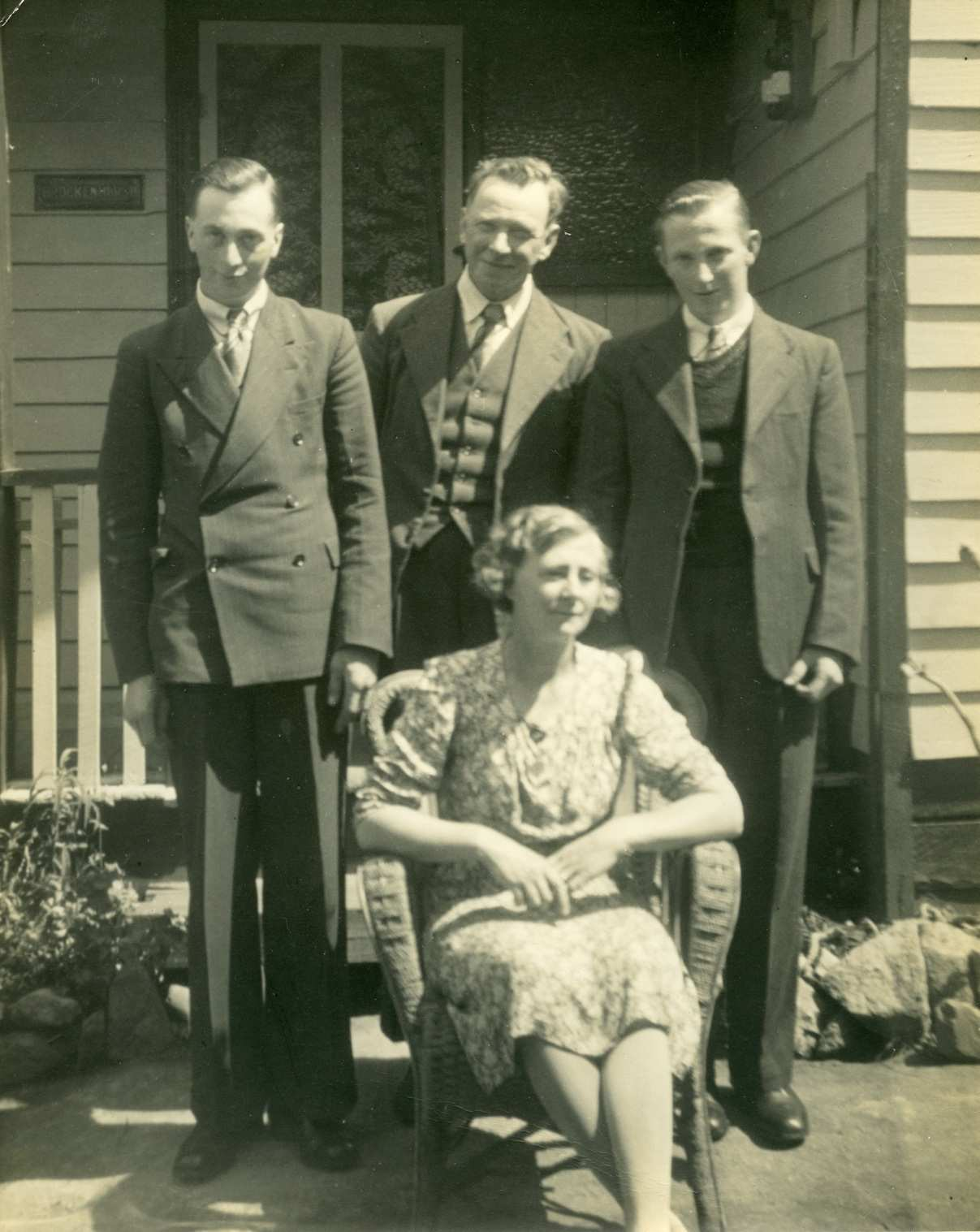
Ray with brother and parents

Holmes was born on 2 January 1928 in Dromana, Victoria. His grandfather was an early settler who had taken up farmland at Red Hill in early 1860. His childhood was spent on the family's farm, which gave him a good foundation for his future work, particularly at the State Rivers and Water Commission of Victoria (SR&WSC).

He was educated at Frankston High School, gaining his Leaving Certificate in December 1944. In May 1945, he joined the Victorian State Government in the Department of Crown Land and Surveys as a Junior Survey Draftsman, where he decided to commence his training to become a Licensed Surveyor.

== State Rivers and Water Commission of Victoria (SR&WC) ==
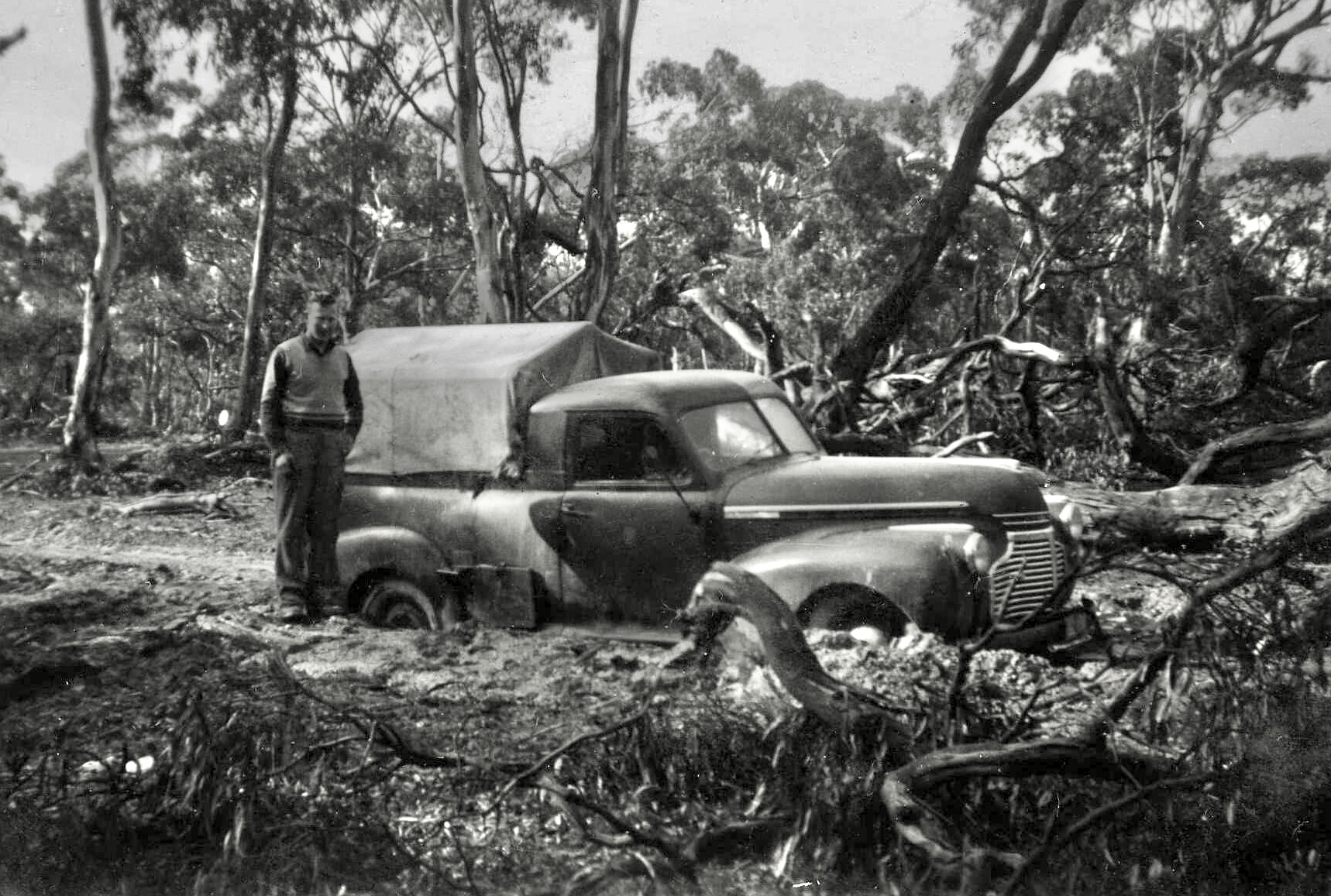
Raymond Holmes with bogged utility, 1946

In September 1945, he transferred to the Survey Division of SR&WSC as a Junior Survey Chainman and Articled Pupil Surveyor. He undertook his articles under the supervision of Mr. G. Ficke at Kerang between 1945 and 1949. During this time, he worked on general water supply engineering and cadastral surveys associated with irrigation and the construction of the Rocklands Reservoir. In October 1949, he completed his examinations with the Surveyors Board of Victoria and became a Licensed Surveyor.

From 1946 onwards he worked at a number of SR&WSC offices, including in the Western District, Mildura, the Bellarine Peninsula and Heyfield. Between 1950 and 1953, he was engaged in the Crown Land subdivisions creating Soldier Settlements in Gippsland.

In 1953, he was promoted to the position of Superintendent Surveyor, in charge of the new North Central survey zone. In this position, he supervised surveys and assisted with design details for a major part of Victoria's irrigation systems (including the Goulburn system). He also made a close study of the best practice in the design of farm irrigation systems and of hydrographic measurement methods. He regularly provided in his own time and advice to farmers to improve the efficiency of their irrigation practices.

In 1964, he was transferred to the newly created role of Superintending Surveyor at SR&WSC Head Office in Melbourne, where his duties included responsibility for the operation of the entire Hydrographic Survey Section. During this time, he completed a postgraduate course in Engineering Hydrology at the University of NSW. In 1967 he was promoted to the position of Assistant Chief Surveyor in the SR&WSC.

He was a member of the Australian Water Resources Council Technical Committee on Surface Water from 1966 to 1979, and he served as its chairman between 1972 and 1977.

In 1973, Holmes was appointed Chief Surveyor of the SR&WSC, he was in charge of more than 200 field survey, hydrographic survey and drafting staff. This was the largest survey organisation in Victoria, at that time.

== Ethiopian Aid Project ==
In 1970 and 1971, he led groups of specially selected personnel to Ethiopia. The volunteers, came mainly from the SR&WSC and the Australian Agriculture Department. They were tasked with assisting the Ethiopian Government in the development of a new irrigation areas and with improving the existing systems in the Awash Valley. His role in this project was as an expert Surveyor and Hydrologist. In addition to organising the survey of 160,000 acres (64,000 hectares) of farmlands, he also reviewed the existing irrigation network and the associated hydrographic infrastructure and made recommendations for its improvement. Holmes was selected for this task as a mark of his standing within the SR&WSC. This project was carried out and under the authority of the United Nations Food and Agriculture Authority, and was financed by the World Bank.

== Surveyor General of Victoria ==
In July 1979, Holmes was appointed to the role of Surveyor-General of Victoria. He was Victoria's 22nd Surveyor-General and he held this position as head of the survey profession until his retirement in 1988. The role also included responsibilities as the Chairman of the Surveyors Board of Victoria, and as a member of the Victorian Electoral Boundaries Commissions and as a Commissioner for Redistribution of Federal Electoral Boundaries.

== Institution of Surveyors Australia and the Institution of Surveyors Victoria ==
Holmes also carried out leadership roles particularly in the Victorian Division of the Institution of Surveyors Australia (ISA) of which he was a foundation member. He was Victorian President in 1975, and a National Councillor from 1976 to 1991. Holmes was President of ISA 1985–86. He joined the Institution of Surveyors Victoria (ISV) as a pupil surveyor in 1946. After becoming a Licensed Surveyor, he was elevated to Corporate (full) membership in 1950.

In recognition of his service to the Institution, he was elevated to the rank of Fellow in February 1977 and to Honorary Fellow in April 1988. He continued his service to the Institution for many years, even after his retirement from full-time employment. In 2016 he received a 70 Year Membership Certificate.

== FIG Congress ==
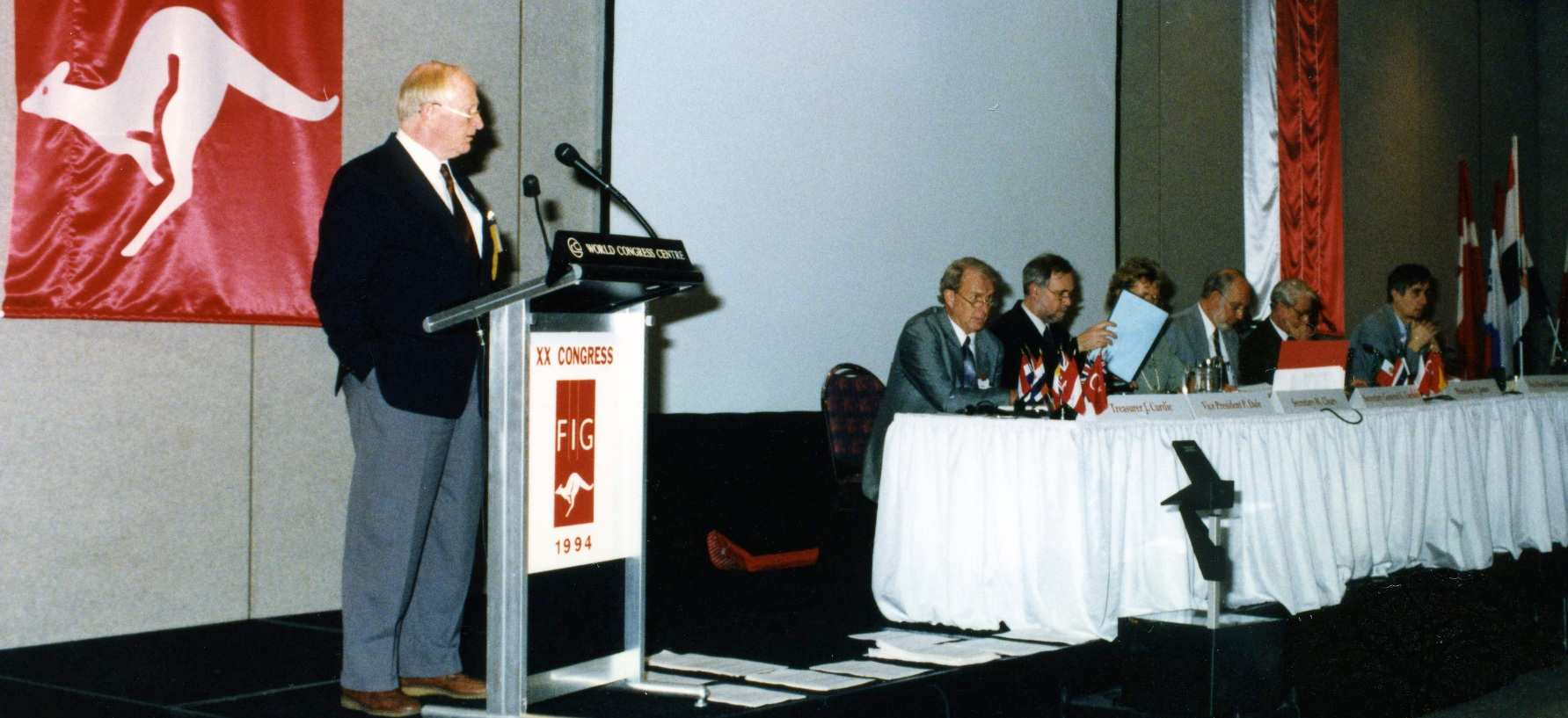
1994 World FIG Congress opening

In 1992, he led an overseas delegation representing the ISA, which resulted in Melbourne winning the right to host the International Federation of Surveyors (FIG) World Congress in 1994. In organising this bid he made good use of the contacts he had previously made within international surveying community as Victoria's Surveyor-General, the World Bank and the United Nations Food and Agriculture Organization (FAO). Holmes was appointed the FIG Congress Manager (unpaid) for the 1994 World FIG Congress. The FIG Congress was attended by over 1,000 people representing close to 100 countries from around the world. It was the first time that a southern hemisphere nation has had the honour of hosting this prestigious event. The congress was a comprehensive success and a number of visitors from other countries commented that it was the best event they had attended, and that Melbourne could be proud of its presentation.

== Burke and Wills expedition ==
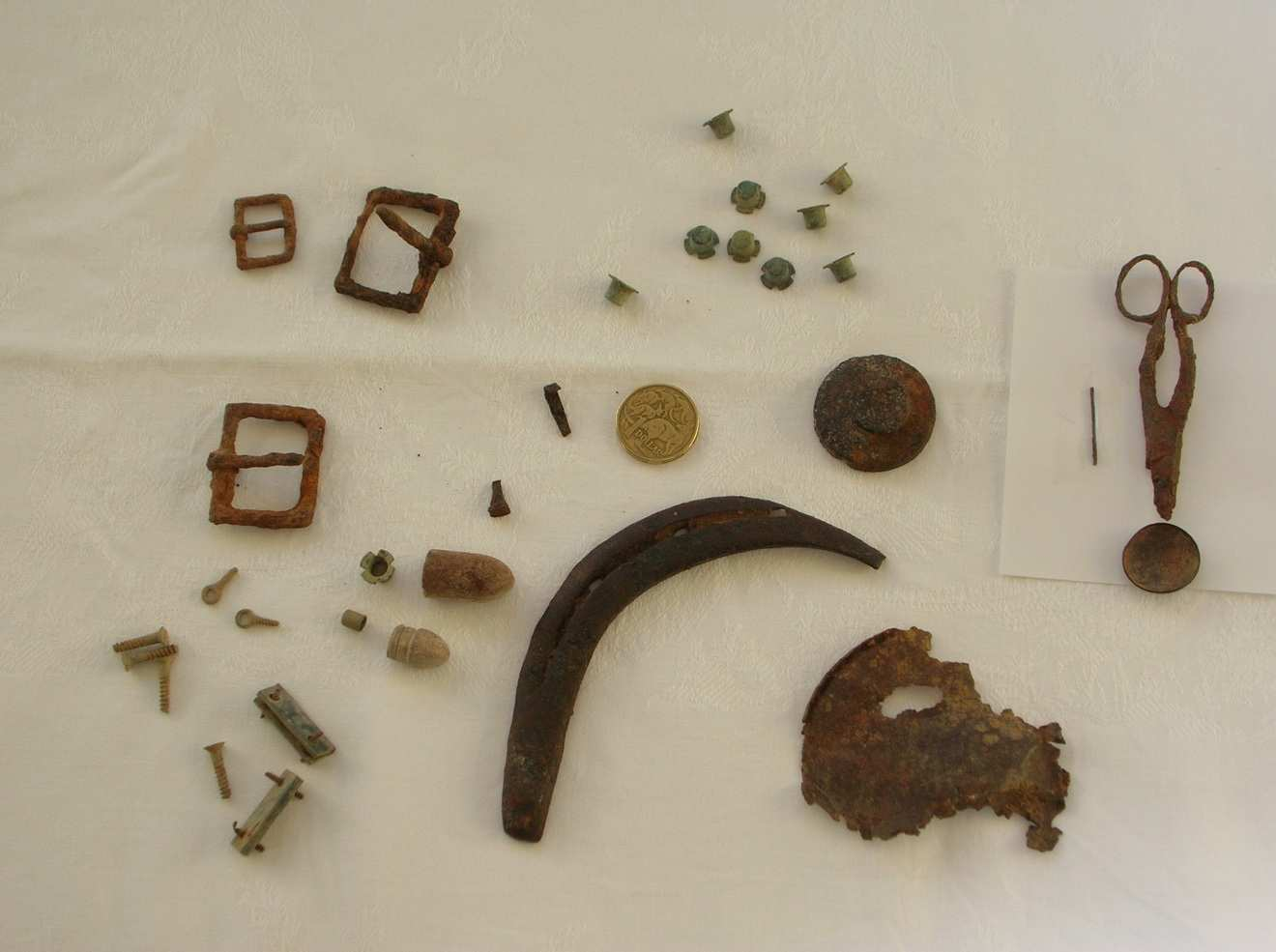
Artifacts found at Plant Camp site

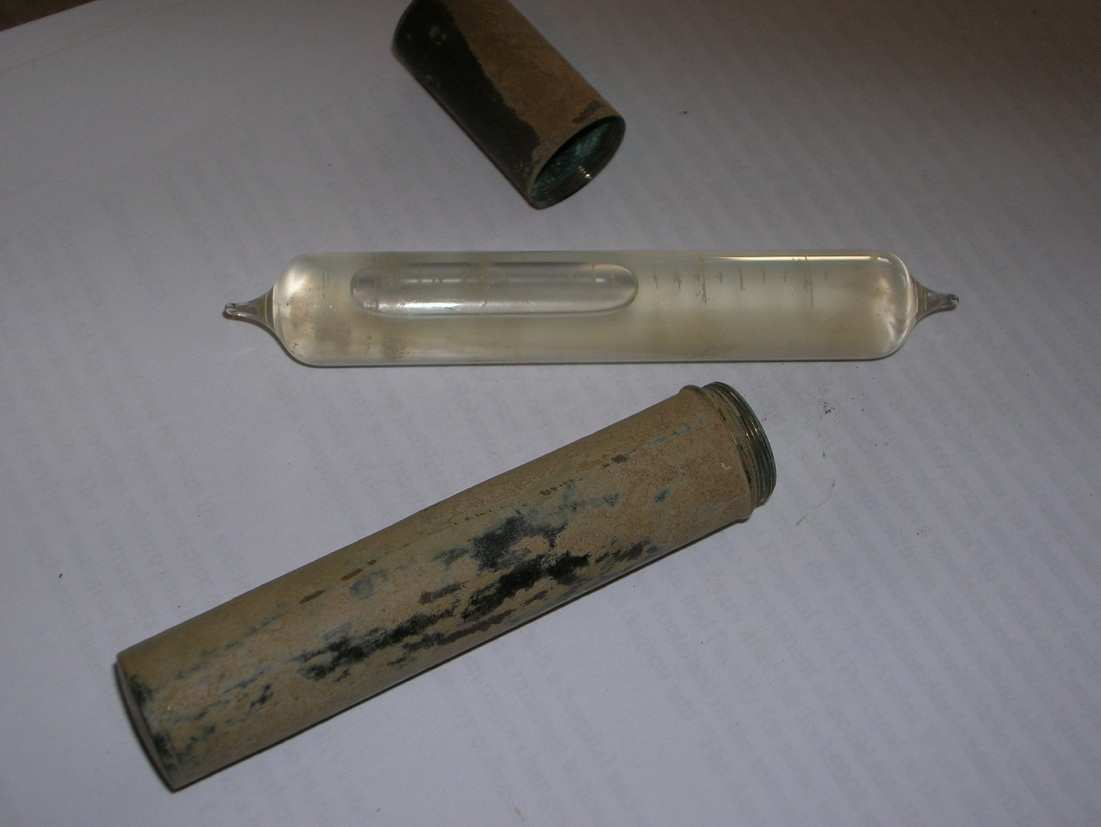
Spirit level from Burke and Wills expedition

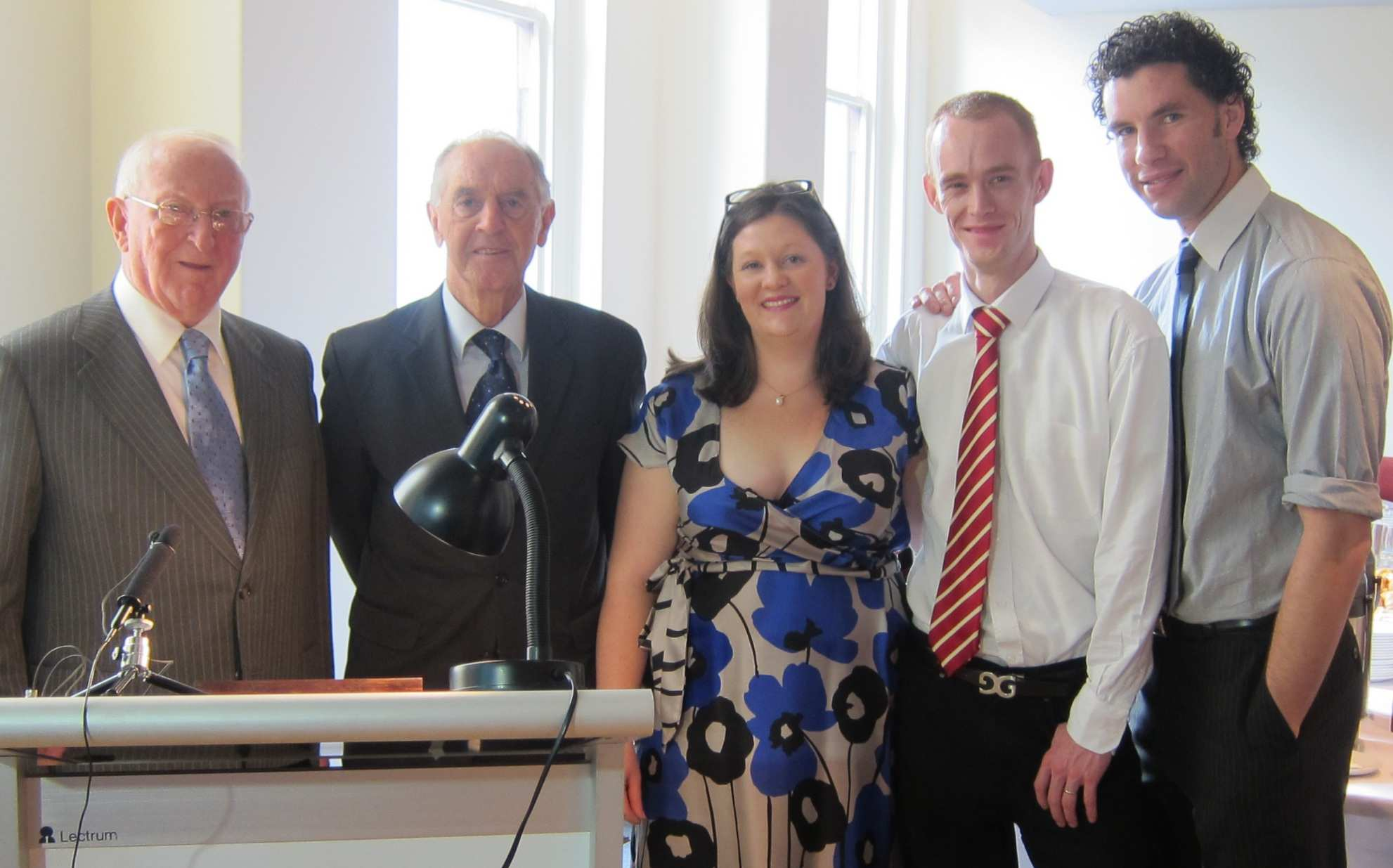
Presentation of the artefacts to the State Library of Victoria

In 2007 and 2008, Holmes led expeditions that located Plant Camp, where explorers Robert O'Hara Burke and William John Wills buried their navigational equipment and other possessions on 3 April 1861, just days before heading south in a doomed attempt to find their support party. The Camp was located on an isolated creek bed on a Kidman pastoral lease in Western Queensland. Found buried in about three centimetres of riverbed mud was a brass case with a spirit level that was identified as belonging to the expedition's surveyor and astronomer Wills, along with other artefacts that included a pair of scissors, a darning needle, a horseshoe, buckles, rifle and revolver shells and some brass hinges and screws. The items have since been gifted by Holmes to the State Library of Victoria.

== Retirement ==
Since retiring from full-time employment, Holmes worked as a consultant to both the World Bank and FAO as an expert adviser on land administration.

Preceded by John Eric Mitchell	Surveyor General of Victoria; 1979–1988	Succeeded by John Richard Parker
