= Alexander Black (surveyor) =

Scottish surveyor (1827–1897)

- Born: 25 May 1827; Arndilly, Banffshire, Scotland
- Died: 13 March 1897 (aged 69); St Kilda, Victoria, Australia
- Occupation: Surveyor
- Known for: Surveying the Victorian-New South Wales border

Alexander Black (25 May 1827 – 13 March 1897) was a Scottish-born surveyor who worked for most of career in Victoria, Australia and was Surveyor General of Victoria for six years from 1886.

Black was born at Arndilly, Banffshire, Scotland. After training as a land surveyor in Aberdeen and working locally, he migrated to Victoria in 1852. He worked in the Castlemaine goldfields then returned to Melbourne and joined the Victorian government survey office. His work included the survey of the Black-Allan Line—the eastern "straight-edge" portion of the border between the Australian states of New South Wales and Victoria.

Black was appointed Surveyor General of Victoria on 1 July 1886 and held the position until his retirement in May 1892. He was elected a member of the Victorian Institute of Surveyors (the Institution of Surveyors Victoria) in 1877 and was president 1878 to 1880. He died in St Kilda, Victoria on 13 March 1897.

Preceded by Alexander John Skene	Surveyor General of Victoria; 1886–1892	Succeeded by Michael Callanan
