= James McKerrow =

James McKerrow FRAS (7 July 1834 – 29 June 1919) was an astronomer, Surveyor-General of New Zealand, and Chief Commissioner of Railways in New Zealand.

McKerrow was the son of Andrew McKerrow and Margaret (née Steven) his wife, and was born at Kilmarnock, East Ayrshire, Scotland. McKerrow emigrated to Dunedin, New Zealand, in November 1859, and was District and Geodetical Surveyor of Otago from that year till 1873, Chief Surveyor of Otago from 1873 to 1877, Assistant Surveyor-General of New Zealand from January 1877 to October 1879, also Secretary of Crown Lands and Mines from February 1878 to January 1889. From October 1878 he held the latter office in conjunction with that of Surveyor-General of New Zealand, being appointed in January 1889 to the office of Chief Commissioner of New Zealand Railways.

From 1861 to 1863 McKerrow made the reconnaissance survey of the Otago Lake districts, an area of eight thousand square miles. The reports of these surveys were read before the Royal Geographical Society of London, and received the special commendation of the President, Sir Roderick Murchison, in his annual address. In 1874 and 1882 McKerrow was associated with the British expeditions for the observation of the Transit of Venus, 1882 in New Zealand. In 1884 he was elected a Fellow of the Royal Astronomical Society of London.

He was married on 5 August 1859, at Fenwick, Ayrshire, Scotland, to Miss Martha Dunlop.
