= Black–Allan Line =

Easternmost part of border between New South Wales and Victoria, Australia

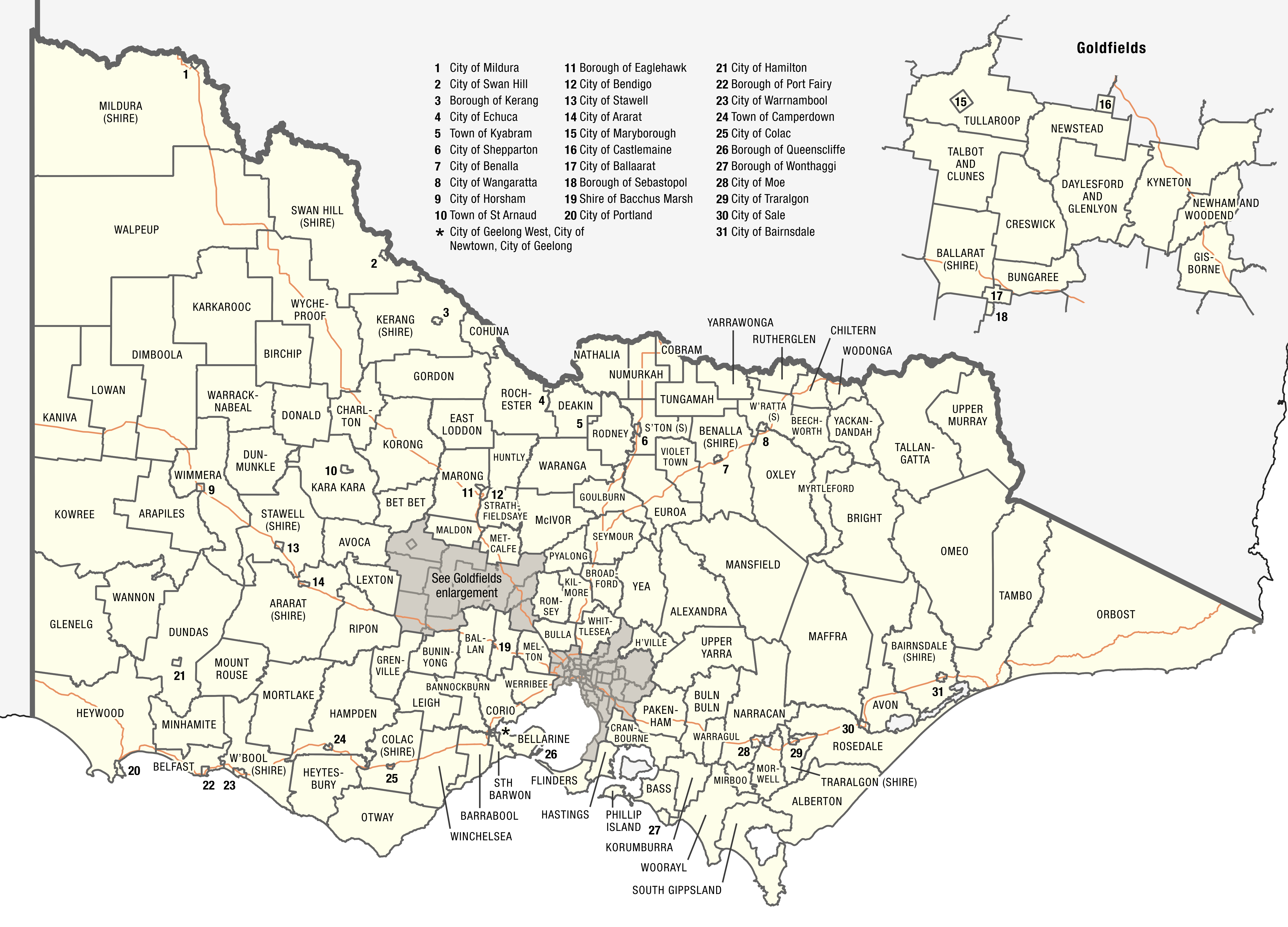
Map of the State of Victoria, showing 1993 Local Government Areas. The Black-Allan Line is the straight portion of the border extending NW from the eastern end.

The Black–Allan Line is the straight imaginary line that serves as the southeastern section of the border between the Australian states of New South Wales and Victoria. It is named for the surveyors Alexander Black and Alexander Charles Allan, who delineated the on-ground position of the line that stretches north-west from Cape Howe on the Tasman Sea coast to Indi Springs within the Australian Alps, which is the official headwaters of the Murray River. The Murray River, which flows north from Indi Springs, then forms the remainder of the state boundary until it reaches the South Australian borders.

Prior to 1835, the entire Eastern half of the Australian continent was under the administration of the Colony of New South Wales which was based in Sydney. From 1836, moves were made to establish a separate administration for the rapidly expanding settlements in the south-east of the continent, this being the Port Phillip District based in Melbourne. Various border arrangements between the two Administrations were proposed over the next few years, culminating in the Proclamation by Governor George Gipps in July 1842 that:

The boundary of the District of Port Phillip on the North and North-east shall be a straight line drawn from Cape Howe to the nearest source of the River Murray, and thence the course of that River to the Eastern boundary of the Province of South Australia.

Following the issuance of this proclamation, it was incumbent upon the two administrations to accurately define the border "on the ground" as quickly as possible to facilitate the orderly governance of the border districts and the management of their resources.

In the 1840s, attempts to determine the nearest source of the Murray to Cape Howe were made by the then Acting Surveyor-in-Charge of Port Phillip District, Thomas Scott Townsend under the direction of NSW Surveyor General, Major Sir Thomas Livingston Mitchell. Townsend produced a plan showing the straight line between the springs and Cape Howe. In 1866 the Victorian Parliament deemed Townsend's marking of Cape Howe insufficient.

In 1867 a suggestion made by the then Bairnsdale Police Magistrate and Warden of Gold Fields Alfred William Howitt together with District Surveyor J.G.W. Wilmot, led to the survey of the eastern border between Victoria and New South Wales. Howitt was concerned about which colony had civil and criminal jurisdiction over newly discovered gold fields on Snowy River tributaries near where the border was thought to be, in particular the Bendock, Bonang, Delegate, Goongerrah and Nicholson rivers. At the time, around 80% of Bairnsdale's population were involved in gold mining, and tensions between local and Chinese miners were rising, leading to crime becoming a significant problem. Similar issues affected several major mining operating in the region, including on Delegate River.

In response, Victorian and NSW governments agreed in 1869 to share the costs of marking the boundary.

The work to establish the on-ground position of the eastern section of the border between the two colonies was undertaken between 1870 and 1872. The total length of the boundary surveyed from Station No.1 Forest Hill to the pile of stones at Conference Point Cape Howe was recorded as 109.396 miles and the azimuth determined as W 25° 53' 58.00" N.

in 1869 Robert Ellery the Superintendent of Victorian Geodetic Survey and Government Astronomer (assisted by Surveyor William Turton) met with NSW Surveyor General Philip F. Adams (assisted by Surveyor Allan) at Cape Howe to decide the position of the eastern terminal of the border. The conference involved surveying the 20km of Cape Howe via making accurate geodetic observations. They agreed upon a certain point of rocks, as a suitable termination point for the border, which they named Conference Point. They also agreed to accept the border survey's adopted bearing line, if the measured line ended within 500 links (100.58m) of the point of rocks.

Towards the end of 1869, Alexander Black had investigated and surveyed the several springs that he considered to be the closest source of the Murray River to Cape Howe. His survey accurately determined the nearest source of the Murray River to Cape Howe using geodetic survey methods making observations from hilltop to hilltop. Black buried a large stone marked "A B 1870" 2 feet (61cm) below the ground on the computed border line, at the instrument station on the ridge closest to the adopted springs. Black named this observing position station No.1 on summit of "Great Dividing Range" at Forest Hill. Black placed No.1 instrument station 2250 links (452.63m) from the adopted springs. Black also constructed a 12 foot (3.66m) high stone cairn above the marker stone.

With the positions of each end determined, the bearing of the straight line border was computed, and each surveyor was deployed to mark the line.

In November 1869 Alexander Allan commenced his survey near Delegate River and marked the line to Cape Howe (approx.70 miles), traversing over Hensleighs Range, Mounts Tennyson, Buckle and Carlyle, and crossing the Genoa River. Allan's traverse at Conference Point terminated within a few inches of the mark made from Ellery and Adams.

Alexander Allan prepared a series of plans showing the results of his work to measure and mark the border between Delegate River and Cape Howe (Conference Point).

Plan of Black-Allan Line between Delegate and Queensboro' Rivers prepared by A.C.Allan 21/01/1871	Plan of Black-Allan Line between watershed of Genoa and Cann Rivers and Queenbor'o Run	Plan of Black Allan Line between the watershed of the Cann and Genoa Rivers and Mount Buckle.	Plan of A.C. Allan's survey of the Black-Allan Line from Mount Buckle to Cape Howe

Alexander Black prepared a plan BL 01 showing the results of his work to measure and mark the border between the Delegate River and Cape Howe (Conference Point).

Plan of Black-Allan Line between Forest Hill and Delegate River by Alexander Black dated 1870	Sketches and descriptions of Cairns Nos.1 to 9 placed on the Black-Allan Line between Forest Hill and Delegate River
Photo of Cairn No.1 re-piled by survey in November 2004.	Photo of original border marker stone found buried at Forest Hill Station by Alexander Black in 1870, under Cairn No.1.

The surveyors built regular stone cairns to demarcate their survey line, most of which survive to the present.

The survey was also remarkably accurate for the time, only missing its precise end target by around 43 centimetres (17 in). Victorian Government astronomer Robert Ellery was reportedly quoted as having described Black and Allan's work as;

a piece of survey work which, for difficulties and for the requirement of skills, energy and endurance, as well for accuracy attained, I believe has never been surpassed [...].

The boundary of the Port Philip District of New South Wales was defined in the New South Wales Constitution Act, 1842 (UK) as

the boundary of the district of Port Phillip on the north and north east shall be a straight line drawn from Cape How [sic] to the nearest source of the river Murray and thence the course of that river to the eastern boundary of the province of South Australia.

The Australian Constitutions Act, 1850 (UK) which established the colony of Victoria, uses the same definition.

Due to ongoing oversights between the states, however, the actual border was not officially (and legally) ratified until 2006.
