= John Marchant (surveyor) =

New Zealand surveyor and cricketer

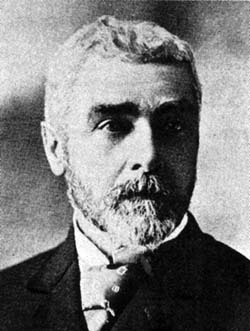

Personal information
- Full name: John William Allman Marchant
- Born: 9 October 1841; Belgaum, Mysore, India
- Died: 22 December 1920 (aged 79); Wellington, New Zealand

Domestic team information
- Years: Team
- 1873-74 to 1881-82: Wellington

Career statistics
Competition	First-class
Matches	3
Runs scored	44
Batting average	8.80
100s/50s	0/0
Top score	20
Balls bowled	220
Wickets	9
Bowling average	8.66
5 wickets in innings	1
10 wickets in match	0
Best bowling	5/26
Catches/stumpings	9/–
- Source: CricketArchive, 25 July 2020

John William Allman Marchant (9 October 1841 – 22 December 1920) was a New Zealand Surveyor-General and first-class cricketer.

== Early life and surveying career ==
John Marchant was born in Belgaum, India, where his father, Dr Allman, was a surgeon with the 4th King’s Own Regiment. He was educated at Queenwood College in Hampshire, and after the death of his father he adopted his stepfather's name. He assisted his stepfather on railway construction in Brazil, before joining the colonial survey staff in Victoria, Australia, where he obtained his surveying qualifications in 1862.

Marchant moved to Invercargill in New Zealand in 1863 and practised as a surveyor. In 1865 he joined the Lands and Survey Department and surveyed the boundaries of the Nelson district goldfields. In 1875 he became deputy inspector of surveys under the native land acts, and in 1876 New Zealand’s first geodesical surveyor. In 1879 he was appointed chief surveyor of Wellington district, in 1884 commissioner of crown lands, and in 1902 Surveyor-General of New Zealand. He retired in 1906. He also served on the Scenery Preservation Commission until his retirement.

In 1882 he and a colleague observed the transit of Venus from a station they set up in the Wairarapa. Their observations formed part of the worldwide gathering of information on the event.

== Cricket career ==
While living in Invercargill, Marchant is believed to have scored the first century in any form of cricket in New Zealand, when he made 117 in 1864 in a Town versus Country match in Invercargill. An all-rounder, noted for the brilliance of his slip fielding, he captained Wellington in two first-class matches at the Basin Reserve in Wellington in 1873-74. In the first, he took six wickets and two catches in a narrow loss to Auckland. In the second he took three catches in each innings, two wickets with his bowling, and made a useful 20 in the second innings of a low-scoring tied match against Nelson. Between these two first-class matches, he played for Wellington in a one-day, two-innings match against Hawke's Bay in January 1874; in Hawke's Bay's second innings he took 9 for 21 and also took three catches, two off his own bowling and one in the slips.

Marchant was one of the leading figures in the conversion of the Basin Reserve from swampy land into a cricket ground. He contributed all the necessary surveying work and oversaw the addition and placement of soil, all at no cost.

== Personal life ==
Marchant married Maria Elise Wright in St Peter's Church, Te Aro, Wellington, on 10 June 1868. They had five sons and six daughters, one of whom was Maria Elise Allman Marchant, a noted school principal. He died at the Bowen Street hospital in Wellington on 22 December 1920.
