= Martin Sullivan (priest) =

New Zealand Anglican dean (1910–1980)

Martin Gloster Sullivan KCVO (30 March 1910 – 5 September 1980) was an Anglican dean from New Zealand.

He was born in Auckland and was educated at Auckland Grammar School and the University of Auckland. He was ordained in 1934 and began his career with a curacy at St Matthew's, Auckland. After that he held incumbencies at Grey Lynn and Te Awamutu. During the Second World War he was a Chaplain to the Forces, serving as Battalion Padre of the 22nd Battalion (New Zealand) and when peace returned Principal of College House, Christchurch. In 1950 he was appointed Dean of Christchurch and vicar-general (1951–1961). In 1953, Sullivan was awarded the Queen Elizabeth II Coronation Medal.

Moving to London, Sullivan was appointed Rector of St Mary's, Bryanston Square in 1962, then Archdeacon of London the following year. In 1967 he became Dean of St Paul's, a post he held for a decade. An eminent author; amongst others he wrote Children Listen (1955), On Calvary’s Tree (1957), Approach With Joy (1961), A Dean Speaks to New Zealand (1962) and A Funny Thing Happened to me on the way to St Paul’s (1968). In 1965, he was made a Freeman of the City of London. In the 1979 Queen's Birthday Honours, Sullivan was appointed a Knight Commander of the Order of St Michael and St George.

He had married Doris Rosie Grant Cowen in 1934 (daughter of Canon Grant Cowen, she died 1972) and remarried Elizabeth Roberton in St Paul's Cathedral in 1973. Roberton had been headmistress of several schools including Diocesan School for Girls, Auckland and Taranaki Diocesan School for Girls. Sullivan had no children.

He wrote "Notes of an Army Chaplain" for The Spectator magazine.

Sullivan died in 1980 at a function held by the Auckland University Rugby Club where he was a key guest speaker.
