= Alexander John Skene =

Australian surveyor (1820–1894)

Alexander John Skene, Esq. M.A. J.P. (1820 – 22 August 1894) was Surveyor General of Victoria, (then a colony, now a state of Australia) from 1869 to 1886.

== Early life ==
Skene was born Aberdeen, Scotland, the son of Alexander John Skene, an army major, and his wife Catherine Margaret, née Auldjowas. Skene junior was educated at the University of Aberdeen graduating M.A. in 1838 and practised in surveying.

== Career in Australia ==
Skene arrived in Melbourne in 1839, became official surveyor to the Grant district council in 1843 and a government district surveyor in October 1848. Skene showed the theodolite to be a more accurate and reliable than the compass technique previously used. In 1853 Skene was placed in charge of the District Survey Office at Geelong and in 1854 was appointed Surveyor of the colony under patent. Three years afterwards Mr. Skene was specially employed to report on the nature and capability of the land of the colony, and in 1862 was transferred to Melbourne. On 12 June 1863 Charles Gavan Duffy appointed Skene District Surveyor for the united Melbourne and Geelong districts. He was appointed Acting Surveyor-General on 15 September 1868, during the absence on leave of Charles Whybrow Ligar. The Governor of Victoria, with the advice of the Executive Council of Victoria, appointed Skene as Surveyor-General of Victoria on 15 September 1869, to replace Charles Whybrow Ligar who retired. Skene was a key figure in producing an accurate map of Victoria on a scale of eight miles to the inch (about 5 km per cm) in 1876.

Skene was a founding member of the Victorian Institute of Surveyors established in 1874, and was nominated as the inaugural President of the Institute on 7 April 1874, but declined. At its first meeting held at Weber's Hotel, Elizabeth Street Melbourne at 12.30pm on Saturday 9 May 1874, the Institute acknowledged with regret Skene's inability to accept the office of President, but was hopeful that as a member, Skene would take as active an interest as possible in the affairs of the Institute.

== Late life ==
Skene retired as Surveyor General in 1886, and was succeeded by Alexander Black. Made a commissioner of land tax in 1878, Skene was reappointed in 1887. He died in the Melbourne suburb of St Kilda on 22 August 1894, survived by three of his four sons and one of his two daughters. Skene, who married Catherine Williamson at Heidelberg, Victoria, on 31 August 1842, was appointed a justice of the peace (J.P.) in 1865.

| Preceded by Charles Whybrow Ligar | Surveyor General of Victoria; 1869–1886 | Succeeded by Alexander Black |
