= Charles Ligar =

Military and civil surveyor (1811–1881)

Charles Whybrow Ligar
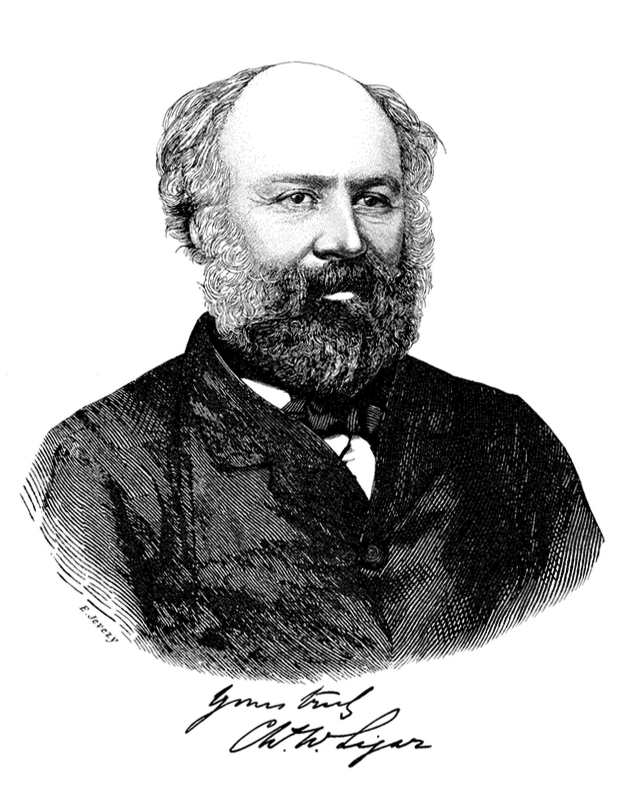
- Charles Whybrow Ligar, 1860s Artist: Émile Jevezy
- Born: 24 July 1811; British Ceylon
- Died: 17 January 1881 (aged 69); San Antonio, Texas, US
- Occupation: Surveyor
- Office: Senior Civil Assistant, Ordnance Survey of Ireland, –1840; Surveyor General of New Zealand, 1842–56; Lieutenant Colonel, Auckland Battalion of Militia, 1845; Justice of the Peace for the Province of Auckland, 1856; Justice of the Peace for the Colony of New Zealand, 1857; Surveyor General of Victoria, 1858–69

Charles Whybrow Ligar (1811–1881) was an Ordnance Survey surveyor, Surveyor General of New Zealand and Surveyor General of Victoria (then a colony, now a state of Australia).

== Early life ==
Charles Ligar was born on 24 July 1811 in Ceylon, now Sri Lanka, where his father was stationed. From the age of 13 years he was educated at the Royal Military College (1825–1828).

== Career ==
Reputedly commissioned in the Corps of Royal Engineers, Ligar is said to have resigned shortly afterwards to join Ordnance Survey. He was employed as a civil assistant on the Ordnance Survey of Ireland until 1840. In 1839 he married Grace Hanyngton, daughter of Thomas Hanyngton of Dungannon, County Tyrone, and grand niece of the Earl of Charlemont.

In London, on 16 February 1841, the Queen was pleased to appoint Ligar to be Surveyor General of the Colony of New Zealand. Together with the survey staff Lord John Russell had commissioned Captain Robert Kearsley Dawson, RE, to select, Ligar and family departed Gravesend on 16 April and Plymouth on 14 May 1841, on the Prince Rupert, for New Zealand.

=== New Zealand ===
After being shipwrecked at the Cape of Good Hope on 4 September, the Ligars and survey staff finally arrived at Wellington, on board the Antilla, on 8 December.

A meeting had been held as early as mid-July 1841 to establish the Auckland Mechanics' Institute. On 5 September 1842 the Institute elected Ligar as vice-president. His former superior in Ireland, now Commanding Royal Engineer, New Zealand, Lieutenant George Augustus Bennett, RE, was elected president, and acting governor Willoughby Shortland, RN, took on the role of patron on 22 September.

Ligar was also appointed land titles commissioner in the late 1840s. He purchased a vast quantity of land from Māori for the European settlers.

Following the Battle of Kororareka on 11 March 1845 and the passing of the Militia Bill in Auckland on 25 March, Ligar was appointed Lieutenant-Colonel in the Auckland Battalion of Militia, second in command to the governor, Robert FitzRoy, as colonel. Construction of an ambitious fieldwork for two militia companies, called Fort Ligar, commenced on private land on the town's western high ground as part of Auckland's immediate defence. However, the arrival of 200 men of the 58th Regiment, and FitzRoy's proclamation of 26 April commencing military operations in the north, brought an end to it only weeks after work began. During the war Ligar was engaged in producing a military map of the field in the Bay of Islands.

Ligar resigned as surveyor general in 1856, and went to Otago, unsuccessfully seeking to become the provincial surveyor. He discovered gold in the Mataura River while searching for grazing land.

=== Australia ===
Ligar was appointed Surveyor General of Victoria in 1858 (replacing Clement Hodgkinson), promising to reduce survey costs and open the land for settlers. Ligar initially proposed to replace all government surveyors with contractors, a move that was not popular. At this time though, one great saving was achieved through the development and implementation of photolithographic duplication of plans, a process developed "in-house" by John Walter Osborne. By 1869, leading politicians were demanding his removal and Ligar resigned in September. His replacement as Surveyor General was Alexander John Skene. In 1869 Ligar married Marie, daughter of the late Captain Williams, of Auckland, New Zealand.

== Late life ==
Ligar retired initially to Europe, lived for some time in Germany, Morocco, Algeria and Spain, then took up ranching in Texas, US. He died there in February 1881 and was buried at Willow Springs, Parker County, Texas.

Preceded by Felton Mathew	Surveyor-General of New Zealand; 1842–1856	Succeeded by Position ceded to Provinces until 1879 (John Turnbull Thomson from 1879)
Preceded by Clement Hodgkinson	Surveyor General of Victoria; 1858–1869	Succeeded by Alexander John Skene
