= Surveyor-General of New Zealand =

Surveyor-General of New Zealand is a position created in 1840 when New Zealand became a separate colony.

== List of office holders ==
Surveyor general	Period in office	Notes
Felton Mathew	February 1840 – December 1841	Appointed 1839
Charles Whybrow Ligar	January 1842 – February 1856	From 1852 to 1876 the office of Surveyor-General lapsed. Control of surveys was ceded to the provinces.
John Turnbull Thomson	May 1876 – October 1879	Surveyor-General was appointed in 1876 as head of the Department of the Surveyor-General.
James McKerrow	November 1879 – January 1889	Secretary for Crown Lands and Surveyor-General
Stephenson Percy Smith	February 1889 – June 1901	Secretary for Crown Lands and Surveyor-General
Alexander Barron	July 1901 – December 1901	Secretary for Crown Lands and Acting Surveyor-General
John William Allman Marchant	January 1902 – June 1906	Secretary for Crown Lands and Surveyor-General
Thomas Humphries	July 1906 – June 1909	
John Strauchon	July 1909 – Mar 1912	
James Mackenzie	April 1912 – Mar 1914	
Ernest Herbert Wilmot	April 1914 – Mar 1920	
Thomas Noel Brodrick	April 1920 – October 1920	Under-Secretary for Lands and Surveyor-General
William Thomas Neill	October 1920 – December 1928	
Maurice Crompton Smith	October 1922 – December 1922	Acting
John Baird Thompson	January 1929 – Mar 1929	
Harry Edward Walshe	April 1929 – Mar 1946	
Russell Gladstone Dick	April 1946 – June 1962	
Robert Philip Gough	June 1962 – June 1970	
William Seaton Boyes	July 1970 – February 1973	
Ian Francis Stirling	Mar 1973 – June 1981	
Warren Neil Hawkey	July 1981 – September 1987	
William Alexander Robertson	October 1987 – June 1996	also Director-General from April 1988
Anthony John Bevin	June 1996 – April 2004	Acting from October 1995 to June 1996
Dr Donald Grant	April 2004 – February 2014	
Mark Dyer	Mar 2014 – August 2018	
Anselm Haanen	August 2018 – present	Acting from August 2018 to July 2019
