= International Federation of Surveyors =

Global organization for the profession of surveying and related disciplines

- Formation: 1878; 148 years ago
- Type: INGO
- Purpose: to support international collaboration for the progress of surveying in all fields and applications
- Headquarters: Copenhagen, Denmark
- Region served: 120 countries represented
- Members: 105 national member associations
- Official languages: English, French, German
- President: Rudolf Staiger Germany
- Main organ: Council
- Website: www.fig.net

International Federation of Surveyors (abbreviated FIG, after the French: Fédération Internationale des Géomètres) is the UN-recognized global organization for the profession of surveying and related disciplines. It was established in 1878, and formed as a legal entity in 1999. As of August 2012, FIG has 106 member associations from 88 countries.

== Membership ==
FIG has five categories of membership and two levels of honorary membership. 120 countries are represented in FIG through these various categories of membership:

- Member associations: National associations representing one or more of the disciplines of surveying
- Affiliates: Groups of surveyors or surveying organizations undertaking professional activities but not fulfilling the criteria for member associations
- Corporate Members: Organisations, institutions or agencies which provide commercial services related to the profession of surveyor
- Academic members: Organisations, institutions or agencies which promote education or research in one or more of the disciplines of surveying
- Correspondents: individuals in countries where there is no association or group of surveyors eligible for membership

FIG also has categories of honorary membership for past presidents and individuals who have materially assisted the development and promotion of the surveying profession at the international level.

== Permanent institutions ==
FIG has set up the following permanent institutions:

- The International Office of Cadastre and Land Records (Office International du Cadastre et du Régime Foncier – OICRF)
- International Institution for the History of Surveying and Measurement. This was formally established in 1998, continuing the work of an ad hoc commission set up by FIG in about 1980.

== Partner Organisations ==
The FIG is a scientific associate member of the International Council for Science (ICSU).

== See also ==
- American Congress on Surveying and Mapping
- Canadian Institute of Geomatics
