= Agriculture in Australia =

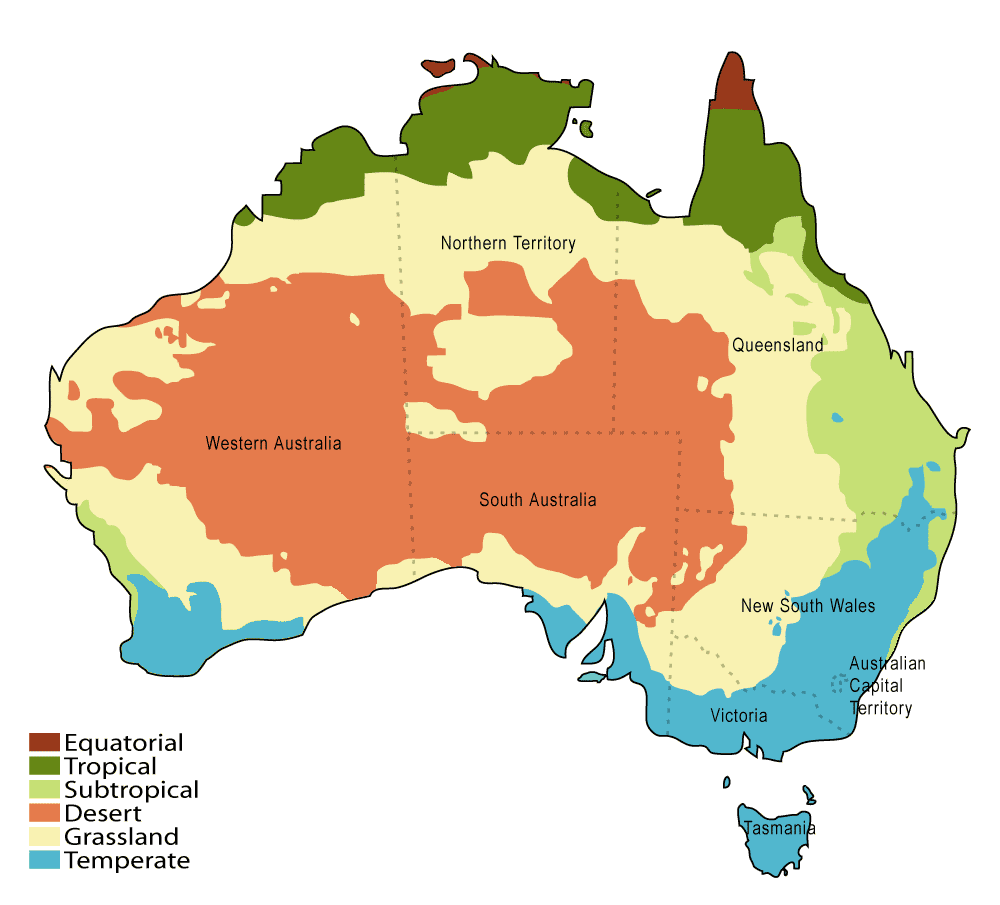
Climate map of Australia, based on Köppen classification

Adults employed in the agriculture, forestry and fishing industries as a percentage of the adult population in Australia based upon the 2011 census, divided geographically by statistical local area

Although Australia is mostly arid, the nation is a major agricultural producer and exporter, with around 292,200 people employed in agriculture, forestry and fishing as of February 2026. Agriculture's farm gate output was $100 billion per year for a 5.7% share of GDP in 2023. Farmers and grazers own 135,997 farms, covering 61% of Australia's landmass. Across the country, there is a mix of irrigation and dry-land farming. The success of Australian agriculture has been facilitated by long-term policy settings and promotion of reforms that greatly increase investment and, by extension, overall farming output.

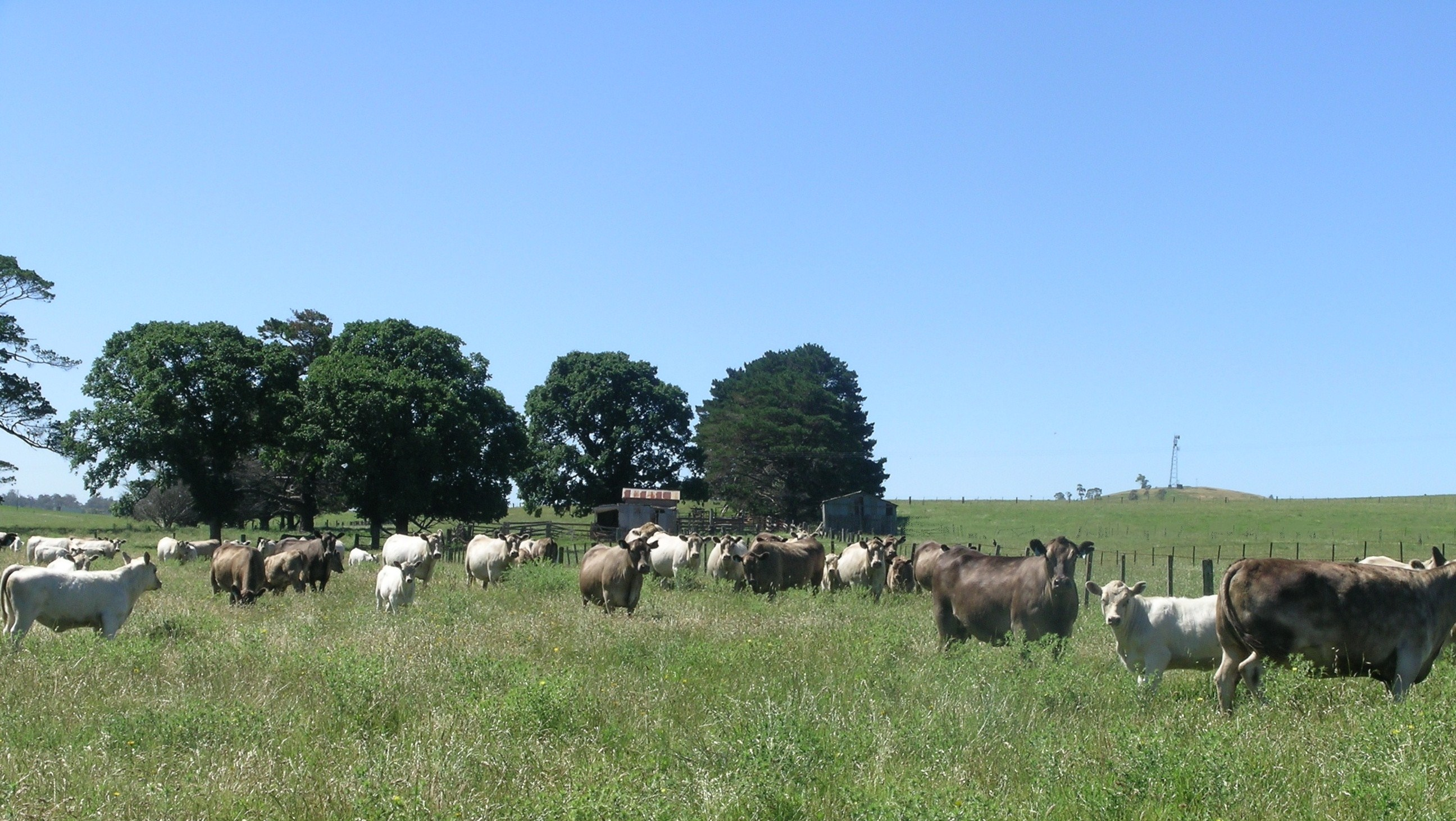
Murray Grey beef cows and calves

There are three main zones: the high rainfall zone of Tasmania and a narrow coastal zone (used principally for dairying and beef production); wheat, sheep zone (cropping (principally winter crops), and the grazing of sheep (for wool, lamb and mutton) plus beef cattle) and the pastoral zone (characterised by low rainfall, less fertile soils, and large scale pastoral activities involving the grazing of beef cattle and sheep for wool and mutton). An indicator of the viability of agriculture in the state of South Australia is whether the land is within Goyder's Line.

== History ==
Aboriginal Australians have been variously described as hunter-gatherer-cultivators and proto-farmers, as there is evidence that farming activities were undertaken prior to the arrival of Europeans, including tilling, planting and irrigating. However, these practices were non-industrialised and complementary to hunting, gathering and fishing. Whether the people could be termed agriculturalists is controversial. In 1788, the first European settlers brought agricultural technology from their homelands which radically changed the dominant practices. After some initial failures, wool dominated in the 19th century and, in the first half of the 20th century, dairying increased in its popularity, driven by technological changes like canning and refrigeration.

Meat exports were very significant in the development of Australian agriculture. By 1925, there were 54 export freezing works, capable of killing 6000 cattle and 90,000 sheep and lambs daily. Initially, the meat for British markets had to be frozen, but later beef could be exported chilled.

=== 2000-2019 ===
Development of agricultural output of Australia in 2015 US$ since 1961

At the turn of the millennium, Australia produced a large variety of primary products for export and domestic consumption. Australia's production in the first five years was as follows:

Commodity (in millions of AUD$)	2001–02	2002–03	2003–04	2004–05	2005–06
Cattle and calves	6,617	5,849	6,345	7,331	7,082
Wheat	6,356	2,692	5,636	4,320	5,905
Milk	3,717	2,795	2,828	3,808	3,268
Fruit and nuts	2,333	2,408	2,350	2,640	2,795
Vegetables	2,269	2,126	2,356	2,490	2,601
Wool	2,713	3,318	2,397	2,196	2,187
Barley	1,725	984	1,750	1,240	1,744
Poultry	1,175	1,273	1,264	1,358	1,416
Lamb	1,181	1,161	1,318	1,327	1,425
Sugar cane	989	1,019	854	968	1,037

Australia's main crops were contrasting in preferred climate: sugar cane (typical of tropical countries), wheat and barley (typical of cold countries).

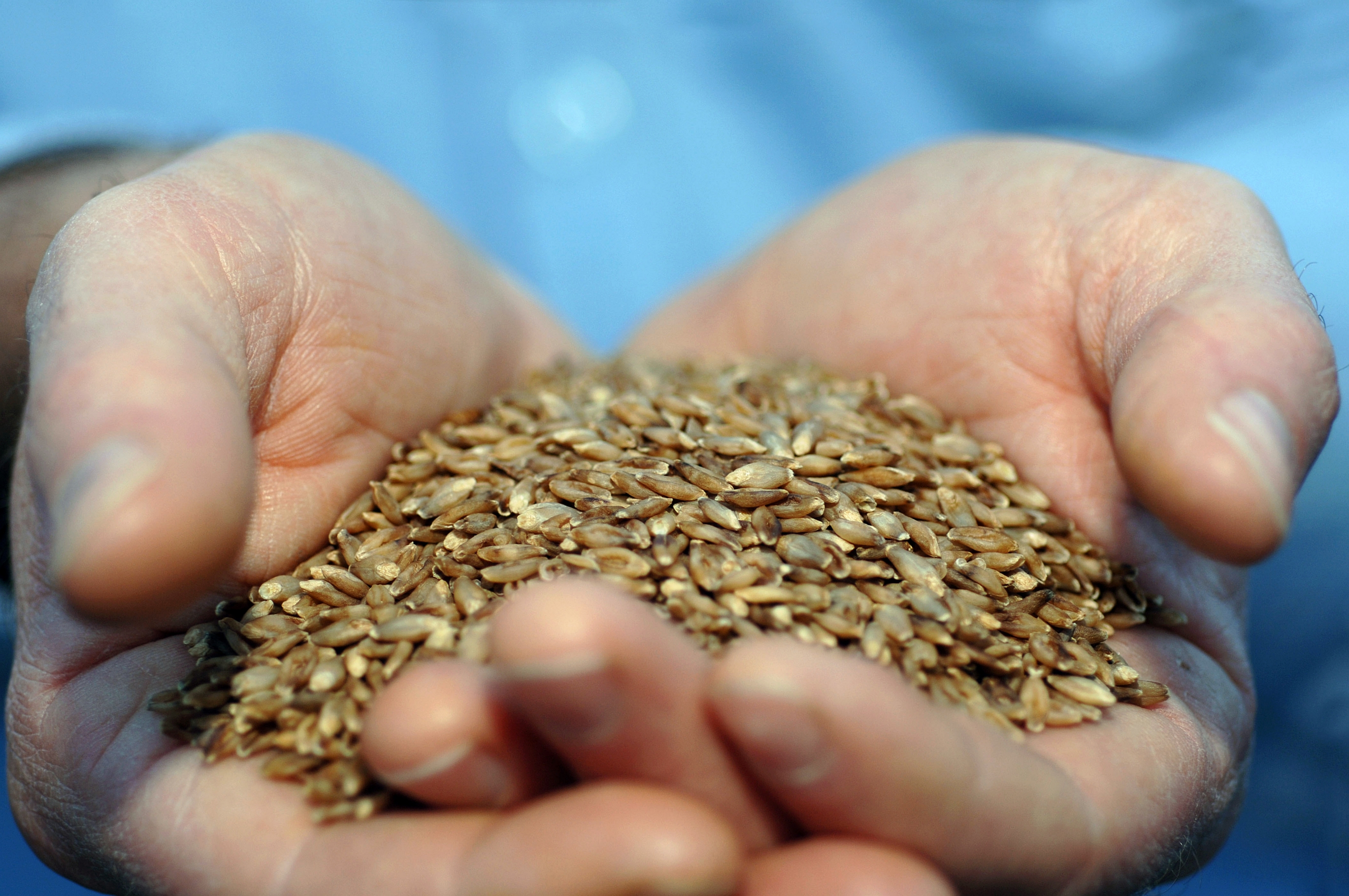
CSIRO scientists have developed new strains of barley.

In 2018, Australia was the world's largest producer of lupin bean (714 thousand tons), the world's second largest producer of chickpeas (1 million tons), the world's fourth largest producer of barley (9.2 million tons) and oats (1.2 million tons), the 5th largest producer of rapeseed (3.9 million tons), the 9th largest producer of sugarcane (33.5 million tons) and wheat (20.9 million tons) and the 13th largest producer of grape (1.66 million tons). In the same year, the country also produced 1.2 million tons of sorghum, 1.1 million tons of potato, in addition to smaller productions of other agricultural products, such as rice (635 thousand tons), maize (387 thousand tons), tomato (386 thousand tons), orange (378 thousand tons), fava beans (377 thousand tons), banana (373 thousand tons), pea (317 thousand tons), carrot (284 thousand tons), onion (278 thousand tons), apple (268 thousand tons), lentils (255 thousand tons), melon (224 thousand tons), watermelon (181 thousand tons), tangerine (138 thousand tons) etc.

=== 2019 ===
Late in 2019, the COVID-19 pandemic began, and Australian agriculture was heavily impacted by the resulting supply chain issues. The scarcity of freight space and disruption to Chinese New Year purchases was particularly painful, with China being Australia's largest export market and a particularly large buyer of live seafood.

==== China Tariffs ====
In May, the Australian government proposed an independent investigation of the origin of COVID-19. Shortly afterwards, China placed large restrictions on their imports of a number of Australian agricultural products, as well as coal. Agriculture is one of Australia's most trade-exposed economic sectors.

==== Labour shortages ====
The agricultural workforce was heavily reliant on international workers, and by the end of 2020, the pandemic resulted in a severe shortage of farm workers across the country. Much produce could not be picked, with losses estimated at $22 million, thanks to a backpacker workforce diminished from 200,000 to 52,000. The shortage lingered through 2021, with skilled labour also in short supply, leading to calls to double Australia's skilled migrant uptake.

== Products ==
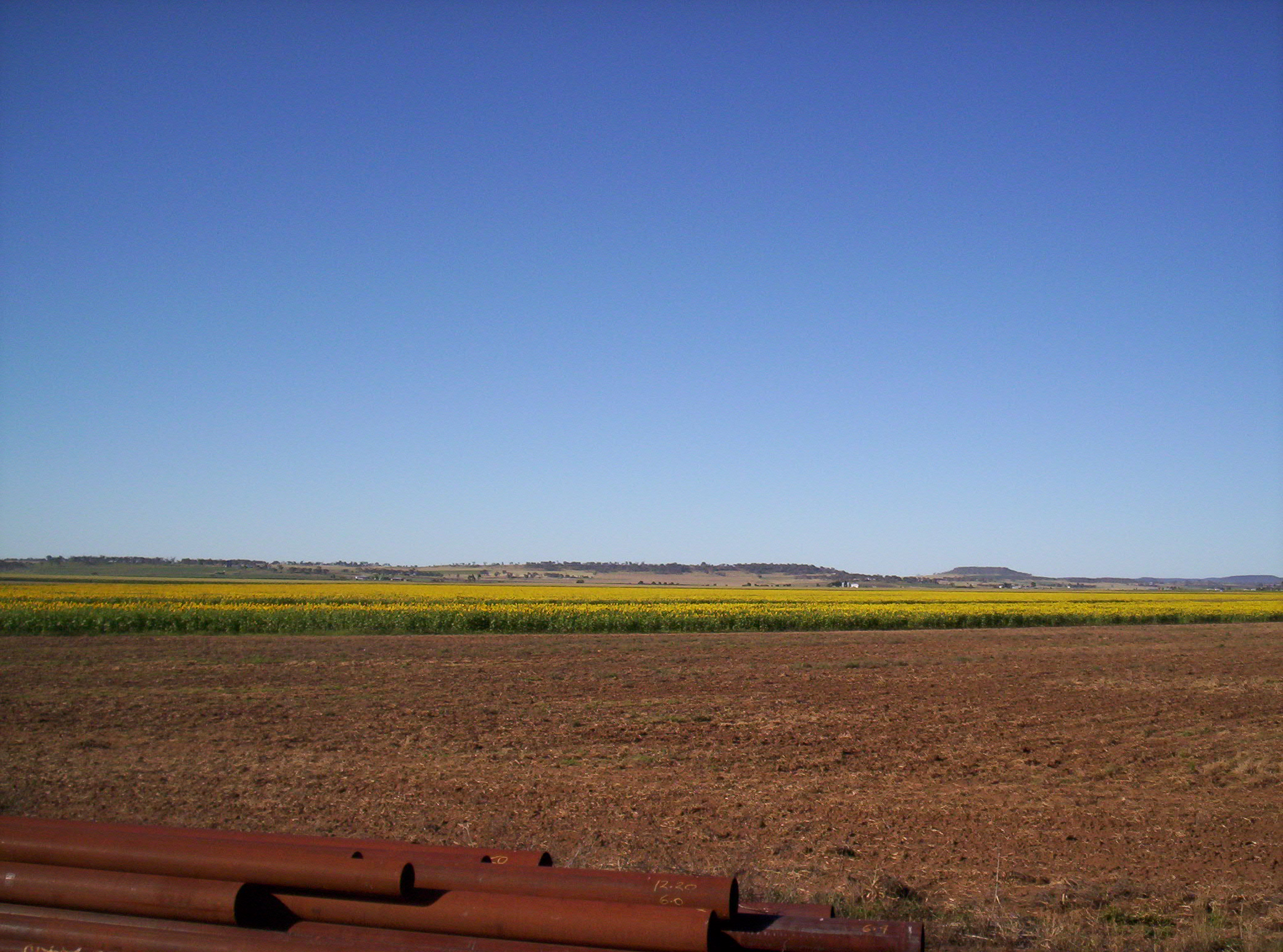
Sunflower crop on the Darling Downs, Queensland

Australian cereals quarterly exports ($Millions) since 1969

=== Crops ===
Cereals, oilseeds and grain legumes are produced on a large scale in Australia for human consumption and livestock feed. Wheat is the cereal with the greatest production in terms of area and value to the Australian economy. Sugarcane, grown in tropical Australia, is also an important crop; however, the unsubsidised industry (while lower-cost than heavily subsidised European and American sugar producers) is struggling to compete with the huge and much more efficient Brazilian sugarcane industry.

==== Horticulture ====
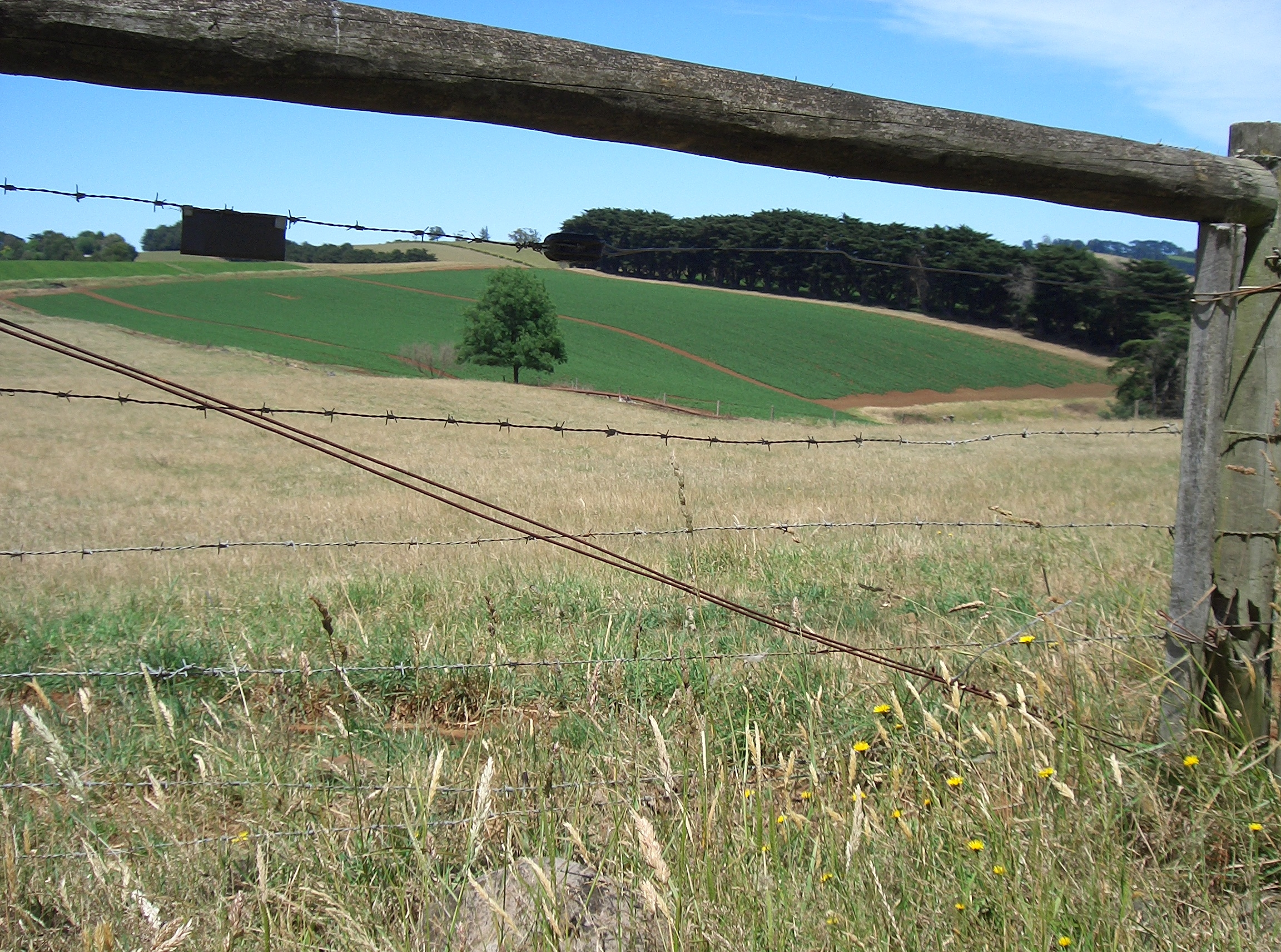
Potato farming in rural Victoria

In 2005, McDonald's Australia Ltd announced it would no longer source all its potatoes for fries from Tasmanian producers and announced a new deal with New Zealand suppliers. Subsequently, Vegetable and Potato Growers Australia (Ltd.) launched a political campaign advocating protectionism.

==== Olives ====
Olives have been grown in Australia since the early 1800s. Olive trees were planted by the warden of the self-funded penal settlement on St Helena Island, Queensland in Moreton Bay. By the mid-90s, there were 2,000 hectares (4,900 acres) of olives, and from 2000 to 2003 passed 20,000 hectares (49,000 acres). By 2014 (Ravetti and Edwards, 2014) there were 2000 plantations, covering over 35,000 hectares (86,000 acres), and producing 93,500 tonnes (92,000 long tons; 103,100 short tons) of olives. 3,000 tonnes (3,000 long tons; 3,300 short tons) were used as table olives and around 5–7,000 tonnes (4.9–6,889.4 long tons; 5.5–7,716.2 short tons) exported to the United States, China, the European Union, New Zealand and Japan. Between 2009 and 2014, Australia imported an average of 31,000 tonnes (31,000 long tons; 34,000 short tons) predominantly from Spain, Italy and Greece. China's olive oil consumption is increasing, and Chinese investors have begun to buy Australian olive farms. Olive cultivars include Arbequina, Arecuzzo, Barnea, Barouni, Coratina, Correggiola, Del Morocco, Frantoio, Hojiblanca, Jumbo Kalamata, Kalamata, Koroneiki, Leccino, Manzanillo, Pendulino, Picholine, Picual, Sevillano, UC13A6, and Verdale. Manzanillo, Azapa, Nab Tamri and South Australian Verdale produce table olives.

==== Viticulture ====
Although the Australian wine industry enjoyed a large period of growth during the 1990s, overplanting and oversupply led to a large drop in the value of wine, forcing out of business some winemakers, especially those on contracts to large wine-producing companies. At the time, the future for some Australian wine producers seemed uncertain, but by 2015 a national study showed that the industry had recovered and the combined output of grape growing and winemaking were major contributors to the Australian economy's gross output while the associated industry of wine tourism had also expanded. A follow-up report from 2019 demonstrated further consolidation, by which stage wine had become Australia's fifth-largest agricultural export industry, with domestic and international sales contributing AU$45.5 billion to gross output.

Wine producers were impacted by the 2019–20 Australian bushfire season, with Adelaide Hills losing 30% of its vineyards. Grapes around the country were affected by smoke, with the smell affecting the wine produced.

=== Livestock ===
Australian meat quarterly exports ($Millions) since 1969

==== Beef industry ====
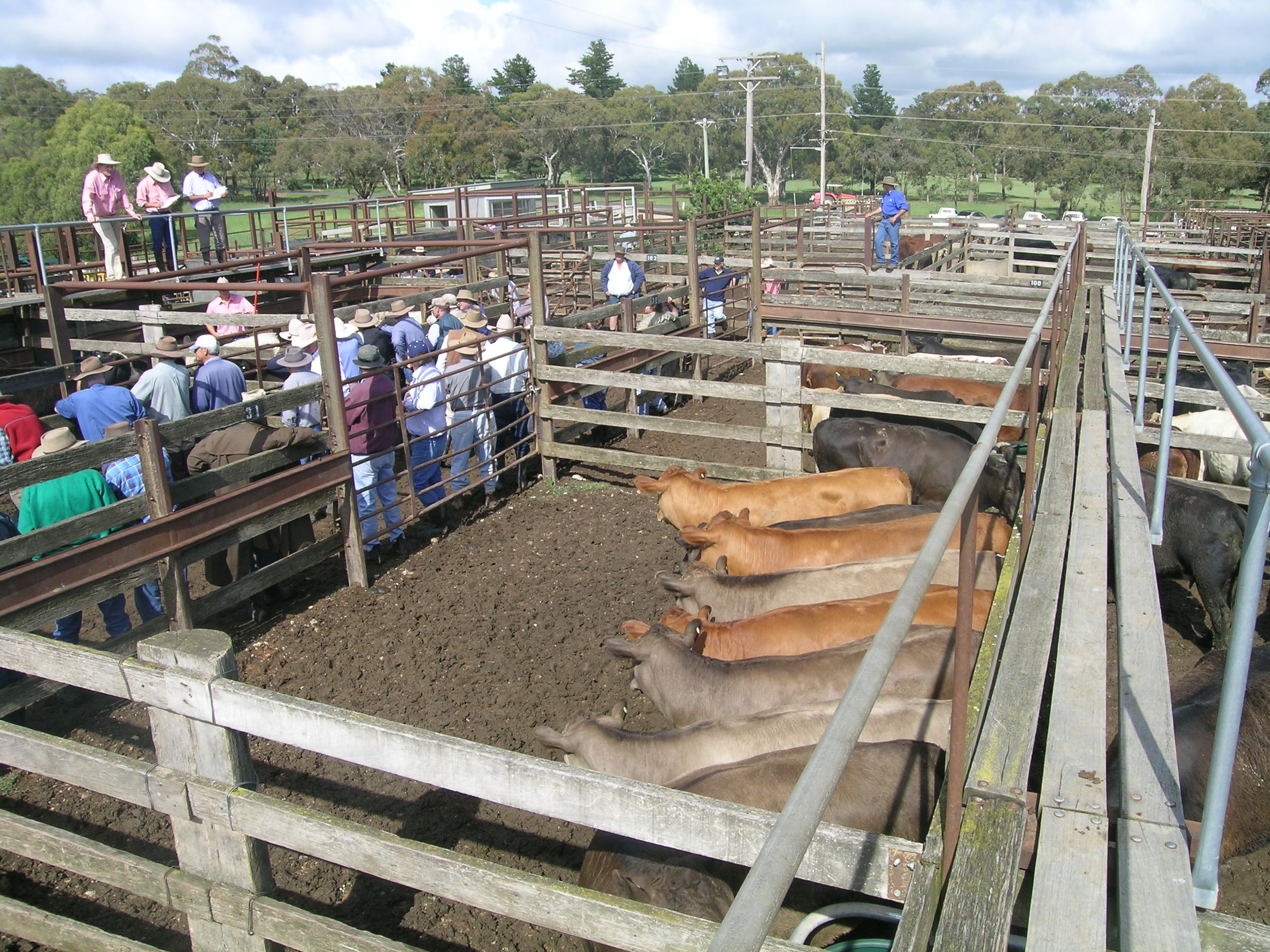
Grass-fed cattle offered for sale at an auction

The beef industry is the largest agricultural enterprise in Australia, and it is the second largest beef exporter, behind Brazil, in the world. All states and territories of Australia support cattle breeding in a wide range of climates. Cattle production is a major industry that covers an area in excess of 200 million hectares. The Australian beef industry is dependent on export markets, with over 60% of Australian beef production exported, primarily to the United States, Korea and Japan.

In southern Australia (NSW, Victoria, Tasmania, South Australia and south-western Western Australia) beef cattle are often reared on smaller properties as part of a mixed farming or grazing operation, but some properties do specialise in producing cattle. The southern calves are typically reared on pasture and sold as weaners, yearlings or steers at about two years old or older. Artificial insemination and embryo transfer are more commonly used in stud cattle breeding in Australia, but may be used in other herds.

In the Top End, sub-tropical areas and in arid inland regions, cattle are bred on native pastures on expansive cattle stations. Anna Creek Station in South Australia is the world's largest working cattle station. The North Australian Pastoral Company Pty Limited (NAPCO) is now one of Australia's largest beef cattle producers, with a herd of over 180,000 cattle and fourteen cattle stations in Queensland and the Northern Territory. The Australian Agricultural Company (AA Co) manages a cattle herd of more than 585,000 herd. Heytesbury Beef Pty Ltd owns and manages over 200,000 herd of cattle across eight stations spanning the East Kimberley, Victoria River and Barkly Tablelands regions in Northern Australia.

Prior to European settlement, there were no cattle in Australia. The present herd consists principally of British and European breeds (Bos taurus) in the southern regions, with Aberdeen Angus and Herefords being the most common. In northern Australia, Bos indicus breeds predominate along with their crosses. They were introduced to combine the resistance to cattle ticks and greater tolerance to hot weather.

In 1981, the industry was shaken by the Australian meat substitution scandal, which revealed that horse and kangaroo meat had been both exported overseas and sold domestically as beef.

==== Dairy ====
Domestic milk markets were heavily regulated until the 1980s, particularly for milk used for domestic fresh milk sales. This protected smaller producers in the northern states who produced exclusively for their local markets. The Kerin Plan (named after politician John Kerin) began the process of deregulation in 1986. The final price supports were removed in 2000 with the assistance of Pat Rowley, head of the Australian Dairy Farmers Federation and the Australian Dairy Industry Council. Deregulation ultimately saw 13,000 Australian dairy farmers produce 10 billion litres of milk in comparison to the 5 billion litres of milk produced by 23,000 farmers prior to deregulation, a 30% reduction in farmers with a 55% rise in milk production. As the Australian dairy industry grows, feedlot systems are becoming more popular.

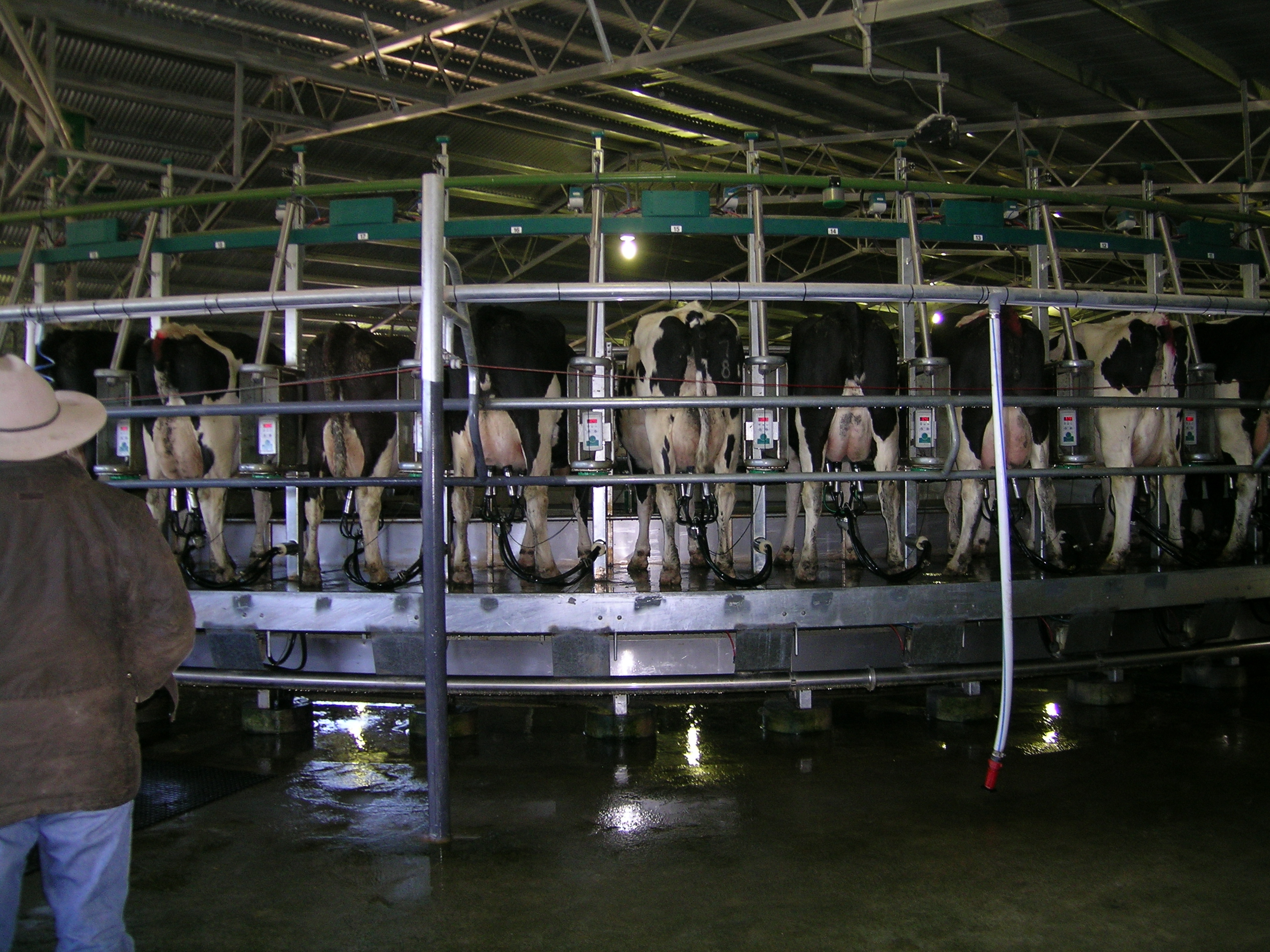
An 80-stand rotary dairy that is fully computerised and records milk production

==== Wool ====
Australian wool and sheepskin quarterly exports ($Millions) since 1969

Australia is the world's largest producer of wool. The Australian wool industry was worth $3.6 billion in 2022. The total number of sheep is estimated to be 75 million. In the late 1980s, the sheep flock was 180 million. Only 5% of Australia's wool clip is processed onshore. The Merino produces fine wool and was first introduced to Australia in 1797, with the breed being well-suited to the Australian environment. By the 1870s Australia had become the world's greatest wool-growing nation.

==== Other livestock ====
The number of pigs slaughtered (thousands) monthly in Australia since 1972

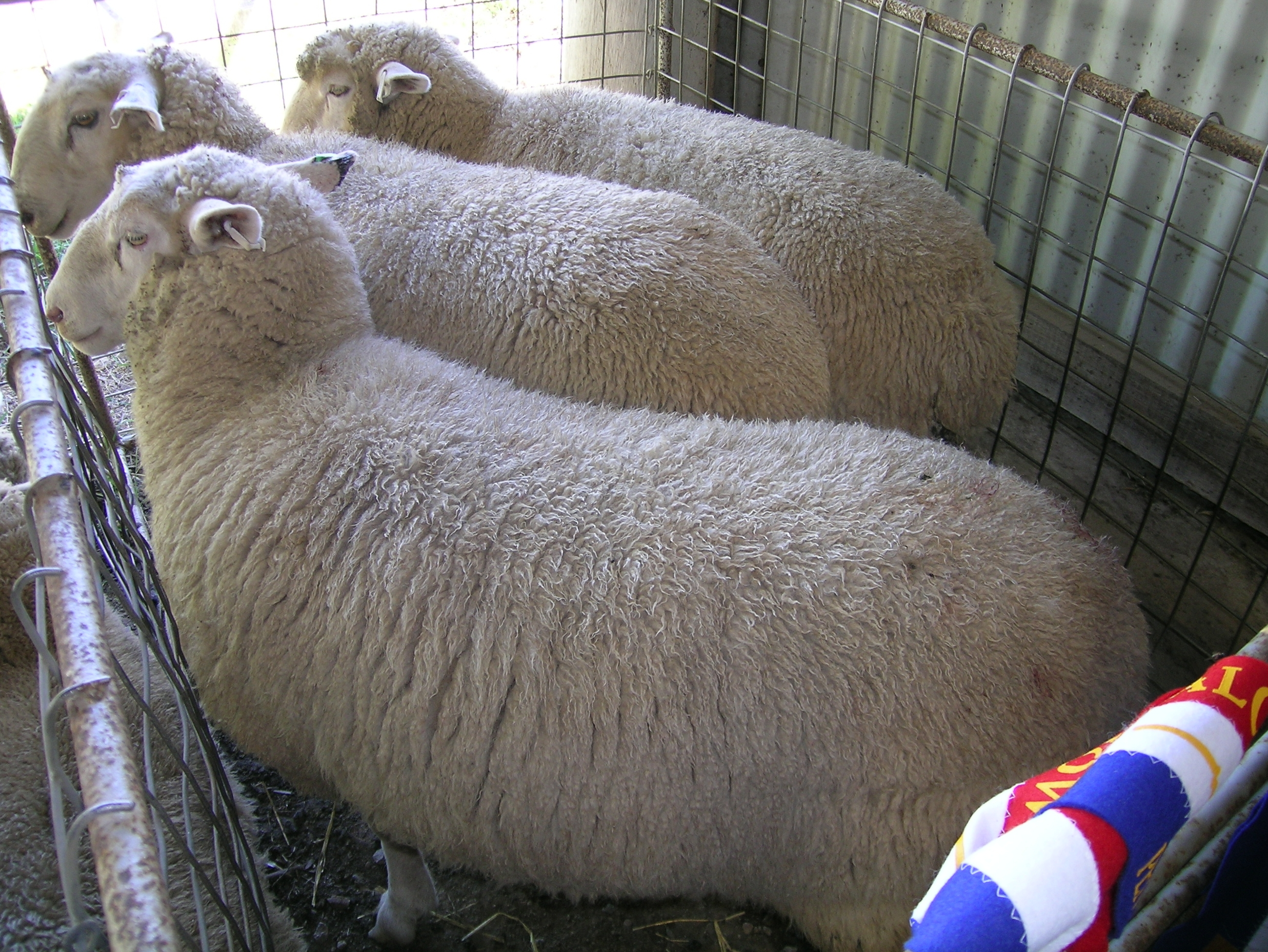
Prime lamb competition, New South Wales

=== Wild harvest and related industries ===
==== Fisheries ====
The fisheries in Australia are a significant industry. Australia produces many species of fish, including farmed and wild caught such as tuna and other schooling fish.

==== Seaweeds ====
The shorelines, especially the Great Barrier Reef, are providing motivation to help the continent by using seaweed (algae) to absorb nutrients. Because of the giant number of natural Australian seaweeds, not only could seaweed cultivation be used to help absorb nutrients around the GBR and other Australian shores, cultivation could also help feed a large part of the world. Even the Chinese, who could be considered far more advanced in seaweed cultivation, are interested in the future of Australian seaweeds. Lastly, the GBR itself, because of the delicate corals, has lent itself to utilising seaweed/algae purposely as a nutrient reduction tool in the form of algae.

== Issues facing Australian agriculture ==
The decline in farm employment (thousands of persons) since 1959

=== Political values ===
Historian F.K. Crowley finds that:

Australian farmers and their spokesman have always considered that life on the land is inherently more virtuous, more healthy, more important and more productive than living in the towns and cities. The farmers complained that something was wrong with an electoral system which produced parliamentarians who spent money beautifying vampire-cities instead of developing the interior.

The Country Party, from the 1920s to the 1970s, promulgated its version of agrarianism, which it called "countrymindedness". The goal was to enhance the status of the graziers (operators of sheep properties) and small farmers and justified subsidies for them.

=== Water management ===
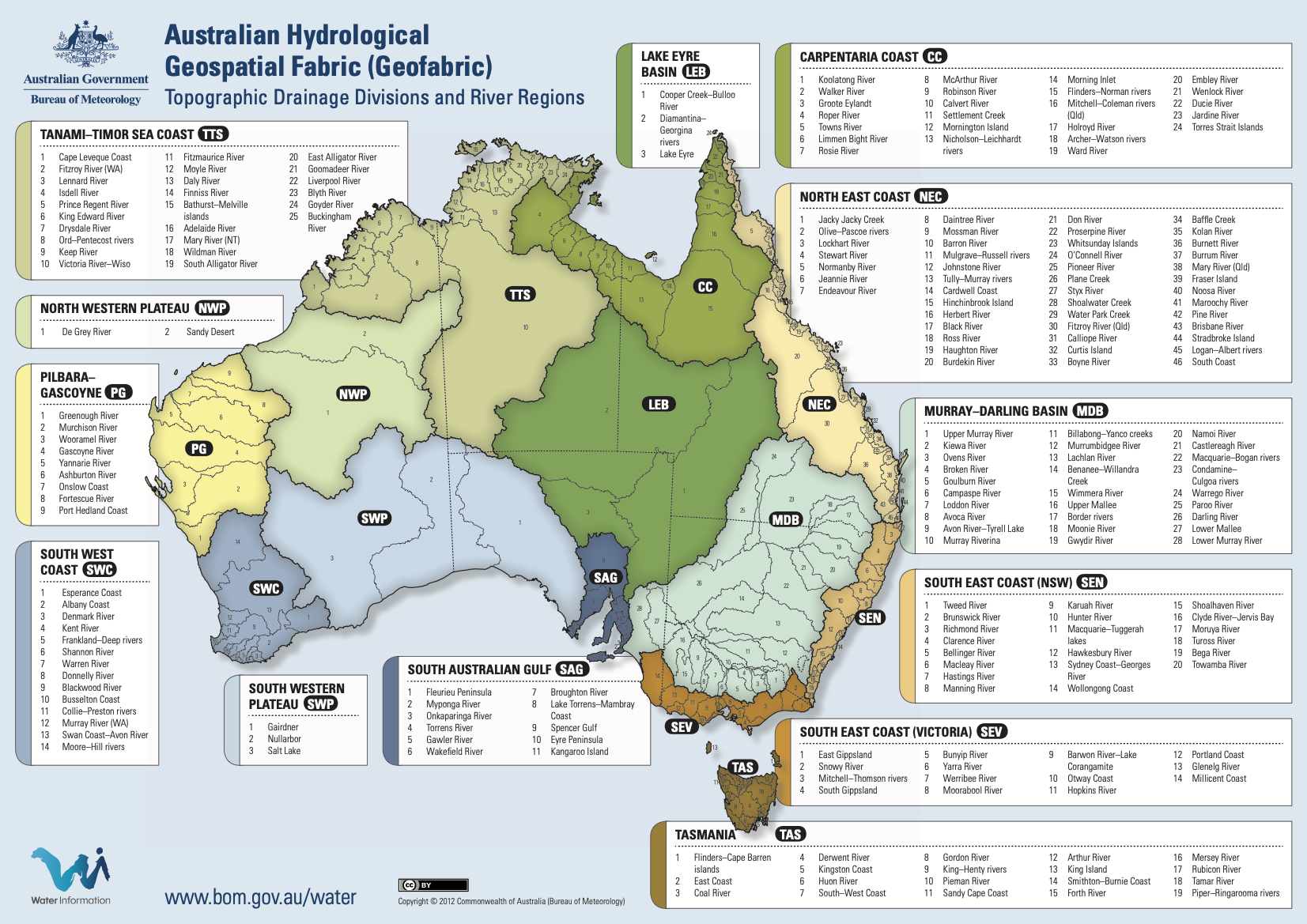
Australia's major water drainage divisions

Water management is a major issue in Australia. The nation is struggling with over-allocation issues and increasing variability. Effectively governing such issues has proven to be problematic. Public institutions responsible for water management include the Murray–Darling Basin Authority, which manages water resources in the Murray–Darling basin, Australia's largest river catchment.

Because of Australia's large deserts and irregular rainfall, irrigation is necessary for agriculture in some parts of the country. The total gross value of irrigated agricultural production in 2004-05 was A$9,076 million compared to A$9,618 million in 2000–01. The gross value of irrigated agricultural production represents around a quarter (23%) of the gross value of agricultural commodities produced in Australia in 2004–05, on less than 1% of agricultural land.

Of the 12,191 GL of water consumed by agriculture in 2004–05, dairy farming accounted for 18% (2,276 GL), pasture 16% (1,928 GL), cotton 15% (1,822 GL) and sugar 10% (1,269 GL).

=== Environmental issues ===
In 2006, the CSIRO, the federal government agency for scientific research in Australia, forecast that climate change will cause decreased precipitation over much of Australia and that this will exacerbate existing challenges to water availability and quality for agriculture.

Climate change has damaged farming productivity, reducing broadacre farm profits by an average of 22% since 2000. In 2023, the Department of Agriculture published a National Statement on Climate Change and Agriculture, exploring resilience in the agriculture sector.

Agriculture contributes 13% of Australia's total greenhouse emissions, however, much of this is methane of biological origin, rather than from fossil fuels.

Although native, kangaroos have been known to destroy fences and eat cattle feed, sometimes in problematic numbers.

=== Organic farming ===
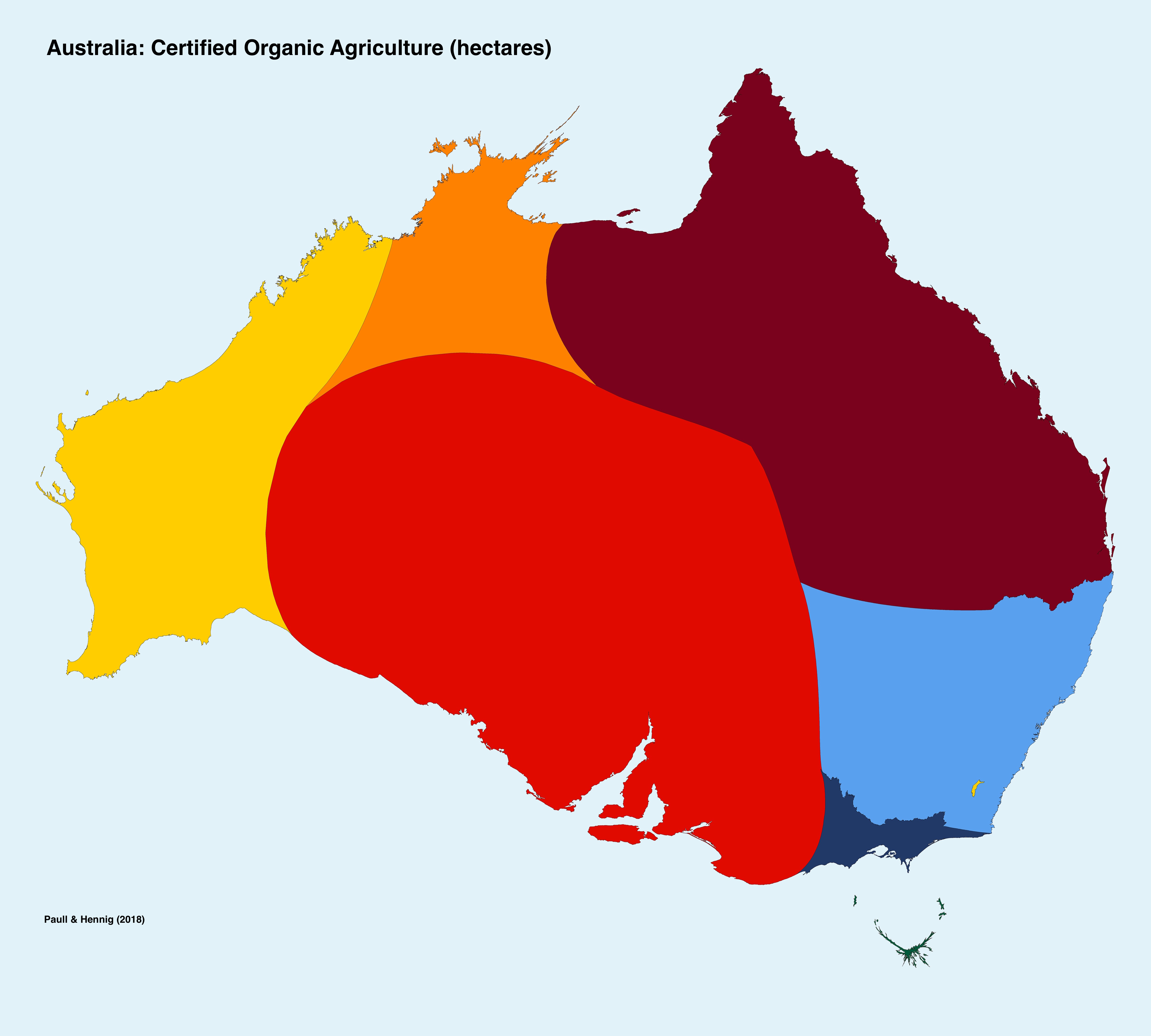
A density-equalising map of organic agriculture in Australia based on certified organic hectares. Australia accounts for more than half of the world's certified organic hectares.

As of 2021, $2.3 billion worth of commodities were produced in Australia by the organic agriculture sector, representing approximately 3% of agricultural output. Australia leads the world with 35 million hectares certified organic, which is 8.8% of Australia's agricultural land and Australia now accounts for more than half (51%) of the world's certified organic agriculture hectares.

=== Genetic modification ===
GM grains are widely grown in all states and territories in Australia with the exception of Tasmania, which is the last state to maintain a moratorium against GM. GM crops are regulated under a national scheme by the Gene Technology Regulator, through the Gene Technology Act 2000. As of 2022, there are four GM crops approved to be grown in Australia: cotton, safflower, carnations and canola. In particular, 99.5% of cotton growers in Australia use GM cotton.

=== Foreign land ownership ===
Australia has seen a major increase in foreign ownership of agriculture in the 2010s. According to a report in 2020, it was found that the amount of Australian agricultural land in foreign ownership, increased slightly from 13.4 to 13.8 percent.

A 2016 Lowy Institute poll found that 87% of respondents were against the Federal Government allowing foreign companies to buy Australian agricultural land a 6% points higher than a similar survey four years ago.

A 2022 ABC's Vote Compass Poll found that 88% of Australians want tighter controls on foreign ownership of farm land, which is an increase from Compass poll results in 2013 and 2016.

=== Animal welfare and live exports ===
Animal welfare has caused public concern, with exports of live animals particularly scrutinised. The practice of exporting live animals has received strong public opposition (a petition carrying 200,000 signatures of people opposed to live export was tabled in parliament) and opposition from the RSPCA because of cruelty.

In 2022, the Labor Party committed to ending live exports of sheep, if elected. In 2023, they commenced the process, however, it is not likely to be completed within the government's first term.

In 2006, animal rights organisations including PETA promoted a boycott of Merino wool, as a protest against the practice of mulesing, a procedure used to prevent the animals from becoming fly blown with maggots. In 2004, due to the worldwide attention, AWI proposed to phase out the practice by the end of year 2010; this promise was retracted in 2009.

In 2022, new regulations for chicken welfare were introduced.

=== Farm safety ===
Farming is the most dangerous occupation in Australia. 55 farmers died while working in 2022. Accidents involving tractors accounted for 20 per cent and quad bikes for 14 per cent of deaths.

=== Information Technology ===
Drone technology, self driver tractors, and online marketplaces are recent and growing trends. There is little standardisation and no accreditation authorities, though the CSIRO and other independent organisations have evaluated individual developments, the lack of a coordinated approach and lead agency restricts developments and risks Australia's competitiveness.

== Public governance ==
Before the Federation of Australia in 1901, individual state governments bore responsibility for agriculture. As part of the federation, the Department of Commerce and Agriculture was created to help develop the agricultural industry. The newly created Department of Trade and Customs had additional responsibilities for sugar agreements, as well as cotton.

These responsibilities were merged into a single agricultural department in 1956. Since the merger, the department responsible for agriculture has been renamed and re-structured many times:

- 1956–1974: Department of Primary Industry
- 1974–1975: Department of Agriculture
- 1975–1987: Department of Primary Industry
- 1987–1998: Department of Primary Industries and Energy
- 1998–2013: Department of Agriculture, Fisheries and Forestry
- 2013–2015: Department of Agriculture
- 2015–2019: Department of Agriculture and Water Resources
- 2019–2020: Department of Agriculture
- 2020–2022: Department of Agriculture, Water and the Environment
- 2022–present: Department of Agriculture, Fisheries and Forestry

== See also ==
- Effects of global warming on agriculture in Australia
- History of wheat industry regulation in Australia
- Wheatbelt
- Gardening in Australia
