= Biosecurity in Australia =

National biosecurity in Australia is governed and administered by two federal government departments, the Department of Health, Disability and Ageing and the Department of Agriculture, Fisheries and Forestry. The Biosecurity Act 2015 (C'wealth) and related legislation is administered by the two departments and manages biosecurity risks at the national border. The Act aims to manage biosecurity risks to human health, agriculture, native flora and fauna and the environment. It also covers Australia's international rights and obligations, and lists specific diseases which are contagious and capable of causing severe harm to human health. Each state and territory has additional legislation and protocols to cover biosecurity in their jurisdiction (post-border) including the detection of pests and diseases that have breached the national border.

The Intergovernmental Agreement on Biosecurity (IGAB) created a framework for governments to coordinate and identify priority areas of reform and action to build a stronger and more effective national biosecurity system, and established the National Biosecurity Committee (NBC) in 2012.

== Background ==
The term "biosecurity" was initially used in a narrower sense, to describe preventative and quarantine procedures put in place to minimise the risk of damage to crops, livestock and the environment by invasive pests or diseases that might enter any location. However, the term has evolved to include the oversight and control of biological threats to people and industries as well, including those from pandemic diseases and bioterrorism, whatever or wherever the origin of the organism causing the damage. Biosecurity is now understood as a process involving a defined set of measures and management strategies, designed not only to stop undesirable organisms from getting into the country, but also to quickly discover and eradicate them, or, if eradication proves impossible, to reduce their impact as much as possible.

Australia is to some degree protected from exotic pests and diseases by its geographic isolation, but with its island form comes a huge length of border (the coastline), with the sixth longest coastline in the world, at 25,780 kilometres (16,020 mi).

== History of governance ==
=== Legislation ===
In 2015, the Biosecurity Act 2015 (Commonwealth) replaced the Quarantine Act 1908, which was wholly repealed on 16 June 2016 by the Biosecurity (Consequential Amendments and Transitional Provisions) Act 2015. The new Act was a major reform of the Quarantine Act, in particular in its strengthening and modernising the existing framework of regulations governing biosecurity in Australia. New requirements included how the then Department of Agriculture and Water Resources would manage biosecurity risks associated with goods, people and vessels entering Australia.

The Biosecurity Bill 2014 passed through parliament on 14 May 2015 with bipartisan support, as possibly "one of the most substantial and significant pieces of legislation to pass through Parliament during the term of the [Abbott] Government". The Act did not radically change operational functions, but were more clearly described, with the aim of being easier to use and reducing the complexity of administering it. The main change relate was the compliance and enforcement of powers.

As recommended by the Beale Review (One Biosecurity: A Working Partnership, Roger Beale et al., 2008) and the earlier Nairn Report, the Act effected a risk-based approach, but includes several measures to manage unacceptable levels of biosecurity risk.

Each State and Territory has either a single Biosecurity Act or a suite of biosecurity-related statutes to manage biosecurity within Australia.

=== Administration ===
From August 2007 until September 2009, Biosecurity Australia, an agency of the Department of Agriculture, Fisheries and Forestry, provided science-based quarantine assessments and policy advice to protect plant and animal health in Australia, in order to protect the Australian agricultural economy and to enhance Australia's access to international animal- and plant-related markets. Import risk assessments (IRAs) by Biosecurity Australia included a variety of flora and fauna.

In September 2009, a division of DAFF known as Biosecurity Services Group took over its functions.

DAFF became the Department of Agriculture in September 2013, followed by the Department of Agriculture and Water Resources in September 2015, and then the Department of Agriculture (Australia, 2019–20), each of which was responsible for biosecurity.

== Current federal governance ==
National biosecurity in Australia is governed and administered by two federal departments, the Department of Health, Disability and Ageing and the Department of Agriculture, Fisheries and Forestry. They administer and enforce the various pieces of legislation in the Biosecurity Act 2015 and related ordinances, determinations and instruments.

=== Human health ===
The Department of Health defines biosecurity as "all the measures taken to minimise the risk of infectious diseases caused by viruses, bacteria or other micro-organisms entering, emerging, establishing or spreading in Australia, potentially harming the Australian population, our food security and economy". These risks may enter Australia after people enter the countries from other places (whether on holiday or any other reason), having developed infections through food, water, insect bites, or contact with animals or other people. Often the infection is unknown because it is not obvious, and the infected person is not aware of it themselves, until they become unwell some time later. Some of these diseases may be serious, and biosecurity measures are necessary to ensure that the infection does not spread throughout the population.

The Act lists specific diseases (Listed Human Diseases, or LHDs) which are contagious and can cause significant harm to human health; as of March 2020, these LHDs include:

- human influenza with pandemic potential
- plague
- severe acute respiratory syndrome (SARS)
- Middle East respiratory syndrome (MERS)
- smallpox
- viral haemorrhagic fevers (VHDs)
- yellow fever
- human coronavirus with pandemic potential (Note: Note: The coronavirus group includes SARS, MERS, and COVID-19.)

Biosecurity Officers from the Department of Agriculture, Fisheries and Forestry must be informed by any aircraft captain or ship's master, should any of their passengers show signs of an infectious disease.

Human biosecurity in Australia covers protective measures enforced at the border, travel information and warnings, the import and export of human remains, national public health emergency response planning at the borders and Australia's international obligations, in particular the International Health Regulations (IHR). A Joint External Evaluation (JEE) e following the 2013–2016 Western African Ebola virus epidemic showed that Australia has very high level of capacity of response. Australia's National Action Plan for Health Security 2019–2023 was developed to help to implement the recommendations from the JEE. Management of ill travellers is one aspect of human biosecurity management; prevention of potential disease vectors (such as exotic mosquitoes) is another.

==== COVID-19 pandemic ====
One of the biggest threats to human health in the history of Australia arose with the COVID-19 pandemic in Australia in March 2020. The Federal Government under Scott Morrison invoked the Biosecurity Act 2015 to announce a state of emergency, and brought in various measures to restrict the movement of people in and out of Australia.

On 30 April 2021, following a dramatic rise in cases in a second wave of the COVID-19 pandemic, the Federal Government announced a ban on Australian citizens and permanent residents in India from entering Australia via any route, between 3 May and 15 May. Those caught returning from India to Australia via any route would be subject to punishment under the Biosecurity Act, with penalties for breaches including up to five years' jail, a fine of A$66,600, or both. On 7 May 2021 Morrison announced that the flight ban would end on 15 May and that repatriation flights to the Northern Territory would start on this date.

=== Agriculture ===
==== Animals ====
Animal biosecurity involves protecting livestock, wildlife, humans and the environment from new diseases or pests. Australia has remained free of many of the serious animal diseases, such as foot and mouth disease and avian influenza (bird flu), but occurrence of one of these diseases would result in significant damage to the economy, as trade would have to be ceased in the affected products. Australia has already experienced outbreaks of animal disease events such as the 2007 Australian equine influenza outbreak and when bird flu was found on poultry farms in New South Wales, leading to widespread culling.

New diseases in livestock, often first arising in wild species, may also affect human health, when they are known as zoonotic diseases. These include bird flu, SARS and Hendra virus, the effects of which can be deadly.

In November 2016, white spot virus was detected on a prawn farm on the Logan River in south-east Queensland for the first time in the country. By March 2021 it was also being detected in Deception Bay and was widespread in Moreton Bay, in the Brisbane area. The federal government was reviewing its import requirements, and farmers and fishers were lobbying for the inclusion of a requirement that imported prawns should be cooked.

==== Plants ====
Plant industries, in particular the wheat industry and also horticulture, wine, cotton and sugar industries, can be negatively impacted by pests and diseases, as they lead to poorer quality food, less of it, higher costs to produce it, and reduced trade. Australia has remained free of many of the most harmful pest species, such as citrus greening and varroa mite (with Australia the only continent free of this pest affecting honeybee productivity).

==== Food safety ====
The Department of Agriculture, Fisheries and Forestry is also responsible for food safety coordination in Australia with State and Territory Governments responsible for ensuring food safety standards and recalls. It works with industry and other government agencies, in particular the Department of Health, Disability and Ageing, and Food Standards Australia New Zealand (FSANZ), to develop policy and food standards, and the regulatory system involves the governments of Australia, New Zealand and the Australian states and territories. The department administers relevant legislation at the Australian border, and imported food must meet Australia's biosecurity requirements under the Biosecurity Act 2015, as well as food safety requirements of the Imported Food Control Act 1992.

== Agricultural and environmental biosecurity coordination ==
=== Intergovernmental Agreement on Biosecurity (IGAB) ===
The Intergovernmental Agreement on Biosecurity (IGAB) was created in January 2012. It was an agreement between the federal, state and territory governments, with the exception of Tasmania, intended to "improve the national biosecurity system by identifying the roles and responsibilities of governments and outline the priority areas for collaboration to minimise the impact of pests and disease on Australia's economy, environment and the community". It was focussed on controlling animal and plant pests rather than human biosecurity, as it was considered that this aspect was already covered by existing agreements, and set out to improve collaboration and understanding of shared responsibilities among all parties, including industry stakeholders.

The 2012 IGAB created a framework for governments to coordinate and identify priority areas of reform and action to build a stronger and more effective national biosecurity system. The agreement comprised two parts: the first part established the goal, objectives and principles of the system, as well as the purpose and scope of the agreement; the second part, the schedules, outlined the priority work areas for governments and their key decision-making committee, the NBC (National Biosecurity Committee). The work based on IGAB led to the development of significant and sound national policy principles and frameworks, including the National Environmental Biosecurity Response Agreement (NEBRA).

=== 2017 review ===
An independent review of Australia's biosecurity system and the underpinning IGAB undertaken in 2017, resulting in the Priorities for Australia's biosecurity system report, noted that the "application of shared responsibility for biosecurity is difficult and challenging,... primarily because the roles and responsibilities of participants across the national biosecurity system are not clearly understood, accepted, or consistently recognised across the system by all involved". The review examined many aspects of the existing system.

Excluded from the review were:

- biosecurity arrangements specific to human health;
- biosecurity Import Risk Analyses (BIRAs);
- comprehensive reviews of emergency responses deeds;
- response plans, such as the Australian Veterinary Emergency Plan (AUSVETPLAN);
- matters to do with specific biosecurity legislation; and
- matters to do with Australia's international obligations relating to biosecurity.

It explicitly states that its recommendations were not intended to change or impact on human health arrangements in the health department or between the departments of agriculture and health.

The report, under a section titled "Market Access is key", said that Australia's world class biosecurity system is a trade and economic asset, but that there was scope for improvement.

The report named a number of challenges and topics needing future focus, such as environmental biosecurity (which includes both natural ecosystems and social amenities), which has been viewed as subordinate to agricultural biosecurity in the national biosecurity system, and thus received less funding. Among its recommendations was the appointment of a new position of Chief Community and Environmental Biosecurity Officer (CCEBO) within the environment department, to perform a national policy leadership role similar to the Chief Veterinary Officer and Chief Plant Protection Officer in the national biosecurity system.

The report stated that Australia has a mixture of biosecurity strategies and policies that have been tailor-made for each jurisdiction, taxon and/or agency, and that an agreed national approach for prioritising exotic pest and disease risks is desirable, to guide governments' investments. In the area of research, it concluded that the system "no longer [had] the required structure, focus or capacity to address existing and emerging national biosecurity challenges" with "many players but no captain". It recommended several steps for improved governance, including that the NBC should improve its transparency and accountability, including making more information publicly available". In all, it published 41 recommendations to improve Australia's biosecurity system.

Managing biosecurity risk has become more challenging due to increasing risks, the changing nature of risks, and increases in associated management costs. Factors such as globalisation, international and interstate migration, climate change, tourism, and the increasing movement of goods are all contributing to increases in biosecurity risks.

While the IGAB and NBC had been pivotal in fostering improved government collaboration, there was room for the NBC to improve its transparency and accountability, making more information publicly available. The IGAB had provided a strong mandate for advancing national biosecurity capacity and capability, which critically impacts whole-of economy and whole-of-government arrangements, affecting trade and market access, tourism, agricultural productivity, human health, environmental quality, biodiversity and social amenity.

The report considered future challenges, funding measures, governance and performance measurement, listed 42 recommendations, and outlined an implementation pathway for its recommendations, and the potential features of a future system.

In June 2018, the role of Chief Environmental Biosecurity Officer (CEBO) was created to oversee environmental biosecurity, with Ian Thompson appointed to the role.

=== IGAB2 ===
A second agreement was effected in January 2019, known as IGAB2, with all states and governments as signatories, following the review.

=== National Biosecurity Committee (NBC) ===
The National Biosecurity Committee (NBC) was established under the IGAB in 2012. The NBC is "responsible for managing a national, strategic approach to biosecurity threats relating to plant and animal pests and diseases, marine pests and aquatics, and the impact of these on agricultural production, the environment, community well-being and social amenity", with one of its core objectives being to cooperation, coordination and consistency among the various government agencies involved.

The Secretary of the Department of Agriculture, Fisheries and Forestry chairs the NBC and up to two senior officials from the federal, state and territory primary industry and/or environment agencies and jurisdictions. It provides advice on national biosecurity matters, and provides updates on progress towards implementing the recommendations of the 2017 Review to the Agriculture Senior Officials Committee.

== State-based agencies and legislation ==
=== Summary of state-based legislation ===
State and Territory Governments have authority for biosecurity within their jurisdiction and administer specific biosecurity legislation to manage pests and diseases, including the movement of goods, plants and animals between States that pose a biosecurity risk.

As of May 2020, the NSW, WA, Queensland and Tasmanian Governments have developed and passed consolidated Biosecurity Acts. The Australian Capital Territory Government has developed a framework for a new Act, which will closely align with the New South Wales legislation. The Government of South Australia is in the process of developing a new Act.

=== ACT ===
The Environment, Planning and Sustainable Development Directorate of the Australian Capital Territory is responsible for biosecurity. As of May 2020, two Acts provide the mechanisms "to protect the health and welfare of people and animals and to protect markets relating to animals and plants and associated products": the Animal Diseases Act 2005 and the Plant Diseases Act 2002, while the Pest Plants and Animals Act 2005 protects land and aquatic resources from threats posed by animal and plant pests in the ACT.

Between 2017 and 2019, consultation took place on proposals for a new ACT Biosecurity Act, to manage biosecurity as a shared responsibility consistent with approaches taken by the other states and the Commonwealth.

=== New South Wales ===
- The NSW Department of Primary Industries is the primary agency responsible for biosecurity in the state, executing its functions under the Biosecurity Act 2015 (NSW), which came into effect on 1 June 2017. In addition, the Public Health Act 2010 was amended in September 2017 to expand the scope of public health orders relating to relate to a few very serious notifiable (Category 4 and 5) conditions, such as MERS or Ebola, to enable people to be detained as a public health risk, where they do not cooperate with voluntary quarantine. The changes were made to bring the Public Health Act into line with the federal Biosecurity Act 2015.
  - During the COVID-19 pandemic in Australia, a serious breach of biosecurity occurred when the cruise ship Ruby Princess was allowed to dock and its 2,777 passengers to disembark, despite some passengers having been diagnosed with COVID-19, with serious consequences. Australian Border Force is responsible for passport control and customs, while the federal Department of Agriculture is responsible for biosecurity; however, it is up to each state's health department to prevent illness in the community. Responsibility for the breakdown in communications will be determined by a later enquiry.

=== Queensland ===
- Biosecurity Queensland, which is part of the Department of Primary Industries, is responsible for biosecurity in the state. The state's Biosecurity Act 2014 and the Queensland Biosecurity Strategy 2018-2023 govern and guide the department's responsibilities with regard to biosecurity in Queensland.
- Queensland has had frequent biosecurity incursions affecting a wide range of crops and livestock including Fall armyworm, Myrtle rust, Panama TR4 Disease and Red Imported Fire Ants.
- Queensland Health liaises with the Department of Primary Industries in biosecurity matters which relate to public health (whether by human or animal transmission, for example diphtheria), issues health alerts to the public and provides advice regarding travel and other restrictions on residents' activities relating to biosecurity risk.

=== Northern Territory ===
- The Department of Primary Industry and Resources and the Department of Environment and Natural Resources are responsible for biosecurity in the Northern Territory of Australia. Banana freckle disease, Cucumber green mottle mosaic virus, browsing ant (Lepisiota frauenfeldi) and Asian honey bee have been recent threats to agriculture and the environment. The Northern Territory Biosecurity Strategy 2016–2026 was developed in order to address increasing biosecurity risks.

=== South Australia ===
- Primary Industries and Regions SA (PIRSA) manages the risks related to animal and plant pests and diseases, food-borne illnesses, and misuse of rural chemicals in South Australia. As of 2020, PIRSA is managing a review of current biosecurity legislation in South Australia, which has been covered by multiple pieces of legislation, with the aim of creating a new single and cohesive Biosecurity Act for the state based on the current policy developed by PIRSA. The discussion paper was published in 2019.
- SA Health, "the brand name for the health portfolio of services and agencies responsible to...the Minister for Health and Wellbeing", says that Biosecurity SA, under PIRSA, is responsible for managing the "risks and potential harm to the South Australian community, environment, and economy from pests and diseases". It cites a partnership known as "One Health", supported by the Zoonoses Working Group, which supports collaboration and coordination among stakeholders with regard to human, animal and environmental health.

=== Tasmania ===
- The island state of Tasmania has extremely stringent biosecurity requirements. The Department of Primary Industries, Parks, Water and Environment (DPIPWE) is the parent department of the Biosecurity Tasmania agency. Tasmania's Biosecurity Act 2019 (assented to 26 August 2019) replaced seven separate Acts, whose regulations are still being applied until full implementation of the Act, expected around 2023. One of the key products of the Act was the creation of the Biosecurity Advisory Committee.
- The State has benefited from its geographic isolation but has seen a number of incursions more recently including Blueberry rust (with one incursion successfully eradicated), Myrtle Rust, European Red Fox (eradicated), Indian myna (eradicated) and Queensland fruit fly (eradicated).

=== Victoria ===
- Agriculture Victoria, an agency of the Department of Energy, Environment and Climate Action is responsible for managing biosecurity in Victoria. The executive director, Biosecurity Services is in charge of biosecurity. The Victorian Chief Plant Health Officer Unit (CPHO), who exercises powers provided by the Plant Biosecurity Act 2010 and Plant Biosecurity Regulations 2016, is the technical lead on plant health management in Victoria.
- Victoria's Chief Health Officer is also Chief Human Biosecurity Officer for Victoria.

=== Western Australia ===
- The Biosecurity Council of Western Australia was established on 27 February 2008 as a specialist advisory group to the Minister for Agriculture and Food and the Director-General of the Department of Primary Industries and Regional Development, under the Biosecurity and Agriculture Management Act 2007 (BAM Act). The Biosecurity and Agriculture Management Regulations 2013 support the Act. The BAM Act replaced 16 older Acts and 27 sets of regulations with one Act and nine sets of regulations.
- Within the Department of Health, the State Health Coordinator and State Human Epidemic Controller form part of the Hazard Management Structure created by the State Emergency Management Committee (SEMC), which was established by the Emergency Management Act 2005 (EM Act). The State Hazard Plan was created in 2019.

== CSIRO ==
The Commonwealth Scientific and Industrial Research Organisation (CSIRO), the government agency responsible for scientific research, collaborates with the relevant government departments, as well as industry, universities and other international agencies, to help protect Australian people, livestock, plants and the environment.

In 2014, CSIRO produced an 87-page document titled Australia's Biosecurity Future: Preparing for Future Biological Challenges.

== Past and present threats ==
=== 2020: Coronavirus ===
On 18 March 2020, a human biosecurity emergency was declared in Australia owing to the risks to human health posed by the COVID-19 pandemic, after the National Security Committee met the previous day. The Biosecurity Act 2015 specifies that the Governor-General may declare such an emergency exists if the Health Minister (at the time Greg Hunt) is satisfied that "a listed human disease is posing a severe and immediate threat, or is causing harm, to human health on a nationally significant scale". This gives the Minister sweeping powers, including imposing restrictions or preventing the movement of people and goods between specified places, and evacuations. The Biosecurity (Human Biosecurity Emergency) (Human Coronavirus with Pandemic Potential) Declaration 2020 was declared by the Governor-General, David Hurley, under Section 475 of the Act. The Act only allows for three months, but may be extended for a further three if the Governor-General is satisfied that it is required.

The Biosecurity (Human Biosecurity Emergency) (Human Coronavirus with Pandemic Potential) (Emergency Requirements) Determination 2020, made by the Health Minister on the same day, forbids international cruise ships from entering Australian ports before 15 April 2020.

On 25 March 2020, the Health Minister made a second determination, the Biosecurity (Human Biosecurity Emergency) (Human Coronavirus with Pandemic Potential) (Overseas Travel Ban Emergency Requirements) Determination 2020, which "forbids Australian citizens and permanent residents from leaving Australian territory by air or sea as a passenger".

On 25 April 2020, the Biosecurity (Human Biosecurity Emergency) (Human Coronavirus with Pandemic Potential) (Emergency Requirements—Public Health Contact Information) Determination 2020, made under subsection 477(1) of the Act, was signed into law by the Health Minister. The purpose of the new legislation is "to make contact tracing faster and more effective by encouraging public acceptance and uptake of COVIDSafe", COVIDSafe being the new mobile app created for the purpose. The function of the app is to record contact between any two people who both have the app on their phones when they come within 1.5 metres (4 ft 11 in) of each other. The encrypted data would remain on the phone for 21 days of not encountering a person logged with confirmed COVID-19.

From 2020 until 2023, the (federal) Department of Health has a page devoted to the pandemic, which was previously updated daily.

The state and territory governments used existing legislation relating to public health emergencies in order to bring in various measures in March.

- In South Australia, a public health emergency was declared on 15 March 2020, under Section 87 of the Public Health Act 2011 (SA). SA Health is responsible for the provision, maintenance and coordination of health services under the Emergency Management Act 2004 the State Emergency Management Plan (SEMP). A dedicated web page to provide information for the community and health professionals was created, with linked pages to key information updated daily. On 27 March 2020, using the Emergency Management Act 2004, the State Coordinator, Commissioner of South Australia Police Grant Stevens, made a direction to prohibit gatherings of more than 10 people, and with a limit of one person per 4 square metres.
- In Victoria, a state of emergency was declared on 16 March under the Public Health and Wellbeing Act 2008 (Vic), allowing health officials to "detain people, search premises without a warrant, and force people or areas into lockdown if it is considered necessary to protect public health". The state of emergency was for four weeks to 13 April, and on 12 April was extended by four weeks to 11 May.
- On 18 March 2020, New South Wales used Section 7 of their Public Health Act 2010 to require the immediate cancellation of major events with more than 500 people outdoors, and more than 100 people indoors. NSW Health has a page dedicated to COVID-19.

=== Highly Pathogenic Avian Influenza (HPAI) ===
Whilst Australia regularly detects Low Pathogencity Avian Influenza in Australia, HPAI is rarely detected. The H5 HPAI strain that is causing significant impacts worldwide has not been detected in Australia although it is considered an imminent threat due to migratory birds carrying the virus from Antarctica or other locations and significant government and industry investment is occurring to prepare for an outbreak. The H7 strain of HPAI has been detected on a number of occasions in Victoria, NSW and the ACT and successfully eradicated in each instance.

== See also ==
- Australian Plague Locust Commission
- Centre of Excellence for Biosecurity Risk Analysis (CEBRA), at the University of Melbourne
- Food safety in Australia
- Food Standards Australia New Zealand
- List of Australian Commonwealth Government entities
