= Department of Agriculture, Fisheries and Forestry (Australia, 1998–2013) =

Former Australian government department

Department of Agriculture, Fisheries and Forestry (DAFF)

Department overview
- Formed: 21 October 1998
- Preceding Department: Department of Primary Industries and Energy
- Dissolved: 18 September 2013
- Superseding Department: Department of Agriculture
- Jurisdiction: Commonwealth of Australia
- Employees: 5,185 (at April 2013)
- Department executive: Andrew Metcalfe, Secretary (2013); Conall O'Connell, Secretary (2007–2013); Joanna Hewitt, Secretary (2004–2007); Mike Taylor, Secretary (2000–2004); Ken Matthews, Secretary (1998–1999)
- Child agencies: BRS – Bureau of Rural Sciences; Biosecurity Australia; AFMA – Australian Fisheries Management Authority; Wheat Exports Australia; Australian Pesticides and Veterinary Medicines Authority; Cotton Research and Development Corporation; Fisheries Research and Development Corporation; Grains Research and Development Corporation; Grape and Wine Research and Development Corporation; Rural Industries Research and Development Corporation; Sugar Research and Development Corporation; Wine Australia Corporation
- Website: Official website

The Department of Agriculture, Fisheries and Forestry (DAFF) was an Australian government department that existed between 1998 and 2013, when it was renamed as the Department of Agriculture. DAFF's role was to develop and implement policies and programs that ensure Australia's agricultural, fisheries, food and forestry industries remained competitive, profitable and sustainable.

DAFF policies and programs were to:

- encourage and support sustainable natural resource use and management
- protect the health and safety of plant and animal industries
- enable industries to adapt to compete in a fast-changing international and economic environment
- help improve market access and market performance for the agricultural and food sector
- encourage and assist industries to adopt new technology and practices
- assist primary producers and the food industry to develop business and marketing skills, and to be financially self-reliant.

== Scope ==
DAFF facilitated the development of self-reliant, profitable, competitive and sustainable Australian farm businesses and industries. Through consultation with industry, DAFF developed and implemented policies and programs that helped to assure product safety and integrity. Particular emphasis was placed on on-farm risk management that related to food safety.

Divisions which fell within the broader department included: Sustainable Resource Management (Fisheries), Climate Change (Drought Assistance, Australia's Farming Future, Forestry), Agricultural Productivity (FarmReady, Animal Welfare, Crops Horticulture & Wine, Food) and Trade & Market Access (Free Trade Agreements). DAFF's Biosecurity function, which was previously performed by AQIS, managed quarantine controls at Australia's borders to minimise the risk of exotic pests and diseases entering the country. DAFF also provided import and export inspection and certification to help retain Australia's highly favourable animal, plant and human health status and wide access to overseas export markets.

At its creation, the department dealt with the following principal matters:

- Agricultural, pastoral, fishing, food and forest industries
- Water, soils and other natural resources
- Rural adjustment and drought issues
- Rural industries inspection and quarantine
- Primary industries research including economic research
- Commodity marketing, including export promotion end agribusiness
- Commodity-specific international organisations and activities
- Administration of international commodity agreements
- Administration of export controls on agricultural, fisheries and forestry industries products
- Food policy, processing and exports

=== Biosecurity role ===
DAFF managed quarantine controls at Australia's borders to minimise the risk of exotic pests and diseases entering the country. DAFF also provided import and export inspection and certification to help retain Australia's highly favourable animal, plant and human health status and wide access to overseas export markets.

DAFF continuously looked to improve the effectiveness of the quarantine effort by working closely with other areas within DAFF to manage Australia's biosecurity system. The department also worked closely with other Australian government agencies – such as Australian Customs and Border Protection Service, Department of Health and Ageing, Food Standards Australia and New Zealand (FSANZ) and state/territory governments – to support their management of post–border detections and incursions of quarantine pests and diseases, and to support our own verification and certification activities for agriculture and food products.

== Previous agencies ==
- Department of Primary Industry (11 January 1956 – 2 June 1974)
- Department of Agriculture (12 June 1974 – 22 December 1975)
- Department of Primary Industry (22 December 1975 – 24 July 1987)
- Department of Primary Industries and Energy (24 July 1987 – 21 October 1998)

== Subsequent agencies ==
- Department of Agriculture (18 September 2013 – 21 September 2015)
- Department of Agriculture and Water Resources (21 September 2015 – 29 May 2019)
