= Department of Agriculture, Water and the Environment =

Australian government department

Department overview
- Formed: 1 February 2020
- Preceding agencies: Department of Agriculture; Department of the Environment and Energy
- Dissolved: 1 July 2022
- Superseding agencies: Department of Agriculture, Fisheries and Forestry; Department of Climate Change, Energy, the Environment and Water
- Jurisdiction: Australia
- Employees: 6,221 (2021)
- Annual budget: A$4.461 billion (2021)
- Ministers responsible: Murray Watt, Minister for Agriculture, Fisheries and Forestry and Minister for Emergency Management; Madeleine King, Minister for Resources and Minister for Northern Australia; Tanya Plibersek, Minister for the Environment and Water
- Department executive: Andrew Metcalfe AO, Secretary (2020–2022)
- Website: www.awe.gov.au

The Australian Department of Agriculture, Water and the Environment (DAWE) was an Australian Government department which operated from 1 February 2020 until 30 June 2022. It represented Australia's national interests in agriculture, water and the environment.

On 1 July 2022, the agriculture and water component became the Department of Agriculture, Fisheries and Forestry (DAFF), while the environment component became the new Department of Climate Change, Energy, the Environment and Water.

== Organisation, key people, functions ==
The Department represents Australia's national interests across agriculture, water and the environment.

The Secretary of the Department of Agriculture, Water and Environment, Andrew Metcalfe AO, is responsible to the Minister for Agriculture, Drought and Emergency Management, Murray Watt.

It is sometimes referred to by the acronym DAWE.

=== Functions ===
The department is responsible for the Commonwealth's regulation and oversight of:

- Agricultural, pastoral, fishing, food and forest industries
- Soils and other natural resources
- Rural adjustment and drought issues
- Rural industries inspection and quarantine
- Primary industries research including economic research
- Commodity marketing, including export promotion and agribusiness
- Commodity-specific international organisations and activities
- Administration of international commodity agreements
- Administration of export controls on agricultural, fisheries and forestry industries products
- Food security policy and programmes
- Water policy and resources
- Biosecurity, in relation to animals and plants
- Environment protection and conservation of biodiversity
- Air quality
- National fuel quality standards
- Land contamination
- Meteorology
- Administration of the Australian Antarctic Territory, and the Territory of Heard Island and McDonald Islands
- Natural, built and cultural heritage
- Environmental information and research
- Ionospheric prediction
- Co-ordination of sustainable communities policy
- Urban environment
- Environmental water use and resources relating to the Commonwealth Environmental Water Holder

It is also responsible for maintaining the Australian Heritage Database.

=== Food safety and biosecurity ===
The department is responsible for food safety in Australia. It works with industry and other Australian government agencies, in particular the Department of Health and Food Standards Australia New Zealand (FSANZ) to develop policy and food standards. Food standards are developed under the Australia New Zealand Food Standards Code, administered by FSANZ and enforced by state and territory governments.

Together with the Department of Health, the Department administers biosecurity in Australia. The department administers relevant legislation at the Australian border, and imported food must meet Australia's biosecurity requirements (under the Biosecurity Act 2015), as well as food safety requirements of the Imported Food Control Act 1992. Labelling on imported food must comply the requirements, and is regulated under the Imported Food Inspection Scheme.

=== Portfolio agencies ===
Agencies that exist within the department include:

- Bureau of Meteorology
- Director of National Parks
- Murray-Darling Basin Authority
- Great Barrier Reef Marine Park Authority
- Sydney Harbour Federation Trust
- Australian Antarctic Division
- Australian Bureau of Agricultural and Resource Economics and Sciences
- Australian Fisheries Management Authority
- Australian Pesticides & Veterinary Medicines Authority
- Australia's Nature Hub
- National Landcare Program
- National Pollutant Inventory
- Physical Environment Analysis Network
- Sustainable Development Goals
- Forest and Wood Products Council
- Regional Investment Corporation
- National Environmental Protection Council

== History ==
=== Preceding departments – Agriculture ===
- Department of Markets and Migration (16 January 1925 – 19 January 1928)
- Department of Markets (19 January 1928 – 10 December 1928)
- Department of Markets and Transport (10 December 1928 – 21 April 1930)
- Department of Markets (21 April 1930 – 13 April 1932)
- Department of Commerce (13 April 1932 – 22 December 1942)
- Department of Commerce and Agriculture (22 December 1942 – 11 January 1956)
- Department of Primary Industry (11 January 1956 – 2 June 1974)
- Department of Agriculture (12 June 1974 – 22 December 1975)
- Department of Primary Industry (22 December 1975 – 24 July 1987)
- Department of Primary Industries and Energy (24 July 1987 – 21 October 1998)
- Department of Agriculture, Fisheries and Forestry (21 October 1998 – 18 September 2013)
- Department of Agriculture (18 September 2013 – 21 September 2015)
- Department of Agriculture and Water Resources (21 September 2015 – 29 May 2019)
- Department of Agriculture (29 May 2019 – 1 February 2020)

=== Preceding departments – Environment ===
- Department of the Environment and Energy (19 July 2016 – 1 February 2020)

=== Formation ===
The department was formed by way of an administrative order issued on 5 December 2019 and effective from 1 February 2020. The new department took over all functions of the previous Department of Agriculture, and the environment functions of the previous Department of the Environment and Energy.

== See also ==
- Australian Bureau of Agricultural and Resource Economics
- Australian Fisheries Management Authority
- Director of National Parks (includes Parks Australia)
- List of Australian Commonwealth Government entities
- Minister for Agriculture and Water Resources
- Murray-Darling Basin Authority
