= Centre of Excellence for Biosecurity Risk Analysis =

Research institute at the University of Melbourne

The Centre of Excellence for Biosecurity Risk Analysis (CEBRA), formerly Australian Centre of Excellence for Risk Analysis (ACERA), is a research institute within the School of Biosciences at the University of Melbourne in Melbourne, Victoria, Australia. It conducts research on a wide range of topics in risk, with an initial focus on biosecurity risks.

== History ==
ACERA was founded in 2006 to honour a federal government election commitment on biosecurity risk, with a grant administered through the Bureau of Rural Sciences of the Federal Department of Agriculture, Fisheries and Forestry and the University of Melbourne. The centre received a second phase of funding commencing in July 2009 and ending June 2013. The centre was established in the then School of Botany at the university in March 2006 until 30 June 2013.

ACERA was funded by the now Department of Agriculture, Water and the Environment (DAWE) and the University of Melbourne. The first Director was Mark Burgman.

CEBRA was established in July 2013, in the 2013–2021 funding round.

== Organisation and description ==
CEBRA is funded by the Department of Agriculture, Water and the Environment, New Zealand's Ministry for Primary Industries and the University of Melbourne. The centre is within the School of Biosciences at the university.

As of 2024, the CEO is Andrew Robinson, with Susie Hester, Tom Kompas, Richard Bradhurst, and James Camac as chief investigators.

CEBRA "ensures that Australian biosecurity regulatory standards, procedures and tools are underpinned by world-class research and understanding of the issues, risks and response mechanisms". Its main objective is "to deliver practical solutions and advice for assessing and managing biosecurity risks that inform the risk management role of the department and ministry".
