= Daryl Quinlivan =

Australian public servant

Daryl Quinlivan AO

Secretary of the Department of Agriculture (2019–)

Secretary of the Department of Agriculture and Water Resources

Secretary of the Department of Agriculture (2013–15)
- In office 12 June 2015 – Current

Personal details
- Education: Monash University; Australian National University
- Occupation: Public servant

Daryl Paul Quinlivan AO is a senior Australian public servant. He was the Secretary of the former Department of Agriculture, having been appointed in June 2015 to the previous Department of Agriculture which was known as the Department of Agriculture and Water Resources between 2015 and 2019. He had a varied career across the Australian Public Service before his appointment.

== Life and career ==
Quinlivan studied for a Bachelor of Arts (Hons) at Monash University, and a Bachelor of Economics from the Australian National University.

In the Department of Transport and Regional Services, Quinlivan was responsible for the Corporate Division, and also advised on the East Coast Very High Speed Train Scoping Study investigating high-speed rail for Australia.

Between 2005 and 2010, Quinlivan was a deputy secretary in the Department of Agriculture, Fisheries and Forestry.

From 2011 to 2012, Quinlivan was a deputy secretary in the Department of Broadband, Communications and the Digital Economy. In the role, he was head of the Infrastructure group, working to progress Australian communication infrastructure, including the implementation of the National Broadband Network.

In 2012, Quinlivan joined the Productivity Commission as head of office.

Quinlivan was appointed Secretary of the Department of Agriculture in June 2015, responsible for Australian agricultural, food and fibre industries, and animal and plant health, including quarantine. The name of the department was expended to include Water Resources in September 2015.

Quinlivan was appointed an Officer of the Order of Australia in the 2021 Australia Day Honours.

Government offices
Preceded by Paul Grimes	Secretary of the Department of Agriculture; 2015	Succeeded by Himself as Secretary of the Department of Agriculture and Water Resources
Preceded by Himself as Secretary of the Department of Agriculture	Secretary of the Department of Agriculture and Water Resources; 2015 – 2019	Succeeded by Himself as Secretary of the Department of Agriculture and Water Resources
Preceded by Himself as Secretary of the Department of Agriculture and Water Resources	Secretary of the Department of Agriculture; 2019	Incumbent
