= Minister for Agriculture, Fisheries and Forestry =

Australian cabinet position

- Commonwealth Coat of Arms

- Flag of Australia

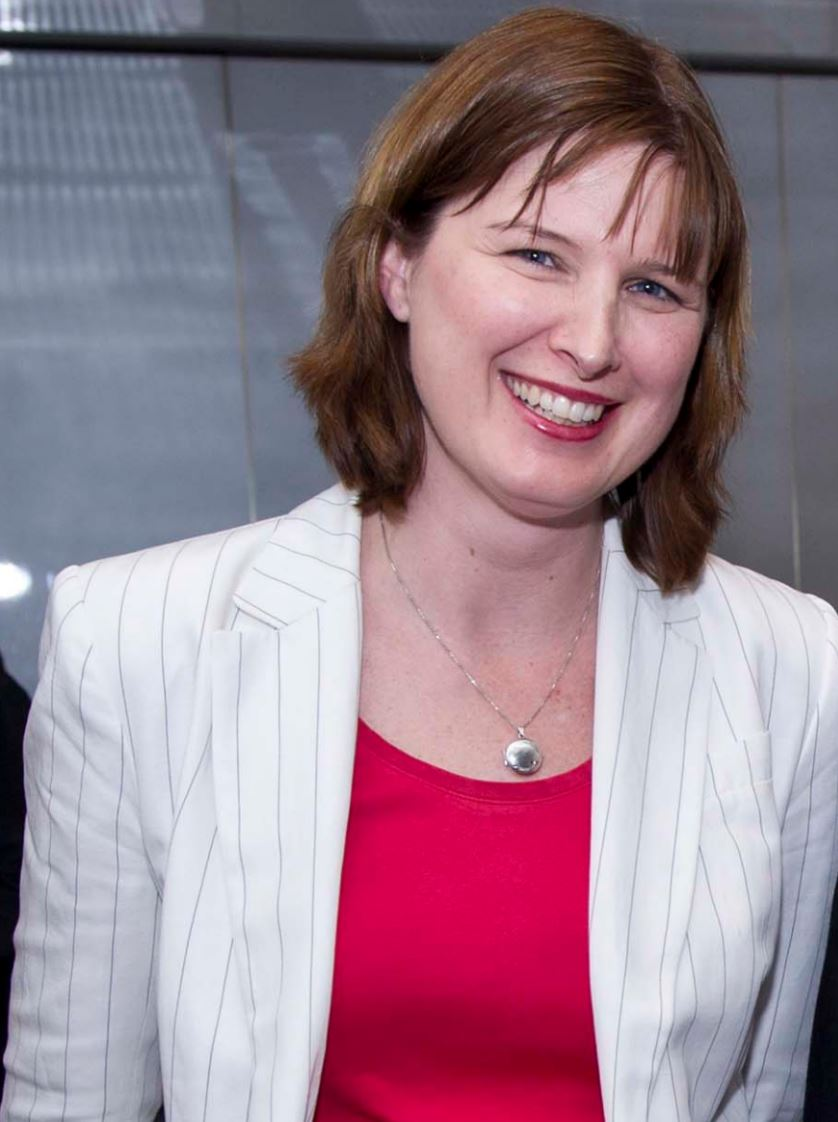
- Incumbent; Julie Collins since 29 July 2024
- Department of Agriculture, Fisheries and Forestry
- Style: The Honourable
- Appointer: Governor-General on the recommendation of the Prime Minister of Australia
- Inaugural holder: Victor Wilson (as the Minister for Markets and Migration)
- Formation: 16 January 1925
- Website: minister.agriculture.gov.au/collins

The Minister for Agriculture, Fisheries and Forestry is an Australian Government cabinet position which is currently held by Julie Collins since July 2024 in the Albanese ministry.

In the Government of Australia, the minister administers this portfolio through the Department of Agriculture, Fisheries and Forestry.

== Portfolio responsibilities ==
In addition to the Department of Agriculture, Water and the Environment, component bodies responsible to the minister include:

- Australian Bureau of Agricultural and Resource Economics
- Biosecurity Australia
- Bureau of Rural Sciences

Other bodies within the portfolio are:

- Australian Egg Corporation
- Australian Fisheries Management Authority
- Australian Landcare Council
- Australian Livestock Export Corporation Limited
- Australian Pesticides and Veterinary Medicines Authority (formerly National Registration Authority for Agricultural and Veterinary Chemicals)
- Australian Pork Limited
- Australian Wine and Brandy Corporation
- Australian Wool Innovation Limited
- Cotton Research and Development Corporation
- Dairy Adjustment Authority
- Dairy Australia
- Fisheries Research and Development Corporation
- Forest and Wood Products Research and Development Corporation
- Grains Research and Development Corporation
- Horticulture Australia Limited
- Meat and Livestock Australia
- Murray-Darling Basin Ministerial Council
- National Consultative Committee on Animal Welfare
- National Land and Water Resources Audit
- National Rural Advisory Council
- Natural Resource Management Ministerial Council
- Northern Territory Fisheries Joint Authority
- Plant Breeder's Rights Office
- Quarantine and Exports Advisory Council
- Primary Industries Ministerial Council
- Queensland Fisheries Joint Authority
- Rural Industries Research and Development Corporation
- Statutory Fishing Rights Allocation Review Panel
- Sugar Research and Development Corporation
- Torres Strait Protected Zone Joint Authority
- Western Australian Fisheries Joint Authority

== List of agriculture ministers ==
The following individuals have been appointed as Minister for Agriculture, or any of its precedent titles:

Order	Minister	Party	Prime Minister	Title	Term start	Term end	Term in office
1	Victor Wilson	Nationalist	Bruce	Minister for Markets and Migration	16 January 1925	18 June 1926	1 year, 153 days
2	Thomas Paterson	Country	Bruce	Minister for Markets and Migration	18 June 1926	19 January 1928	3 years, 126 days
2	Thomas Paterson	Country	Bruce	Minister for Markets	19 January 1928	10 December 1928	3 years, 126 days
2	Thomas Paterson	Country	Bruce	Minister for Markets and Transport	10 December 1928	22 October 1929	3 years, 126 days
3	Parker Moloney	Labor	Scullin	Minister for Markets and Transport	22 October 1929	21 April 1930	2 years, 76 days
3	Parker Moloney	Labor	Scullin	Minister for Markets	21 April 1930	6 January 1932	2 years, 76 days
4	Charles Hawker	United Australia	Lyons	Minister for Markets	6 January 1932	13 April 1932	261 days
4	Charles Hawker	United Australia	Lyons	Minister for Commerce	13 April 1932	23 September 1932	261 days
5	Joseph Lyons	United Australia	Lyons	Minister for Commerce	3 October 1932	13 October 1932	10 days
6	Frederick Stewart	United Australia	Lyons	Minister for Commerce	13 October 1932	9 November 1934	757 days
7	Earle Page	Country	Lyons	Minister for Commerce	9 November 1934	7 April 1939	4 years, 149 days
7	Earle Page	Country	Page	Minister for Commerce	7 April 1939	26 April 1939	4 years, 149 days
8	George McLeay	United Australia	Menzies	Minister for Commerce	26 April 1939	14 March 1940	323 days
9	Archie Cameron	Country	Menzies	Minister for Commerce	14 March 1940	28 October 1940	228 days
n/a	Earle Page	Country	Menzies	Minister for Commerce	28 October 1940	29 August 1941	344 days
n/a	Earle Page	Country	Fadden	Minister for Commerce	29 August 1941	7 October 1941	344 days
10	William Scully	Labor	Curtin	Minister for Commerce	7 October 1941	22 December 1942	5 years, 25 days
10	William Scully	Labor	Curtin	Minister for Commerce and Agriculture	22 December 1942	6 July 1945	5 years, 25 days
10	William Scully	Labor	Forde	Minister for Commerce and Agriculture	6 July 1945	13 July 1945	5 years, 25 days
10	William Scully	Labor	Chifley	Minister for Commerce and Agriculture	13 July 1945	1 November 1946	5 years, 25 days
11	Reg Pollard	Labor	Chifley	Minister for Commerce and Agriculture	1 November 1946	19 December 1949	3 years, 48 days
12	John McEwen	Country	Menzies	Minister for Commerce and Agriculture	19 December 1949	11 January 1956	6 years, 23 days
13	William McMahon	Liberal	Menzies	Minister for Primary Industry	11 January 1956	10 December 1958	2 years, 333 days
14	Charles Adermann	Country	Menzies	Minister for Primary Industry	10 December 1958	26 January 1966	8 years, 310 days
14	Charles Adermann	Country	Holt	Minister for Primary Industry	26 January 1966	16 October 1967	8 years, 310 days
15	Doug Anthony	Country	Holt	Minister for Primary Industry	16 October 1967	19 December 1967	3 years, 112 days
15	Doug Anthony	Country	McEwen	Minister for Primary Industry	19 December 1967	10 January 1968	3 years, 112 days
15	Doug Anthony	Country	Gorton	Minister for Primary Industry	10 January 1968	5 February 1971	3 years, 112 days
16	Ian Sinclair	Country	Gorton	Minister for Primary Industry	5 February 1971	10 March 1971	1 year, 304 days
16	Ian Sinclair	Country	McMahon	Minister for Primary Industry	10 March 1971	5 December 1972	1 year, 304 days
17	Lance Barnard^{1}	Labor	Whitlam	Minister for Primary Industry	5 December 1972	19 December 1972	14 days
18	Ken Wriedt	Labor	Whitlam	Minister for Primary Industry	19 December 1972	12 June 1974	2 years, 306 days
18	Ken Wriedt	Labor	Whitlam	Minister for Agriculture	12 June 1974	21 October 1975	2 years, 306 days
19	Rex Patterson	Labor	Whitlam	Minister for Agriculture	21 October 1975	11 November 1975	21 days
n/a	Ian Sinclair	National Country	Fraser	Minister for Agriculture	11 November 1975	22 December 1975	3 years, 320 days
n/a	Ian Sinclair	National Country	Fraser	Minister for Primary Industry	22 December 1975	27 September 1979	3 years, 320 days
20	Peter Nixon	National Country	Fraser	Minister for Primary Industry	27 September 1979	16 October 1982	3 years, 165 days
20	Peter Nixon	National	Fraser	Minister for Primary Industry	16 October 1982	11 March 1983	3 years, 165 days
21	John Kerin	Labor	Hawke	Minister for Primary Industry	11 March 1983	24 July 1987	8 years, 85 days
21	John Kerin	Labor	Hawke	Minister for Primary Industries and Energy	24 July 1987	4 June 1991	8 years, 85 days
22	Simon Crean	Labor	Hawke	Minister for Primary Industries and Energy	4 June 1991	20 December 1991	2 years, 202 days
22	Simon Crean	Labor	Keating	Minister for Primary Industries and Energy	20 December 1991	23 December 1993	2 years, 202 days
23	Bob Collins	Labor	Keating	Minister for Primary Industries and Energy	23 December 1993	11 March 1996	2 years, 79 days
24	John Anderson	National	Howard	Minister for Primary Industries and Energy	11 March 1996	21 October 1998	2 years, 224 days
25	Mark Vaile	National	Howard	Minister for Agriculture, Fisheries and Forestry	21 October 1998	20 July 1999	272 days
26	Warren Truss	National	Howard	Minister for Agriculture, Fisheries and Forestry	20 July 1999	6 July 2005	5 years, 351 days
27	Peter McGauran	National	Howard	Minister for Agriculture, Fisheries and Forestry	6 July 2005	3 December 2007	2 years, 150 days
28	Tony Burke	Labor	Rudd	Minister for Agriculture, Fisheries and Forestry	3 December 2007	28 June 2010	2 years, 285 days
28	Tony Burke	Labor	Gillard	Minister for Agriculture, Fisheries and Forestry	28 June 2010	14 September 2010	2 years, 285 days
29	Joe Ludwig	Labor	Gillard	Minister for Agriculture, Fisheries and Forestry	14 September 2010	1 July 2013	2 years, 290 days
30	Joel Fitzgibbon	Labor	Rudd	Minister for Agriculture, Fisheries and Forestry	1 July 2013	18 September 2013	79 days
31	Barnaby Joyce	National	Abbott	Minister for Agriculture	18 September 2013	15 September 2015	4 years, 39 days
31	Barnaby Joyce	National	Turnbull	Minister for Agriculture	15 September 2015	21 September 2015	4 years, 39 days
31	Barnaby Joyce	National	Turnbull	Minister for Agriculture and Water Resources	21 September 2015	27 October 2017	4 years, 39 days
32	Malcolm Turnbull	Liberal	Turnbull	Minister for Agriculture and Water Resources	27 October 2017	6 December 2017	40 days
(31)	Barnaby Joyce	National	Turnbull	Minister for Agriculture and Water Resources	6 December 2017	20 December 2017	14 days
33	David Littleproud	National	Turnbull	Minister for Agriculture and Water Resources	20 December 2017	28 August 2018	1 year, 160 days
33	David Littleproud	National	Morrison	Minister for Agriculture and Water Resources	28 August 2018	29 May 2019	1 year, 160 days
34	Bridget McKenzie	National	Morrison	Minister for Agriculture	29 May 2019	2 February 2020	249 days
	Michael McCormack (acting)	National	Morrison	Minister for Agriculture	2 February 2020	6 February 2020	4 days
(33)	David Littleproud	National	Morrison	Minister for Agriculture, Drought and Emergency Management	6 February 2020	2 July 2021	2 years, 106 days
(33)	David Littleproud	National	Morrison	Minister for Agriculture and Northern Australia	2 July 2021	23 May 2022	2 years, 106 days
35	Murray Watt	Labor	Albanese	Minister for Agriculture, Fisheries and Forestry	1 June 2022	29 July 2024	2 years, 58 days
36	Julie Collins	Labor	Albanese	Minister for Agriculture, Fisheries and Forestry	29 July 2024	incumbent	2 years, 40 days

Notes

^{1} Barnard was part of a two-man ministry comprising Barnard and Gough Whitlam for fourteen days until the full ministry was commissioned.

== List of fisheries and forestry ministers ==
The following individuals have been appointed as junior ministers in the agriculture portfolio or any of its precedent titles.

Order	Minister	Party	Prime Minister	Title	Term start	Term end	Term in office
1	Wilson Tuckey	Liberal	Howard	Minister for Forestry and Conservation	21 October 1998	26 November 2001	3 years, 36 days
2	Ian Macdonald	Liberal	Howard	Minister for Forestry and Conservation	26 November 2001	14 November 2002	4 years, 62 days
2	Ian Macdonald	Liberal	Howard	Minister for Fisheries, Forestry and Conservation	14 November 2002	27 January 2006	4 years, 62 days
3	Eric Abetz	Liberal	Howard	Minister for Fisheries, Forestry and Conservation	27 January 2006	3 December 2007	1 year, 310 days
4	Tony Burke	Labor	Rudd	Minister for Agriculture, Fisheries and Forestry	3 December 2007	28 June 2010	2 years, 285 days
4	Tony Burke	Labor	Gillard	Minister for Agriculture, Fisheries and Forestry	28 June 2010	14 September 2010	2 years, 285 days
5	Joe Ludwig	Labor	Gillard	Minister for Agriculture, Fisheries and Forestry	14 September 2010	1 July 2013	2 years, 290 days
6	Joel Fitzgibbon	Labor	Rudd	Minister for Agriculture, Fisheries and Forestry	1 July 2013	18 September 2013	79 days
7	Murray Watt	Labor	Albanese	Minister for Agriculture, Fisheries and Forestry	1 June 2022	29 July 2024	2 years, 58 days
8	Julie Collins	Labor	Albanese	Minister for Agriculture, Fisheries and Forestry	29 July 2024	incumbent	2 years, 40 days

== List of assistant ministers ==
The following individuals have been appointed as assistant ministers in the agriculture portfolio or any of its precedent titles.

Order	Minister	Party	Prime Minister	Title	Term start	Term end	Term in office
1	Richard Colbeck	Liberal	Howard	Parliamentary Secretary to the Minister for Agriculture, Fisheries and Forestry	26 October 2004	27 January 2006	1 year, 93 days
2	Sussan Ley	Liberal	Howard	Parliamentary Secretary to the Minister for Agriculture, Fisheries and Forestry	27 January 2006	3 December 2007	1 year, 310 days
3	Mike Kelly	Labor	Gillard	Parliamentary Secretary to the Minister for Agriculture, Fisheries and Forestry	14 September 2010	14 December 2011	1 year, 91 days
4	Sid Sidebottom	Labor	Gillard	Parliamentary Secretary to the Minister for Agriculture, Fisheries and Forestry	14 December 2011	27 June 2013	1 year, 278 days
4	Sid Sidebottom	Labor	Rudd	Parliamentary Secretary to the Minister for Agriculture, Fisheries and Forestry	27 June 2013	18 September 2013	1 year, 278 days
(1)	Richard Colbeck	Liberal	Abbott	Parliamentary Secretary to the Minister for Agriculture	18 September 2013	21 September 2015	2 years, 3 days
5	Anne Ruston	Liberal	Turnbull	Assistant Minister for Agriculture and Water Resources	21 September 2015	28 August 2018	2 years, 341 days
(1)	Richard Colbeck	Liberal	Morrison	Assistant Minister for Agriculture and Water Resources	28 August 2018	29 May 2019	274 days
6	Jonathon Duniam	Liberal	Morrison	Assistant Minister for Forestry and Fisheries	29 May 2019	23 May 2022	2 years, 359 days
7	Anthony Chisholm	Labor	Albanese	Assistant Minister for Agriculture, Fisheries and Forestry	29 July 2024	incumbent	2 years, 40 days

== See also ==
- Minister for Agriculture (Victoria)
