= Department of Agriculture (Australia, 2019–20) =

Short-lived agency of the Australian government

Department overview
- Formed: 29 May 2019
- Preceding Department: Department of Agriculture & Water Resources
- Dissolved: 1 February 2020
- Superseding Department: Department of Agriculture, Water and the Environment
- Jurisdiction: Australia
- Ministers responsible: David Littleproud, Minister for Water Resources; Bridget McKenzie, Minister for Agriculture; Richard Colbeck, Assistant Minister for Agriculture and Water Resources
- Department executive: Daryl Quinlivan, Secretary (2019–2020)
- Child agencies: Australian Bureau of Agricultural and Resources Economics and Sciences; Australian Fisheries Management Authority; Agricultural Minister's Forum; Agricultural Industry Advisory Council; Agricultural Senior Officials Committee; Australian Grape and Wine Authority; Australian Pesticides and Veterinary Medicines Authority; Cotton Research and Development Corporation; Fisheries Research and Development Corporation; Forest and Wood Products Council; Grains Research and Development Corporation; Indonesia-Australian Partnership on Food Security in the Red Meat and Cattle Sector; Murray-Darling Basin Authority; National Landcare Advisory Committee; National Rural Advisory Council; Rural Industries Research and Development Corporation
- Website: Official website

The Australian Department of Agriculture was an Australian Government department in existence between May 2019 and February 2020, which was responsible for developing and implementing policies and programmes that contribute to strengthening Australia's primary industries, delivering better returns for primary producers at the farm gate, protecting Australia from animal and plant pests and diseases, and improving the health of Australia's rivers and freshwater ecosystems.

Following the appointment of the Second Morrison Ministry in May 2019, Scott Morrison announced David Littleproud's previous ministerial positions were separated, with Bridget McKenzie as Minister for Agriculture and Littleproud as Minister for Water Resources.

The Secretary of the Department of Agriculture and Water Resources, Daryl Quinlivan, was responsible to the Minister for Agriculture, Bridget McKenzie and Minister for Water Resources, the Hon David Littleproud MP. The Assistant Minister for Agriculture and Water Resources is Senator the Hon Richard Colbeck since August 2018. The Assistant Minister to the former Deputy Prime Minister Barnaby Joyce is the Hon Luke Hartsuyker MP.

By an administrative order issued on 5 December 2019 and effective from 1 February 2020, the department all functions of the department were merged with the environment functions of the Department of the Environment and Energy, to form the Department of Agriculture, Water and the Environment. Secretary Daryl Quinlivan was sacked as a result of the merger.

== Overview ==
The Department of Agriculture and Water Resources' vision was to help drive a stronger Australian economy by building a more profitable, more resilient and more sustainable agriculture sector, and by supporting the sustainable and productive management and use of rivers and water resources.

The department's annual reports provided information about its operations and performances in each financial year, and reviews its progress towards its objectives.

The department's Corporate Plan set outs the department's eight strategic objectives. Those identified in the 2016–17 plan included:

- building successful primary industries
- supporting agricultural communities
- expanding agricultural, fisheries and forestry exports
- sustaining natural resources for longer-term productive primary industries
- improving water use efficiency and the health of rivers, communities, environmental assets and production systems
- managing biosecurity and imported food risk
- building an efficient and capable department
- being a best practice regulator.

The department strove to build strong relationships and work with governments, industry, importers and exporters, natural resource managers, primary producers, consumers, research and development organisations, rural communities and travellers.

The department employed approximately 4000 full-time equivalent staff, including accountants, animal and meat inspectors, biosecurity officers, economists, information and communication technology (ICT) staff, policy officers, program administrators, researchers, scientists, survey staff and veterinary officers.

The corporate structure was organised into divisions to support work across a broad range of agricultural, biosecurity, fisheries and forestry and water management activities.

The department was located in regional centres, rural communities and cities throughout Australia. Around 58 per cent of its Australian-based employees worked outside Canberra, in capital cities and regional offices, major airports, mail centres, shipping ports, laboratories and abattoirs.

Globally, the department operated in Bangkok, Beijing, Brussels, Dubai, Jakarta, New Delhi, Rome, Seoul, Tokyo and Washington, to maintain relationships with Australia's trading partners and international organisations.

== History ==
The department was formed by way of an administrative order issued on 29 May 2019, replacing the previous Department of Agriculture & Water Resources, following the re-election of Scott Morrison as Prime Minister of Australia.

=== Preceding departments ===
- Department of Markets and Migration (16 January 1925 – 19 January 1928)
- Department of Markets (19 January 1928 – 10 December 1928)
- Department of Markets and Transport (10 December 1928 – 21 April 1930)
- Department of Markets (21 April 1930 – 13 April 1932)
- Department of Commerce (13 April 1932 – 22 December 1942)
- Department of Commerce and Agriculture (22 December 1942 – 11 January 1956)
- Department of Primary Industry (11 January 1956 – 2 June 1974)
- Department of Agriculture (12 June 1974 – 22 December 1975)
- Department of Primary Industry (22 December 1975 – 24 July 1987)
- Department of Primary Industries and Energy (24 July 1987 – 21 October 1998)
- Department of Agriculture, Fisheries and Forestry (21 October 1998 – 18 September 2013)
- Department of Agriculture (18 September 2013 – 21 September 2015)
- Department of Agriculture and Water Resources (21 September 2015 – 29 May 2019)

== Operational activities ==
The department provided specialised policy advice to the Australian Government and delivers a range of policies and programs to:

- provide evidence-based support for government and industry decision-making
- help primary producers to gain and maintain access to overseas markets, including administration of export quotas
- support primary producers and rural communities to be productive and sustainable through grants and other funding support, including drought assistance for farm families and businesses
- manage Commonwealth fisheries in consultation and develop national approaches to sustainable management of the fishing industry
- represent Australia’s interests overseas to promote responsible fishing practices and to combat illegal fishing.
- foster and enable productive, profitable, internationally competitive and sustainable Australian forest and forest products industries
- help primary industries and producers to adapt and respond to climate change
- achieve social, economic and environmental benefits through water policy and resource management.

The department took a risk-based approach to safeguarding Australia against animal and plant pests and diseases and helps importers and exporters to meet regulatory requirements by:

- assessing and inspecting imported animal and plant products and machinery for diseases, pests and weeds
- setting conditions for imported animal and plant products
- issuing import and export permits and undertaking certification of goods
- ensuring compliance through audit, investigation and assurance activities
- accrediting third parties to undertake activities on its behalf
- reforming regulation and bureaucracy

The department managed, coordinated and prepared for response actions to national priority pests, diseases and weeds, including:

- appropriately trained personnel, procedures and practices
- preparation to act rapidly in response to an outbreak
- plans and coordinated response activities with other jurisdictions and industries
- preparation to manage a specific incident or offshore incursion.

The department’s work was grounded in research and science, providing information and analysis on agriculture, fisheries and forestry industries, including:

- commodity forecasts
- economic analysis and modelling
- data and statistics on issues affecting Australian farmers and rural communities
- biophysical science for biosecurity risk assessment, forecasting and diagnostics.

The department collected and audited primary industry levies for marketing, research and development, animal and plant health, residue testing and emergency response.

The department worked in partnership and collaboration with its clients, stakeholders, governments and the community by engaging with those who had a vested interest in the way it dud business. This engagement consisted of:

- public consultations on policy, program and operational proposals
- industry forums
- international delegations and international forums
- work with Aboriginal and Torres Strait Islander communities through the Northern Australia Quarantine Strategy.

== See also ==
- Australian Bureau of Agricultural and Resource Economics
- Australian Fisheries Management Authority
- List of Australian Commonwealth Government entities
- Minister for Agriculture and Water Resources
- Murray-Darling Basin Authority
