= Paul Grimes (public servant) =

Australian public servant

Paul Grimes PSM

28th Secretary of the NSW Treasury
- In office 29 January 2022 – 14 April 2023

Secretary of the Department of Agriculture
- In office 18 September 2013 – March 2015

Secretary of the Department of Sustainability, Environment, Water, Population and Communities
- In office June 2011 – 18 September 2013

Personal details
- Born: Paul Francis Grimes
- Education: Flinders University; Australian National University
- Occupation: Public servant

Paul Francis Grimes PSM is a senior Australian public servant. Between September 2013 and March 2015, he was Secretary of the Australian Government Department of Agriculture.

== Life and career ==
Grimes received a Bachelor of Economics from Flinders University in 1989, later completing a Masters of Economics and a PhD in Economics at the Australian National University. His PhD thesis, which he completed in 1994, was titled The Determinants of Trade Union Membership: Evidence from Two Australian Surveys. He finished his secondary education at the Armand Hammer United World College of the American West in 1984.

In the South Australian public service, Grimes obtained the role of Deputy Under Secretary in the Department of Treasury and Finance.

Between March 2005 and January 2007, Grimes was ACT Under Treasurer in the ACT Public Service. In the role he oversaw the ACT Government's transition to the GFS accounting system, a change that then Treasurer Jon Stanhope suggested would enable the Government to have a more realistic and less volatile basis upon which to base budgeting decisions. He also assisted in developing and delivering the 2006–07 ACT Government Budget, which involved major structural change to ACT Government agencies; and consolidated IT and procurement services across the ACT public service.

In January 2007, Grimes took up an Australian Public Service position as Deputy Secretary in the Department of Finance and Administration. He stayed in the Department when it transitioned to become the Department of Finance and Deregulation, heading the Budget Group as its General Manager.

Grimes was appointed Acting Secretary of the Department of Sustainability, Environment, Water, Population and Communities in September 2010, moving into the role formally in 2011. His responsibilities at the Department included matters related to environment protection and conservation of biodiversity, air quality, national fuel quality standards and administration of the Australian Antarctic Territory.

In September 2013, after the Abbott government was sworn in, Grimes was transferred to head the Department of Agriculture. In the role, Grimes was responsible for matters including the agricultural, pastoral, fishing, food and forest industries, rural adjustment and drought issues, food security policy and programs, and quarantine.

In March 2015, Agriculture Minister Barnaby Joyce announced Grimes would be stepping down from his Secretary position, with media reporting that Joyce and Grimes were understood to have different philosophical views on environmental issues. Grimes reportedly wrote that he "agreed that the minister would be better supported... by a new secretary with a different background and set of policy skills."

Grimes was appointed Commissioner of the Victorian Public Sector Commission in December 2017. His term begins on 22 January 2018. He left the role in January 2020 in order to be closer to his family in Canberra.

In April 2020, Grimes was appointed by the New South Wales Department of Planning, Industry and Environment to the role of Coordinator General Environment, Energy and Science, commencing on 6 April 2020. In the role, he worked with the state Minister for Energy and Environment Matt Kean. In January 2022, Grimes was appointed by Kean, who had become state Treasurer in October 2021, to be the 28th Secretary of the NSW Treasury, beginning on 29 January 2022. Grimes was sacked by the new Labor state government on 14 April 2023.

== Awards ==
In June 2010, Grimes was awarded a Public Service Medal for outstanding public service in the development of the Australian Government's response to the 2008 financial crisis.

Government offices
Preceded by Robyn Kruk	Secretary of the Department of Sustainability, Environment, Water, Population and Communities; 2011–2013	Succeeded by Gordon de Brouwer as Secretary of the Department of the Environment
Preceded by Andrew Metcalfe as Secretary of the Department of Agriculture, Fisheries and Forestry	Secretary of the Department of Agriculture; 2013–2015	Succeeded by Daryl Quinlivan
