= Grains Research and Development Corporation =

Australian government agency

Department overview
- Jurisdiction: Commonwealth of Australia
- Parent Department: Department of Agriculture, Fisheries and Forestry
- Website: Official website

Grains Research and Development Corporation (GRDC) is an Australian research statutory corporation founded in October 1990 under the Primary Industries and Energy Research and Development Act, 1989 (PIERD Act). It invests in projects and partnerships to drive profitability and productivity in Australia's grains industry. It is funded by the Australian government and a levy on graingrowers, which is determined by the industry's peak bodies Grains Producers Australia (GPA) and Graingrowers Ltd (GGL). The Department of Agriculture is the relevant government department.
