= Department of Agriculture and Water Resources =

Former agriculture ministry of Australia

Department overview
- Formed: 21 September 2015
- Preceding Department: Department of Agriculture
- Dissolved: 29 May 2019
- Superseding Department: Department of Agriculture
- Jurisdiction: Australia
- Minister responsible: David Littleproud, Minister for Agriculture and Water Resources; Richard Colbeck, Assistant Minister for Agriculture and Water Resources
- Department executive: Daryl Quinlivan, Secretary (2015–2019)
- Child agencies: Australian Bureau of Agricultural and Resources Economics and Sciences; Australian Fisheries Management Authority; Agricultural Minister's Forum; Agricultural Industry Advisory Council; Agricultural Senior Officials Committee; Australian Grape and Wine Authority; Australian Pesticides and Veterinary Medicines Authority; Cotton Research and Development Corporation; Fisheries Research and Development Corporation; Forest and Wood Products Council; Grains Research and Development Corporation; Indonesia-Australian Partnership on Food Security in the Red Meat and Cattle Sector; Murray-Darling Basin Authority; National Landcare Advisory Committee; National Rural Advisory Council; Rural Industries Research and Development Corporation
- Website: Official website

The Australian Government Department of Agriculture and Water Resources was a government department that existed between 2015 and 2019, which was responsible for developing and implementing policies and programs that contribute to strengthening Australia's primary industries, delivering better returns for primary producers at the farm gate, protecting Australia from animal and plant pests and diseases, and improving the health of Australia's rivers and freshwater ecosystems.

The Secretary of the Department of Agriculture and Water Resources, Daryl Quinlivan, was responsible to the Minister for Agriculture and Water Resources, The Hon. David Littleproud MP. The Assistant Minister for Agriculture and Water Resources was Senator the Hon Richard Colbeck since August 2018. The Assistant Minister to the former Deputy Prime Minister Barnaby Joyce was the Hon Luke Hartsuyker MP.

Following the appointment of the Second Morrison Ministry in May 2019, Scott Morrison announced David Littleproud's previous ministerial positions were separated, with Bridget McKenzie as Minister for Agriculture and Littleproud as Minister for Water Resources. The Department again changed to the Department of Agriculture.

== Overview ==
The Department of Agriculture and Water Resources' vision was to help drive a stronger Australian economy by building a more profitable, more resilient and more sustainable agriculture sector, and by supporting the sustainable and productive management and use of rivers and water resources.

The department's annual reports provide information about its operations and performances in each financial year, and reviews its progress towards its objectives.

The department's Corporate Plan sets outs the department's eight strategic objectives. Those identified in the 2016–17 plan include:

- building successful primary industries
- supporting agricultural communities
- expanding agricultural, fisheries and forestry exports
- sustaining natural resources for longer-term productive primary industries
- improving water use efficiency and the health of rivers, communities, environmental assets and production systems
- managing biosecurity and imported food risk
- building an efficient and capable department
- being a best practice regulator.

The department strives to build strong relationships and work with governments, industry, importers and exporters, natural resource managers, primary producers, consumers, research and development organisations, rural communities and travellers.

The department employs approximately 4000 full-time equivalent staff, including accountants, animal and meat inspectors, biosecurity officers, economists, information and communication technology (ICT) staff, policy officers, program administrators, researchers, scientists, survey staff and veterinary officers.

The corporate structure is organised into divisions to support work across a broad range of agricultural, biosecurity, fisheries and forestry and water management activities.

The department is located in regional centres, rural communities and cities throughout Australia. Around 58 per cent of its Australian-based employees work outside Canberra, in capital cities and regional offices, major airports, mail centres, shipping ports, laboratories and abattoirs.

Globally, the department works in Bangkok, Beijing, Brussels, Dubai, Jakarta, New Delhi, Rome, Seoul, Tokyo and Washington, to maintain relationships with Australia's trading partners and international organisations.

== History ==
The department was formed by way of an administrative order issued on 21 September 2015, replacing the previous Department of Agriculture, following the appointment of Malcolm Turnbull as Prime Minister of Australia.

=== Preceding departments ===
- Department of Markets and Migration (16 January 1925 – 19 January 1928)
- Department of Markets (19 January 1928 – 10 December 1928)
- Department of Markets and Transport (10 December 1928 – 21 April 1930)
- Department of Markets (21 April 1930 – 13 April 1932)
- Department of Commerce (13 April 1932 – 22 December 1942)
- Department of Commerce and Agriculture (22 December 1942 – 11 January 1956)
- Department of Primary Industry (11 January 1956 – 2 June 1974)
- Department of Agriculture (12 June 1974 – 22 December 1975)
- Department of Primary Industry (22 December 1975 – 24 July 1987)
- Department of Primary Industries and Energy (24 July 1987 – 21 October 1998)
- Department of Agriculture, Fisheries and Forestry (21 October 1998 – 18 September 2013)
- Department of Agriculture (18 September 2013 – 21 September 2015)

== Operational activities ==
The department provides specialised policy advice to the Australian Government and delivers a range of policies and programs to:

- provide evidence-based support for government and industry decision-making
- help primary producers to gain and maintain access to overseas markets, including administration of export quotas
- support primary producers and rural communities to be productive and sustainable through grants and other funding support, including drought assistance for farm families and businesses
- manage Commonwealth fisheries in consultation and develop national approaches to sustainable management of the fishing industry
- represent Australia’s interests overseas to promote responsible fishing practices and to combat illegal fishing.
- foster and enable productive, profitable, internationally competitive and sustainable Australian forest and forest products industries
- help primary industries and producers to adapt and respond to climate change
- achieve social, economic and environmental benefits through water policy and resource management.

The department takes a risk-based approach to safeguarding Australia against animal and plant pests and diseases and helps importers and exporters to meet regulatory requirements by:

- assessing and inspecting imported animal and plant products and machinery for diseases, pests and weeds
- setting conditions for imported animal and plant products
- issuing import and export permits and undertaking certification of goods
- ensuring compliance through audit, investigation and assurance activities
- accrediting third parties to undertake activities on its behalf
- reforming regulation and bureaucracy

The department manages, coordinates and prepares for response actions to national priority pests, diseases and weeds, including:

- appropriately trained personnel, procedures and practices
- preparation to act rapidly in response to an outbreak
- plans and coordinated response activities with other jurisdictions and industries
- preparation to manage a specific incident or offshore incursion.

The department’s work is grounded in research and science, providing information and analysis on agriculture, fisheries and forestry industries, including:

- commodity forecasts
- economic analysis and modelling
- data and statistics on issues affecting Australian farmers and rural communities
- biophysical science for biosecurity risk assessment, forecasting and diagnostics.

The department collects and audits primary industry levies for marketing, research and development, animal and plant health, residue testing and emergency response.

The department works in partnership and collaboration with its clients, stakeholders, governments and the community by engaging with those who have a vested interest in the way it does business. This engagement consists of:

- public consultations on policy, program and operational proposals
- industry forums
- international delegations and international forums
- work with Aboriginal and Torres Strait Islander communities through the Northern Australia Quarantine Strategy.

== See also ==
- Australian Bureau of Agricultural and Resource Economics
- Australian Fisheries Management Authority
- List of Australian Commonwealth Government entities
- Minister for Agriculture and Water Resources
- Murray-Darling Basin Authority
