= Department of Agriculture (Australia, 2013–2015) =

Former agriculture ministry of Australia (2013–2015)

Department overview
- Formed: 18 September 2013
- Preceding Department: Department of Agriculture, Fisheries and Forestry
- Dissolved: 21 September 2015
- Superseding Department: Department of Agriculture and Water Resources
- Jurisdiction: Australia
- Employees: 4,644 (at June 2014)
- Ministers responsible: Barnaby Joyce, Minister for Agriculture; Richard Colbeck, Parliamentary Secretary to the Minister for Agriculture
- Department executives: Daryl Quinlivan, Secretary (2015); Paul Grimes, Secretary (2013–2015)
- Website: Official website

The Australian Government Department of Agriculture was a federal government department charged with the responsibility to develop and implement policies and programs that ensure Australia's agricultural, fisheries, food and forestry industries remain competitive, profitable and sustainable.

The head of the department was the Secretary of the Department of Agriculture, initially Paul Grimes (until March 2015) and then Daryl Quinlivan. The Secretary was responsible to the Minister for Agriculture, the Hon. Barnaby Joyce MP.

== Overview ==
Department of Agriculture policies and programs:

- encourage and support sustainable natural resource use and management
- protect the health and safety of plant and animal industries
- enable industries to adapt to compete in a fast-changing international and economic environment
- help improve market access and market performance for the agricultural and food sector
- encourage and assist industries to adopt new technology and practices
- assist primary producers and the food industry to develop business and marketing skills, and to be financially self-reliant.

== History ==
The department was formed by way of an administrative order issued on 18 September 2013 and replaced the functions previously performed by the Department of Agriculture, Fisheries and Forestry.

=== Preceding departments ===
- Department of Markets and Migration (16 January 1925 – 19 January 1928)
- Department of Markets (19 January 1928 – 10 December 1928)
- Department of Markets and Transport (10 December 1928 – 21 April 1930)
- Department of Markets (21 April 1930 – 13 April 1932)
- Department of Commerce (13 April 1932 – 22 December 1942)
- Department of Commerce and Agriculture (22 December 1942 – 11 January 1956)
- Department of Primary Industry (11 January 1956 – 2 June 1974)
- Department of Agriculture (12 June 1974 – 22 December 1975)
- Department of Primary Industry (22 December 1975 – 24 July 1987)
- Department of Primary Industries and Energy (24 July 1987 – 21 October 1998)
- Department of Agriculture, Fisheries and Forestry (21 October 1998 – 18 September 2013)

=== Subsequent departments ===
- Department of Agriculture and Water Resources (21 September 2015 – 29 May 2019)

== Operational activities ==
The department facilitated the development of self-reliant, profitable, competitive and sustainable Australian farm businesses and industries. Through consultation with industry, the department develops and implements policies and programs that help to assure product safety and integrity. Particular emphasis is placed on on-farm risk management that relates to food safety.
