= Bureau of Rural Sciences =

The Bureau of Rural Sciences (BRS) is a scientific agency within the Australian Department of Agriculture, Fisheries and Forestry. The BRS was merged with the Australian Bureau of Agricultural and Resource Economics (ABARE) in 2010, 24 years after its creation in 1986.

The BRS provides scientific advice to the Australian Government in support of more profitable, competitive and sustainable use of Australia's natural resources. The BRS is regarded as an important interface between science, agricultural and rural affairs and government policy.
