= Fisheries Research and Development Corporation =

Australian government organisation

Coordinates: 35.3168°S 149.0966°E

Agency overview
- Formed: 1991
- Jurisdiction: Commonwealth of Australia
- Headquarters: Canberra, Australian Capital Territory, Australia
- Employees: 24
- Agency executive: Sean Sloan, Managing director
- Parent agency: Department of Agriculture, Fisheries and Forestry
- Website: www.frdc.com.au

The Fisheries Research and Development Corporation (FRDC) is a statutory corporation that manages research and development investment by the Australian Government and the Australian fishing and aquaculture commercial, recreational and Indigenous sectors.

== Business model ==
The FRDC is one of fifteen Australian Rural Research and Development Corporations (RDCs) managing investment by the Australian Government and primary industries that during the past 25 years has been crucial to the doubling of the productivity of the agriculture, fisheries and forestry sectors. It is one of five RDCs which are statutory corporations, along with AgriFutures Australia, Wine Australia, the Cotton Research and Development Corporation, and the Grain Research and Development Corporation

At its inception in 1992, the corporation's major focus was on research concerning the management of commercial wild-catch fisheries and, to a lesser extent, aquaculture. Since then, the scope has widened greatly to encompass economic, environmental and social aspects of the entire fishing and aquaculture commercial, recreational and indigenous sectors – that is, the recreational and indigenous customary sectors in addition to the commercial wild-catch and aquaculture sectors. The corporation's strategic investments in research, development and extension activities benefit all its stakeholders (listed below). However, the FRDC is unique among the corporations in balancing its investment between natural resource management and industry productivity and development. Therefore, a significant proportion of funding is directed at research that has a public good benefit.

== Governance ==
Formed as a statutory corporation on 2 July 1991 under the provisions of the Primary Industries and Research and Development Act 1989 (the PIRD Act), the FRDC is responsible to the Minister for Agriculture, Drought and Emergency Management (Australia).

A Chairman and a board of directors govern the FRDC; the executive director leads the corporation's business activities on a day-to-day basis. The board oversees corporate governance, sets strategic direction and monitors the ongoing performance of the corporation and the executive director.

The Board's authority to govern the FRDC is granted under the PIRD Act. The direction and control of the FRDC, including its business and affairs, is vested in the Board as a whole. The objectives of the Board are to add value by ensuring that appropriate governance is in place by:

- setting the strategic direction of the organisation.
- developing policy to help implement this direction.
- monitoring and supervising systems that deliver the results of the organisation
- ensuring accountability (including engaging with, and reporting to, stakeholders)
- ensuring legal compliance

The Board meets a minimum of five times annually, not including special meetings. During the year the Board will visit various locations as part of Board meetings, to meet industry, management agencies, research providers and other stakeholders providing an opportunity to inform the FRDC of its R&D needs.

== Investment ==
=== Revenue sources ===
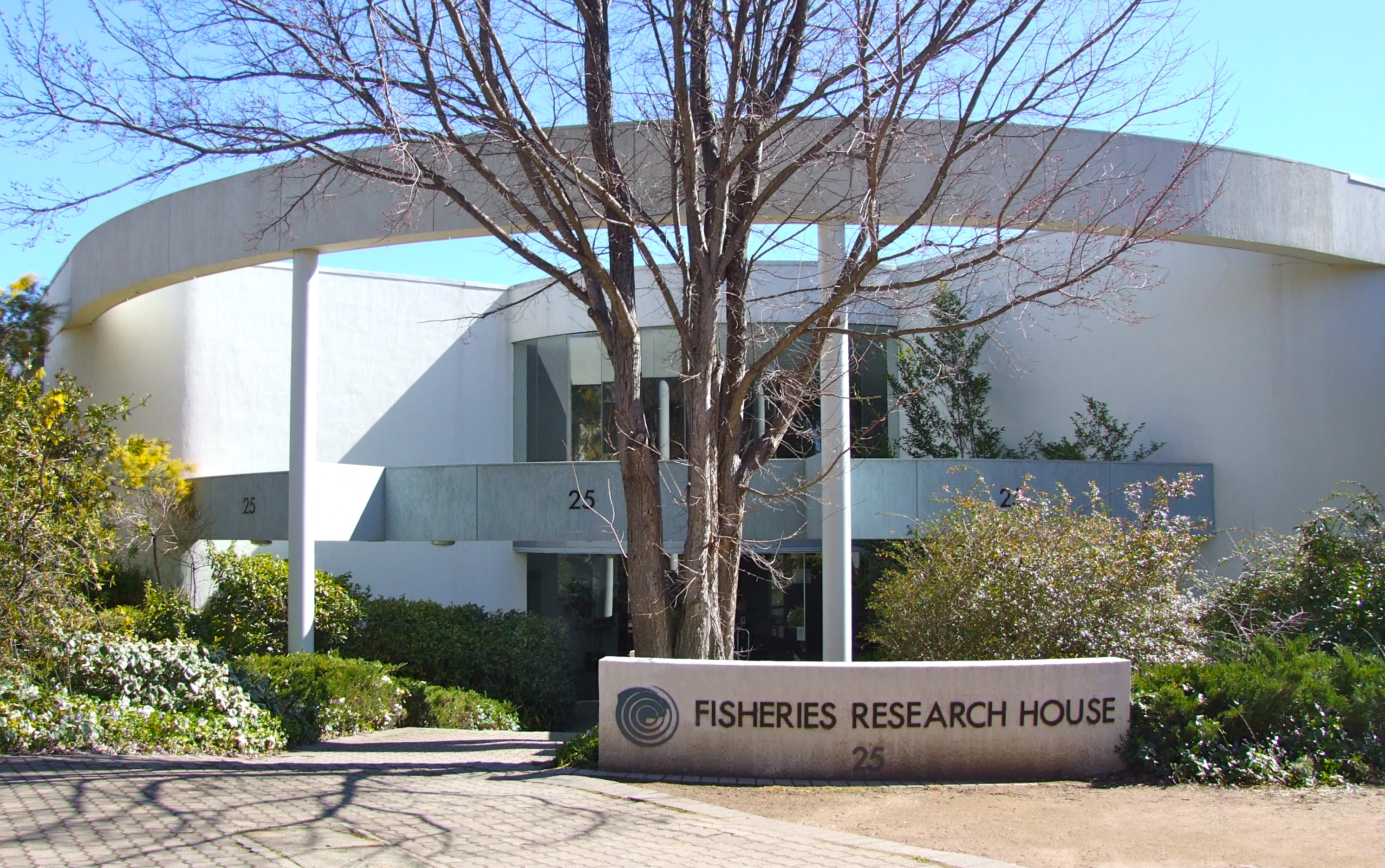
Entrance to Fisheries Research and Development Corporation, Canberra, Australia

The primary revenue for the FRDC comes from the Australian Government and the fishing and aquaculture commercial, recreational and indigenous sectors, based on:

- the Australian Government providing unmatched funds equivalent to 0.5 per cent of the average gross value of Australian fisheries production (AGVP);
- fishers and aquaculturists providing contributions of at least 0.25 per cent of AGVP; and
- the Australian Government matching contributions by fishers and aquaculturists up to a maximum of 0.25 per cent of AGVP.

The corporation also manages significant contributions by stakeholders in FRDC-funded projects.

The FRDC's strategic investments in RD&E activities benefit the three sectors of fishing: commercial (wild catch and aquaculture), recreational and indigenous customary. The FRDC has a significant responsibility in ensuring, on behalf of the Australian Government, that research is undertaken to assist in the management of the fisheries and aquaculture resource for ongoing sustainability. A significant proportion of funding is therefore directed to research that has a public good benefit.

== Investment strategy ==
The FRDC invests in Research and Development (R&D) that supports all fishing and aquaculture – commercial wild-catch, aquaculture, Indigenous and recreational fishers, the post-harvest sector, and Australian community.

The FRDC investment policy establishes a framework for informing and governing investment decisions. Knowledge generated from partnerships and past research, development and extension (RD&E) activities are considered in the FRDC policy planning and investment processes, to ensure the adoption of previous research, maximise leverage and reduce duplication.

As part of the Statutory Funding Agreement with the Department of Agriculture, Water and Environment the FRDC is required to invest in a diverse range of RD&E activities (balanced investment portfolio approach) that take a risk-based approach and deliver impact on short and longer-term timescales.

The FRDC aims to spread its investment in R&D across the whole value-chain of fishing and aquaculture, as well as address the needs of both Indigenous and recreational fishers. The FRDC remains focussed on investing to address the priorities of stakeholders (jurisdictions and sectors) while addressing challenges that have a national and/or cross sectoral benefit.

The FRDC has agreed to be an inaugural member of the new joint collaborative Research and Development Corporation (RDC) investment vehicle that will establish a pooled investment fund. The purpose of this new investment vehicle is to address national cross-sector issues at scale. The focus for impact from FRDC activities is on end-users. To this end, the FRDC also invests and facilitates extension of the R&D that will lead to adoption and commercialisation.

=== Stakeholder research priorities ===
A primary challenge for the FRDC is to continue to understand the needs and priorities of stakeholders as they evolve. The FRDC also works and holds regular planning and prioritisation meetings with the fishing and aquaculture community at sector, jurisdictional, regional and national levels to identify priorities and mechanisms for adoption important to them. In addition to industry, the FRDC works and meets with government and fisheries managers. These relationships are important in establishing R&D priorities, in particular the interaction with the Commonwealth Government as one of FRDC's major investors. They have a key role in not only the management of Australia's fisheries but also in setting priorities and assisting in adoption and use of R&D outputs. Issues identified from all stakeholders form an integral part of priority setting and go into the FRDC's planning and monitoring framework.

==== Australian Government priorities ====
The federal Minister for Agriculture, Drought and Emergency Management, the Hon David Littleproud MP and the Assistant Minister for Forestry and Fisheries, Senator the Hon Jonathon Duniam and the Department of Agriculture, Water and the Environment provide the key priorities that need to be addressed from an Australian government perspective. The department acts as the day to day policy intermediary between the offices of Minister, Assistant Minister and the FRDC.

==== Australian Fisheries Management Forum (AFMF) ====
The Australian Fisheries Management Forum comprises the heads of the federal, state and territory government agencies responsible for management of fisheries, who discuss strategic issues relating to fisheries and aquaculture management. The FRDC works with the forum, sitting as an invited representative to meetings, providing advice and ensuring forum priorities are incorporated into the corporation's RD&E planning processes.

The FRDC understands that adoption of research outputs by management agencies is a key to optimising management outcomes. It will continue to work with AFMF, participating as an invited representative to its meetings, providing advice and ensuring AFMF priorities are incorporated into planning and prioritisation processes.

== Relationships with stakeholders ==
In developing projects addressing the corporation's five programs, strategic directions are established in association with the FRDC's stakeholders, which are:

- the fishing and aquaculture commercial, recreational and indigenous sectors
- the federal, state and territory governments (including their fisheries managers and other natural resource managers)
- research partners (including universities, fisheries research organisations, industry and private sector research providers, and investors)
- the people of Australia (on whose behalf aquatic natural resources are managed, and as consumers).

The FRDC works with its partners to undertake program management effectively, to disseminate the results, and to assist with their adoption and, when appropriate, commercialisation.

=== Representative organisations ===
Four representative organisations have been appointed under the PIERD Act, with which the FRDC consults and reports formally at their annual general meetings:

- Australian Recreational and Sport Fishing Industry Confederation Inc. (trading as Recfish Australia)
- National Aquaculture Council Inc.
- Commonwealth Fisheries Association Inc.
- Seafood Industry Australia.

=== Rural research and development corporations ===
The FRDC continues to partner with other RDCs on a range of activities to enhance joint strategic outcomes. The FRDC attends meetings of the Council of Rural Research and Development Corporations (CRRDC), as well as meetings of executive directors, business managers and communications managers. It continues to be an active member of these groups driving a number of key areas in particular the CRRDC evaluation program.

The FRDC also partners and participates with other RDCs at the project level. A key area for collaboration has been the R&D for Profit Program and projects in which the FRDC is a co-investor. The FRDC has assisted in coordinating sponsorship and participation in events such as EvokeAg, ABARES 'Outlook' conference and individual projects on data, safety and community perceptions.

=== Levy organisation: Australian Prawn Farmers Association ===
The FRDC administers a research and development levy on behalf of the Australian Prawn Farmers Association (APFA), a levy organisation, which has a leading role with FRDC in ensuring its priorities are met. FRDC investments in prawn farming research and development is driven by the APFA's RD&E Plan. The two entities enjoy a very close working relationship. The APFA has nominated that the majority of its investment is to be through co-investment with the Australian Seafood CRC.

=== Industry sector bodies ===
The FRDC also has a close relationship with fishing, pearling and aquaculture industries through state industry councils and peak sector associations to build on the partnerships established with individual industry sectors.

The FRDC also invests in, and partners, entities such as Southern Rocklobster Ltd, Australian Southern Bluefin Tuna Industry Association, Tasmanian Salmonid Growers' Association, Australian Pearl Producers Association, Australian Prawn Farmers' Association and Australian Barramundi Farmers' Association.

== Research partners ==
In any given year, the corporation has under management about 300 active projects. Investment in research is the FRDC's core business. As a result, it is vital to the FRDC's success that it has excellent relationships with its research partners. The key research partners are:

- Department of Agriculture, Water and the Environment
- Australian Fisheries Management Authority
- State Fisheries Management Agencies
- Commonwealth Scientific and Industrial Research Organisation
- universities
- Cooperative Research Centres
- other rural research and development corporations and companies
- industry groups
- co-investors from the private sector.

== The Australian fishing and aquaculture commercial, recreational and indigenous sectors ==
=== Australia's Fisheries ===
Australia's marine domain, its exclusive economic zone, is one of the largest in the world, covering around 10 million square kilometres. This is larger than mainland Australia (7.69 million square kilometres). Australia has a long history of Indigenous, commercial and recreational fishing (including charter fishing) in its waters.

=== Wildcatch ===
Australia's commercial fisheries are diverse, operating from estuaries and bays, across the continental shelf to oceanic waters and, in some cases, on to the high seas. The seafood caught is also diverse, including scallops, prawns and squid, coastal fish such as whiting and flathead, reef fish such as Coral Trout, and oceanic tuna and billfish. Australian fisheries supply fresh seafood for local and domestic markets, as well as exporting high-value products.

The Gross Value of Production (GVP) for all of Australia's commercial fishing and aquaculture in 2017-18 financial year was over $3 billion a year with wild-capture fisheries contributed around 57 per cent ($1.71 billion) of the total value of Australia's fisheries production and produced more than 166 022 tonnes (t) of seafood, for local, domestic and export markets. Aquaculture (to be included in the future) contributed $1.35 billion and produced more than 93 965 tonnes.

For the latest information on fisheries statistics refer to Australian Fisheries Statistics.

=== Aquaculture ===
Australia has an international reputation as a producer of safe, sustainable and high quality seafood products. Most of the value of Australian aquaculture production comes from high value species such as pearls, salmonids, tuna and oysters but there are over forty species commercially produced in Australia.

Aquaculture production occurs throughout Australia, from the tropical north to the temperate south. The aquaculture industry is largely based in regional Australia and makes a significant and positive contribution to regional development.

==== Post-harvest ====
Elements of the post-harvest sector have previously been considered part of the aquaculture or commercial fishing sectors but, more recently, they have become a sector in their own right. The post-harvest sector includes some businesses that are vertically integrated controlling a product from harvest to delivery to the consumer. However, many businesses only operate in one area of the supply chain. There are many opportunities to improve profitability through better supply-chain connections.

=== Recreational fishing ===
Australian's enjoy a wide range of recreational fisheries as part of anything from the annual summer holiday to the more regular game fishers and even recreational tournament fishers. Geographically this spans from northern Australia for species such as Barramundi, Tropical Snappers, Coral Trout, Giant Trevally, Marlin and Tuna, to southern waters for Snapper, King George Whiting, Bream, Flathead and Southern Bluefin Tuna, and inland waters for trout and native fish such as Murray cod.

The last national survey of recreational fishers was undertaken in 2000. At that time:

- about 80 per cent of the recreational catch is from salt water – in estuaries, off beaches and from the ocean.
- The remaining 20 per cent is fished from fresh water – from rivers, lakes, dams and ponds.
- Recreational fishing is a huge activity in Australia with about 3.5 million people fishing each year.
- It is also big business with anglers spending about $650 million just on tackle.
- This doesn't include the $2.5 billion spend on boats 4×4 vehicles, accommodation, travel, charters, and all the other accessories.

For most people, the major reason for recreational fishing is to relax and unwind, but it is thought that people fish for a range of other reasons including some for the provision of food. Apart from being a source of food, fisheries resources are valued by the community in other ways. People derive reassurance knowing that the environment and the diversity of species are being maintained and that fisheries resources exist. The aquatic environment is also used by people, particularly tourists, who do not capture the resource, but simple observe and enjoy it.

=== Indigenous fishing ===
Aboriginal and Torres Strait Islander people have developed a close, interdependent relationship with the land, water and living resources of Australia through customary fishing practices over tens of thousands of years. That relationship includes indigenous rights and responsibilities of particular indigenous groups to particular areas of land, water and resources.

Fishing by Aboriginal and Torres Strait Islander people covers the full spectrum of fishing practices: customary, recreational and commercial.

== Sources ==
- FRDC (2012). Evolution of the FRDC to 2012 (PDF). Canberra: FRDC.
- FRDC (2013). Fisheries Research and Development Corporation annual report 2012–2013 (PDF). Canberra: FRDC.
- FRDC. FRDC corporate documents.
- FRDC (2010). Investing for tomorrow's fish: the FRDC's research, development and extension plan 2010–2015 (PDF). Canberra: FRDC.
