= Department of Agriculture, Fisheries and Forestry (Australia) =

Australian government department

Department of Agriculture, Fisheries and Forestry (DAFF)
- Logo of the Department of Agriculture, Fisheries and Forestry

Department overview
- Formed: 1 July 2022
- Preceding Department: Department of Agriculture, Water and the Environment
- Jurisdiction: Commonwealth of Australia
- Minister responsible: Julie Collins, Minister for Agriculture, Fisheries and Forestry
- Department executive: Victoria Anderson
- Child agencies: AgriFutures Australia; Australian Bureau of Agricultural and Resource Economics; Australian Fisheries Management Authority; Australian Pesticides and Veterinary Medicines Authority; Fisheries Research and Development Corporation; Grains Research and Development Corporation; Wine Australia
- Website: Official website

The Department of Agriculture, Fisheries and Forestry (DAFF) is a department of the Australian Government that was created on 1 July 2022. It was previously a part of the Department of Agriculture, Water and the Environment.

== Operational activities ==
In an Administrative Arrangements Order made on 13 May 2025, the functions of the department were broadly classified into the following matters:

- Agricultural, pastoral, fishing, food and forest industries
- Soils and other natural resources
- Rural adjustment and drought issues
- Rural industries inspection and quarantine
- Primary industries research including economic research
- Commodity marketing, including export promotion and agribusiness
- Commodity-specific international organisations and activities
- Administration of international commodity agreements
- Administration of export controls on agricultural, fisheries and forestry industries products
- Food security policy and programmes
- Biosecurity, in relation to animals and plants

== History ==
=== Preceding departments ===
- Department of Markets and Migration (16 January 1925 – 19 January 1928)
- Department of Markets (19 January 1928 – 10 December 1928)
- Department of Markets and Transport (10 December 1928 – 21 April 1930)
- Department of Markets (21 April 1930 – 13 April 1932)
- Department of Commerce (13 April 1932 – 22 December 1942)
- Department of Commerce and Agriculture (22 December 1942 – 11 January 1956)
- Department of Primary Industry (11 January 1956 – 2 June 1974)
- Department of Agriculture (12 June 1974 – 22 December 1975)
- Department of Primary Industry (22 December 1975 – 24 July 1987)
- Department of Primary Industries and Energy (24 July 1987 – 21 October 1998)
- Department of Agriculture, Fisheries and Forestry (21 October 1998 – 18 September 2013)
- Department of Agriculture (18 September 2013 – 21 September 2015)
- Department of Agriculture and Water Resources (21 September 2015 – 29 May 2019)
- Department of Agriculture (29 May 2019 – 1 February 2020)
- Department of Agriculture, Water and the Environment (1 February 2020 – 30 June 2022)
