= Australian Pesticides and Veterinary Medicines Authority =

Australian Government statutory agency

Agency overview
- Formed: 15 June 1993
- Preceding agency: National Registration Authority for Agricultural and Veterinary Chemicals
- Headquarters: Armidale, New South Wales
- Employees: 200 (2018)
- Parent agency: Department of Agriculture, Fisheries and Forestry
- Website: apvma.gov.au

The Australian Pesticides and Veterinary Medicines Authority (APVMA) is the Australian Government statutory agency responsible for the management and regulation of all agricultural and veterinary chemical products in Australia.

== History ==
The APVMA was established on 15 June 1993 as the National Registration Authority for Agricultural and Veterinary Chemicals, under the Agricultural and Veterinary Chemicals (Administration) Act 1992.

== Current responsibilities ==
Any agricultural or veterinary product that is manufactured, sold, imported, or used in Australia must first be registered by the APVMA. To be registered, the process may include scientific evaluations of the safety and efficacy of the product.

== See also ==
- Department of Agriculture and Water Resources
