= Department of Primary Industries and Energy =

Australian government department, 1987–1998

Department overview
- Formed: 24 July 1987
- Preceding Department: Department of Resources and Energy Department of Primary Industry (II)
- Dissolved: 21 October 1998
- Superseding Department: Department of Agriculture, Fisheries and Forestry Department of Industry, Science and Resources
- Jurisdiction: Commonwealth of Australia
- Headquarters: Canberra
- Ministers responsible: John Kerin, Minister (1987–1991); Simon Crean, Minister (1991–1993); Bob Collins, Minister (1993–1996); John Anderson, Minister (1996–1998)
- Department executives: Graham Evans, Secretary (1987–1988); Geoff Miller, Secretary (1988–1993); Greg Taylor, Secretary (1993–1996); Paul Barratt, Secretary (1996–1998); Ken Matthews, Secretary (1998)
- Website: dpie.gov.au

The Department of Primary Industries and Energy was an Australian government department that existed between July 1987 and October 1998.

== Scope ==
Information about the department's functions and government funding allocation could be found in the Administrative Arrangements Orders, the annual Portfolio Budget Statements and in the Department's annual reports.

At its creation, the Department was responsible for:

- Agricultural, pastoral, fishing, forest, mineral and energy industries, and electricity
- Water and other natural resources
- Primary industries inspection and quarantine
- Primary industries and energy science and research, including geoscience
- Commodity marketing, including export promotion
- Commodity-specific international organisations and activities
- Administration of international commodity agreements
- Administration of export controls on primary industries and energy products
- Radioactive waste management

== Structure ==
The Department was an Australian Public Service department, staffed by officials who were responsible to the Minister for Primary Industries and Energy.
