= DISR =

DISR is a four-letter acronym that may stand for:

- German International School Riyadh
- Department of Industry, Science and Resources
  - Department of Industry, Science and Resources (1998–2001)
