= Farrer Memorial Agricultural High School =

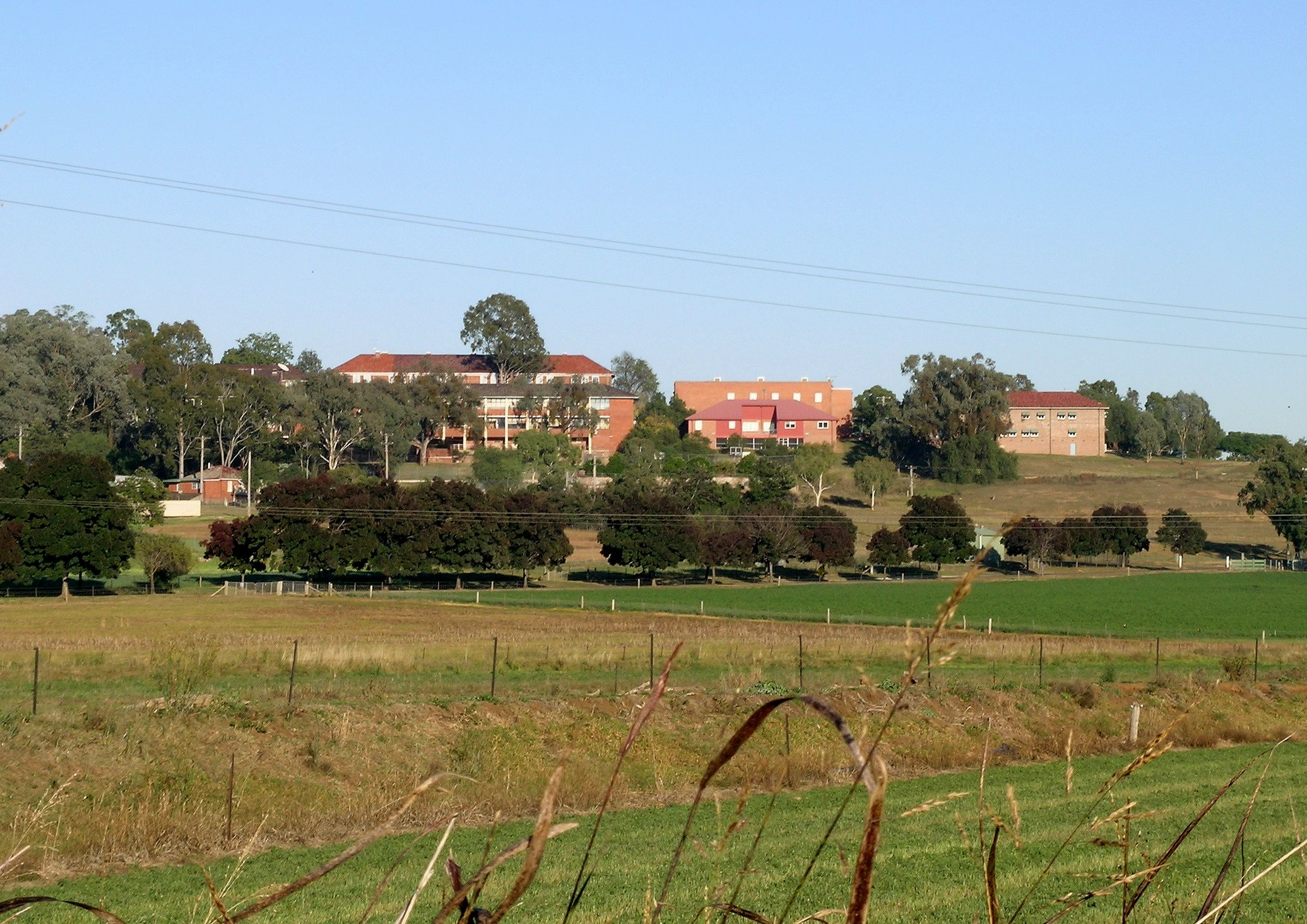
- Farrer Memorial Agricultural High School

Location
- Calala, Tamworth, New England, New South Wales; Australia; 31°08′22″S 150°58′53″E

Information
- Type: Government academically selective and specialist secondary day and boarding school
- Motto: Latin: Ad Aspera Virtus (Strength in Adversity)
- Established: 1939; 87 years ago
- School district: Peel; Regional North
- Educational authority: NSW Department of Education
- Specialist: Agricultural school
- Principal: Clint Gallagher
- Teaching staff: 50.4 FTE (2025)
- Years: 7–12
- Gender: Boys
- Enrolment: 606 (2025)
- Area: 140 hectares (346 acres)
- Campus type: Rural
- Colours: Green, gold and rust
- Website: www.farrer.nsw.edu.au

The Farrer Memorial Agricultural High School is a government boys' academically selective and specialist secondary day and boarding school, located in Calala, a small suburb of Tamworth, in the New England region of New South Wales, Australia. It is the only public agricultural high school for boys in Australia.

Established in 1939, the school enrolled 606 students in 2025, from Year 7 to Year 12, of whom 13% of students identified as Indigenous Australians and two percent were from a language background other than English. The school is operated by the NSW Department of Education; the principal is Clint Gallagher.

== Overview ==
Established in 1939, Farrer is one of the few agricultural secondary schools catering for both boarding and day students. As of 2007, the school enrolled approximately 610 students from Year 7 to Year 12, including 360 boarders, making it the third largest boarding school in the State. Being a public high School, tuition is free, and the school charges the lowest boarding fees in New South Wales.

While an emphasis is placed on the agricultural curriculum, but a broad curriculum is also on offer for students from rural NSW who do not wish to return to the land or gain employment in an agricultural field. Other areas of emphasis at Farrer include sport and student welfare.

Farrer embodies a conservative culture with a high degree of inclusiveness of Ethnicity and Disabilities. School uniform is compulsory and is traditional in style, including blazer, tie and wide-brimmed hat. The school marches each week as part of the school assembly, and a prefect system is in place, playing an important role in the welfare and supervision of students.

== History ==
Farrer Memorial High School was founded in 1939 as an agricultural high school for boarders, particularly those who are isolated and day students from the Tamworth region.

The school was named in memory of William James Farrer (1845–1906), a leading Australian agronomist and wheat breeder, best known for developing the "Federation" breed of wheat. His work led to significant increases in the Australian wheat crop for decades to come, and economic prosperity for the wheat industry.

== Campus ==
The Farrer campus is set on 140 hectares (346 acres), and is located on the outskirts of rural Tamworth, on prime Peel Valley farmland.

The school's facilities include computer rooms, TAS workshops, a 200-seat auditorium, Old Boys' museum and multiple facilities to teach practical agriculture, such as a 170 hectares (420 acres) farm, horticultural centre and piggery. The dairy cattle, White Suffolk sheep flock and Angus cattle stud are run as profitable business ventures, turning over in excess of A$140,000 at the Bull Sale in 2005.

The school's sporting facilities include a gymnasium, swimming pool, weights room, tennis courts, basketball courts, football fields and a cricket oval with practice nets. The school also makes use of the city's sporting facilities, including the synthetic hockey surface and athletics track.

== Curriculum ==
Students at Farrer have the opportunity to undertake study in a number of areas from their School Certificate in Years 9 and 10, through to their NSW Higher School Certificate (HSC) in Years 11 and 12. Some of these subject areas on offer include: industrial tech metal, industrial tech wood, electronics, information and software technology, art, music, drama, software design and development, beef production, sheep production, sport science and journalism.

Agricultural opportunities include beef cattle, sheep, dairy cattle, wool husbandry, horticulture, pig production, egg growing, dry land and irrigated cropping. Agriculture at Farrer is mandatory for years 7 to 10.

== Sack system ==
In years past, a "sack" was a student in lower years, particularly years 7–10. Such students were at the beck and call of students in higher years, particularly year 12, to labour at menial tasks such as shining boots, fetching food or creating confetti with a paper hole punch. The name "sack" was said to be derived from the idea that younger years were a load to carry, as a sack.

The power was not restricted to year 12. Students of any year higher than another were empowered to issue such commands. For example, a year 8 boy could make demands of a year 7 boy. In this respect, the sack system may differ from the English practice of fagging.

Failure to comply on the part of a "sack" was often disciplined with corporal punishment from the year 12 students. This punishment commonly took the form of being struck on the backside with a broom, occasionally without pants. Active resistance to the system was met with ongoing intimidation, assault and bullying from many members of the school community, including the principal.

This punishment resulted in the interesting linguistic twist of the word broom being used as a verb. For example, "Tell that sack to get on with it or he's going to get broomed".

The school has now admitted in court that this system existed and that it failed to implement adequate control.

== Notable alumni ==
Alumni of Farrer Memorial Agricultural High School are known as Old Boys, and may elect to join the school's alumni association, the Farrer Old Boys' Association. The Old Boys' network totals approximately 4,000 members. Some notable Farrer Old Boys include:

Academic

- Michael Kilborn – cardiologist at Royal Prince Alfred Hospital; Associate Professor of Clinical Medicine at the University of Sydney and now works at a top medical magazine in London
- Robert Henry Tufrey Smith AM – Chancellor of the University of Ballarat; Emeritus Professor at the University of New England

Entertainment, media and the arts

- Arthur Blanch – singer; Golden Guitar winner; inducted into the Country Music Roll of Renown
- Pixie Jenkins – musician; Golden Guitar winning fiddler
- Stuart Maunder – Director of Opera Australia

Politics, public service and the law

- Mark Coulton – Member for Parkes (2007–2025), Deputy Speaker of the Australian House of Representatives (2016–2018)
- Adam Marshall – Member for Northern Tablelands (2013–2024)
- Geoff Miller – secretary of Department of Primary Industry (1986–1993) and secretary of Department of Tourism (1991–1993)
- Tony Windsor – Member for New England (2001–2013) and Member for Tamworth (1991–2001)

Sport

- George Barton – sport shooter who represented Australia at the Athens and Beijing Olympics
- Geoff Chapman – rugby union player who played for the Wallabies; horse trainer
- Tom Learoyd-Lahrs – rugby league player for the Brisbane Broncos and Canberra Raiders
- John Porch – rugby union player for Vannes
- Matthew Smith – hockey player who represented Australia at the Atlanta Olympics
- Richard Swain – rugby league player for the Hunter Mariners, Melbourne Storm, Brisbane Broncos and the New Zealand national side
- Peter Taylor – rugby league player for the South Sydney Rabbitohs
- Alan Tongue – rugby league player; former captain of the Canberra Raiders
- Peter Worsley – rifle shooter who represented Australia at the Atlanta, Sydney and Athens Paralympics

== See also ==
- List of government schools in New South Wales
- List of selective high schools in New South Wales
- List of boarding schools in Australia
- List of schools in Tamworth
