= Michael Kilborn =

Australian cardiologist and cricketer

- Born: Michael John Kilborn; 20 September 1962 (age 64); Gunnedah, Australia
- Education: University of New South Wales; St John's College, Oxford
- Occupations: Cardiologist and electrophysiologist
- Cricket career

Cricket information
- Batting: Right-handed
- Bowling: Right-arm medium

Domestic team information
- Years: Team
- 1986–1990: Oxford University

Career statistics
| Competition | First-class | List A |
|---|---|---|
| Matches | 31 | 2 |
| Runs scored | 1,275 | 24 |
| Batting average | 28.33 | 12.00 |
| 100s/50s | –/7 | –/– |
| Top score | 95 | 14 |
| Balls bowled | 389 | 30 |
| Wickets | 6 | 0 |
| Bowling average | 52.00 | – |
| 5 wickets in innings | – | – |
| 10 wickets in match | – | – |
| Best bowling | 3/37 | – |
| Catches/stumpings | 23/– | –/– |
- Source: Cricinfo, 1 September 2019

Michael John Kilborn (born 20 September 1962) is an Australian former cricketer and a cardiologist and electrophysiologist at Royal Prince Alfred Hospital in Sydney.

== Early life ==
Kilborn was born at Gunnedah, New South Wales in September 1962. He completed his Higher School Certificate at Tamworth's Farrer Memorial Agricultural High School in 1980, placing eighth in New South Wales that year. He initially intended to study science and law, but changed to science and medicine at the last moment under the influence of his grandmother. He commenced science/medicine studies at the University of New South Wales before winning the Rhodes Scholarship in 1985 and completing his qualifying medical degree (BM BCh) and PhD (DPhil) at the University of Oxford.

== Cricket ==
While studying at Oxford, Kilborn made his debut in first-class cricket for Oxford University Cricket Club against Gloucestershire at Oxford in 1986. He played first-class cricket for Oxford until 1990, making 29 appearances. Playing as a batsman, he scored 1,217 runs at an average of 28.97. He made seven half-centuries, with a high score of 95. With his part-time right-arm medium pace bowling, he took 6 wickets with best figures of 3 for 37.

Kilborn also made two first-class appearances for a combined Oxford and Cambridge Universities cricket team against the touring Pakistanis in 1987 and the touring New Zealanders in 1990.

In addition to playing first-class cricket while at Oxford, Kilborn also made two List A one-day appearances for the Combined Universities cricket team in the 1988 Benson & Hedges Cup.

== Medicine ==
After graduating from Oxford with a DPhil in Physiological Sciences, Kilborn became a cardiologist.

Before returning permanently to Australia, Kilborn spent over 3 years in the United States as a Fellow and Assistant Professor in Clinical Cardiac Electrophysiology and in Clinical Pharmacology at the Georgetown University Medical Center and the Washington DC Veterans Affairs Medical Center.

Kilborn is the senior staff cardiologist and director of the Arrhythmia Service and ECG Laboratory at the Royal Prince Alfred Hospital, Sydney.
