= Department of Tourism =

Department of Tourism may refer to:

- Department of Tourism (Australia), an Australian Government Department that existed between 1991 and 1996
- Department of Tourism (Kerala)
- Department of Tourism (Philippines)
- Department of Tourism (South Africa)
- Department of Tourism (West Bengal)
