= Ptilotus mitchellii =

Conservation status
- Priority One — Poorly Known Taxa (DEC)

Scientific classification
- Kingdom: Plantae
- Clade: Tracheophytes
- Clade: Angiosperms
- Clade: Eudicots
- Order: Caryophyllales
- Family: Amaranthaceae
- Genus: Ptilotus
- Species: P. mitchellii

Binomial name
- Ptilotus mitchellii Benl

Species of herb

Ptilotus mitchellii is a species of flowering plant in the family Amaranthaceae and is endemic to northern inland Western Australia. It is a bushy shrublet or straggling shrub with a single stem and many densely leafy shoots, the stem leaves glabrous, and oval or cylindrical clusters of magenta or red flowers.

== Description ==
Ptilotus mitchellii is a bushy shrublet or straggling shrub that typically grows to a height of up to about 1 m (3 ft 3 in), with a single stem and many densely leafy shoots. The stem leaves are arranged alternately, 8–40 mm (0.31–1.57 in) long, 3–15 mm (0.12–0.59 in) wide and glabrous or becoming glabrous. The flowers are magenta or red and densely arranged in oval or cylindrical spikes. There are colourless, glabrous bracts 3–4 mm (0.12–0.16 in) long and bracteoles 3.5–3.8 mm (0.14–0.15 in) long, all with a prominent midrib. The outer tepals are 6.0–6.5 mm (0.24–0.26 in) long and the inner tepals 5.9 mm (0.23 in) long. The style is 2.4 mm (0.094 in) long, straight and fixed to the centre of the ovary. Flowering occurs from September to October.

== Taxonomy ==
Ptilotus mitchellii was first formally described in 1994 by Gerard Benl in the journal Sendtnera from specimens collected about 6 km (3.7 mi) west of Mount Boggola at the end of a Newcrest exploration track. The specific epithet (mitchellii) honours "Mr. Andrew A. Mitchell, who was then officer-in-charge of the Department of Agriculture Karratha".

== Distribution ==
This species of Ptilotus is only known from the type location in the Gascoyne bioregion of northern inland Western Australia.

== Conservation status ==
Ptilotus mitchellii is listed as "Priority One" by the Government of Western Australia Department of Biodiversity, Conservation and Attractions, meaning that it is known from only one or a few locations that are potentially at risk.

== See also ==
- List of Ptilotus species
