= Acacia besleyi =

Bes' wattle

Conservation status
- Priority One — Poorly Known Taxa (DEC)

Scientific classification
- Kingdom: Plantae
- Clade: Tracheophytes
- Clade: Angiosperms
- Clade: Eudicots
- Clade: Rosids
- Order: Fabales
- Family: Fabaceae
- Subfamily: Caesalpinioideae
- Clade: Mimosoid clade
- Genus: Acacia
- Species: A. besleyi

Binomial name
- Acacia besleyi Maslin

Species of legume

Acacia besleyi, also known as Bes' wattle, is a species of flowering plant in the family Fabaceae and is endemic to a small area near Ravensthorpe in the south-west of Western Australia. It is a rounded, often bushy shrub with linear, thinly leathery phyllodes, spherical heads of yellow flowers and narrowly oblong pods up to 30 mm (1.2 in) long.

== Description ==
Acacia besleyi is a rounded, or inverted cone-shaped, often bushy shrub 1–3 m (3 ft 3 in – 9 ft 10 in) high, with linear, thinly leathery phyllodes 40–85 mm (1.6–3.3 in) long and 2–3 mm (0.079–0.118 in) wide with triangular stipules up to 0.5 mm (0.020 in) long at the base. There are three to five parallel veins, and a gland 1–3 mm (0.039–0.118 in) above the base of the phyllodes. One or two spherical heads of flowers are borne in axils on peduncles 5–8 mm (0.20–0.31 in) long, the heads are about 5 mm (0.20 in) in diameter with 15 to 22 yellow flowers. Flowering mostly occurs in October, and the pods are thinly leathery to crust-like, narrowly oblong, 10–30 mm (0.39–1.18 in) long and 3.5–5 mm (0.14–0.20 in) wide, containing oblong seeds 2.8–3.5 mm (0.11–0.14 in) long with a white, club-shaped aril.

== Taxonomy ==
Acacia besleyi was first formally described in 2014 by Bruce Maslin in the journal Nuytsia from specimens he collected south of Ravensthorpe in 2013. The specific epithet (besleyi) honours Laurie Besley ("Bes"), a "distinguished scientist with CSIRO in Sydney and director of the National Measurement Institute in Sydney".

== Distribution and habitat ==
Bes' wattle is only known from a few populations in the Ravensthorpe Range, where it grows in undulating country in rocky places in mallee scrub.

== Conservation status ==
Acacia besleyi is listed as "Priority One" by the Government of Western Australia Department of Biodiversity, Conservation and Attractions, meaning that it is known from only one or a few locations where it is potentially at risk.

== See also ==
- List of Acacia species
