= Geoff Miller (public servant) =

Australian public servant (1942–2014)

Geoff Miller AO

Secretary of the Department of Primary Industry
- In office 1986–1987

Secretary of the Department of Primary Industries and Energy
- In office 1988–1993

Secretary of the Department of Tourism
- In office 27 December 1991 – 1993

Personal details
- Born: Geoffrey Lee Miller; 26 January 1942 Grafton, New South Wales
- Died: 10 October 2014 (aged 72)
- Education: University of New England
- Occupation: Public servant

Geoffrey Lee Miller AO (26 January 1942 – 10 October 2014) was a senior Australian public servant.

== Life and career ==
Geoff Miller was born in Grafton, New South Wales on 26 January 1942. For high school, he attended Farrer Memorial Agricultural High School in Tamworth, New South Wales. His university studies were at the University of New England where he completed a degree in agricultural economics with first class honours.

He began his career in a state agricultural department, before shifting to work for CSR Limited.

In 1986, Miller was appointed Secretary of the Department of Primary Industry. In July 1987 he became Associate Secretary of the Department of Foreign Affairs and Trade, but was again appointed as a Secretary in 1988, this time of the Department of Primary Industries and Energy. During the period December 1991 to June 1993, Miller was concurrently Secretary to the Department of Primary Industries and Energy and the Department of Tourism.

As an associate secretary of the Department of Primary Industries and Energy, Miller bid for the position of Director-General of the United Nations Food and Agricultural Organisation. He was defeated in a ballot for the position by 90 votes to 72 votes. The Australian Government spent more than $500,000 on the unsuccessful campaign to have Miller appointed to the position. Miller retired from the public service in February 1994.

Miller died on 10 October 2014.

== Awards ==
Miller was awarded Man of the Year in Australian Agriculture in 1978.

In June 1993, Miller was made an Officer of the Order of Australia for service to primary industry, particularly in the area of agricultural economics and to international relations.

Government offices
Preceded by Lindsay Duthie	Secretary of the Department of Primary Industry; 1986–1987	Succeeded by Graham Evans as Secretary of the Department of Primary Industries and Energy
Preceded by Graham Evans	Secretary of the Department of Primary Industries and Energy; 1988–1993	Succeeded by Greg Taylor
Preceded by Tony Blunn as Secretary of the Department of the Arts, Sport, the Environment, Tourism and Territories	Secretary of the Department of Tourism; 1991–1993	Succeeded by Helen Williams
