= Department of Industry, Science and Tourism =

Australian government department, 1996–1998

Department overview
- Formed: 11 March 1996
- Preceding Department: Department of the Prime Minister and Cabinet – for certain science functions Department of Tourism Department of Housing and Regional Development – for industry aspects of the housing function Department of Industry, Science and Technology
- Dissolved: 21 October 1998
- Superseding Department: Department of Workplace Relations and Small Business Department of Communications, Information Technology and the Arts Department of Industry, Science and Resources
- Jurisdiction: Commonwealth of Australia
- Headquarters: Canberra
- Minister responsible: John Moore, Minister for Industry, Science and Tourism
- Department executives: Greg Taylor, Secretary (1996); Russell Higgins, Secretary (1997–1998)
- Website: dist.gov.au at the Wayback Machine (archived 2 November 1996)

The Department of Industry, Science and Tourism (also called DIST) was an Australian government department that existed between March 1996 and October 1998.

== Scope ==
Information about the department's functions and government funding allocation could be found in the Administrative Arrangements Orders, the annual Portfolio Budget Statements, in the Department's annual reports and on the Department's website.

According to the Administrative Arrangements Order made on 11 March 1996, the Department dealt with:

- Manufacturing and commerce including industries development
- Science and technology, including industrial research and development
- Export services
- Marketing, including export promotion, of manufactures and services
- Investment promotion
- Small business
- Tourism, including the tourist industry and participation in international expositions
- Construction industry
- Duties of customs and excise
- Bounties on the production of goods
- Offsets, to the extent not dealt with by the Department of Defence
- Patents of inventions and designs, and trade marks
- Consumer affairs
- Weights and measures
- Civil space program

== Structure ==
The Department was an Australian Public Service department, staffed by officials who were responsible to the Minister for Industry, Science and Tourism, John Moore. As at 1997, the Department was headed by a Secretary, and had nine divisions, six state offices and eight overseas posts. The Secretary of the Department was Greg Taylor (until December 1996) and then Russell Higgins.
