= Walter Ives =

Walter Ives CBE

Secretary of the Department of Primary Industry (I)
- In office 30 December 1968 – 12 June 1974

Secretary of the Department of Agriculture
- In office 12 June 1974 – 22 December 1975

Secretary of the Department of Primary Industry (II)
- In office 22 December 1975 – 18 May 1978

Personal details
- Born: 26 August 1917
- Died: 20 December 2006 (aged 89)
- Resting place: Northern Suburbs Memorial Gardens
- Spouse: Betty
- Education: University of Sydney
- Occupation: Public servant

Walter Ives CBE (26 August 1917 – 20 December 2006) was a senior Australian public servant. He was head of the Department of Primary Industry from 1968 to 1978.

== Life and career ==
Walter Ives was born on 26 August 1917.

Ives worked in the CSIRO, and was appointed to the Department of Primary Industry in 1969 from his position there. As the Department of Primary Industry transitioned to become the Department of Agriculture, and then the Department of Primary Industry again, Ives remained its head.

In May 1978, Ives was named as the first chairman of the Primary Industry Bank of Australia, and he left the Department of Primary Industry.

Ives died on 20 December 2006, aged 89.

== Awards ==
Ives was appointed a Commander of the Order of the British Empire in June 1976 for his public service.

Government offices
| Preceded by Alf Maiden | Secretary of the Department of Primary Industry (I); 1968 – 1974 | Succeeded by Himself as Secretary of the Department of Agriculture |
| Preceded by Himself as Secretary of the Department of Primary Industry | Secretary of the Department of Agriculture; 1974 – 1975 | Succeeded by Himself as Secretary of the Department of Primary Industry |
| Preceded by Himself as Secretary of the Department of Agriculture | Secretary of the Department of Primary Industry (II); 1975 – 1978 | Succeeded by Doug McKay |
