= Lindsay Duthie =

Australian public servant

Lindsay Duthie AM

Secretary of the Department of Primary Industry
- In office 23 April 1980 – 10 February 1986

Personal details
- Born: Lindsay Percival Duthie Wiluna, Western Australia
- Spouse: Joan
- Occupation: Public servant

Lindsay Percival Duthie AM is an Australian former senior public servant, best known for his time as Secretary of the Department of Primary Industry, between 1980 and 1986.

== Life and career ==
Lindsay Duthie was born in the early 1930s in Wiluna, Western Australia.

He joined the Commonwealth Public Service in 1951 in the Department of Trade and Customs. In 1976, he was appointed Deputy Secretary in the Department of Trade and Resources.

Duthie was appointed Secretary of the Department of Primary Industry in April 1980.

In 1986, in the departmental reshuffle, Duthie was removed as head of the Primary Industry Department, going on to become Special Trade Representative of Australia to Europe between 1986 and 1990.

== Awards ==
Duthie was appointed a Member of the Order of Australia in January 1992, in recognition of his service to international trade.

Government offices
Preceded by Doug McKay	Secretary of the Department of Primary Industry; 1980 – 1986	Succeeded by Geoff Miller
