= AusIndustry =

AusIndustry is the Australian Government's business support program, part of the Department of Industry, Science and Resources. AusIndustry delivers programs worth around US$2 billion per year as of 2011. It provides businesses and individuals with innovation grants, clean technology, tax incentives, duty concessions, small business development, industry support, and venture capital.

== History ==
The Australian Government announced the creation of AusIndustry on 4 May 1994 as a result of the White Paper Working Nation: White Paper on Employment and Growth 1994.
