= Peter Taylor (rugby league) =

Australian rugby league footballer

Personal information
- Full name: Peter Laurence Taylor
- Born: 13 July 1985 (age 39); Tamworth, New South Wales, Australia

Playing information
- Position: Fullback
Club
Years	Team	Pld	T	G	FG	P
2005	South Sydney Rabbitohs	1	0	0	0	0

Peter Taylor (born 13 July 1985) is an Australian former rugby league footballer who played in the 2000s. He played for the South Sydney Rabbitohs. His position of choice was fullback.

== Playing career ==
Taylor was educated at Farrer Memorial Agricultural High School in Tamworth. In 2002, while still in high school, he joined the Sydney Roosters and became a regular member of their side in the lower grade competitions. In 2005, Taylor joined the South Sydney Rabbitohs, he made his lone first grade appearance from the bench in his side's 12-10 loss to the Canberra Raiders at the Sydney Football Stadium in round 3 of the 2005 season. He was released by the Rabbitohs at season's end and subsequently never played first grade again.
