= Russell Higgins =

Australian public servant

Russell Higgins AO

Secretary of the Department of Industry, Science and Tourism
- In office 27 January 1997 – 21 October 1998

Secretary of the Department of Industry, Science and Resources
- In office 21 October 1998 – 26 November 2001

Personal details
- Born: Russell Allan Higgins
- Occupation: Public servant

Russell Allan Higgins AO is a former senior Australian public servant and policymaker.

== Life and career ==
Higgins was appointed Secretary of the Department of Industry, Science and Tourism on 27 January 1997. After the department was abolished in 1998, Higgins was appointed Secretary of the new Department of Industry, Science and Resources.

In 2006, Higgins was appointed to the Prime Ministerial Task Group on Emissions Trading.

Higgins was appointed Chair of the Board of the Global CCS Institute in June 2009.

In June 2013, Higgins was appointed to the board of Leighton Holdings. He resigned from the board in May 2014.

== Awards ==
In 2001, Higgins was awarded the Centenary Medal in recognition of his outstanding service to government.

Higgins was made an Officer of the Order of Australia in January 2006 for service to the community through the development and implementation of a broad range of government policies including financial management and accountability, microeconomic reform, and science and innovation strategies.

Government offices
Preceded by Greg Taylor	Secretary of the Department of Industry, Science and Tourism; 1997 – 1998	Succeeded by Himself as Secretary of the Department of Industry, Science and Resources
Preceded by Himself as Secretary of the Department of Industry, Science and Tourism	Secretary of the Department of Industry, Science and Resources; 1998 – 2001	Succeeded by Mark Paterson as Secretary of the Department of Industry, Tourism and Resources
