= New England Coaches =

Australian coach company

- Parent: DV Arandale
- Headquarters: Glen Innes
- Service area: Northern New South Wales; South East Queensland
- Service type: Charter coach operator
- Depots: 1
- Fleet: 7(June 2024)
- Website: www.newenglandcoaches.com.au

New England Coaches is an Australian charter coach company based in Northern New South Wales.

== History ==
New England Coaches is a coach operator, based in Glen Innes. Trading as Arandale Coaches, it operated route and school services for many years, gradually selling these.

In 2010, it commenced operating a coach service from Tamworth to Port Macquarie. This ceased in May 2011. The formerly operated Tamworth to Port Macquarie service has been reinstated as Tamworth to Coffs Harbour, operating Mondays, Wednesdays and Fridays.

In July 2012, New England Coaches commenced operating a service from Tamworth to Warwick where it connects with Crisps Coaches services to Toowoomba and Brisbane. It also operates a coach service from Tamworth to Coffs Harbour.

In early 2021, it ended all public coach service operations.

== Fleet ==
As of June 2023, the fleet consisted of seven coaches.
