= Tamworth Post Office =

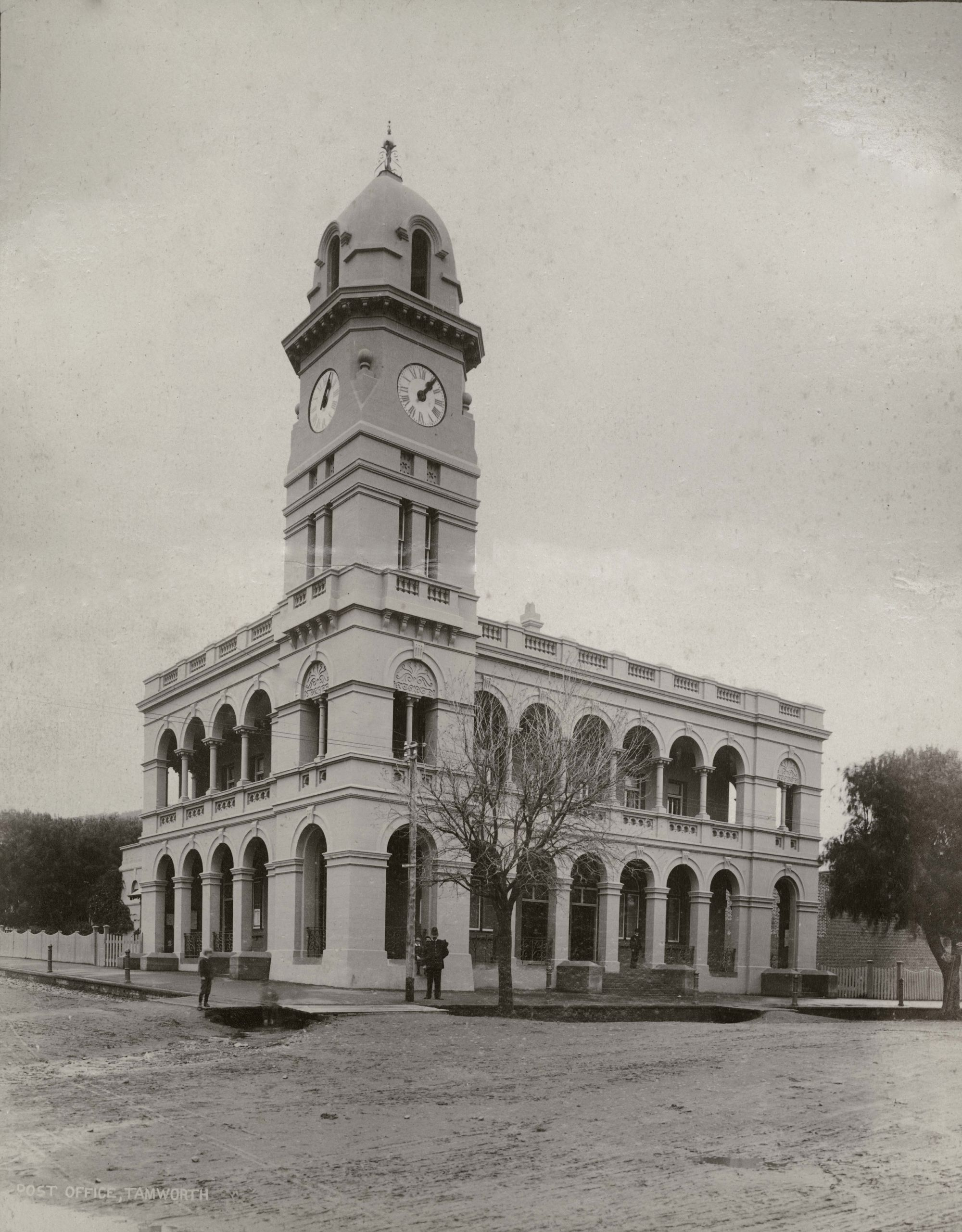
- Tamworth Post Office, c. 1890s

- Location within New South Wales Location within Australia
- 31°05′30″S 150°55′53″E
- Location: Fitzroy Street, Tamworth, Tamworth Regional Council, New South Wales, Australia

History
- Built: 1886

Site notes
- Architect: James Barnet (Colonial Architect's Office)
- Architectural styles: Victorian Italianate; Federation Free Classical
- Owner: Australia Post

New South Wales Heritage Register
- Official name: Tamworth Post Office
- Type: State heritage (built)
- Designated: 22 December 2000
- Reference no.: 1421
- Type: Post Office
- Category: Postal and Telecommunications
- Builders: W. C. Cains

The Tamworth Post Office is a State heritage-listed post office located on the corner of Fitzroy Street and Peel Street, Tamworth in the Tamworth Regional Council local government area of New South Wales, Australia. It was designed by the Colonial Architect's Office under James Barnet and built by W. C. Cains. The property is owned by Australia Post and was added to the New South Wales State Heritage Register on 22 December 2000.

== History ==
=== Background ===
The first official postal service in Australia was established in April 1809, when Sydney merchant Isaac Nichols was appointed as the first Postmaster in the Colony of New South Wales. Prior to this, mail had been distributed directly by the captain of the ship on which the mail arrived; however, this system was neither reliable nor secure.

In 1825 the colonial administration was empowered to establish a NSW Postmaster General's Department, which had previously been administered from Britain.

In 1828 the first post offices outside of Sydney were established, with offices in Bathurst, Campbelltown, Parramatta, Liverpool, Newcastle, Penrith and Windsor. By 1839 there were forty post offices in the colony, with more opening as settlement spread. The advance of postal services was further increased as the railway network began to be established throughout NSW from the 1860s. Also, in 1863, the Postmaster General W. H. Christie noted that accommodation facilities for postmasters in some post offices was quite limited, and stated that it was a matter of importance that "post masters should reside and sleep under the same roof as the office".

The appointment of James Barnet as Acting Colonial Architect in 1862 coincided with a considerable increase in funding to the public works program. Between 1865 and 1890 the Colonial Architect's Office was responsible for the building and maintenance of 169 post offices and telegraph offices in NSW. The post offices constructed during this period were designed in a variety of architectural styles, as Barnet argued that the local parliamentary representatives always preferred "different patterns".

The construction of new post offices continued throughout the depression years under the leadership of Walter Liberty Vernon, who retained office from 1890 to 1911. While twenty-seven post offices were built between 1892 and 1895, funding to the Government Architect's Office was cut from 1893 to 1895, causing Vernon to postpone a number of projects.

Following Federation in 1901, the Commonwealth Government took over responsibility for post, telegraph and telephone offices, with the Department of Home Affairs Works Division being made responsible for post office construction. In 1916 construction was transferred to the Department of Works and Railways, with the Department of the Interior responsible during World War II.

On 22 December 1975 the Postmaster-General's Department was abolished and replaced by the Postal and Telecommunications Department, with Telecom and Australia Post being created. In 1989, the Australian Postal Corporation Act established Australia Post as a self-funding entity, which heralded a new direction in property management, including a move towards smaller, shop-front style post offices away from the larger more traditional buildings.

For much of its history, the post office has been responsible for a wide variety of community services including mail distribution, as agencies for the Commonwealth Savings Bank, electoral enrolments, and the provision of telegraph and telephone services. The town post office served as a focal point for the community, most often built in a prominent position in the center of town close to other public buildings, creating a nucleus of civic buildings and community pride.

=== European history of Tamworth ===
Europeans first crossed the Peel River Valley and Tamworth district in 1818, when John Oxley explored the area during his second expedition north from Bathurst. Despite his favourable assessment of the areas' rich grazing land it was another nine years before the first pastoralists began to settle in the district. In 1832 the Australian Agricultural Company (AA Co) took up two large plots of land in exchange for land they already held in Port Stephens. One of these plots equalling 313,298 acres (121,410 hectares) included the site that would be selected for the settlement of Tamworth. In July 1834 the first buildings were erected by the AA Co to house their employees, their stores and their two hundred assigned convicts. The site chosen was in what is now Ebsworth Street. Initially the AA Co provided all the essential community services including doctor, hospital and school; however, by the close of the 1830s, several shops and hotels had been built privately to service the Company's employees. This constituted the beginning of the township of Tamworth.

In November 1835, James White opened a store on the east side of the river in what is now Peel Street. His was the first building on the east side. White traded for eighteen months before selling the business to Richard Stubbs and his partner J. J. C. Irving. In 1839 they too sold the store, this time to Thomas Byrne, who in 1840 became Tamworth's first Postmaster. In 1847 the AA Co Commissioner, Phillip Parker King, suggested to the Commissioner for Crown Lands, Roderick Mitchell, that Tamworth be laid out as a town. Surveyor John Gorman submitted his plan for a Tamworth Reserve on 31 July 1849, after which Sir Thomas Mitchell, Roderick's father, began laying out the design for the town and named its original streets. The first sale of building blocks in the Government town took place in July 1850, with most of the land being sold by 1853. However, the town was slow to develop, with only 600 residents by the end of the 1850s.

=== Establishment of Tamworth Post Office ===
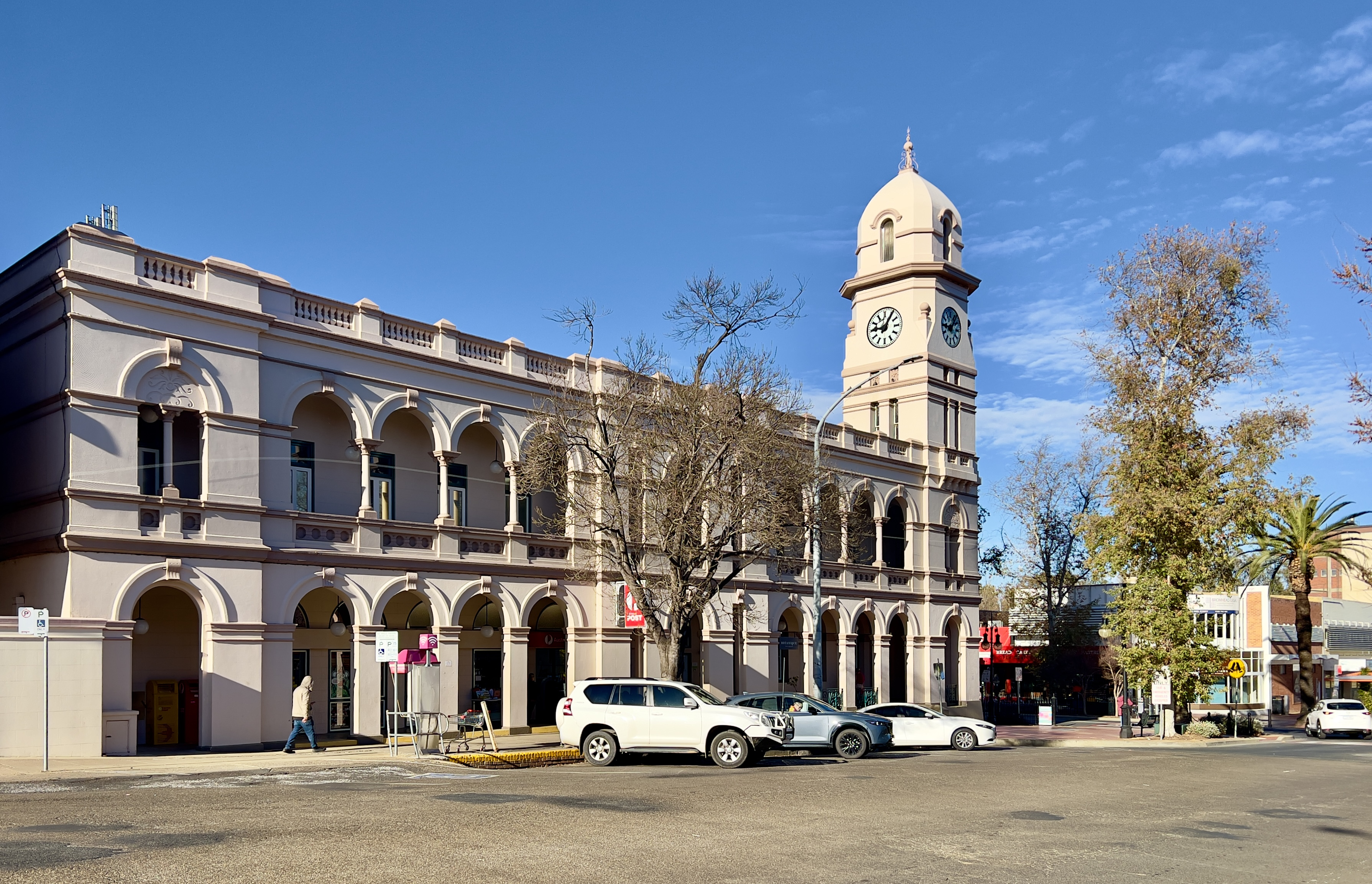
Tamworth Post Office, 2023

Tamworth continued to grow steadily through the 1860s. In 1861 the telegraph line was extended to Tamworth with a new telegraph office being built in 1866. Within this office a room was set aside for use as a post office but soon proved to be too small. Following agitation from the local residents, £1,000 was set aside in 1876 for the construction of an extension. Despite objections from the Postmaster as to the positioning of the new extension, close to a stable, water closets and cowyard, the room was completed in October 1881. Measuring 6.1 by 7.6 metres (20 ft × 25 ft) at a cost of £345, the room was only a temporary measure and was soon viewed as too small to operate effectively. In March 1881, before the new extension was even completed, a public meeting produced a petition from Tamworth residents calling for the erection of a new Post and Telegraph Office to replace the 1866 building and extensions.

The railway was extended to East Tamworth in 1882, which initiated a building boom as a newfound confidence settled over the town. Also in 1882, £4,000 was assigned and plans were commenced for a new office. The tender was awarded in November 1883 to J. Conlon for a cost of £4,845. Still deemed too small, two further land purchases in late 1883 were made to accommodate the planned building, which included a colonnade to both Peel and Fitzroy Streets. The Colonial Architect's Office drew up the final plans in 1884 with the tender for construction going to W. C. Cains from Sydney for £6,859. The Hon J. Norton, Postmaster General, laid the foundation stone on 23 January 1886 and the new building was occupied by the Post Office on 31 May 1886. The clock was not ready for installation at the official opening but was installed late in 1886.

In December 1870 the Post Office and Telegraph Office were combined while in December 1871 a branch of the Government Savings Bank was opened in the Post Office. In February 1900 the Telephone Exchange was opened, with 80 subscribers by 1902. The exchange went automatic in March 1939, the first country automatic exchange apart from Canberra.

During the 1960s the first major alteration was undertaken at a cost of $160,000. This work included doubling the length of the facade in Fitzroy Street with a new colonnade constructed to the ground and first floors matching the original 1886 work. The extension increased the floor space by 6.0 square metres (65 sq ft).

In 1986 a further $355,200 was spent on renovations, alterations and repairs including an increase in the public space and business area and a total refurbishment of the first floor office space and reception areas.

== Description ==
The Tamworth Post Office is a two-storey Victorian Italianate building constructed in ashlar pattern rendered brickwork, with a four-storey corner clock tower. The building is painted an apricot colour with off-white detailing and dark green window and door frames. It has a predominantly hipped corrugated iron roof behind a balustraded parapet wall that encloses the building and it is punctuated at the centre of the front-hipped roof by a rendered and painted chimney.

The tower is capped by a cast concrete cupola with iron finial at the apex, housing the striking hour bell, and it retains four clock faces to the level below. It is the dominant feature of the building and streetscape and is accessed internally via an elegant cast iron spiral stair and fixed timber ladder leading up to the clock mechanism at the third-floor level from the first-floor level. Paired narrow sash windows beneath each face light the level below.

There are three arcaded and balustraded facades fronting Peel and Fitzroy Streets and the laneway to the north. The two storey arcades comprise solid masonry elements and round arches to the ground floor with a wrought iron balustrade, and round arches supported by slender classical concrete columns to the first floor with a masonry balustrade. There is a timber boarded soffit and asphalt lined floor to the first floor verandah and a shallow barrel vaulted plaster soffit with moulded cornice and concrete tiled floor to the ground floor verandah. There is a textured soffit to the western end addition of the southern ground floor verandah.

The main addition to the Post Office is the 1966 Telephone Exchange western addition fronting Fitzroy Street, in sympathetic style and scale to the original building, comprising the western six arched bays. Roofing to this area could not be seen behind the parapet, but is presumably hipped similar to the original.

Fenestration of Tamworth Post Office is regular, with windows and doors spaced between arches of the verandahs. To the ground floor original section of the building fronting Peel Street, there are two pairs of French doors at the centre, with fanlight and arched window over each and paired, side hung windows either side with arched fanlights over, of matching proportions to the doors. The 1966 addition to Fitzroy Street has modern automatic sliding glass doors to the Post Office and modern shop windows either side.

The first-floor openings comprise French doors and modern flush doors to the original openings fronting Peel Street and to the eastern end fronting Fitzroy Street. There are false doors and smaller windows to the extension at the western end addition of the Fitzroy Street facade, all located at regular intervals between arched bays. All openings are square cut and simply detailed.

The ground floor of Tamworth Post Office comprises three main areas, including the large carpeted public retail area fronting Fitzroy Street to the west and the narrow, tiled public post boxes area on the northern side. The carpeted post office storage and sorting areas are combined with offices at the centre and there is a large, open, carpeted commercial premises fronting Peel Street, separate from the post office, with a grey/blue colour scheme.

The ground floor Australia Post retail area to the western end fronting Fitzroy Street has the standard Australia Post fitout of display wall panelling, laminated counters and carpet in the grey colour scheme. Ceilings to the ground floor are predominantly false without a cornice and set back from the outer wall fabric, or plasterboard with a coved cornice. Air conditioning vents and ducting are located throughout. Lighting consists of fluorescent tubes and large pendant lights to the verandahs.

Architraves to the ground floor appear to be original, to the original section of building fronting Peel Street and there does not appear to be any original skirting material retained. Internal doors to the largely partitioned spaces are modern. Windows to the northern wall of the commercial space have been mostly blocked, with small arched windows remaining high in the wall.

The ground floor has a series of plasterboard partitioned offices to the western side of the building occupied by the Post Office, as well as a small plasterboard office within the eastern commercial space. There is original rendered masonry wall fabric to the post office and commercial space, while the 1966 addition southern wall is a stud wall with ashlar patterned sheet lining to the exterior facade. There is one chimney breast evident to the ground floor centre of the commercial space that has been bricked in.

The later terrazzo stair to the first floor has a simple steel balustrade and is located at the start of the 1966 addition. It can be accessed from the Post Office, exterior and the commercial space. The first floor of Tamworth Post Office comprises the concrete and vinyl tiled former telephone exchange, tiled staff amenities and carpeted lunch room, storage and former offices, the front "meeting" room having sheet vinyl flooring. Excepting the staff amenities and lunchroom, the upper floor is currently vacant. Ceilings to the first floor are as for the ground floor, being suspended ceilings without cornices and later plasterboard with coved cornices. Air conditioning vents are located within the ceilings and there are banks of fluorescent lighting to the spaces, with pendant lights to the verandah.

Some original architraves are retained to the first floor original section of building; however, the rest of the first floor has modern architraves and there is a plain black modern skirting strip to the entire floor. Some of the verandah doors are original and are fixed closed, with non-original louvred fanlights. Usable doors to the verandah are modern, as are all internal doors. Walls to the first floor are rendered brick and asbestos cement sheet partitioning, with some timber and glass partitioning to the southwestern corner of the original section of building. A bricked in fireplace is located within the front "meeting" room and there are some air conditioning units fixed to walls.

Signage to the building comprises Tamworth Post Office 2340 lettering across the eastern facade below the balustraded parapet and a standard Australia Post sign to the southern facade. There are smaller signs attached to the ground floor Peel Street facade related to the commercial premises and temporary Australia Post banners are currently located below the street fronting clock faces.

Tamworth Post Office, with its prominent clock tower, is a landmark feature in the streetscape of Tamworth's Civic Centre. The building is set within a predominantly two-storey modern and historic streetscape. To the west of the Post Office is the three-storey c. 1960s–70s Telstra building abutting the Post Office addition and to the north, with a narrow laneway between, is the two-storey, classically influenced Commonwealth Bank. The Post Office site complex is fully developed, and there are no smaller associated outbuildings or structures remaining.

The hard street edges of Tamworth's Civic Precinct have been softened with landscaping including large palm trees, one located at the front corner of the Post Office, flower beds, cast iron bollards, pedestrian islands and crossings, and sympathetic "heritage" street lighting.

=== Condition ===
As of 3 August 2000, the Tamworth Post Office was in very good condition. There is some archaeological potential.

Little original internal fabric remains, excepting a few walls and the clock mechanism. The exterior is in very good condition and is intact to its original form excepting the sympathetic addition to the west, fronting Fitzroy Street. Tamworth Post Office still retains the features which make it culturally significant, including the prominent clock tower, arcaded loggia, stucco wall finish and the cast-iron spiral staircase.

=== Modifications and dates ===
Historic photographs and plans indicate that the original 1886 building comprised the corner tower, four arched bays west and seven bays to the north of the main body of the building. Records report that the clock faces were not installed until later in 1886.

Extensions were undertaken in 1966 to the Fitzroy Street facade to accommodate a telephone exchange and additional mail box facilities. These additions were extensive, but constructed in a sympathetic style and continue the essential architectural elements of the original building. The original Peel Street facade and the corner tower appear to remain as originally constructed.

Extensive internal modifications have occurred over time, including the relocation of the Post Office to the rear addition ground floor and the creation of the isolated commercial premises at the front of the building, possibly during the 1986 alterations.

Australia Post fitout and colour scheme to the retail area was installed c. 1990s.

=== Further information ===
A notable feature of Tamworth Post Office is the entire clock mechanism on the third level of the tower. It is intact, appears in excellent condition and remains manually operated, with a striking hour bell located on the level above.

Tamworth Post Office is generally in very good condition, particularly regarding the exterior. Much of the original fabric to the interior has been removed or altered; however, the current fabric appears to be in good condition.

There is some archaeological potential of the site, regarding the underfloor area of the building, in particular the extensions of the building to the west. Extensive works have occurred within the site since original construction.

== Heritage listing ==
As at 3 August 2000, Tamworth Post Office is significant at a State level for its historical associations, aesthetic qualities and social meaning.

Tamworth Post Office is also associated with the early development of the town, as it is linked with the original postal services established in 1840. The form and scale of Tamworth Post Office reflects the building boom in the town in the early 1880s. Tamworth Post Office provides evidence of the changing nature of postal and telecommunications practices in NSW, and is important for housing the first automatic telephone exchange in a country post office apart from Canberra. As such, Tamworth Post Office provides a valuable insight into the development of communications services in NSW.

Tamworth Post Office is aesthetically significant because it is a fine example of the Victorian Italianate style with Free Classical influence on the clock tower, and makes an important aesthetic contribution to the civic precinct in Tamworth. Tamworth Post Office is also associated with the Colonial Architect's Office under James Barnet, a key practitioner of the Victorian Italianate style of architecture.

Tamworth Post Office has potential to yield information regarding late nineteenth-century clock tower mechanisms and archaeological information about the previous use of the site.

Tamworth Post Office is also considered to be significant to the Tamworth community's sense of place.

Tamworth Post Office was listed on the New South Wales State Heritage Register on 22 December 2000 having satisfied the following criteria.

The place is important in demonstrating the course, or pattern, of cultural or natural history in New South Wales.

Tamworth Post Office is associated with the early development of the city, as it is linked with the original postal services established in 1840. The current Tamworth Post Office has been the centre of communications for Tamworth for over a century.

The form and scale of Tamworth Post Office also reflects the building boom and population growth that resulted from the extension of the railway line to East Tamworth in the early 1880s.

Tamworth Post Office also provides evidence of the changing nature of postal and telecommunications practices in NSW, and is important for housing the first automatic telephone exchange in a country post office apart from Canberra. As such, Tamworth Post Office provides a valuable insight into the development of communications services in NSW.

Tamworth Post Office was designed by Colonial Architect James Barnet, a key practitioner of the Victorian Italianate style of architecture. The Colonial Architect's Office under Barnet designed and maintained a number of post offices across NSW between 1865 and 1890.

The place is important in demonstrating aesthetic characteristics and/or a high degree of creative or technical achievement in New South Wales.

Tamworth Post Office is aesthetically significant because it is a fine example of the Victorian Italianate style. The clock tower also shows some Victorian Free Classical influence in the shape of the cupola.

The scale, architectural style and location of the building, along with the prominent corner clock tower, also make it a focal point defining the centre of the civic precinct of Tamworth, endowing it with landmark qualities. The scale and style of the building compares with Goulburn Post Office.

The 1966 sympathetic addition to the Fitzroy Street facade adds to the overall scale and style of the building, and is considered to contribute to the aesthetic significance of Tamworth Post Office.

Tamworth Post Office is further distinguished by its successful combination of a corner tower and two-storey round arched arcades with terminating pavilions, comparing in these respects with Forbes and Yass Post Offices.

The place has a strong or special association with a particular community or cultural group in New South Wales for social, cultural or spiritual reasons.

Tamworth Post Office is a prominent civic building and a local landmark, and has been the centre of communications for the town for over a century. It also has a long association with Tamworth's postal services. As such, it is considered to be highly significant to the Tamworth community's sense of place.

The place has potential to yield information that will contribute to an understanding of the cultural or natural history of New South Wales.

A notable feature of Tamworth Post Office is the entire clock mechanism on the third level of the tower. It is intact, appears in excellent condition and remains manually operated, with a striking hour bell located on the level above. This feature is considered to have technical significance, with the potential to yield information about the original design of clocks for public buildings in the late nineteenth century.

The site also has some potential to contain archaeological information relating to the previous use of the site and the evolution of the building and out-buildings associated with the use by the Post Office.

The place possesses uncommon, rare or endangered aspects of the cultural or natural history of New South Wales.

The scale, architectural style and prominence of Tamworth Post Office combine to make it a rare example of country post offices in NSW. The original clock mechanism, still in working order, is also considered to be a rare aspect of Tamworth Post Office.

The place is important in demonstrating the principal characteristics of a class of cultural or natural places/environments in New South Wales.

Tamworth Post Office is a strong example of the Victorian Italianate style of architecture. It is part of the group of nineteenth-century post offices in NSW designed by the Colonial Architect's Office under James Barnet.

== See also ==
- Australian non-residential architectural styles
