= Greg Taylor (public servant) =

Australian public servant

Greg Taylor AO

Secretary of the Department of Employment, Education and Training
- In office 1 March 1989 – 24 March 1993

Secretary of the Department of Primary Industries and Energy
- In office 24 March 1993 – 11 March 1996

Secretary of the Department of Industry, Science and Tourism
- In office 11 March 1996 – 29 December 1996

Personal details
- Born: Gregory Frank Taylor
- Occupation: Public servant

Gregory Frank Taylor AO is a retired Australian senior public servant; he was head of the Department of Primary Industries and Energy between 1993 and 1996. From 1997 to 2000 Taylor was executive director at the International Monetary Fund.

== Career ==
Taylor was appointed to his first Secretary role at the head of the Department of Employment, Education and Training in 1989.

In 1993, he shifted to the Department of Primary Industries and Energy, and in 1996 to the Department of Industry, Science and Tourism. He was moved on from his role at the Department of Industry, Science and Tourism by the Howard government at the end of 1996.

After leaving the Australian Public Service, Taylor was appointed an executive director at the International Monetary Fund (IMF). He started in the role just ahead of the Asian financial crisis. During his time at the IMF he represented the interests of Australia and a number of other countries, including Papua New Guinea. He completed his term on 31 October 2000.

== Awards and honours ==
In June 1995, Taylor was appointed an Officer of the Order of Australia for public service to the development of economic and social policy.

The Australian National University named the Greg Taylor Scholarships in honour of Taylor; the scholarships make research opportunities available at the Development Policy Centre to emerging scholars of Papua New Guinea and the Pacific.

Government offices
Preceded by Vince FitzGerald	Secretary of the Department of Employment, Education and Training; 1989 – 1993	Succeeded by Derek Volker
Preceded by Geoff Miller	Secretary of the Department of Primary Industries and Energy; 1993 – 1996	Succeeded by Paul Barratt
Preceded by Sandy Hollway as Secretary of the Department of Industry, Science and Technology	Secretary of the Department of Industry, Science and Tourism; 1996	Succeeded by Russell Higgins
Preceded by Helen Williams as Secretary of the Department of Tourism	Secretary of the Department of Industry, Science and Tourism; 1996	Succeeded by Russell Higgins
