= Jim Moroney (public servant) =

Australian public servant (1898–1965)

Jim Moroney CBE

Secretary of the Department of Primary Industry
- In office 15 February 1956 – October 1962

Personal details
- Born: James Vincent Moroney; 17 December 1898 Bochara, Victoria
- Died: 30 August 1965 (aged 66) Canberra, Australian Capital Territory
- Resting place: Canberra Cemetery
- Spouse: Ivy Florence Davis (m. 1939–1965)
- Occupation: Public servant

James Vincent Moroney CBE (17 December 1898 – 30 August 1965) was a senior Australian public servant and policymaker.

== Life and career ==
Jim Moroney was born on 17 December 1898 in Bochara, Victoria. For schooling, he attended St Patrick's College, Ballarat.

Moroney began his Commonwealth public service career in 1916, in Melbourne as a clerk at the Prime Minister's Department. He went on to work in the Department of Markets and Migration, the Department of Commerce and the Department of Commerce and Agriculture.

In February 1956, Moroney was appointed Secretary of the Department of Primary Industry. He stayed in the position until 1962, when he was appointed to a three year term as chairman of the Wheat Board. At the Wheat Board, under Moroney's leadership, the board successfully disposed of three record harvests and Moroney was personally responsible for some of the large wheat sale contracts.

Moroney died of cancer in Canberra on 30 August 1965, aged 66.

== Awards and honours ==
Moroney was made a Commander of the Order of the British Empire in June 1960.

Government offices
| Preceded by John Crawford | Secretary of the Department of Primary Industry; 1956–1962 | Succeeded by Alf Maiden |
