= Geoff Chapman (rugby union) =

Australian rugby union international

- Full name: Geoffrey Alexander Chapman
- Born: 2 December 1939 (age 86) Dubbo, NSW, Australia
- University: University of Sydney
- Occupation: Doctor

Rugby union career
- Position: Flanker
International career
Years	Team	Apps	(Points)
1962	Australia	3	(14)

Geoffrey Alexander Chapman (born 2 December 1939) is an Australian former rugby union international.

Born in Dubbo, Chapman attended Tamworth's Farrer Memorial Agricultural High School. While playing as a back-rower for Sydney University, he taught himself the art of goal-kicking, a skill that the team was lacking at the time.

Chapman made the Wallabies squad for the 1962 tour of New Zealand after performing well in the Wallaby trials, without having played representative rugby for New South Wales. He featured in all three Tests on tour. On his debut, a draw in Wellington, Chapman kicked all of Australia's nine points, with a last minute All Blacks penalty costing them the win. He was captain-coach of New South Wales country for the fixture against the 1966 British Lions at Manuka Oval.

A medical practitioner by profession, Chapman used to be a prominent horse trainer.

== See also ==
- List of Australia national rugby union players
