= Alf Maiden =

Australian public servant and businessman

Alf Maiden CBE

Secretary of the Department of Primary Industry
- In office 27 October 1962 – 31 December 1968

Personal details
- Born: Alfred Clement Borthwick Maiden; 21 August 1922 Taree, New South Wales
- Died: 30 July 1979 (aged 56) Toorak, Melbourne
- Spouse(s): Norma Couper Sneesby (m. 1943–1979; his death)
- Occupation: Public servant

Alfred Clement Borthwick "Alf" Maiden CBE (21 August 1922 – 30 July 1979) was a senior Australian public servant and businessman. He was Secretary of the Department of Primary Industry between October 1962 and December 1968.

== Life and career ==
Alfred Maiden was born on 21 August 1922 in Taree, New South Wales. At 16 he began a four-year program at New England University College, graduating in history and economics with honours after just three years. He joined the army in 1941, at 19, and during World War II was positioned in New Guinea.

In October 1962, Maiden was appointed Secretary of the Department of Primary Industry He resigned from the role in 1968 to become managing director of the International Wool Secretariat in London.

Alf Maiden died on 30 July 1979. His death was widely mourned, including by then Prime Minister of Australia, Malcolm Fraser—Maiden had been Secretary of the Department of Primary Industry when Fraser had been Minister of the department in 1967.

== Awards ==
Maiden was made a Commander of the Order of the British Empire in June 1965 while Secretary of the Department of Primary Industry.

Government offices
Preceded by Jim Moroney	Secretary of the Department of Primary Industry; 1962 – 1968	Succeeded by Walter Ives
