= Department of Primary Industry (1956–1974) =

Australian government department (1956–1974)

Department overview
- Formed: 11 January 1956
- Preceding Department: Department of Trade and Customs – for sugar agreements, cotton, sulphuric acid, and policy in relation to bounties Department of Commerce and Agriculture – for agricultural and pastoral industries and fisheries Department of the Interior (II) – for War service land settlement
- Dissolved: 12 June 1974
- Superseding Department: Department of Agriculture (I)
- Jurisdiction: Commonwealth of Australia
- Headquarters: Barton, Canberra
- Ministers responsible: William McMahon, Minister (1956–1958); Charles Adermann, Minister (1958–1967); Doug Anthony, Minister (1967–1971); Ian Sinclair, Minister (1971–1972); Ken Wriedt, Minister (1972–1974)
- Department executives: John Crawford, Secretary (1956); Jim Moroney, Secretary (1956–1962); Alf Maiden, Secretary (1962–1968); Walter Ives, Secretary (1968–1974)

The Department of Primary Industry was an Australian government department that existed between January 1956 and June 1974.

== Scope ==
Information about the department's functions and government funding allocation could be found in the Administrative Arrangements Orders, the annual Portfolio Budget Statements and in the department's annual reports.

At the department's creation the department was responsible for the administration of Commonwealth policy on agricultural production, including responsibility for export inspection services, fisheries development and whaling.

Among other things, the department was tasked with developing price stabilization and marketing plans for many agricultural commodities, including wheat.

== Structure ==
The department was an Australian Public Service department, staffed by officials who were responsible to the Minister for Primary Industry.
