= Department of Industry, Science and Resources (1998–2001) =

Australian government department, 1998–2001

Department overview
- Formed: 21 October 1998
- Preceding Department: Department of Primary Industries and Energy Department of Industry, Science and Tourism
- Dissolved: 26 November 2001
- Superseding Department: Department of Industry, Tourism and Resources Department of Education, Science and Training
- Jurisdiction: Commonwealth of Australia
- Headquarters: Canberra
- Employees: 1,584 (at 30 June 1999)
- Minister responsible: Nick Minchin, Minister
- Department executive: Russell Higgins, Secretary
- Website: disr.gov.au

The Department of Industry, Science and Resources was an Australian government department that existed between October 1998 and November 2001.

== Scope ==
Information about the department's functions and government funding allocation could be found in the Administrative Arrangements Orders, the annual Portfolio Budget Statements, in the department's annual reports and on the Department's website.

At its creation, the department was responsible for the following:

- Manufacturing and commerce, including industry and market development
- Science, technology and innovation, including industrial research and development
- Mineral and energy industries, including gas and petroleum, and electricity
- Export services
- Energy and resources science and research, including geoscience
- Marketing, including export promotion, of manufactures and service
- Investment promotion and facilitation
- Enterprise improvement
- Tourism industry
- Construction industry
- Facilitation of the development of service industries generally
- Bounties on the production of goods
- Offsets, to the extent not dealt with by the Department of Defence
- Patents of inventions and designs, and trade marks
- Country of origin labelling
- Weights and measures standards
- Civil space issues
- Analytical laboratory services
- Geodesy, mapping, remote sensing and land information co-ordination
- Ionospheric prediction
- Sport and recreation including industry development
- Radioactive waste management
- Administration of export controls on energy products

== Structure ==
The department was an Australian Public Service department, staffed by officials who were responsible to the Minister for Industry, Science and Resources, Nick Minchin.
