= Department of Primary Industry (1975–1987) =

Australian government department, 1975–1987

Department overview
- Formed: 22 December 1975
- Preceding Department: Department of Agriculture (I) Department of Northern Australia
- Dissolved: 24 July 1987
- Superseding Department: Department of Primary Industries and Energy
- Jurisdiction: Commonwealth of Australia
- Headquarters: Canberra
- Ministers responsible: Ian Sinclair, Minister (1975–1979); Peter Nixon, Minister (1979–1983); John Kerin, Minister (1983–1987)
- Department executives: Walter Ives, Secretary (1975–1978); Doug McKay, Secretary (1978–1980); Lindsay Duthie, Secretary (1980–1986); Geoff Miller, Secretary (1986–1987)

The Department of Primary Industry was an Australian government department that existed between December 1975 and July 1987. It was the second so-named Australian government department.

== Scope ==
Information about the department's functions and government funding allocation could be found in the Administrative Arrangements Orders, the annual Portfolio Budget Statements and in the Department's annual reports.

According to the Administrative Arrangements Order issued 5 October 1976, the Department dealt with:

- Agricultural and pastoral industries
- Fisheries
- Forestry

== Structure ==
The Department was an Australian Public Service department, staffed by officials who were responsible to the Minister for Primary Industry.
