= Department of Agriculture (Australia, 1974–75) =

Australian government department, 1974–1975

Department overview
- Formed: 12 June 1974
- Preceding Department: Department of Primary Industry (I)
- Dissolved: 22 December 1975
- Superseding Department: Department of Primary Industry (II)
- Jurisdiction: Commonwealth of Australia
- Headquarters: Barton, Canberra
- Ministers responsible: Ken Wriedt, Minister (1974–1975); Rex Patterson, Minister (1975); Ian Sinclair, Minister (1975)
- Department executive: Walter Ives, Secretary

The Department of Agriculture was an Australian government department that existed between June 1974 and December 1975.

== Scope ==
Information about the department's functions and government funding allocation could be found in the Administrative Arrangements Orders, the annual Portfolio Budget Statements and in the department's annual reports.

The matters dealt with by the department were:

- Agricultural and pastoral industries
- Fisheries
- Forestry

When the department was formed in 1974, media reported that it was "just a change in name" from the previous Department of Primary Industry. This was in fact the case; the department's name was changed at the specific request for Senator Wriedt when he became Minister of the Department—intended to recognise practice overseas and in most of Australia's states.

== Structure ==
The department was an Australian Public Service department, staffed by officials who were responsible to the Minister for Agriculture.
