= National Measurement Institute =

Australian research institute

Agency overview
- Formed: 2004
- Headquarters: Lindfield, New South Wales
- Minister responsible: Minister for Industry, Science and Technology
- Parent agency: Department of Industry, Science and Resources
- Website: www.measurement.gov.au

The National Measurement Institute (NMI) is Australia's peak measurement body responsible for biological, chemical, legal and physical measurement and is currently administered within the Australian Government's Department of Industry, Innovation and Science.

== History ==
NMI was created in 2004 from an amalgamation of the National Measurement Laboratory, itself formerly a facility within the CSIRO, with the National Standards Commission and the Australian Government Analytical Laboratories. On 1 July 2010, NMI assumed responsibility for trade measurement under a national system.

== Role ==
NMI is Australia's peak measurement organisation, responsible for the national measurement infrastructure, and for maintaining Australia's primary standards of measurement.

NMI carries out in-depth research programs and provides the legal and technical framework for disseminating measurement standards for the Australian economy. Working with industry and government, it provides measurement expertise, calibration services, chemical and biological analyses and pattern approval testing. NMI works to support Australia's standards and conformance infrastructure.

The Chief Executive Officer and the Chief Metrologist is Dr Bruce Warrington.
