= Department of Tourism (Australia) =

Australian Government department 1991–1996

Department overview
- Formed: 27 December 1991
- Preceding Department: Department of the Arts, Sport, the Environment, Tourism and Territories
- Dissolved: 11 March 1996
- Superseding Department: Department of Industry, Science and Tourism
- Jurisdiction: Commonwealth of Australia
- Headquarters: Canberra
- Ministers responsible: Alan Griffiths, Minister (1991–1993); Michael Lee, Minister (1993–1996)
- Department executives: Geoff Miller, Secretary (1991–1993); Helen Williams, Secretary (1993–1996)

The Department of Tourism was an Australian government department that existed between December 1991 and March 1996.

== History ==
The Department of Tourism was introduced in December 1991 by the newly elected Keating government, described by media at the time as a "new mini-department" with fewer than 40 staff. Prime Minister Paul Keating said at the time that giving the department Cabinet status (rather than it being a branch of the previous Department of the Arts, Sport, the Environment, Tourism and Territories) would befit the tourism industry's position as one of the fastest growing industries in Australia.

Economist Leo Jago at Curtin University argued in 2013 that establishing the department was a symbolic gesture and that the department's main role was to influence other departments, including the Department of Transport and Communications in regards to aviation reform and the Treasury regarding funding for the Australian Tourist Commission.

Inbound tourism to Australia jumped dramatically during the lifetime of the department, from 2 million visitors in 1988 to 3 million visitors in 1994.

After the Howard government was elected at the 1996 federal election, Prime Minister John Howard dismantled the department, assigning its functions to the newly created Department of Industry, Science and Tourism.

== Scope ==
Information about the department's functions and government funding allocation could be found in the Administrative Arrangements Orders, the annual Portfolio Budget Statements and in the Department's annual reports.

At its creation, the Department dealt with:

- Tourism, including the tourist industry
- International expositions and support for international conferences and special events

== Structure ==
The Department was an Australian Public Service department, staffed by officials responsible to the Minister for Tourism, initially Alan Griffiths (until March 1993) and then Michael Lee.
