= Tamworth, New South Wales =

Tamworth
- City
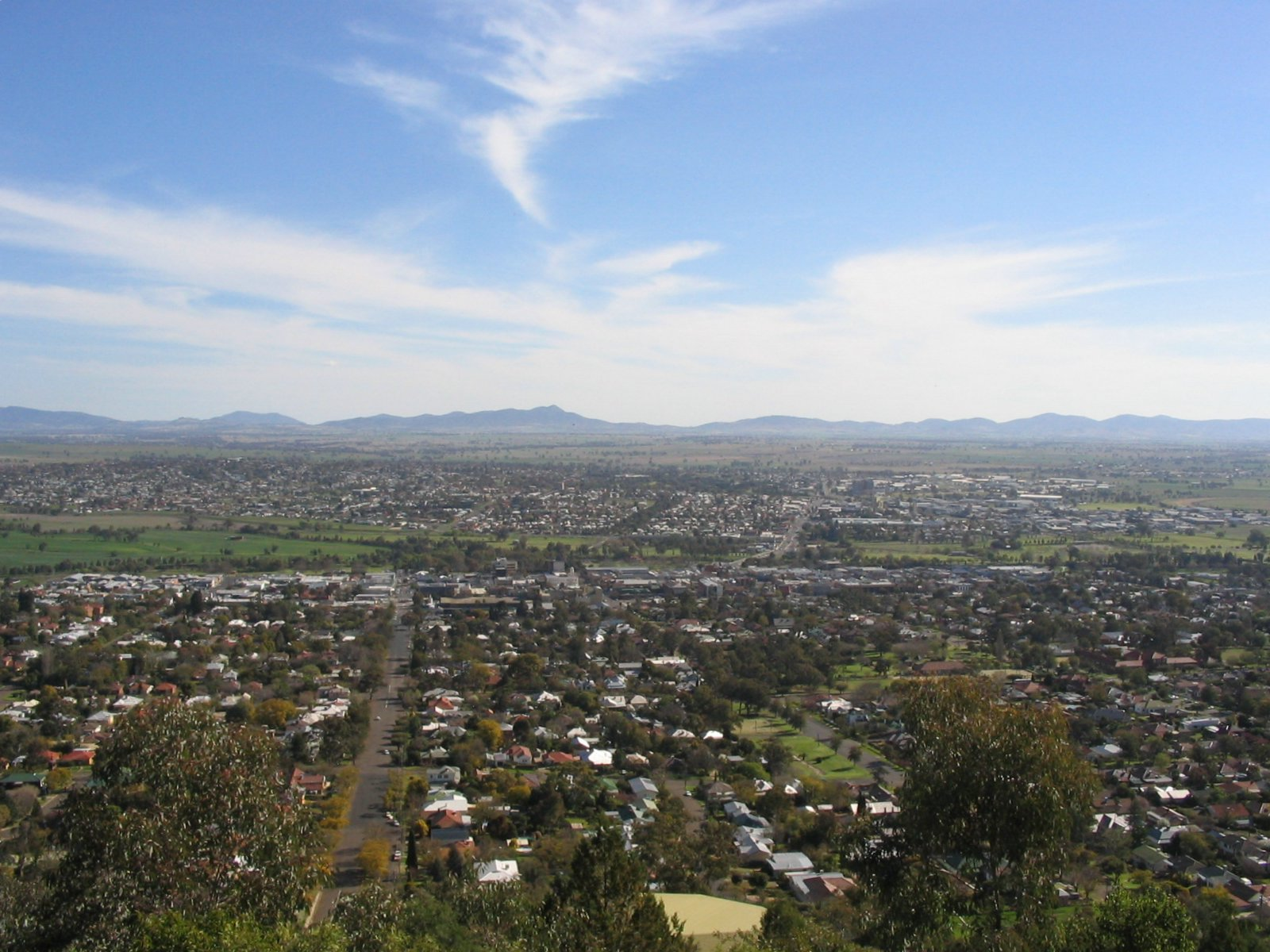
- Tamworth view from Oxley Lookout

- Coordinates: 31°05′S 150°55′E
- Country: Australia
- State: New South Wales
- Region: New England
- LGA: Tamworth Regional Council
- Location: 420 km (260 mi) from Sydney; 280 km (170 mi) from Port Macquarie; 105 km (65 mi) from Armidale; 574 km (357 mi) from Brisbane
- Established: 1818 (explored); 1850 (established); 1946 (city)

Government
  - State electorate: Tamworth
  - Federal division: New England
- Elevation: 404 m (1,325 ft)

Population
  - Total: 43,874 (2021) (34th)
- Postcode: 2340
- County: Inglis
- Mean max temp: 24.7 °C (76.5 °F)
- Mean min temp: 9.8 °C (49.6 °F)
- Annual rainfall: 636.1 mm (25.04 in)

Tamworth (/ˈtæmwəɹθ/ TAM-werth) is a major regional city and administrative centre of the north-eastern region of New South Wales, Australia. Situated on the Peel River within the local government area of the Tamworth Regional Council, it is the largest and most populated city in the region, with a population of 43,874 in 2021, making it the third largest inland city in New South Wales. Tamworth is 318 km (198 mi) from the Queensland border and is located almost midway between Brisbane and Sydney.

The city is known as the "First Town of Lights", being the first place in Australia to use electric street lights in 1888. Tamworth is also famous as the "Country Music Capital of Australia" and "Australia's answer to Nashville", annually hosting the Tamworth Country Music Festival in late January; the second-biggest country music festival in the world after Nashville. The city is recognised as the National Equine Capital of Australia because of the high number of equine events held in the city and the construction of the world-class Australian Equine and Livestock Events Centre, the biggest of its kind in the Southern Hemisphere.

== History ==
The Kamilaroi people, from whose language comes the word "budgerigar", inhabited the area before European contact. In 1818, John Oxley passed through the Peel Valley and commented, "it would be impossible to find a finer or more luxuriant country than its waters...No place in this world can afford more advantages to the industrious settler than this extensive vale". In 1831, the first sheep stations and cattle stations were formed, and in the same year, the Australian Agricultural Company was granted a lease of 127,000 hectares (310,000 acres) of land at Goonoo Goonoo, south of the present location of Tamworth, extending to present-day Calala.

In the 1830s, a company town began to develop on the Peel's southwest bank, the present site of West Tamworth. In 1850, a public town was gazetted on the opposite side of the river from the existing settlement. This town became the main town, called "Tamworth" after Tamworth, Staffordshire, represented at the time in parliament by Robert Peel. The town prospered, and was reached by the railway in 1878. The first streetlights used in Australia were commercially owned in Waratah Tasmania in 1886, but on 9 November 1888, Tamworth became the first location in Australia to have electric street lighting powered by a municipally owned power station, giving the town the title of "First Town of Light".

=== Gaol history ===
The first record of correctional facilities being established in Tamworth was on 17 December 1864 when the local Police Magistrate was appointed as the Visiting Justice at the Tamworth Gaol. A gaoler and sheriff were appointed in 1868. At the commencement of 1920, there were 11 prisoners detained. During that year, 201 prisoners were received with 183 discharged leaving 29 in prison by 31 December 1920. Almost 20 per cent of the prisoners were aged under 21 years. The Tamworth Gaol ceased to exist on 25 March 1943, and this was ratified by a proclamation from 8 April 1943.

Prior to its opening as an adult male correctional centre in 1991, the facility (known variously as the Tamworth Institution for Boys, the Tamworth Boys' Home, and Endeavour House) was a male juvenile justice centre that pre–dated the establishment of the Kariong Youth Correctional Centre which opened in September 1991.

=== Timeline ===
- 1818 – Explorer John Oxley passes through the area on his exploration mission. Names the river that now runs through the town: Peel River, after British Prime Minister Robert Peel.
- 1831 – First sheep and cattle stations, namely Joseph Brown's 'Wallamoul' and William Dangar's 'Waldoo'. The exploring expedition led by Major Mitchell visited 'Wallamoul' in December 1831 on its way to the north-west.
- 1834 – 6000 sheep of the Australian Agriculture Company were the first to be brought to the Tamworth region.
- 1851 – The white population of the village of Tamworth was 254.
- 1852 – John Barnes built the Royal Oak Hotel.
- 1861 – Population 543
- 1866 – Tamworth Mechanics' Institute opened.
- 1882 – Tamworth railway station opened.
- 1883 – Tamworth base hospital opened.
- 1888 – Power station opened and enables the beginning of electric street lighting. The first electric streetlights in Australia.
- 1918 – A pedestal is unveiled as a memorial to the discovery of Tamworth district.
- 1926 – An anchor from the HM survey ship Sealark is erected on the pedestal.
- 1935 – Radio 2TM began broadcasting. Tamworth's first radio station.
- 1946 – Proclaimed a town.
- 1947 – East-West Airlines was established in Tamworth, flying Tamworth to Sydney.
- 1947 – Institution for Boys home for criminal youth opened.
- 1973 – The first Australasian Country Music Festival was hosted in Tamworth by radio station 2TM, which has led to the extraordinary success of the Tamworth Country Music Festival that is held every year in Summer, at the end of January, a celebration that runs continuously for 11 days.
- 1984 – Tamworth Local Aboriginal Land Council incorporated under the Aboriginal Land Rights Act 1983.
- 1988 – A country music icon, the 12 m (39 ft) tall Golden Guitar is erected as a symbol of the town's country music roots.
- 1990s – The Local Council embarks on a successful campaign of urban and streetscape renewal, including the greening of Peel Street.
- 1999 – Tamworth Regional Entertainment Centre is opened.
- 2004 – A new local government area, Tamworth Regional Council, is formed from Tamworth town, Manilla Shire and parts of Parry, Nundle and Barraba Shires.
- 2006 – In December the Tamworth Regional Council voted 6 to 3 against an offer from the Federal Government to take part in a one-year trial rural refugee resettlement programme; the majority of these refugees would be Sudanese escaping civil war in their homeland. Mayor of Tamworth, James Treloar, argued that the refugees being resettled were potentially diseased and criminal. The decision resulted in national and international media attention on the town. The public outrage unleashed by his comments and the summary decision to reject the refugees forced a reversal of the bill one month later, and Tamworth took part in the resettling program.
- 2008 – The Australian Equine and Livestock Events Centre opened in September.
- 2016 – Tamworth hosted the annual City vs Country Origin rugby league match at Scully Park Regional Sporting Precinct.
- 2020 – Tamworth became the New Zealand Warriors Temporary Training and Isolation facility during the COVID-19 pandemic.

== Geography ==
Tamworth is located on the western side of the Great Dividing Range, on the banks of the Peel River, about 420 km (260 mi) north of Sydney on the New England Highway, and 280 km (170 mi) inland from Port Macquarie on the Oxley Highway. The city is situated at a narrow point on the Peel River floodplain, nestled at the base of the Wentworth Mounds, a spur of the Moonbi Range, where the Northwest Slopes rise to the Northern Tablelands. The elevation is around 400 m (1,300 ft) AHD. The Peel River runs southeast to northwest through Tamworth. The main city centre is on the northeast bank, between the river and the Wentworth Mounds, which rise to heights of 800 m (2,600 ft), towering over the city. The southwest bank is much flatter, and the city's suburbs sprawl to the south. Water for residents and the town's industry is supplied by Chaffey Dam, 44 km (27 mi) south east of the city.

Urban Tamworth occupies an area of 240.7 km^{2} (92.9 sq mi) as of 2016. The Tamworth Regional Council area encompasses the suburbs, towns, villages and rural localities of Appleby, Attunga, Banoon, Barraba (part), Barry, Bective, Bendemeer, Bithramere, Borah Creek, Bowling Alley Point, Bundarra (part), Calala, Crawney (part), Daruka, Duncans Creek, Dungowan, Duri, East Tamworth, Garoo, Garthowen, Gidley, Goonoo Goonoo, Gowrie, Gulf Creek (part), Halls Creek, Hallsville, Hanging Rock, Hillvue, Ironbark, Kentucky (part), Kingswood, Klori, Kootingal, Limbri, Lindesay, Longarm, Loomberah, Manilla, Mayvale, Moonbi, Moore Creek, Mulla Creek, Namoi River, Nemingha, New Mexico, Niangala (part), North Tamworth, Nundle, Ogunbil, Oxley Vale, Piallamore, Red Hill, Retreat, Rushes Creek, Somerton, South Tamworth, Taminda, Tamworth, Thirloene, Timbumburi, Tintinhull, Upper Horton (part), Upper Manilla, Wallamore, Warrabah, Warral, Watsons Creek, Weabonga, West Tamworth, Westdale, Wimborne, Winton, Wongo Creek, Woodsreef, Woolbrook (part) and Woolomin.

=== Climate ===
Tamworth has a subtropical climate with hot summers and relatively cool winters. It is included in the rainfall records and weather forecast region of the North West Slopes or the North West Slopes and Plains division of the Bureau of Meteorology forecasts. Under the Köppen climate classification scheme, Tamworth has a humid subtropical climate (Cfa).

Temperatures exceed 35 °C (95 °F) on around 20–25 days a year, but over the past few years have exceeded this number substantially. The average maximum temperature in summer is 33 °C (91 °F), and the average minimum approximately 18 °C (64 °F), the mean annual rainfall is 673.2 mm (26.50 in). Winters are mild and sometimes even warm by day, and cool to cold by night. Daytime temperatures average around 16–17 °C (61–63 °F) and occasionally make it to 20, and overnight minima average 3 °C (37 °F). On 12 January 2013, Tamworth recorded a new record maximum of 42.5 °C (108.5 °F), eclipsing the previous record by 0.5 of a degree, but only a year later, on 3 January 2014, this record was broken by almost 3 degrees, with a new record maximum of 45.1 °C (113.2 °F). This record has since been broken with a maximum of 45.9 °C (114.6 °F) recorded, during a significant heatwave, on 12 February 2017.

Rainfall is experienced all year round, with summer storms providing occasional heavy downpours. Tamworth's rainy season, in the early months of a new year (particularly January) can result in major flooding. Snow is very rare in Tamworth, but does occasionally occur in the surrounding higher villages such as Nundle (although far from reliable). Frosts are frequent and often severe. On 28 and 29 November 2008, Tamworth, Gunnedah, and the surrounding area received torrential rain that caused severe flooding and led to the area being declared a natural disaster area.

Climate data for Tamworth Airport
Month	Jan	Feb	Mar	Apr	May	Jun	Jul	Aug	Sep	Oct	Nov	Dec	Year
Record high °C (°F)	45.1 (113.2)	45.9 (114.6)	39.0 (102.2)	33.3 (91.9)	29.7 (85.5)	25.4 (77.7)	23.9 (75.0)	29.8 (85.6)	34.0 (93.2)	38.6 (101.5)	41.9 (107.4)	42.3 (108.1)	45.9 (114.6)
Mean daily maximum °C (°F)	32.9 (91.2)	31.7 (89.1)	29.4 (84.9)	25.6 (78.1)	20.8 (69.4)	17.1 (62.8)	16.4 (61.5)	18.4 (65.1)	22.0 (71.6)	25.6 (78.1)	28.6 (83.5)	30.6 (87.1)	24.9 (76.8)
Mean daily minimum °C (°F)	17.6 (63.7)	17.0 (62.6)	14.5 (58.1)	10.1 (50.2)	6.1 (43.0)	3.7 (38.7)	2.2 (36.0)	2.7 (36.9)	5.8 (42.4)	9.7 (49.5)	13.3 (55.9)	15.6 (60.1)	9.9 (49.8)
Record low °C (°F)	7.1 (44.8)	6.0 (42.8)	1.9 (35.4)	−0.5 (31.1)	−4.8 (23.4)	−6.0 (21.2)	−6.6 (20.1)	−6.3 (20.7)	−4.0 (24.8)	−0.3 (31.5)	2.7 (36.9)	4.6 (40.3)	−6.6 (20.1)
Average precipitation mm (inches)	60.2 (2.37)	68.4 (2.69)	49.9 (1.96)	24.3 (0.96)	29.5 (1.16)	52.7 (2.07)	40.3 (1.59)	38.1 (1.50)	43.7 (1.72)	54.6 (2.15)	81.2 (3.20)	78.2 (3.08)	631.9 (24.88)
Average precipitation days	6.7	6.9	6.8	4.0	4.6	8.6	8.2	5.9	6.7	7.8	8.3	8.9	83.4

== Demographics ==
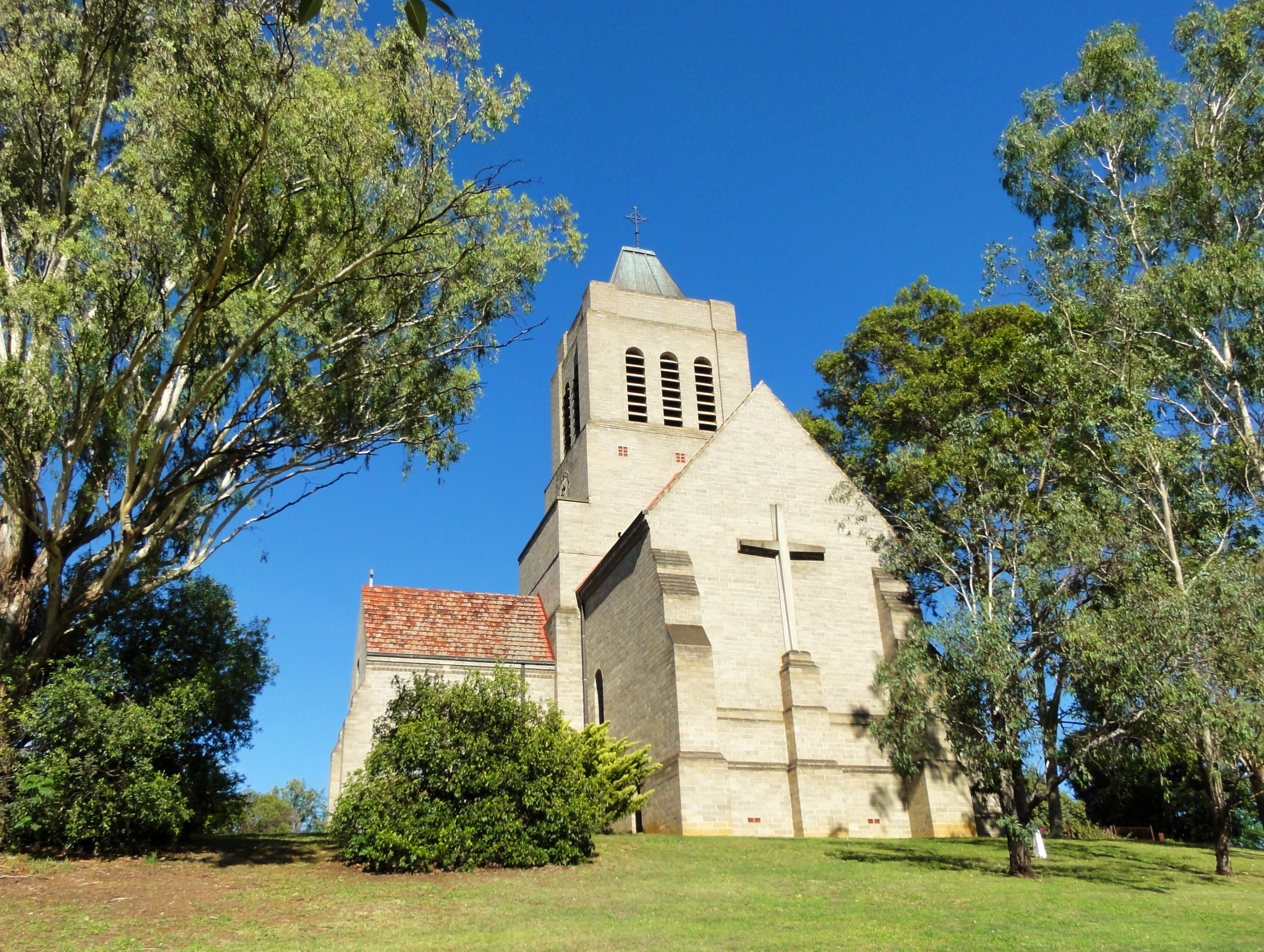
St Paul's Anglican Church, West Tamworth

According to the 2021 census of Population, 43,874 people were in Tamworth urban area.

- Aboriginal and/or Torres Strait Islander people made up 14.1% of the population.
- About 82.9% of people were born in Australia. The most common countries of birth were the Philippines 1.2%, England 1.1%, India 1.1%, Vietnam 0.8%, and New Zealand 0.7%.
- Around 85.1% of people only spoke English at home. Other languages spoken at home included Mandarin 1.0%, Vietnamese 0.8%, Tagalog 0.6%, Punjabi 0.5%, and Nepali 0.5%.
- The most common responses for religion were no religion 32.2%, Anglican 22.0%, and Catholic 21.9%.

Around 89.5% of Tamworth were working in 2021. At the 2021 census, the industry sector in Tamworth with the most employees was Hospitals (except Psychiatric Hospitals) with 6.1% of the workforce.

Historical population

Year	Pop.	±%
1921	7,264	—
1933	9,913	+36.5%
1947	12,071	+21.8%
1954	13,641	+13.0%
1961	18,984	+39.2%
1966	21,683	+14.2%
1971	24,092	+11.1%
1976	29,395	+22.0%
1981	31,779	+8.1%

Year	Pop.	±%
1986	33,321	+4.9%
1991	35,205	+5.7%
1996	35,014	−0.5%
2001	35,337	+0.9%
2006	33,475	−5.3%
2011	38,735	+15.7%
2016	41,006	+5.9%
2021	43,874	+7.0%

Source: Australian Bureau of Statistics data.

Population for Tamworth Urban Area.

View source data.

== Suburbs ==
City

- Calala
- East Tamworth
- Hills Plains
- Hillvue
- Kingswood
- Nemingha
- North Tamworth
- Oxley Vale
- South Tamworth
- Taminda (Tamworth Industrial Area)
- Tamworth Central Business District
- Westdale
- West Tamworth

Satellite suburbs

- Daruka Estate
- Duri
- Hallsville
- Kootingal
- Moore Creek
- Piallamore
- Tintinhull
- Dungowan

=== Central business district ===
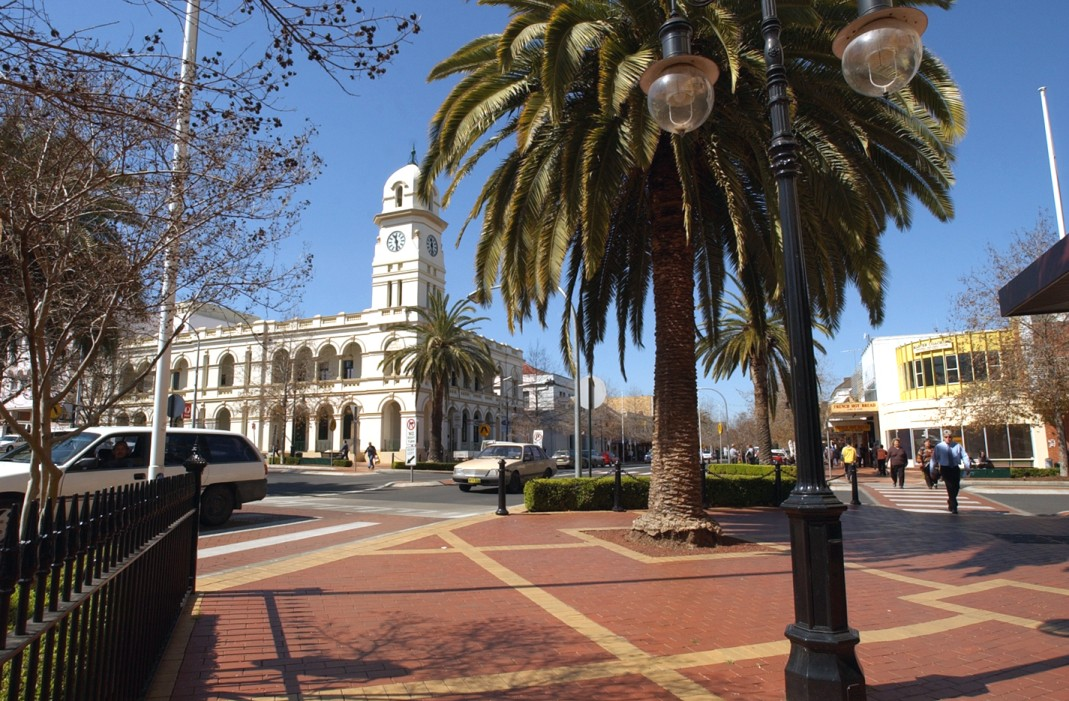
The Tamworth Post Office

The Tamworth central business district is the town centre and is located north of the Peel River. It is primarily a business area of Tamworth, with many shops, restaurants, car dealerships, as well as shopping centres and public facilities. The Tamworth Regional Council has its headquarters in Peel Street at Ray Walsh House. Bicentennial Park and number one cricket oval are also located in the suburb.

== Economy ==
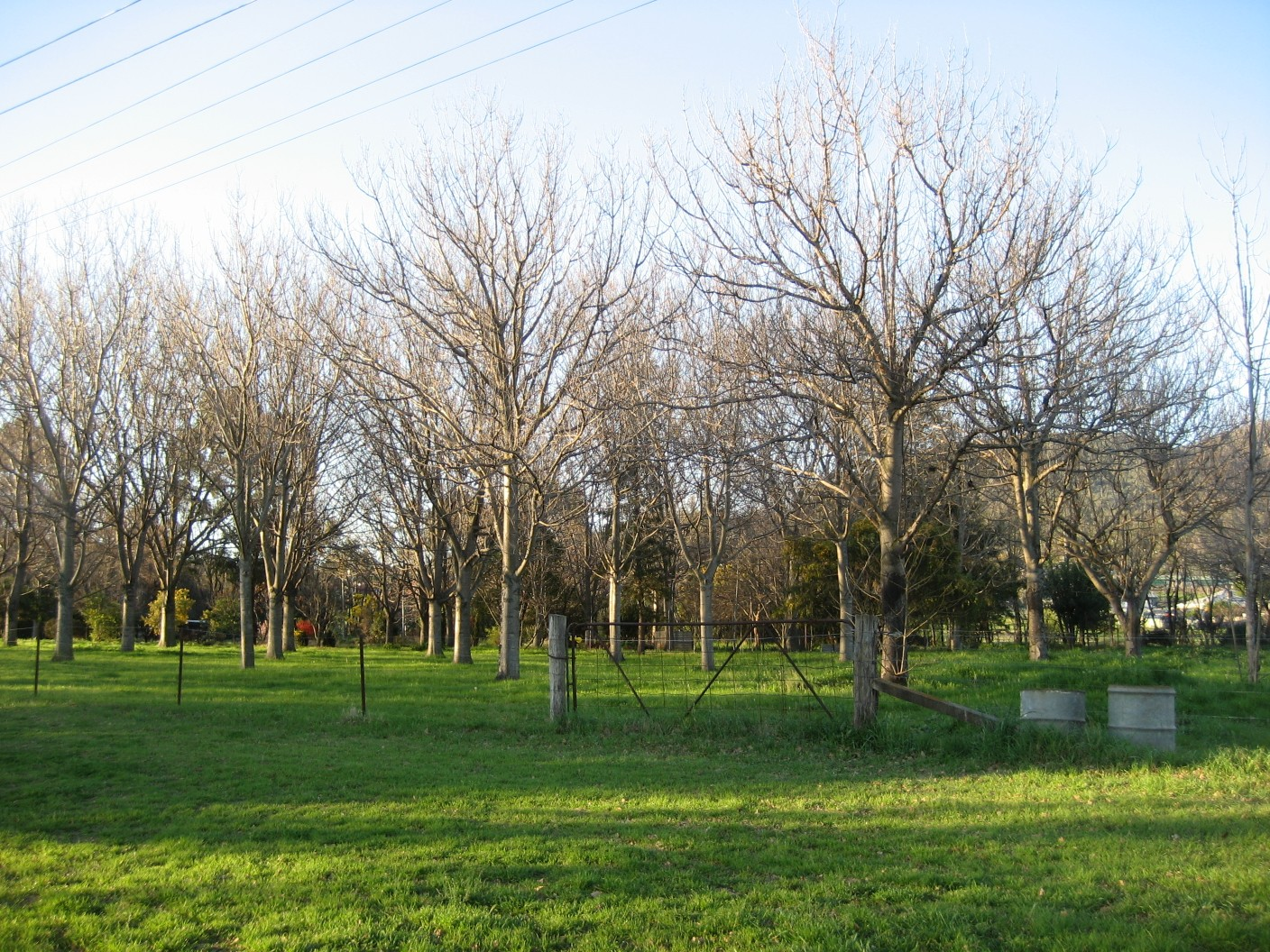
Orchard outside Tamworth during winter

Tamworth is primarily a service centre for the New England and North West regions, providing services to a population of some 200,000 plus people from the Tamworth region and satellite areas. The retail industry is the biggest employer, followed by manufacturing and health services. The industries with the most number of businesses in order are property and business services, agriculture and construction, closely followed by finance and insurance services. With a diverse economy agriculture, education, transport and aviation are major industries.

=== Aviation ===
Aviation has been a significant part of the local economy, partly due to the town's exceptionally suitable flying weather, with the former East West Airlines and Eastern Airlines having had service and maintenance bases at the Tamworth Airport. Qantaslink currently conducts heavy maintenance on its DHC8-400 fleet at its Tamworth base. The Tamworth airport is home to the former Bae systems flight training academy complex, capable of accommodating and training up to 150 students at any time. New operators are currently being sought following the withdrawal of Bae from military flight training in 2020. The Australasian Pacific Aeronautical College and New England Institute of TAFE in the town also provide aeronautical training.

=== Agriculture ===
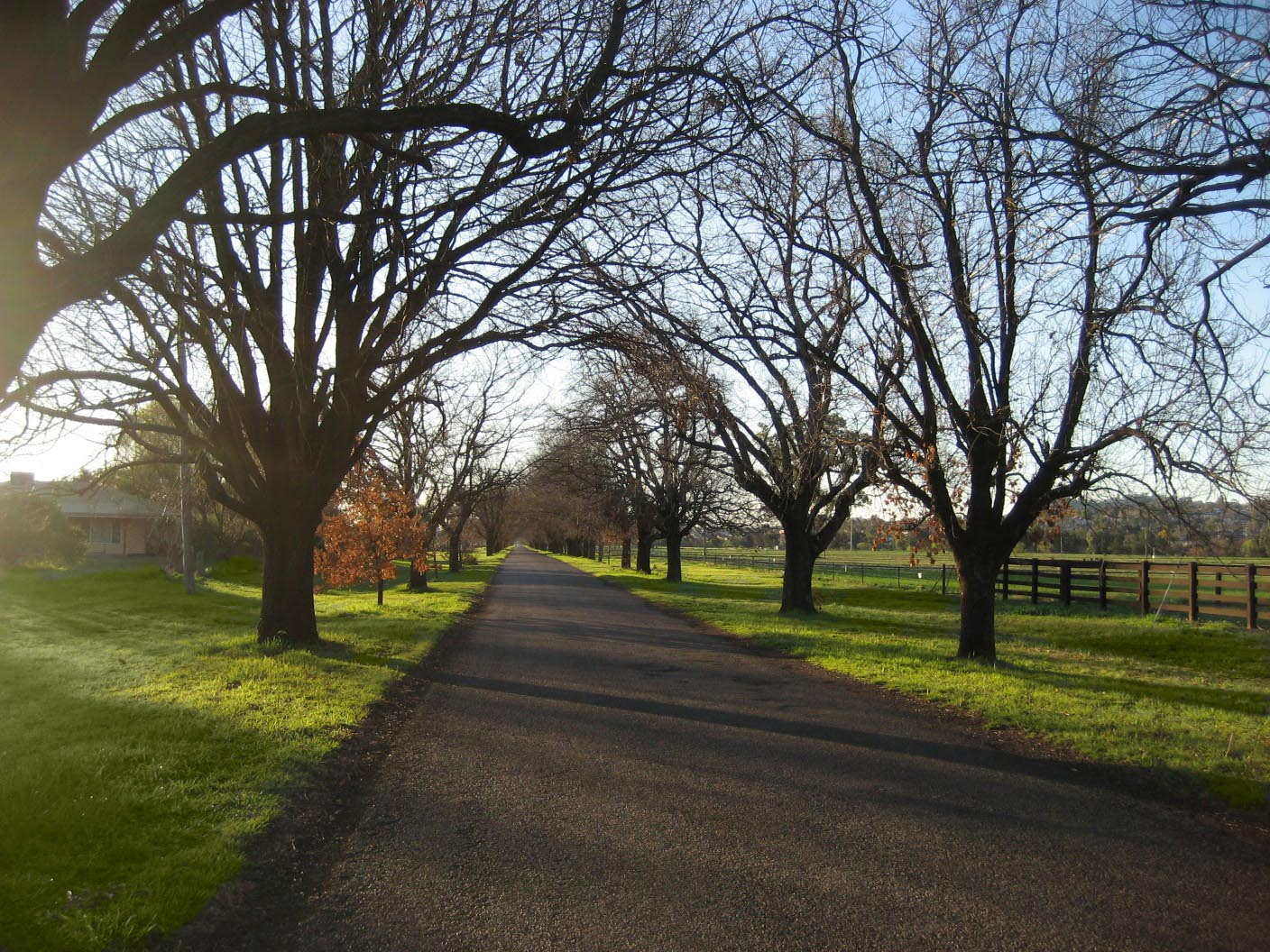
King George Avenue near the Peel River where many farms are located

Agriculture is an important industry in the Tamworth economy. An estimated 307,000 hectares (760,000 acres) of land are used for the agricultural industry, with an economic gross value of $75 million contributing to the Tamworth economy. Important agricultural activities include beef, sheep, grain, dairy, poultry and lucerne. Other agricultural areas include alpaca, buffalo, berry, fish, goat, hydroponic, nut, olive, and specialised game fowl farming, as well as wineries. Offices for the Department of Agriculture and the Department of Infrastructure, Planning and Natural Resources are located in Tamworth.

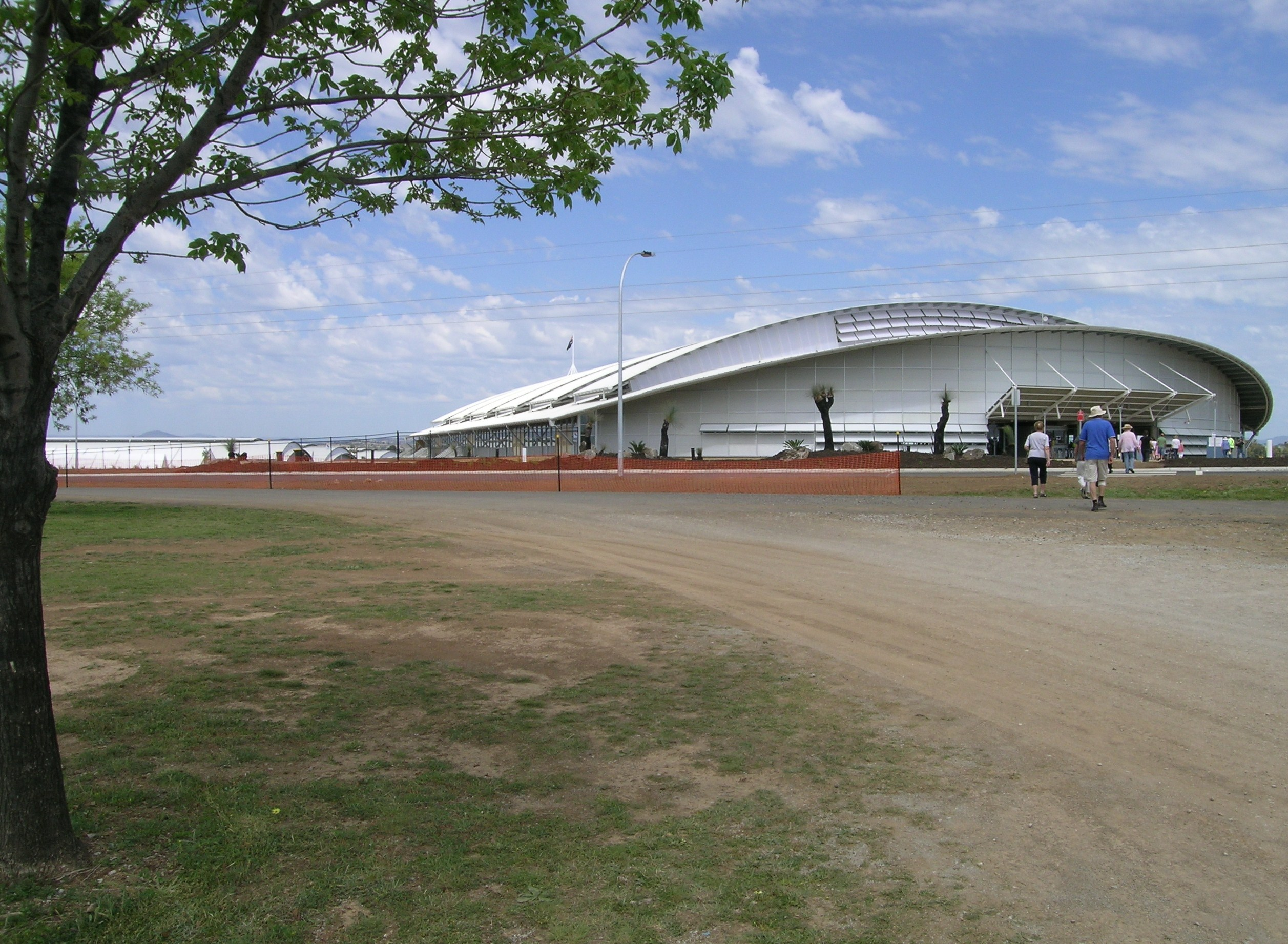
Australian National Equine Livestock Events Centre (AELEC), New England Highway, Tamworth, NSW

=== Equine and sporting horse events ===
Tamworth is recognised nationally as the sporting horse capital of Australia and is the headquarters of three major equine associations: CHA, ABCRA and AQHA. Many of the Australia's most important equine events take place in Tamworth. Various international, national and state championships are regularly held in the Tamworth district, as well as Australia's richest sporting horse event; the NCHA Futurity. Additionally, the ABCRA National Finals Rodeo occurs during the Tamworth Country Music Festival. Equine sports and their participation is very high in the Tamworth region amongst residents. The strength of the equine and sporting horse industry has resulted in hundreds of businesses and horse studs being located in the town's region.

Titles held in the town include: ABCRA National Finals and Junior National Finals, Australian Quarter Horse National Championships and Barrel Race Super Challenge, and the National Cutting Horse Association Futurity among many other events. These events were hosted at the Tamworth Showgrounds in the suburb of Taminda; however, they are now hosted at the new Australian Equine and Livestock Events Centre as of 2008. The Australian Equine and Livestock Events Centre has been built by the Tamworth Regional Council at a cost of $30 million. Construction of stage I began in June 2007 and was completed in October 2008. The centre has an indoor arena seating 3,360 people, stables for over 478 horses, a covered stud livestock-selling area with seating for 660 people and truck and camping facilities for 195 vehicles. Associations for Appaloosas horses, all breeds, Western Performance, Australian Stock Horses, Pony Clubs and cutting horses all use the centre.

=== Retail ===
Tamworth Hotel in Marius Street

Tamworth is the largest and main retail centre for the New England and North West Slopes regions of New South Wales. Retail accounts for 22.5% of the working population and is the largest employer in the town.

Peel Street is the major retail and shopping area of Tamworth and is located in the Tamworth central business district. Three blocks of Peel St were refurbished over different stages during the 1990s. There are a few hundred shops in the main street, as well as restaurants, street cafés and banks. These include a large Target department store (formerly Grace Bros).

There are many shopping centres located in Tamworth, with the majority being located in the CBD, but many are also located in various neighbourhood suburbs. Shopping centres include:

- Tamworth town Plaza is located in the CBD, with 42 shops including Coles and Kmart.
- Centrepoint Shopping Centre is a A$35 million shopping centre that was completed by Christmas 2008 behind the Tamworth Town Hall, in the CBD between the old town library and behind the speciality shops in the main street Peel St. The Centre contains a supermarket, as well as a Cinema Complex that contains five cinemas and a performing arts centre/theatre known as the Capitol Theatre that also doubles as a cinema, six restaurants, a food court and 40 speciality shops.
- The Atrium, formerly known as the Tamworth Arcade, is located in the CBD with entrances from Peel St and Kable Avenue.
- Eastpoint Shopping Centre Tamworth, located in the CBD on Peel St
- Tamworth Shopping World is located in West Tamworth along Bridge Street, with over 50 speciality shops, including a food court
- Northgate Shopping Centre is situated in North Tamworth; Coles is located inside the centre, as well as 10 speciality shops. The centre has been recently redeveloped.
- Southgate Shopping Centre in South Tamworth is home to Coles and other speciality shops. The centre was the first mall to be built in Tamworth. In 2012 Southgate undertook a redevelopment and facelift.
- Tamworth Homespace is located out at the Longyard. It is a bulk goods complex.
- Calala Court shopping complex, located in Calala, was opened in 2007. It has 10 speciality shops and a supermarket.

=== Tourism ===
Tourism is a significant industry in the Tamworth area, worth $AUD239 million annually as at December 2014, with by far the most significant draw being the annual Tamworth Country Music Festival, the biggest event of its type in Australia and the Southern Hemisphere. Other attractions include Tamworth's museums and galleries. Nearby destinations include several country towns, including Barraba, popular for birdwatching, Nundle, and Quirindi.

=== Country Music Festival ===
Tamworth is best known for hosting the annual Tamworth Country Music Festival (TCMF) over a period of 10 days from Friday to Sunday in mid to late January, sometimes including Australia Day. TCMF is the second biggest country music festival in the world. It features thousands of Australian and international country music artists performing live shows 24 hours a day. Each year, an estimated 100,000 people pass through Tamworth for the festival. Around 70,000 stay for a substantial duration, with some camping along the banks of the Peel River.

On the last Saturday of each TCMF, the Toyota Country Music Cavalcade is held in Peel Street (the main street), featuring many country music artists. The festival culminates in the prestigious Golden Guitar Awards. Tamworth otherwise honours country music by being home to the 'Big Golden Guitar', the Wax Museum, and the Hands of Fame Park.

=== Vehicle manufacturing ===
In the 1990s, Ansair established a bus bodying factory in Tamworth to body Scania and Volvo buses for Brisbane Transport and the State Transit Authority. Jakab Industries also bodied buses, ambulances and postal vans between 1973 and 2002.

== Venues ==
=== Tamworth Capitol Theatre ===
The Tamworth Capitol Theatre is fitted with a 405-seat auditorium with two levels of tiered seating, professional theatre lighting, a full sound system, dressing rooms, an orchestra pit, and fly tower, and is fully air conditioned. It is a multifunctional space for live theatre and cinema productions. It has significantly added to the existing cultural facilities in the region and provides a forum for live theatre, including dance, drama, music, educational activities, conferences and community events. During the Country Music Festival, The Capitol Theatre is host to three independent shows per day.

=== Tamworth Town Hall ===
The Tamworth Town Hall, located in the Tamworth Central Business District, is a historical building used for events, conferences and concerts. Additionally, it is commonly used for career expos, antique shows, meetings and conventions. It was built in 1934, has a proscenium stage, a gallery and a seating capacity of 1074 people.

=== Tamworth Regional Entertainment Centre ===
Tamworth Regional Entertainment Centre is located in the suburb of Hillvue. It is a multipurpose centre with a seating capacity of 5,100, and is the biggest of its kind outside the New South Wales and south-east Queensland metropolitan areas.

== Health ==
Tamworth in 2020 was dubbed Australia's "Fattest" for having the highest rate of obesity by the Australian Bureau of Statistics, 69.6% of residents undertook low or no level of exercise (top 10 highest rate of inactivity) 20.2% smoked tobacco (the highest rate in the state) and 19.6% consumed alcohol at a high risk. 23.5% of adults have high blood pressure. There has been media criticism for the amount of fast food establishments in Tamworth with the town receiving its fourth McDonalds. Hungry Jack's is also looking to add another restaurant. The council approved the restaurants because of its potential to create jobs.

== Education ==
- University of New England
- University of Newcastle
- TAFE New England
- Calrossy Anglican School
- Carinya Christian School
- Farrer Memorial Agricultural High School
- Hillvue Public School
- Liberty College
- McCarthy Catholic College
- Nemingha Public School
- Oxley High School
- Peel High School
- St Nicholas Catholic Primary School
- St Edwards Catholic Primary School
- St Joseph's Catholic Primary School
- Tamworth Public School
- Tamworth High School
- Tamworth South Public School
- Tamworth West Public School
- Westdale Public School

== Sport ==
Sport is a very important part of Tamworth culture, and over 50 different sports and recreational pursuits are participated in by the community. Many major annual and one-off sporting events are held in the town because of the wide range of facilities and venues available. There are over 180 sporting clubs in the Tamworth region and the region has several strong competitions, including basketball, cricket, football (soccer), field hockey, netball, rugby league, rugby union, and Aussie rules football. As a result, the town has produced many sportspeople, including test cricketers, Olympic shooters and hockey players, and many players in the National Rugby League. The Northern Inland Academy of Sport is one important institution in the town that has helped talented sportspeople to establish themselves "on and off the field". It was established in 1992 and has a wide range of community support.

During the Queen's Birthday long weekend in June, Tamworth hosts a Baseball tournament with teams competing from all over NSW and QLD.

=== Facilities ===
Located within the town are an athletic track, Australian football grounds, badminton courts, baseball diamonds, indoor basketball courts, indoor and outdoor cricket pitches, croquet turf, cycling (velodrome and BMX track), two 18-hole golf courses, a gymnastic centre, water bases hockey fields, the Australian Equine and Livestock Events Centre used for equine sports, eleven bowling turfs, a kart-racing track, a speedway track and a motocross track, netball courts: twelve asphalt courts, 30 grass courts and an indoor synthetic court, an inline hockey court, rugby league and union fields (nine senior fields and seven junior fields). Shooting sports have a 3 x 25 m standard pistol range, 1 x 10m air pistol range, 1 x 100m free and action pistol range; 1 x 50m service pistol range and 1 x 100m rifle range. Soccer fields include six senior fields, 8 junior fields and an indoor standard court. Two international standard softball diamonds and ten competition standard diamonds are available. Squash courts, two Olympic swimming pools and one indoor pool, tennis courts (two hardcourts, 17 synthetic courts, 8 clay courts and one indoor synthetic court), two tenpin bowling centres, 16 touch football/Oztag fields, two indoor volleyball courts and three beach courts, as well as 2 water polo competition level pools are located there.

The Oakburn Park motorsports complex built in 1996, is located 12 kilometres northwest of the city. It contains speedway and motcocross circuits and the motorcycle speedway track has hosted the New South Wales Championship on six occasions (most recently in December 2024) and the Australian Under-21 Championship four times.

=== Senior sports teams ===
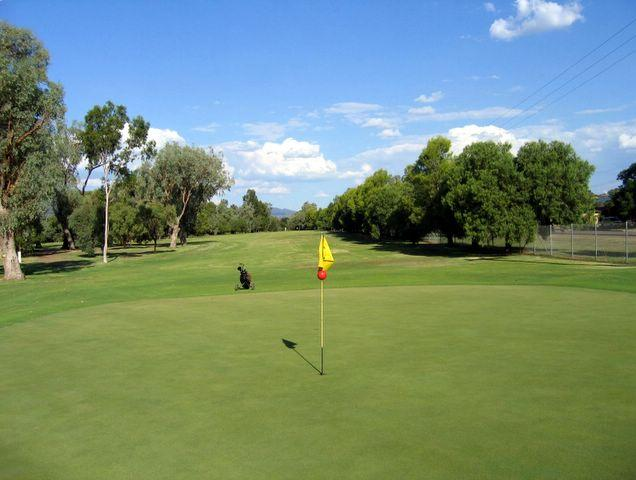
Tamworth Golf Course

Team name	Sport	Competition	Years
North Tamworth Bears	Rugby League	Group 4 Rugby League	1911
Kootingal-Moonbi Roosters	Rugby League	Group 4 Rugby League	1900s
Dungowan Cowboys	Rugby League	Group 4 Rugby League	1995
Tamworth Rugby Club	Rugby Union	New England Rugby Union	2018
Pirates Rugby Club	Rugby Union	Central North	1962
South United FC	Football (soccer)	Northern Inland Premier League	1955
Tamworth FC	Football (soccer)	Northern Inland Premier League	2008
North Companions FC	Football (soccer)	Northern Inland Premier League	1974
Kootingal Kougars FC	Football (soccer)	Tamworth District Football	1976
Oxley Vale Attunga	Football (soccer)	Northern Inland Premier League	1984
Tamworth Kangaroos	Australian rules football	AFL North West	2003
Tamworth Swans	Australian rules football	AFL North West	2003
South United Hockey Club	Hockey	Tamworth Men's Hockey	1990
Kiwi Diggers Hockey Club	Hockey	Subaru Super Sticks	1958
Razorbacks Cricket Club	Cricket	Peel Valley Bush cricket	1958

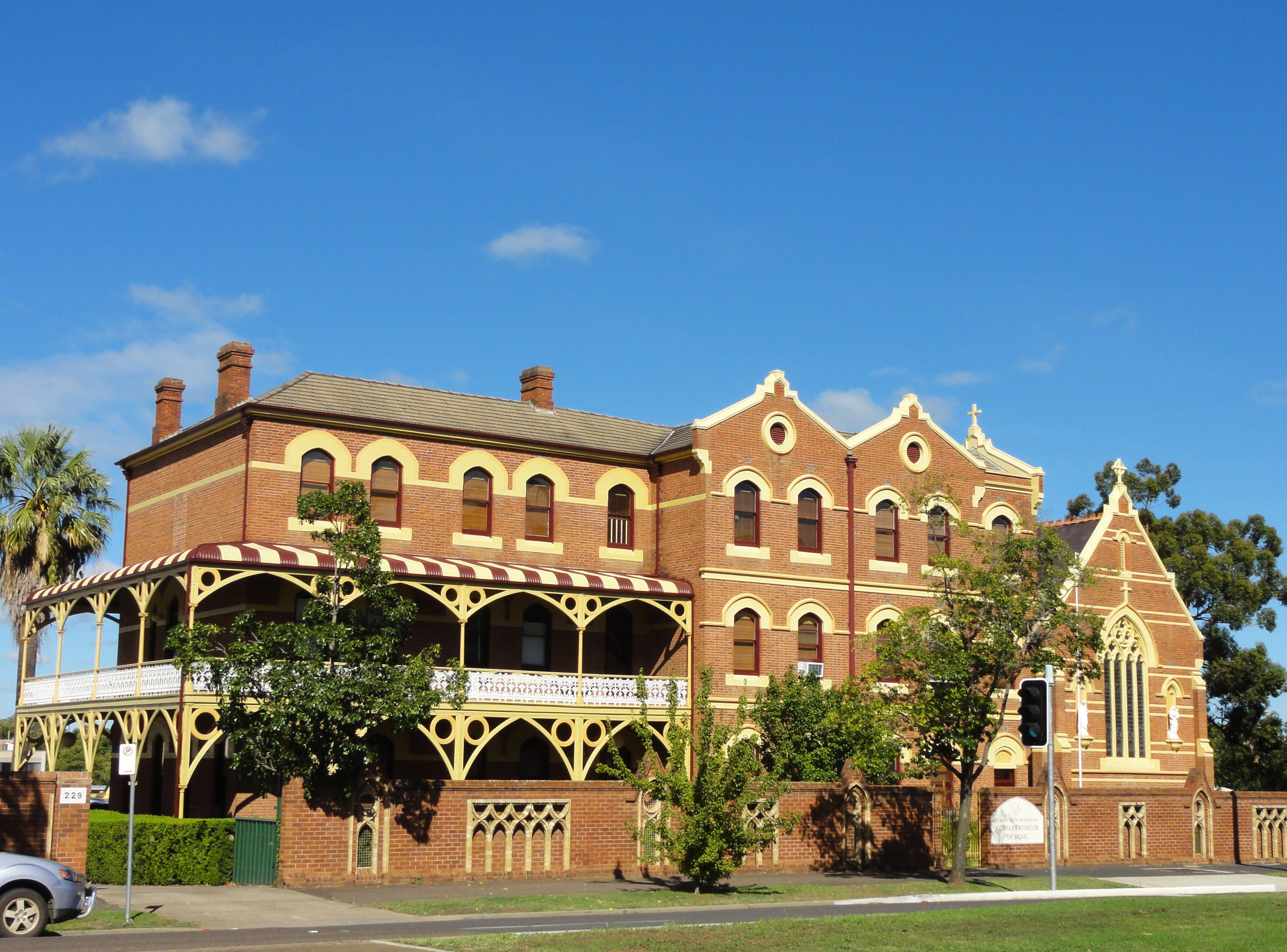
Tamworth Conservatorium of Music

== Culture and recreation ==
=== Performing arts ===
- CAPERS is a show hosted at Tamworth Regional Entertainment Centre every two years to showcase the talent of students (both primary and high school) from the North-West region public schools.
- The Northwest Dance Festival has been held various times in Tamworth at the Tamworth Regional Entertainment Centre. This includes a wide variety of dances from all the public schools in the region.
- The Tamworth Eisteddfod is held annually in May and June, with Speech and Drama, Debating, Music and Dance sections at the Tamworth Town Hall.
- The Tamworth Musical Society is an important part of the Tamworth culture, and has performed musicals such as "Grease", "Westside Story", and "Les Misérables" in October–November 2007 at the Tamworth Capitol Theatre.
- The Tamworth Regional Conservatorium of Music is another important part of the performing arts scene in Tamworth. Over 1000 students learn many instruments from experienced and qualified teachers. It is the largest regional conservatorium in the state behind Wollongong, with students ranging in age from four to 75 years old, learning over 21 different instruments.

=== Parks ===
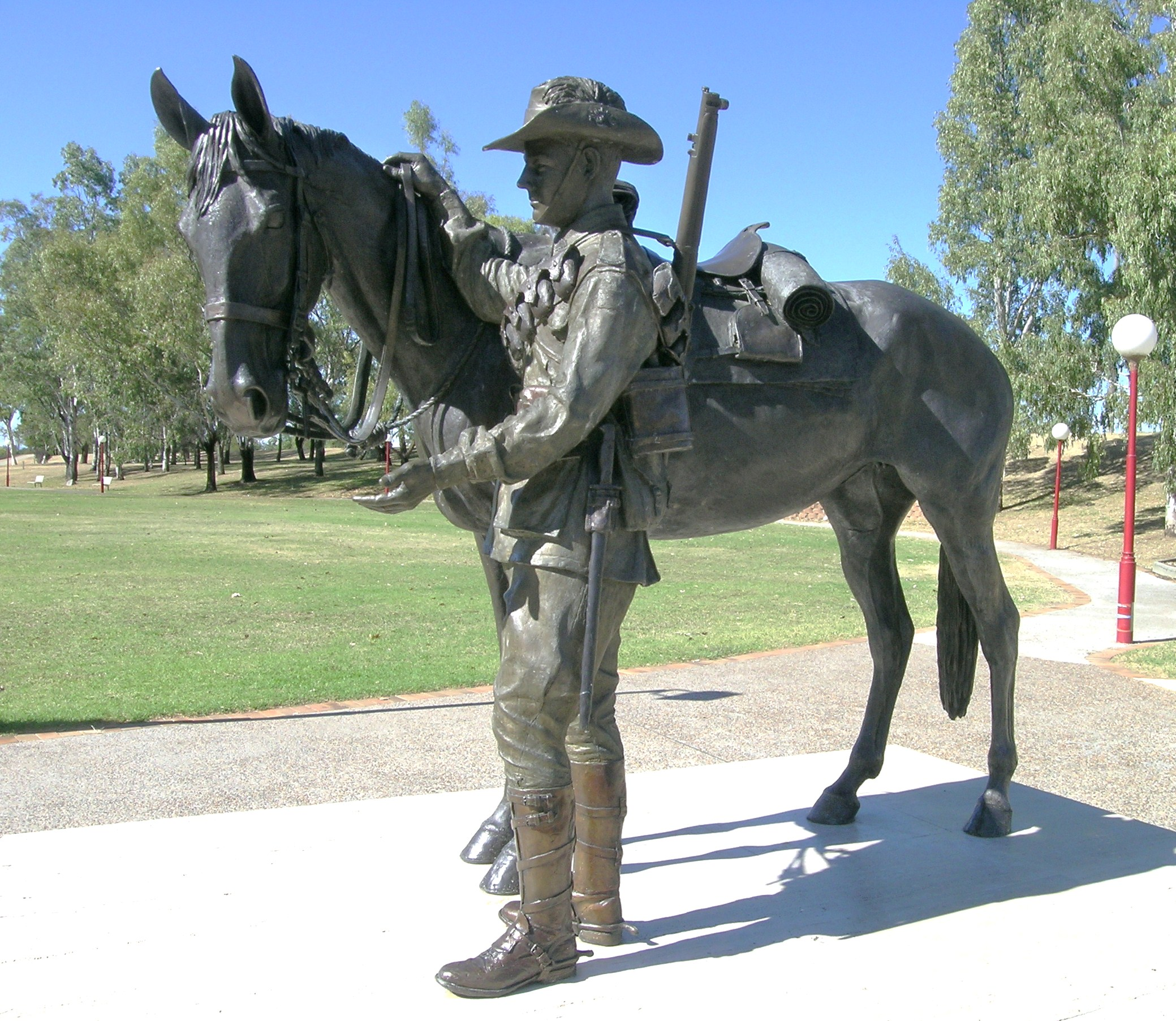
Bicentennial Park

The many important parks in the town of Tamworth include Anzac Park, Bicentennial Park and The Tamworth Regional Botanic Gardens. The botanical gardens were established in 1995 and are run by the Tamworth Regional Council. Bicentennial Park is characterised by its stagnant waters and high population of wild ducks. The gardens cover an area of 28 ha (69 acres), 5 ha (12 acres) of which has been developed. The gardens conserve the flora of the region, as well as include flora and plant displays from various parts of Australia and the world.

== Heritage listings ==
Tamworth has a number of heritage-listed sites, including:

- Fitzroy Street: Tamworth Post Office
- King George V Memorial Avenue (East): King George V Avenue of Memorial English Oaks
- Main Northern railway: Peel River railway bridge
- Main Northern railway: Tamworth railway station
- Marius Street (East): Dominican Roman Catholic Convent
- Peel Street (cnr): Tamworth Peel Barracks

The following buildings in Tamworth are listed on the now defunct Register of the National Estate:

- Hospital Main Block, built 1883
- Lands Office, Fitzroy Street, built 1889
- Post Office, Victorian Classical style, designed by Colonial Architect James Barnet, circa 1886
- Public School, Upper Street, built 1885

== Museums ==
=== Tamworth Power Station Museum ===
Tamworth was the first town in Australia to light its streets by municipally generated electricity in 1888. A larger power station was established in 1923 at a site in Marius Street, East Tamworth due to the high demand of electricity and the main building was demolished in 1982. The Tamworth Power Station Museum's purpose is to tell the story of the town's role in the development of electric street lighting, from the early days of oil lamps in 1876 and gas lamps in 1882, through to the installation of the first electric lights in November 1888. The museum has one of Australia's largest collections of early 20th century electrical appliances.

=== Powerhouse Motorcycle Museum ===
The Powerhouse Motorcycle Museum holds more than 50 motorcycles spanning from the 1950s to the 1980s. The museum specialises in Ducati, Triumph, Honda, Velocette and Laverda. The museum holds an example of the limited edition MV Agusta F4 Serie Oro.

== Churches ==
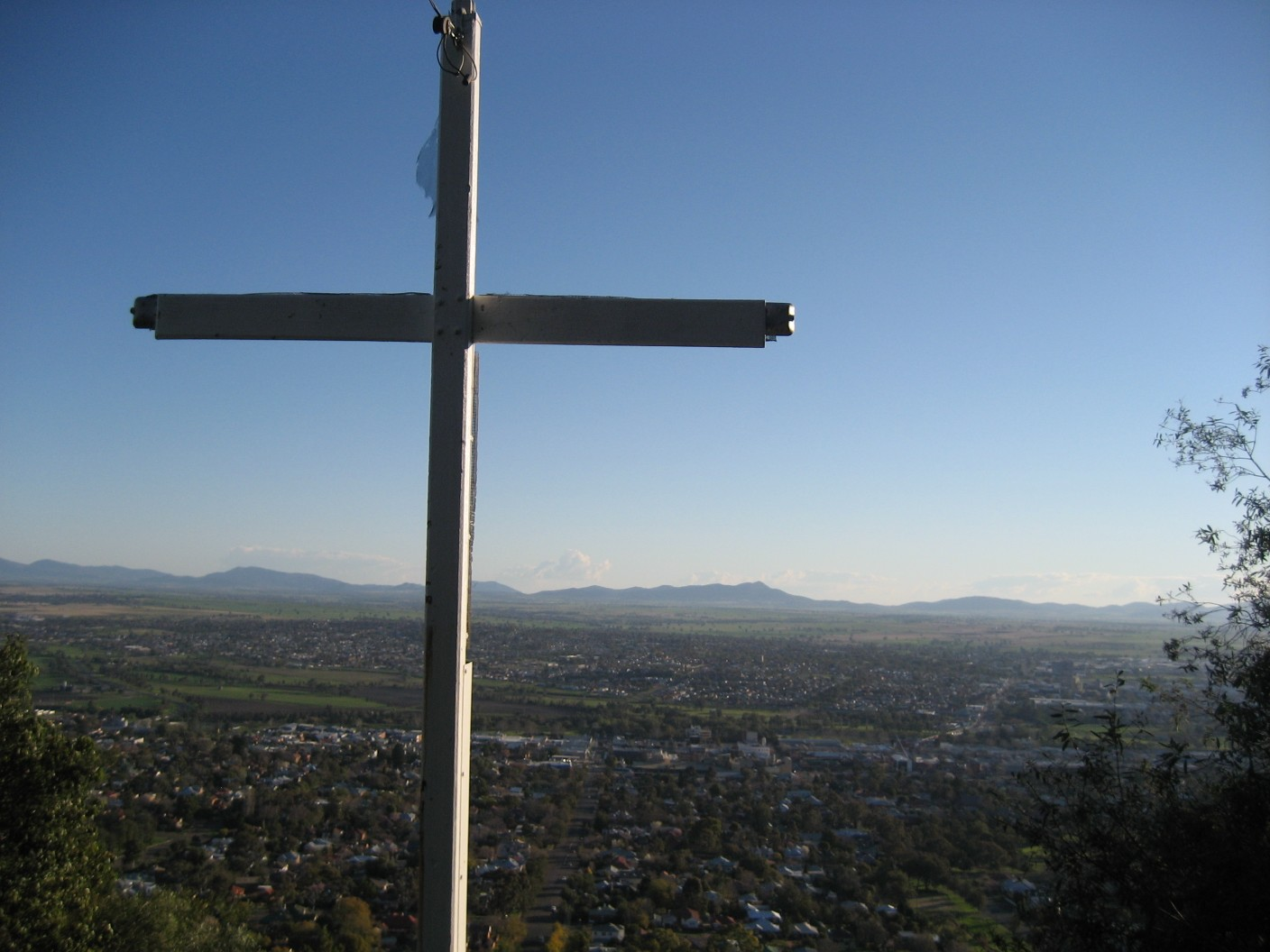
Cross of Light at Tamworth Lookout

Since 2000, the Combined Churches of Tamworth have run a free to the public festival called "Lifefest" in Bicentennial Park. The event is run on a Saturday in July in conjunction with Fusion Tamworth and with the support of Tamworth Regional Council. The family day celebrates National Thanksgiving Day and involves various stalls with free food, drinks, games, and showbags, as well as a drama presentation, music performances, and displays from police, fire brigade and ambulance personnel; 2007 attracted a crowd of a few thousand to the festival in the park.

== Media ==
Tamworth serves as the regional centre for media in the New England District. Much of the region's history is stored in its original form at the Tamworth Regional Film and Sound Archive – a volunteer organisation hosted by the Tamworth Regional Council – and their database is available online. In 1970, the town (city hall, main street, swimming pool, Hoyts drive-in, and station) and region served as the setting for the Judy vignette in the 1971 film 3 to Go.

=== Newspapers ===
- Northern Daily Leader is a long-running daily local paper (Monday to Saturday), with local and regional coverage, owned by Fairfax.
- Tamworth Times is a free weekly paper owned by Fairfax.

=== Television ===
Tamworth is served by three commercial and two public television services, each having their respective primary and multichannel services across the North West region:

- Seven (formerly branded as Prime7 and Prime Television), 7two, 7mate, 7Bravo, 7flix – Seven Network owned and operated station channels.
- Nine (NBN), 9Go!, 9Gem, 9Life – Nine Network affiliated channels, owned by WIN Corporation.
- 10, 10 Comedy, 10 Drama, Nickelodeon and News24 Regional – Owned and operated station by Network 10.
- Australian Broadcasting Corporation, ABC TV, ABC Family/ABC Kids, ABC Entertains, ABC News
- Special Broadcasting Service, SBS, SBS Viceland, SBS Food, SBS World Movies, SBS WorldWatch and NITV

Of the three main commercial networks:

- The Seven Network (formerly branded as Prime7 and Prime Television) airs a half-hour local Seven News (formerly branded as Prime7 News and Prime News) bulletin for the North West at 6pm each weeknight. It is produced from a local newsroom in the city and broadcast from studios in Canberra.
- WIN Television airs NBN News, a regional half-hour long program including opt-outs for the North West, every weeknight at 5:30pm. It is broadcast from studios in Newcastle with reporters based at a local newsroom in the city.
- Network 10 airs short local news updates throughout the day, broadcast from its Hobart studios.

Subscription television services are provided by Foxtel.

=== Radio ===
The Australian Broadcasting Corporation (ABC) operate and broadcast five radio stations:

- ABC New England North West 648 AM / 99.1 FM – part of the ABC Local Radio network
- ABC News Radio 91.7 FM
- ABC Radio National 93.9 FM / 100.7 FM
- ABC Classic 96.7 FM / 103.1 FM
- Triple J 94.7 FM / 99.9 FM
- 2TM Tamworth 1287AM – Tamworth's first radio station
- 92.9FM
- 88.9fm New England Northwest
- 96.3fm Liverpool Plains

Several other radio stations are based in the town, including 2TM, general community station 88.9 FM, Christian community radio station Radio Rhema 89.7 FM, and hit music station FM 92.9. The community radio stations both broadcast from Bald Hill. FM 92.9 and 2TM are owned by the Broadcast Operations Group, branded as the "Super Radio Network".

== Transport ==
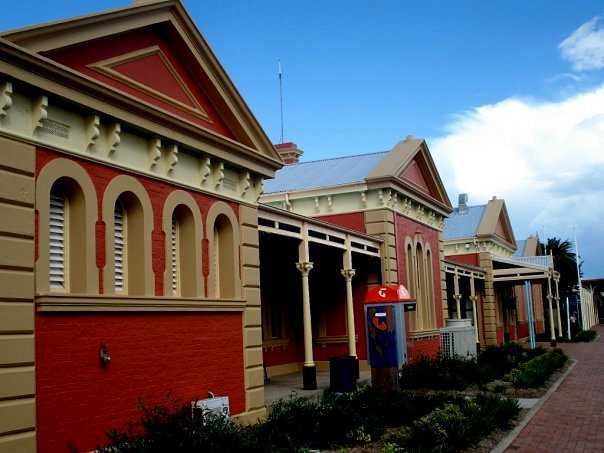
Front of Tamworth railway station

Tamworth Airport has daily flights to Sydney Airport with QantasLink, and previously by Virgin Australia. Regional carrier Fly Corporate, now known as Link Airways, began a regular service between Brisbane and Tamworth on 31 October 2016.

Tamworth railway station is situated on the Main Northern railway line. Trains no longer continue all the way to the Queensland border, but the town is still served by the NSW TrainLink Xplorer service between Sydney and Armidale, where daily coaches continue to Tenterfield.

Other NSW TrainLink coaches operate to Dubbo and Inverell. Until November 2009, Pacific National operated a regular fuel service from Sydney, carrying 30 million litres (6,600,000 imp gal; 7,900,000 US gal) of fuel a year to Tamworth and Dubbo. It was the last freight service to serve the town; in the 1980s, up to six trains a day ran.

Tamworth was served by thrice-weekly bus services to Coffs Harbour and Brisbane by New England Coaches until 2021 because of coronavirus.

Greyhound Australia stopped servicing Tamworth in 2016 citing unprofitable passenger loadings.

Local services are provided by Tamworth Buslines who also provides interurban services to nearby Quirindi (Rt 428), Manila (Rt 443) and Bendemeer (Rt 444).

== Sister cities ==
Tamworth has the following sister cities:

Country	town (and Province or State)
New Zealand	Gore
United States	Nashville, Tennessee
Japan	Sannohe, Aomori
England	Tamworth
China	Chaoyang District, Beijing
Malaysia	Kulim District

== Attractions ==
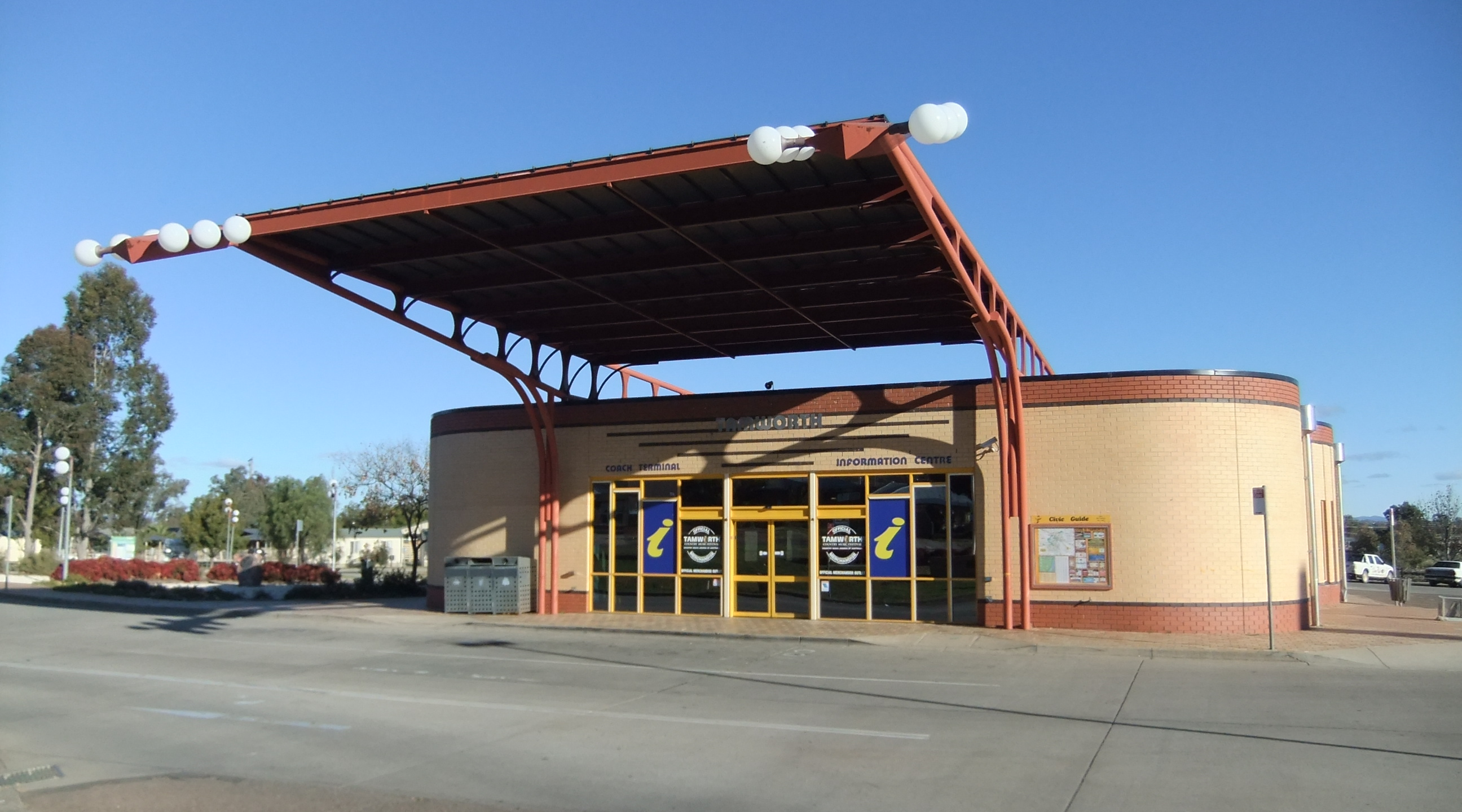
Tamworth's old Visitor Information Centre, built in the shape of a guitar.

- Calala Cottage
- Endeavour Park (Marsupial Park)
- Golden Guitar
- Oxley Park Lookout
- PowerStation Museum
- Tamworth Regional Botanic Gardens
- Tamworth Regional Gallery
- The Big Big Mac
- Wax Museum

== Military history ==
During World War II, Tamworth was the location of RAAF No.20 Inland Aircraft Fuel Depot (IAFD), completed in 1942 and closed on 14 June 1944. Usually consisting of 4 tanks, 31 fuel depots were built across Australia for the storage and supply of aircraft fuel for the RAAF and the US Army Air Forces at a total cost of £900,000 ($1,800,000).

== Notable people ==
Academic

- Stephen R Kane, associate professor of planetary astrophysics, University of California, Riverside
- Warren R Rodwell, university teacher, hostage survivor, lyricist

Arts, entertainment and media

- Peter Cousens, actor
- Mark Ferguson, TV newsreader
- Belinda Giblin, actress
- Kylie Gillies, TV presenter, co-host
- Pixie Jenkins, musician
- Ezra Lee, musician, singer, songwriter
- Tony Martin, actor
- Lawrie Minson, musician, songwriter
- Matt Moran, chef, TV personality
- Philip Quast, actor, singer
- Ivan Sen, film director, writer
- Rebecca Smart, actress
- Don Spencer, musician, author, TV presenter
- Felicity Urquhart, singer, songwriter

Politics

- Mark Coulton, politician; National Party member for the Division of Parkes
- Kevin Humphries, politician; National Party member of the NSW Legislative Assembly
- Barnaby Joyce, politician; former leader of the National Party and Deputy Prime Minister of Australia
- Andrew Wilkie, politician; independent federal member for the Division of Denison
- Tony Windsor, retired politician; independent member for the Division of New England

Sport

- Clive Barton, skeet shooter
- George Barton, shooter
- David Brooks, rugby league player
- Jamie Dwyer, hockey player
- Elton Flatley, rugby union player
- John Gleeson, cricketer
- Phil Graham, rugby league player
- Tom Green, AFL footballer
- Josh Hazlewood, cricketer
- Troy Hearfield, soccer player
- Mark Hensby, golfer
- Craig Jones, cricketer
- Nick Kay, basketballer
- Tom Learoyd-Lahrs, rugby league player
- Greg McNamara, boxer
- Ethan Parry, rugby league player
- Matt Parsons, rugby league player
- Shane Rodney, rugby league player
- Paddy Ryan, rugby union player
- Matthew Smith, hockey player
- Emelyn Starr, tennis player
- Richard Swain, rugby league player
- Peter Taylor, rugby league player
- Brad Tighe, rugby league player
- Alan Tongue, rugby league player
- Ross Warner, rugby league player
- Michael York, hockey player

== See also ==
- List of world's largest roadside attractions
