= Department of Industry, Science and Resources =

Australian government department

Department overview
- Formed: 1 July 2022
- Preceding Department: Department of Industry, Science, Energy and Resources
- Jurisdiction: Australian Government
- Headquarters: Canberra
- Ministers responsible: Madeleine King, Minister for Resources; Tim Ayres, Minister for Industry and Innovation, Minister for Science
- Department executive: Meghan Quinn, Secretary
- Child agencies: AusIndustry; Australian Building Codes Board; Australian Nuclear Science and Technology Organisation; Australian Space Agency; CSIRO; Geoscience Australia; IP Australia; Joint Accreditation System of Australia and New Zealand; National Measurement Institute; National Offshore Petroleum Safety and Environmental Management Authority; Net Zero Economy Authority; Office of the Chief Scientist
- Website: www.industry.gov.au

The Department of Industry, Science and Resources (DISR) is a department of the Australian Government established on 1 July 2022. It is responsible for advising the government on matters of industry, science and resources, and delivering policies and programs in these areas. The department is also responsible for the publication of the government's "Critical Minerals Strategy 2023–2030".

As of September 2026 there are two ministers and two assistant ministers leading the department: the Minister for Resources and Minister for Northern Australia (Madeleine King), Minister for Industry and Innovation and Minister for Science (Tim Ayres), along with the Assistant Minister for Resources (Anthony Chisholm), and the Assistant Minister for Science, Technology and the Digital Economy (Andrew Charlton).

== History ==
Formerly known as the Department of Industry, Science, Energy and Resources (DISER), the Climate Change and Energy responsibilities were transferred to the Department of Climate Change, Energy, the Environment and Water on 1 July 2022. DISR also took functions that were previously under the Department of Prime Minister and Cabinet.

== Governance and structure ==
The head of the department is the Secretary, announced as Meghan Quinn in August 2022. The department is an Australian Public Service department, staffed by officials who are responsible to the ministers.

The Chief Scientist for Australia has reported to the Minister for Science of the day since 1989.

== Scope and responsibilities ==
As outlined in the Administrative Arrangements Order made on 13 May 2025, the department is responsible for a wide range of functions including:

- Industry and manufacturing policy, excluding workplace relations and taxation matters
- Technology policy, development and diffusion and safe and responsible use
- Critical technology policy development and coordination of information and communications technology industry development
- Industrial research and development, and commercialisation
- Biotechnology, excluding gene technology regulation
- Enterprise improvement
- Business entry point management and business services coordination
- Provision of B2G and G2G authentication services
- Trade marks, plant breeders' rights and patents of inventions and designs
- Food and beverage processing industry policy
- Country of origin labelling
- Co-ordination of supply chain resilience policy
- Anti-dumping
- Weights and measures standards
- Civil space issues
- Analytical laboratory services
- Science policy
- Science engagement and awareness
- Collaborative research in science and technology
- Co-ordination of science research policy
- Commercialisation and utilisation of public sector research
- Mineral and energy resources, including oil and gas, extraction and upstream processing, remediation and decommissioning
- Administration of export controls on rough diamonds, uranium and thorium
- Mineral and energy resources research, science and technology
- Geoscience research and information services including geodesy, mapping, remote sensing, groundwater and spatial data co-ordination
- Radioactive waste management
- International science engagement
- Economy-wide digital policy and co-ordination
- Major projects facilitation
- Economic security and sovereign capability as it relates to Australian industry, science and resources
- Standards and conformance policy for domestically and internationally traded goods

== Major publications and strategies ==
Following the publication of the department's "Critical Minerals Strategy 2023–2030" in June 2023, in November 2024, the Albanese government announced its "International Partnerships in Critical Minerals" program, to provide AU$40 million in grants across eight rare-earth mining projects.

The Critical Minerals Office, a "central coordination point" in relation to Australia's critical minerals sector, is responsible for publishing policies and other documents about critical minerals.

== Minister ==
As of September 2026 there are four ministers heading the department:

- Minister for Resources and Minister for Northern Australia, Madeleine King
- Minister for Industry and Innovation and Minister for Science, Tim Ayres
- Assistant Minister for Resources, Anthony Chisholm
- Assistant Minister for Science, Technology and the Digital Economy, Andrew Charlton

== Australian Innovation Commercialisation Programs ==
The Industry Growth Program (IGP) and the National Reconstruction Fund (NRF) are two complementary Australian initiatives established under the Albanese government to support domestic industry development, manufacturing and innovative sovereign technology commercialisation.

=== Industry Growth Program ===
The Industry Growth Program is a federal grants and advisory program administered by the department. Launched in 2023 with $392 million in committed funding, the program provides matched grants to innovative small and medium enterprises pursuing commercialisation projects aligned with Australia's strategic priorities. The program offers two streams

- early commercialisation: $50,000 - $250,000 for feasibility; and
- commercialisation and growth: $100,000- $5,000,000 for scale, with a focus on scaling innovative Australian businesses into international markets.

By early 2026, the program had delivered over $200 million in matched grants across more than 100 projects.

The program was paused to new applications in May 2026.

The program has been subject to criticism over the underrepresentation of women-founded businesses among grant recipients. Despite women representing 20% of applicants, women-owned businesses received just 8.6% of approved grants. Notably, the government's definition of "women-owned" includes businesses with a single female co-founder, meaning the proportion of solely women-founded businesses receiving grants is likely significantly lower.

The Industry Growth Program is the successor to the Entrepreneurs' Programme, the federal initiative that provided early-stage advisory support to companies including Canva, now valued at over $49 billion.

==== Notable recipients ====
The programs 140 recipients span advanced manufacturing, medical technology and enabling technology including software innovations. Notable recipients include Gilmore Space Technologies which received $5 million toward liquid rocket engines for orbital launch vehicles and EMV Medical Devices which received $5 million to develop a portable brain scanner for stroke diagnosis.

Recipients also include See Me Please, a sole woman-founded accessibility technology company founded by Katie McDermott, which received $1.34 million to expand its platform connecting organisations with users with disabilities for product testing into international markets.

== See also ==
- Department of Industry, Science and Resources (1998–2001)
- List of Australian Commonwealth Government entities
