= Transport in Tasmania =

Transportation networks and infrastructure in the Australian state

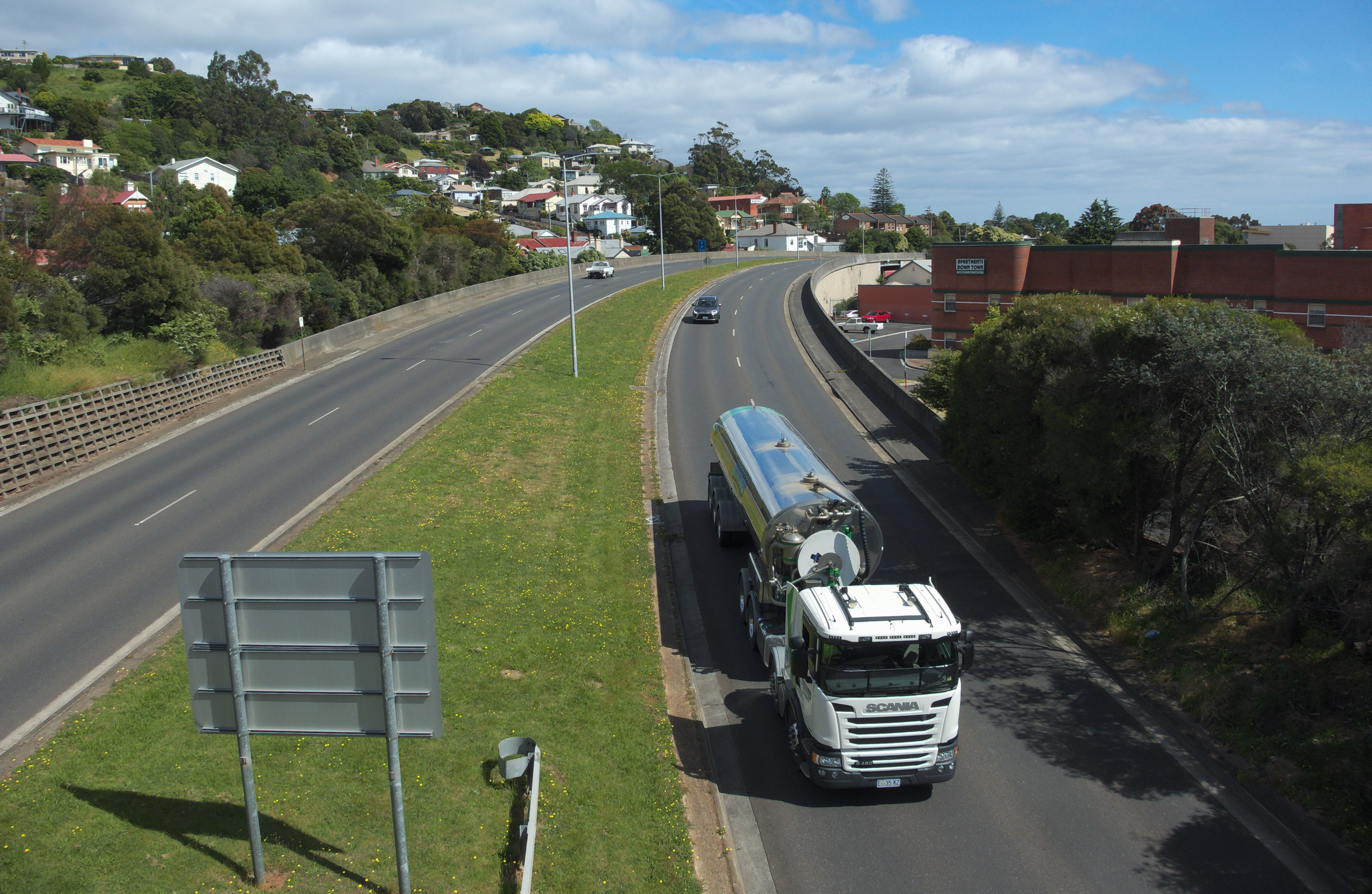
The Bass Highway connects the three cities across the north of the state.

Transport in the Australian state of Tasmania consists of road, rail, maritime, air and pipeline networks. As the sole island state of Australia, Tasmania is highly dependent on ferries and shipping with 99% of goods leaving and entering by sea. In 1976, the Tasmanian Freight Equalisation Scheme was introduced by the federal government to subsidise freight shipments in and out of the state. Ferry services include the Tasmanian government-owned Spirit of Tasmania which links to the mainland in approximately 9 -11 hours. Tasmania is the only Australian state to use roll-on/roll-off freight transport.

Convicts built Tasmania's first road in 1810. The Bass Highway connects the three northern cities of Burnie, Devonport and Launceston. Northern city Launceston is connected to the southern capital Hobart directly by the Midland Highway, and via an eastern route by the Tasman Highway. Buses are the only mode of public transport in the state. The Tasman Bridge in Hobart carries five lanes of traffic and is the longest bridge in Tasmania.

The first railway was opened in 1871. Ports in the north of Tasmania feature good connections to the rail network, however intermodal freight transport is popular. The last operational public passenger rail service in Tasmania was withdrawn in 1978. Old railways have been repurposed, for example to provide rail trails for walking and cycling.

Tasmania's first airport was established in 1914. Currently, Tasmania is served by four major domestic airports—the largest being Hobart Airport that is responsible for over 60% of air traffic to Tasmania.

The Tasmanian Gas Pipeline runs from the mainland state of Victoria and supplies natural gas.

In March 2026, the Tasmanian government announced a new body called Building Tasmania that will coordinate infrastructure for the state.

== Pre-European settlement ==
The first people arrived in Tasmania about 40,000 years ago. At that time, the Bass Strait did not exist and Tasmania was connected to Victoria by a land bridge called the Bassian Plain.

The Palawa people, Aboriginal Tasmanians, lived on the island prior to European settlement.

Foot and canoe were the methods of transport used by Aboriginal Tasmanians.

About 12,000 years ago during the ice age, Tasmania was separated from mainland Australia.

Aboriginal people transported useful stone up to 100 kilometres from its origin. In 2007, the a group organised by the Tasmanian Museum and Art Gallery made a traditional Palawa canoe based on scans of 1840s canoes in the collection. The canoe was 5.35 m in length and was made using bark from the stringybark tree.

== Maritime transport ==
Tasmania is reliant on maritime transport; 99% of freight that enters and leaves the island state is transported by ship. Tasmania's maritime transport network also includes commercial operations, including the Spirit of Tasmania, Bass Strait ferries and the Bass Island Line.

The first Tasmanian port was established in 1804 on the Derwent River. Convicts were sent to the then-Van Diemen's Land from 1812.

In 1877-85 the Pieman River goldfield on the west coast of Tasmania predominantly relied on maritime transport via the ocean due to limited land access, the only such situation across Australian goldfields. Coastal shipping linking to Launceston and Hobart was relied upon for communication, passenger transport and freight of the materials required for mining.

In January 1975, the bulk carrier Lake Illawarra collided with some of the pylons supporting the Tasman Bridge, which subsequently collapsed partially. The incident killed twelve people and cut off Hobart from its eastern suburbs across the River Derwent.

Tasmania is a shipping gateway to Antarctica. As of 2021, four round-trips from Hobart to Dumont d'Urville Station are completed during the summer.

=== Ferries ===
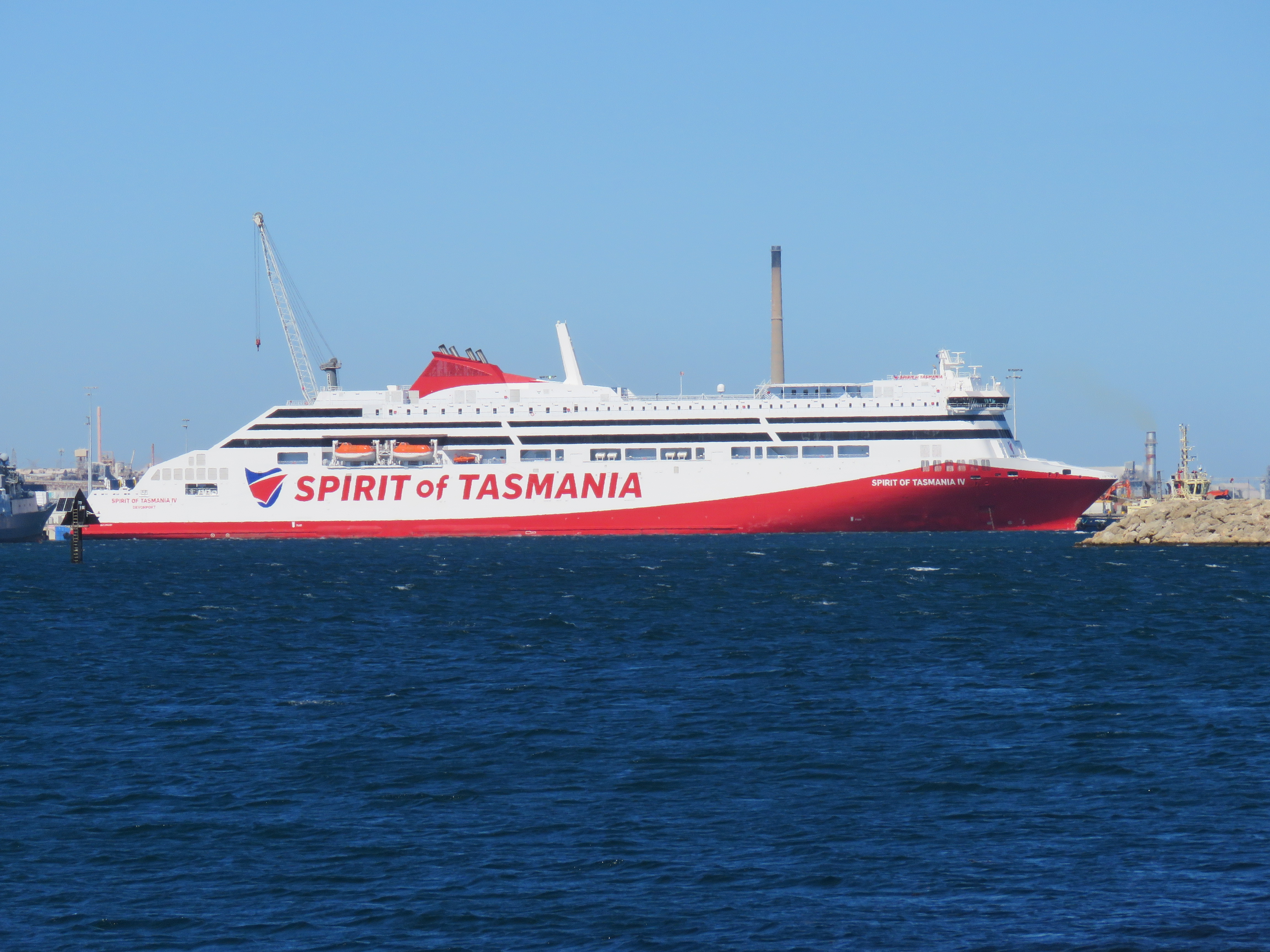
The Spirit of Tasmania IV

The first major ferry in Tasmania was James Austin's ferry, which began operating from 1817. In September 1959, the Princess of Tasmania made her maiden voyage across the Bass Strait; she was the first roll-on/roll-off diesel ferry in Australia.

The Spirit of Tasmania ferry operates across Bass Strait from Spirit Quay in Devonport to Geelong in Victoria. This is one of the major ferry services around Tasmania, served by the Spirit of Tasmania IV and Spirit of Tasmania V.

The Derwent River Ferry runs a service that crosses the mouth of the River Derwent, between the Hobart CBD and Bellerive.

The Australian ferry company SeaLink also operates a service that goes from Kettering to Bruny Island.

The "Mona Roma" is a catamaran ferry that operates between Brooke Street Pier in Sullivans Cove and the Museum of Old & New Art (MONA) in Berriedale.

=== Tasmanian Freight Equalisation Scheme ===
In 1975, Gough Whitlam announced the Tasmanian Freight Equalisation Scheme, which was established to financially help freight shippers operating between Tasmania and Mainland Australia. The program began in July 1976. In the original scheme, except in special circumstances, air cargo is excluded, as is bulk cargo. In 2016 the scheme was expanded to international markets with a mainland Australia transhipment requirement. In the 18 months to 20 June 2017 the scheme paid out $200.12 million in total, with 15.1% coming from the expansion. In 2010 dollars, the scheme had spent $2.6 billion from 1976-2011.

=== Ports and shipping ===
The first port in Tasmania was established in 1804 on the Derwent River at the locations of present-day Hobart.

Due to its geography, over 99% of Tasmania's goods that are imported and exported are delivered via shipping. The main four ports in Tasmania are Port Burnie, Port of Bell Bay, Port Devonport and Port Hobart, and there are also several other minor ports that serve the island. The operator of all these key ports is the organisation of TasPorts, operating ten ports across the island. As of 2019, no direct international freight liner services visit Tasmanian ports. Frequent services run between Melbourne on the mainland and the northern Tasmanian ports of Burnie, Devonport and Bell Bay. The shipping lines Toll, SeaRoad and TT-Line run daily services between Tasmania and Melbourne with a 55%, 24% and 21% share of trade volume respectively. Tasmania is the only place in Australia to use both traditional container and roll-on/roll-off freight transport options. Cargo destined for interstate that is time-sensitive is moved on refrigerated trailers on the Davonport to Melbourne Bass Strait ferry.

In 1988 the Tasmanian Confederation of Industries complained that it cost $72 per tonne to ship milk powder to Taiwan, whereas it cost $82 per tonne to ship it to Melbourne. In 1988, Tasmania accounted for the majority of cargo transported by coastal ships in Australia.

=== Major ports ===
Major ports in Tasmania

==== Port Burnie ====
Port Burnie is located in the northern side of the city of Burnie and was established in 1827. A deep-water port, around 5,000,000 tonnes (4,900,000 long tons; 5,500,000 short tons) of Tasmania's general freight is transited through this port yearly. It is serviced by a fleet of four tugboats.

==== Port Bell Bay ====
Port Bell Bay is a deep-water port located in the north of Tasmania. It sits right beside the Bell Bay Advanced Manufacturing Zone, which helps provide all-weather access to it. The port's industries include minerals, forestry and project cargoes. The port is serviced by five different boats, including tugboats, landing barges and pilot launch boats.

In 1995, BHP ore-carrying ship Iron Baron grounded on Hebe Reef, two kilometres from the entrance to the Tamar River. It leaked tonnes of fuel oil into the ocean. Parks and Wildlife officers were sent to northern Tasmania to care for affected birds.

==== Port Devonport ====
Port Devonport is in the centre of Devonport, near the mouth of the River Mersey. It is the docking port of the Spirit of Tasmania ferry, but primarily operates as a cargo port, with 3–4,000,000 tonnes (3.0–3,936,826.1 long tons; 3.3–4,409,245.2 short tons) of freight being transited through this port every year. It is serviced by four boats.

==== Port Hobart ====
Port Hobart is located near the centre of Hobart, near the mouth of the River Derwent. It is Australia's second oldest port, and it is a key gateway to the Antarctic and an active fishing port. It is serviced by five boats.

=== Minor ports ===
Tasmania also has a collection of minor ports that service the local communities. Historically, some minor ports include Port Arthur, Coles Bay, King Island, Flinders Island, Beauty Point, and Stanley. The privately operated Port Latta is the island's largest bulk export port, primarily iron ore from Savage River mine.

== Road transport ==
Bass Highway (east-west), Midland Highway (north-south), Tasman Highway (north-south, via eastern route)

Tasmania has a network of roads that connect multiple cities, including the major urban centres of Hobart, Devonport and Launceston. The main agency responsible for the management of arterial Tasmanian roads is Building Tasmania, while almost all local and urban roads are managed by local government. Some private roads are managed by landowners, or other government departments such as the Tasmania Parks and Wildlife Service and Sustainable Timber Tasmania.

Major roads in Tasmania include the Bass Highway, which connects the northern coastal cities of Burnie, Devonport and Launceston; the Midland Highway, which connects the north and south of the state, and the Tasman Highway, which connects both Hobart and Launceston to the east coast of the island.

The first road in Tasmania was constructed in the 1810s by convict road gangs. This road ran between Hobart and Launceston and is now named the Heritage Highway.

From 1997-98, engineering construction on roads, normalised for population, had fallen behind the national trend. The difference achieved record levels leading up to 2007-08. Bridge, railway and harbour construction also trailed behind the national levels from 1988-89 to 1997-98.

By 2001, Tasmania had applied local area speed limits of 50 km/h and 40 km/h to residential areas. Along with the ACT and the Northern Territory, Tasmania maintained a greater urban speed limit of 60 km/h whereas other Australian states moved to lower speed options.

In 2013 the State government announced $1.5 million in funding for projects to aid in protecting road pedestrians, cyclists and motorcyclists.

In 2014 the Tasmanian government funded the Cars for Communities community transport scheme. Charging passengers is governed by the TAS Passenger Transport Services Act 2011.

A 1997 survey found that that 76.1% of Tasmanians drove themselves to work or education in a motor vehicle. Reasons for not using public transport included 31.2% stating that there was no service available and 20.4% stating there were public transport difficulties, such as service infrequency, flexibility and timing.

According to the Department of State Growth, there are over 4,000 kilometres (2,500 mi) of roads in the state, as well as 1,280 bridges and major structures.

In 2022, the Department of State Growth awarded a contract to McConnell Dowell Constructors for the building of the new Bridgewater Bridge, and in June 2025, the New Bridgewater Bridge near Hobart opened to traffic which provided safer travel and better efficiency to transport. As of 2026, there is progress ongoing in dismantling the old bridge.

=== Buses ===
In October 1935, the first and only trolley bus service in Tasmania opened in Hobart, which was operated by the Hobart City Council. The fleet operated in Hobart from 1935 to 1969. Hobart's trolley bus network ceased operating in 1969. It also had a network of electric trams initiated in 1893 that ran until 1960. The trams were replaced by the Bedford bus fleet in the late 1950s and early 1960s.

In the capital, Hobart, buses are the only mode of public transport. Hobart is car-reliant with private vehicles accounting for 74% of journeys, active transport 13% and public transport 12%.

According to a 2024 report, Tasmania's public transport had fallen from being one of the most advanced in the southern hemisphere to the least advanced in Australia.

In 2025, contrary to the Tasmanian government's budget brochure promising a "safer public transport system", it deferred delivering transit officers angering the Rail, Tram and Bus Union who was concerned about bus drivers facing violence.

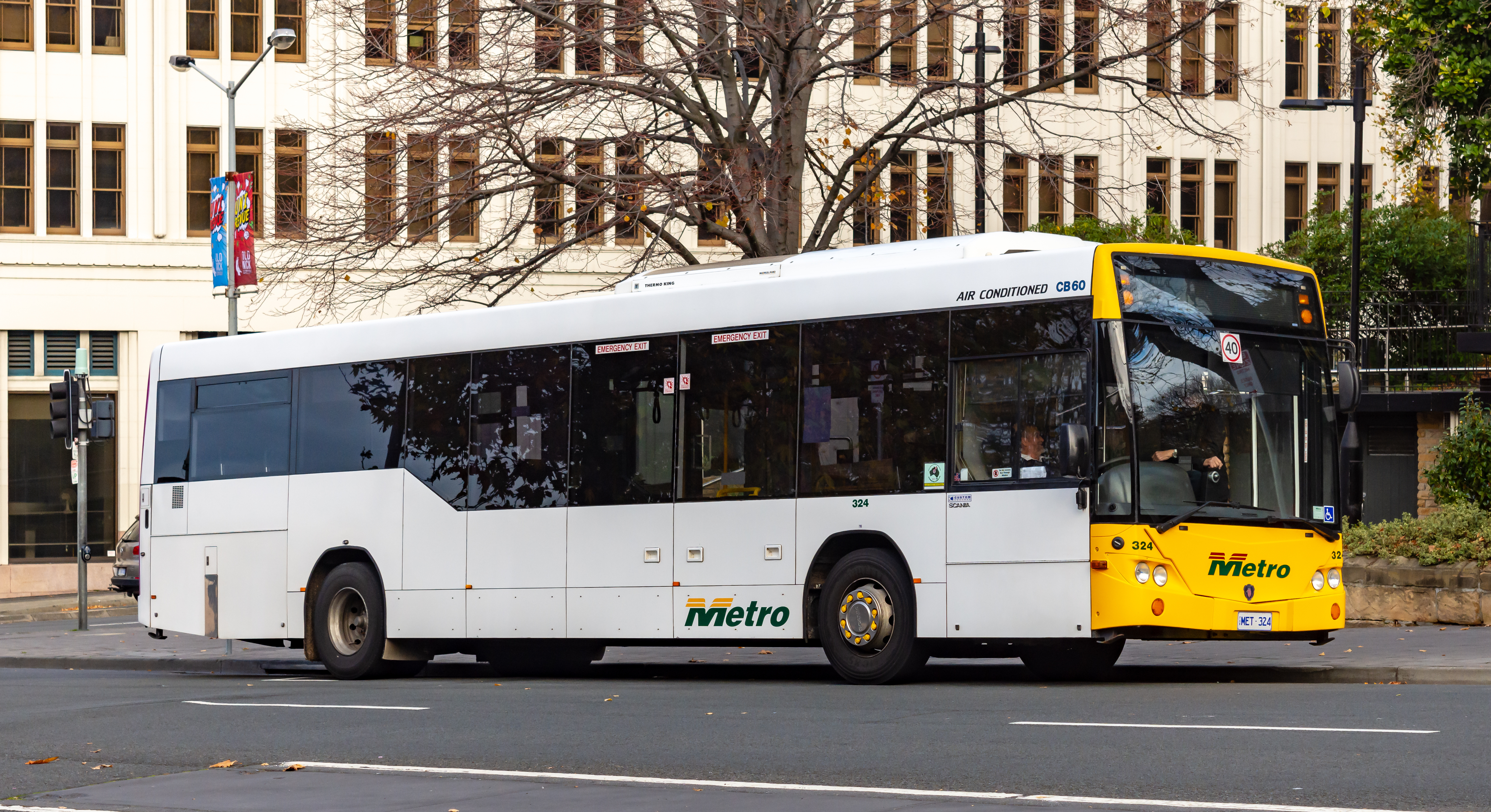
Scania K230UB bus operated by Metro Tasmania

The main operator for public transport bus services in Hobart, Launceston and Burnie is the government owned business Metro Tasmania. They use the GreenCard smart card system for fare payments.

Tassielink Transit is the bus operator for some regional services and charter services. These include services from Hobart to Geeveston and Campania to Hobart. Like Metro Tasmania, the company also uses GreenCards for faring systems.

Other private coach companies also operate bus services around regional Tasmania. Kinetic Tasmania, a subsidiary of Kinetic Group, is now the largest private bus company in Tasmania after significant acquisitions since 2021.

During the COVID-19 pandemic Tasmanians were not required to wear masks on public transport.

=== Cycling ===
Tasmania doesn't have a lot of dedicated cycle routes, but the island state does have mountain bike trails and informal bicycle trails around the state.

The first velocipede to enter Australia was in Hobart in 1827. In 1859 Edward Ackerman put out an ad for a four-wheeled velocipede for sale or hire in Launceston. In 1869 Tasmanian newspaper editorial material covering cycling spiked. Tasmania was slow to adopt safety bicycles (with equal sized wheels) and pneumatic tyres in the late nineteenth century. While on mainland Australia extended, interstate cycling trips were taking place, the island nature of Tasmania limited such activity. Off-road cycling was not reported during these times, but the undulating terrain, pleasant scenery and cooler summer climate made cycling tours desirable.

The first report of a woman cycling in Tasmania was in 1885, with The Hobart Cycling Club announcing a female member. In 1900, future Prime Minister Joseph Lyons is reported to have cycled to work from Stanley to Irishtown. In the nineteenth century there are reports of cycling disembarking vessels in Launceston and travelling along the main road to Hobart over two days.

Cycling allowed individuals to cover distances greater than that normally achieved by walking and had social and economic impacts. For example shearers from Longford on the mainland in Victoria took boats across the Bass Strait followed by trains to inland Tasmania. They then used bicycles to get to various sheep stations.

In 2012 Hobart spent only 99c per resident on bicycle infrastructure, the lowest per capita of any Australian capital city according to a Greens alderman. Adelaide was spending $97.85 per resident at that time.

In 2017, new road laws were introduced that require drivers to, in 60 km/h or less zones, to pass cyclists with at least 1 m separation, and in higher speed zones to pass with at least 1.5 m separation.

In 2018 a Hobart intercity cycleway, developed the Macquarie Point Development Corporation, was opened, costing $700,000. It was extended between the waterfront and the Queens Domain in 2019. It was partially demolished for remediation works for a new connector road and service infrastructure in mid-2020, and closed in July 2020 for safety reasons.

In 2020 $1.5 million in works to improve cycling facilities and safety along the West Tamar Highway commenced.

During the emergence of e-bikes in 2019, a spokesperson from the Tasmanian Renewable Energy Alliance commented that while Tasmania could become zero carbon-emitting electricity generator due to hydro, transport pollution was a large challenge. An e-bike tour operator said that transport network planning focussed on bikes, such as bike lanes and designated carriageways, was needed to encourage their adoption.

== Rail transport ==
The first railway in Tasmania was opened on 10 February 1871, spanning from Launceston to Deloraine.

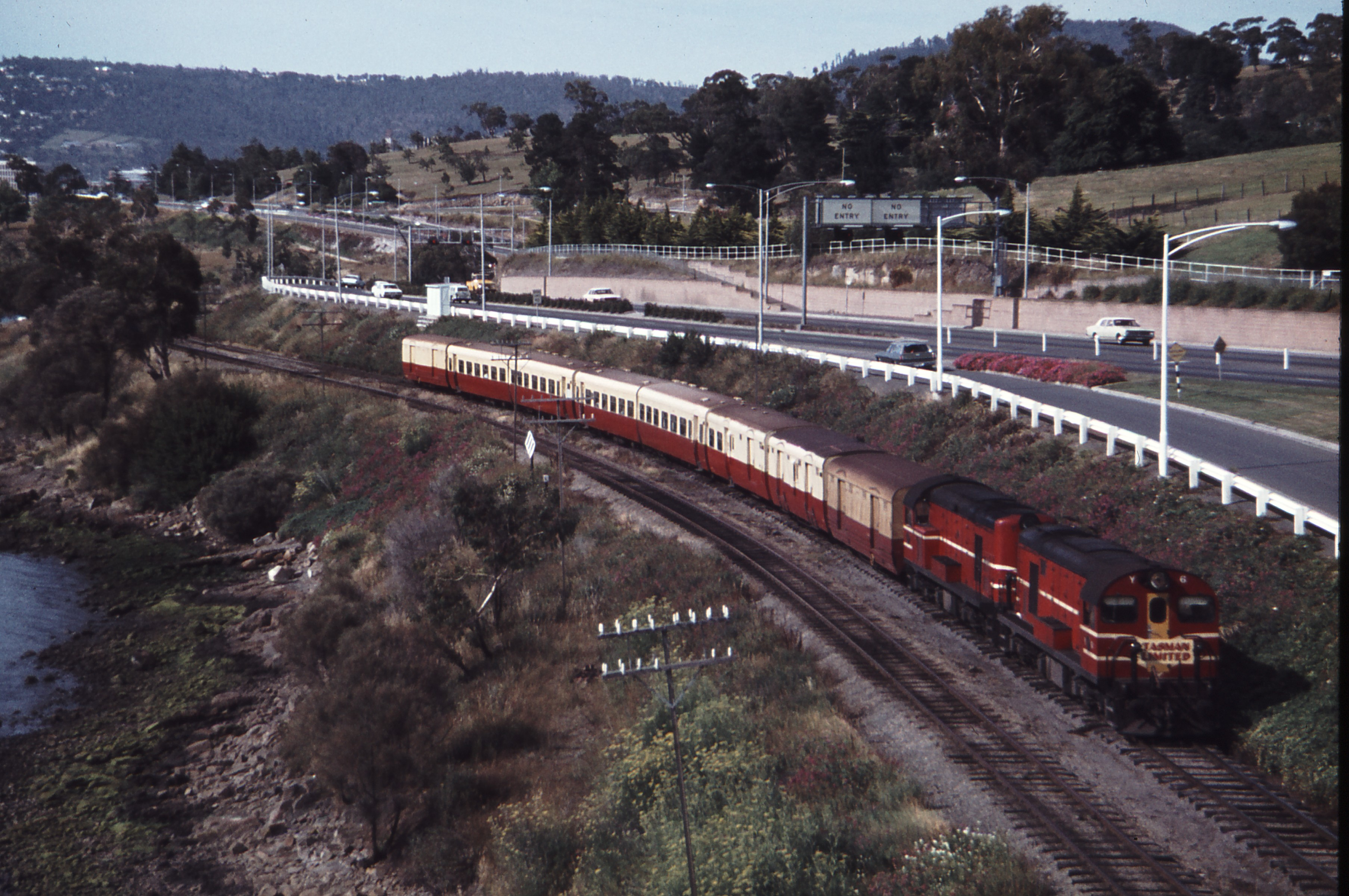
The Tasman Limited at Hobart, 1974

In 1836, a wooden "convict railway" was constructed from Oakwood to Taranna, which carried freight and passengers hauled by convicts. This was one of the first "railed ways" in Australia at that time.

On 10 February 1871, the first official railway in Tasmania opened, with it operated by the Launceston and Western Railway Company, and spanning from Launceston to Deloraine.

Launceston introduced a tramway network in 1911 that operated until 1952.

Due to no physical land connections, Tasmania has no interstate rail links. Due to the low population, only 300 km separating the north from the south of the island and outdated rail lines and trains, road is the preferred mode for non-bulk transport within the state.

Ports in the north of Tasmania feature good connections to the rail network, but trading relationships and low freight volumes have led to strong competition and excess intermodal transport.

In 2003, 15% of the 21.3 million tonnes of Tasmanian freight was transported by rail. In 2005, 50% of total freight was timber products.

The railways in Tasmania are primarily operated by the government company Tasrail, but was previously operated by the Tasmanian Government Railways (TGR). The whole Tasmanian rail network is in 1,067 millimetres (42.0 in) narrow gauge, with 611 kilometres (380 mi) of operational railway. Tasmania selected narrow gauge railways as to save on the construction cost in mountainous terrain, much like Indonesia and Japan and New Zealand.

The federal Labor government of 1972-75 extended Australian National Railways by taking over Tasmania's non-urban railways.

There are no operational public passenger rail services in Tasmania, with the last services withdrawing operation in 1978, after the growing popularity of cars. Minor passenger railways exist but serve primarily tourists, including the diesel and steam West Coast Wilderness Railway and the Don River Railway.

In 2009, the Tasmanian government purchased the little-used privatised rail network.

The last major passenger service was Tasman Limited, run by the Tasmanian Government Railways. All of the operational rail lines as of June 2026 are only serviced by freight and cargo trains running between ports and freight hubs.

Repurposing old railways, including as rail trails for walking and cycling, has been considered throughout Tasmania. For example, a 500 m section of the rail line from New Norfolk to past Maydena owned by TasRail was licenced to the Derwent Valley Railway. A licence was also granted to a tour operator offering self-powered rail bikes. Other uses for sections of the line were considered by Derwent Valley Council.

There are 2 tunnels and 355 bridges in the Tasmanian rail network.

== Air transport ==
Primary, regional and samller regional airports in Tasmania

The first airport in Tasmania was a landing ground at Elwick Racecourse, which was established on 12 September 1914.

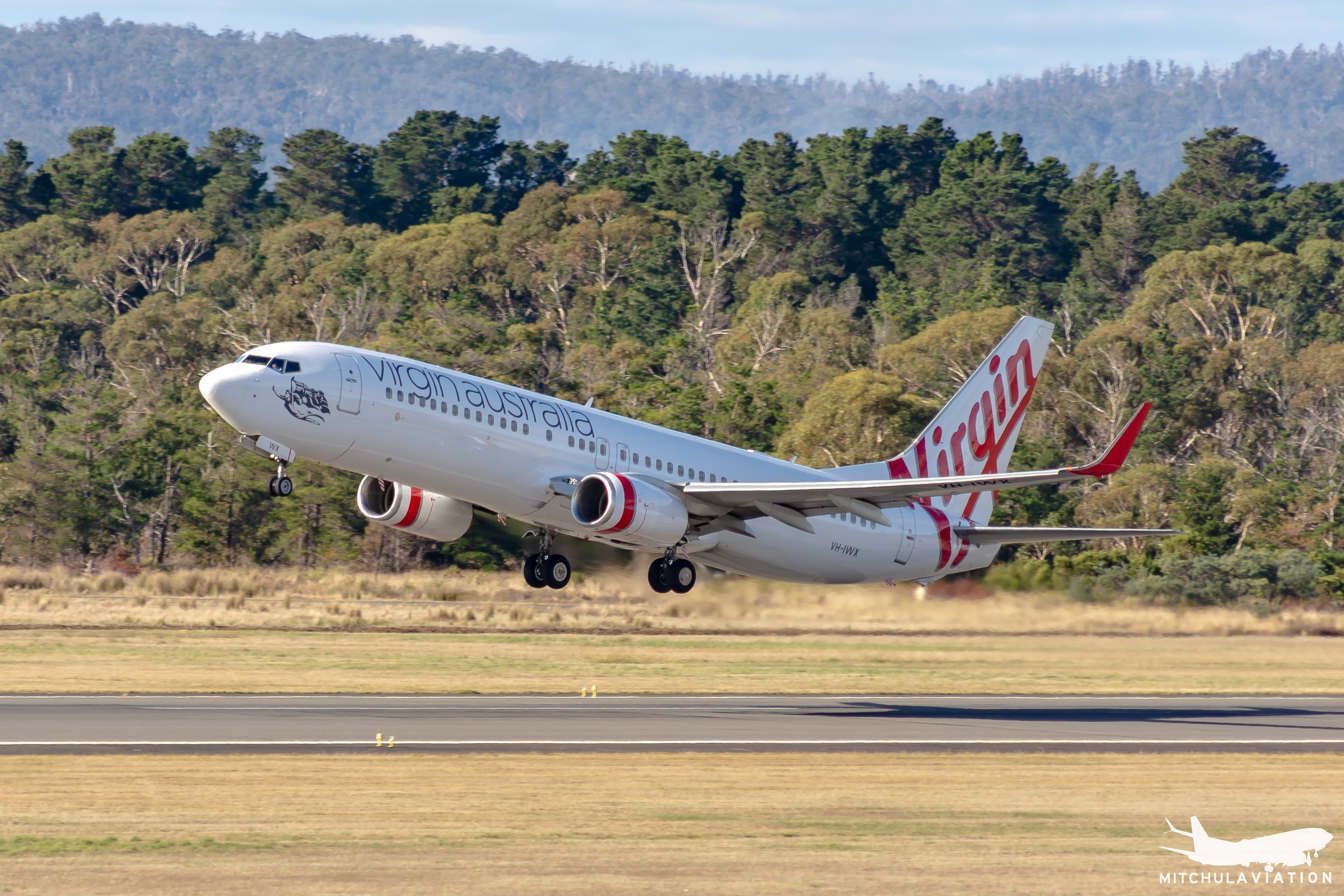
A Boeing 737-8 landing at Hobart International Airport

Tasmania has four major domestic airports operating regular passenger travel, and a number of regional airports. Hobart Airport is the largest airport in Tasmania, responsible for over 60% of air traffic to Tasmania, and 2.18 million passengers in 2015. Launceston Airport is the next largest, serving 1.28 million passengers in 2016. These major airports are supported by the two other major regional airports, Devonport and Burnie Airport, and smaller regional airports at Flinders Island and King Island. Hyper local airports at Smithton, Strahan, St Helens, Queenstown and Bruny Island primarily serve leisure, charter and tourism flights.

=== Primary airports ===
Hobart Airport is served by Qantas, Virgin Australia, Link Airways, Jetstar, and Air New Zealand with routine flights from mainland Australia.

Launceston Airport is served primarily by Qantas, Jetstar and Virgin Australia, but some services are served by Sharp Airlines.

=== Regional airports ===
Devonport Airport is only served by Qantas and Rex Airlines.

Burnie Airport is also served by Qantas and Rex Airlines, but there are also occasional services from Sharp Airlines.

== Pipelines ==
Tasmania has a number of local pipelines around Launceston, Hobart, Wynyard, Burnie, Bridgewater and Longford, but the primary one is the Tasmanian Gas Pipeline (TGP), which connects the island state with Victoria. The TGP was established in 2002 and is the first major pipeline in Tasmania.

The TGP stretches for 740 kilometres (460 mi), starting at Longford in Victoria, going under the Bass Strait, then connecting with Bell Bay, Rosevale, Devonport, Burnie, Port Latta, Launceston, Jericho and Bridgewater. The pipeline supports around $1B worth of economic output, and it supplies natural gas to Tasmania.

== Tourist targeted transport ==
Tourist targeted transport in Tasmania mainly consists of touring companies and the Spirit of Tasmania. In the 2020s, the Tasmanian Government delivered a support package to boost tourist transport, which included subsiding passenger fares and individual support packages for touring companies.

== Future developments ==
=== Spirit of Tasmania ferries ===
In April 2021, Rauma Marine Constructions in Rauma, Finland signed a contract with Spirit of Tasmania for the construction of the new Spirit of Tasmania IV and Spirit of Tasmania V ships. The ships are planned to replace the Spirit of Tasmania I and Spirit of Tasmania II and would have a more modern design and advanced technology.

=== Tasmanian Urban Passenger Transport Framework ===
The Tasmanian Urban Passenger Transport Framework (TUPTF) was announced in 2010 with the aim to reduce greenhouse gas emissions by 60% by 2050, expanding transport networks in urban areas, increase travel reliability, make communities more active and ensure land use decisions made by the Tasmanian Government support transport systems.

=== Tasmanian Walk, Wheel, Ride Strategy ===
The Tasmanian Walk, Wheel, Ride Strategy was aimed to increase and improve active transport in the island state. This is supported by improving footpaths, bicycle routes and existing infrastructure.

=== Rapid Bus Network ===
In February 2026, the Tasmanian Government commenced with the $860M plan to build a rapid bus network in south-eastern Tasmania after approximately a year of delays. Exact routes and stations were not disclosed but it is thought to go north to Claremont, east to Glebe Hill and south to Blackman's Bay.

== Records ==
=== Bridges ===
The longest bridge in Tasmania is the Tasman Bridge, with a total length of 1,395 metres (4,577 ft). It is also the longest prestressed concrete bridge in Australia.

The oldest bridge in Tasmania is Richmond Bridge, which was built in 1823 by convicts.

=== Tunnels ===
The longest tunnel in Tasmania is the Rhyndaston Tunnel, which is a rail tunnel 955 metres (3,133 ft) long.

== See also ==
- Transport in Australia — Transportation systems in the whole country
- Transport in New South Wales — Transport systems in another Australian state
