= Black Spot Program =

Australian Government road safety program

- Product type: Road safety program
- Current owner: Australian Government
- Country: Australia
- Introduced: 1990–91

The Black Spot Program is a road safety program run by the Australian Government to fix dangerous roads by treating road locations where a large number of motor vehicle collisions have occurred. The program was first introduced for a three-year period starting in 1990. Funding was stopped in 1993, but the program was re-started in 1996. Several audits and evaluations of the program have been conducted over the years. Program expenditure in 2016–17 was A$125 million.

== Program aims and funding ==
The Black Spot Program is aimed at reducing road crash injuries and fatalities through targeting the locations where crashes have occurred for treatments. Treatments include introducing roundabouts to black spot intersections, altering traffic flow directions, realigning intersections, and introducing new traffic signals.

== History of the program ==
The Black Spot program was initially established under the Hawke government as a three-year initiative to run from 1990–91. The Government had plans to spend $110 million on improving safety at more than 1,000 sites, including intersections and bridges, over the three-year period to 30 June 1993. At the time, the program was administered by the Department of Transport and Communications.

The Keating government did not renew the program in their 1993 Budget, prompting criticism from then Shadow Minister for Transport John Sharp.

The program was reintroduced in 1996, following the election of the Howard government, and a 1995 evaluation of the program by the Bureau of Transport Economics. Administration of the program from 1996 to 1998 was the responsibility of the Department of Transport and Regional Development, which was succeeded by the Department of Transport and Regional Services (DOTARS) in October 1998, the Department of Infrastructure, Transport, Regional Development and Local Government in December 2007, the Department of Infrastructure and Transport in September 2010, the Department of Infrastructure and Regional Development in September 2013, and the Department of Infrastructure, Regional Development and Cities in December 2017.

== Audits and evaluations ==
The first evaluation of the Black Spot program was in 1995, by the Bureau of Transport Economics. The evaluation was based on a sample of 254 projects and found that the program had generated returns of around $4 to the Australian economy for every dollar spent.

In 2001, the Bureau released its second evaluation of the program, which found that overall the Black Spot Program had been highly effective in reducing casualty crashes—calculating an urban benefit-cost ratio of over 18, and a regional benefit-cost ratio of around 10.

When the Australian National Audit Office audited DOTARS' administration of the program in 2006–07, it made nine recommendations, including three addressing governance arrangements and six focused on addressing shortcomings it had identified in program administration.

A third evaluation by the Bureau of Infrastructure, Transport and Regional Economics in 2012 covered 1599 black spot projects, and found that on average each project was estimated to be saving 1.7 reported crashes.

== Annual program expenditure ==
Annual program expenditure has historically been reported in the administering department's annual report:

Year	Expenditure A$ million	Notes
2000–01	$41.182	
2001–02	$48.8	
2002–03	$44.5	
2003–04	$44.5	
2004–05	$44.5	
2005–06	$44.5	
2006–07	$41.6	
2007–08	$37.3	
2008–09	$145	
2009–10	$113.6	
2010–11	$50.4	
2011–12	$65.2	
2012–13	$63.8	
2013–14	$64.5	
2014–15	$53.5	
2015–16	$126.5	
2016–17	$125	
