= Visual Obsession =

Company

- Area served: Australia
- Website: www.visualobsession.com.au

Visual Obsession is a multimedia company operating in the city of Cairns, Australia since 1989.

Visual Obsession is notable for its work on several key projects, including Tourism Tropical Tablelands, South Burdekin Water Board, and Cairns Flecker Botanic Gardens, and the Department of Infrastructure and Transport.

Visual Obsession also worked with Yarrabah teacher Jason Evert on his award-winning Digital Dreaming project.
