= Accident blackspot =

Road section with high concentration of collisions

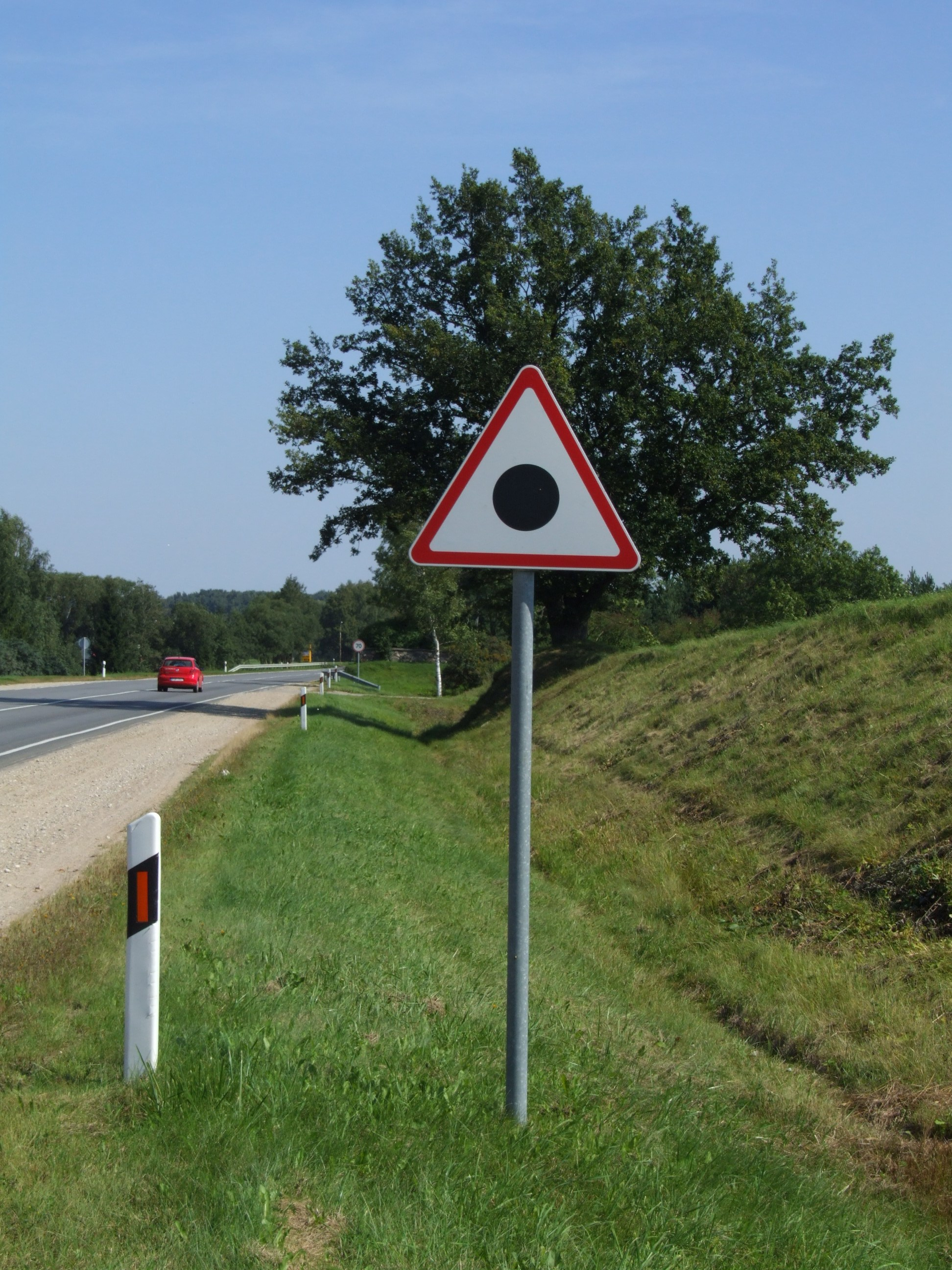
Traffic sign used in some countries (here, Lithuania) to warn of an accident blackspot

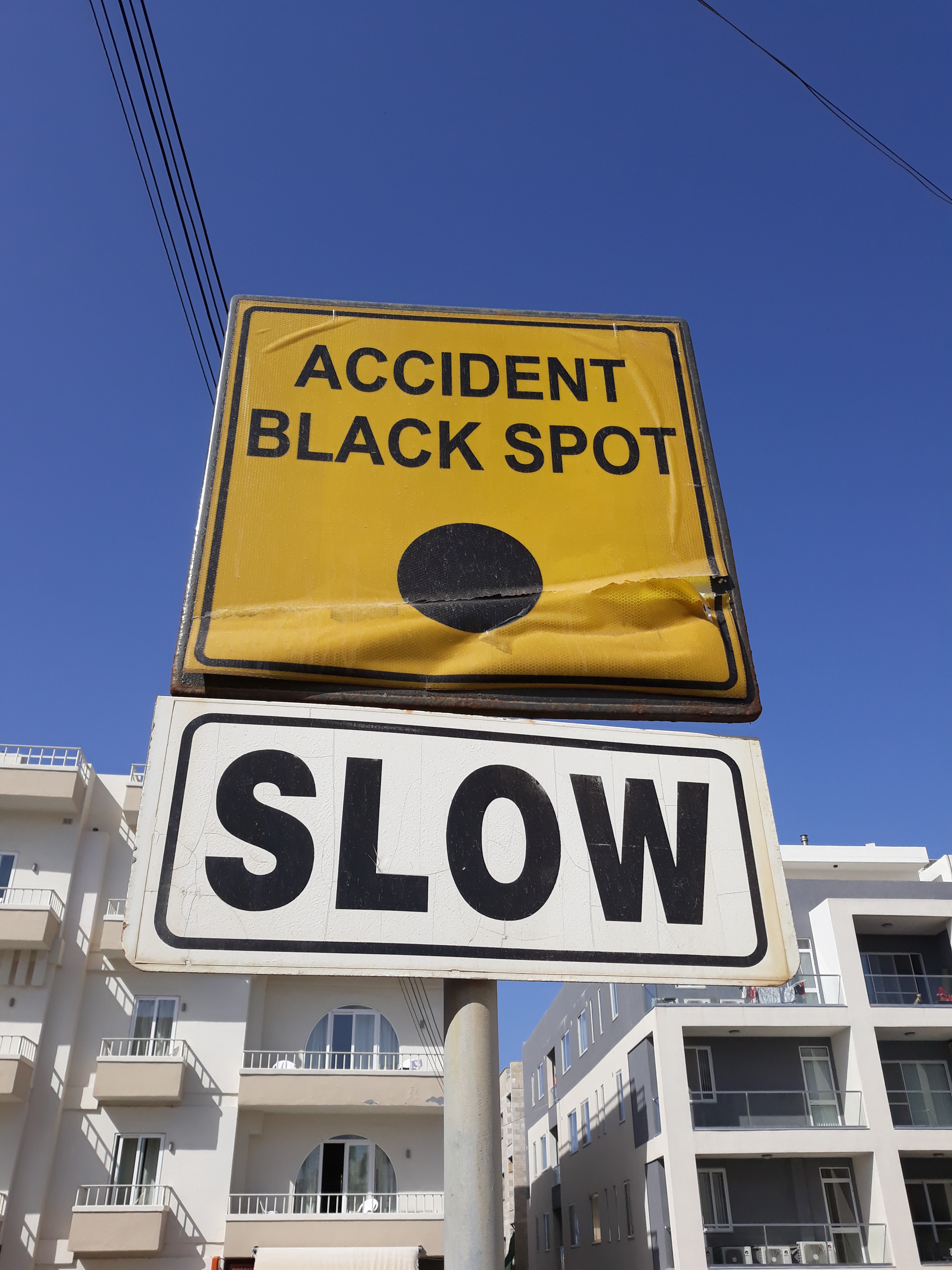
Accident black spot sign in Marsaskala, Malta

In road safety management, an accident blackspot or black spot is a place where road traffic collisions have historically been concentrated. There may have been several reasons for this, such as

- a sharp drop or corner in a straight road, concealing oncoming traffic
- a hidden junction on a fast road, or
- poor or concealed warning signs at a crossroads.

For some decades treatment of accident blackspots (e.g. by signage, speed restrictions, improving sightlines, straightening bends, or speed cameras) was a mainstay of road safety policy.

== By country ==
=== Australia ===
In 1990, in Australia, the Black Spot program was initially established under the Hawke government as a three-year initiative to run from 1990–91. The Government had plans to spend $110 million on improving safety at more than 1,000 sites, including intersections and bridges, over the three-year period to 30 June 1993. At the time, the program was administered by the Department of Transport and Communications.

=== France ===
In July 1980, a SETRA report, named "Points noirs glissants" show that solutions which do not answer the diagnostic may be less efficient.

In 2023, to prioritize urban crash zones, the CEREMA provided a new open source method using Epanechnikov computations.

=== Morocco ===
In 2024, 340 blackspots were identified in Morocco.

=== Switzerland ===
In Switzerland since 2013, the owner of the road is required to take action on blackspots, based on a prescriptive text: the "VSS SNR 641724 Sécurité routière, gestion des points noirs".

In 2011-2013, there were 1091 blackspots identified in Switzerland, including 767 in urban areas, 297 in rural areas and 27 on motorways. By 2020-2022, these numbers had reduced to 958, 684, 249 and 25.

Works have been done on 88 blackspots.

=== United Kingdom ===
In 1973, Edward Douglas-Scott-Montagu, 3rd Baron Montagu of Beaulieu said in a debate in the House of Lords:

One of the most ridiculous signs in this country is the "black spot" accident sign. If anything, this sign is a terrible reflection on the attitude of the road authorities. Accidents are caused by bad road design, and not by drivers looking for accidents. I hope that, as a result of this Bill, we shall see that rather ridiculous sign removed from British roads.

== EU directives ==
On 12 September 2001, the European Commission published a White Paper titled 'European transport policy for 2010: time to decide' in which it expresses a need to carry out safety impact assessments and road safety audits, in order to identify and manage high accident concentration sections.

The 2008/96/EC directive defined the "ranking of high accident concentration sections" as "a method to identify, analyse and rank sections of the road network which have been in operation for more than three years and upon which a large number of fatal accidents in proportion to the traffic flow have occurred". This definition was removed in 2019 by the Directive (UE) 2019/1936 which amended Directive 2008/96/EC.

== Criticism ==
Current thinking has it that the benefits of these interventions are often overstated. Effects such as regression toward the mean, risk compensation and accident migration combine to reduce the overall benefit.

In some cases it has been claimed that the end result of such interventions in accident blackspot areas is an increase in overall casualties. In one notable experiment, a number of accident blackspots were "treated" with a null treatment—placement of a garden gnome, according to some reports. Crash rates at these points were found to have decreased significantly in the following period, a finding which is taken as clear evidence supporting the theory of regression to the mean.
