= Family and Community Services =

Family and Community Services may refer to:

- Department of Family and Community Services (Australia), an Australian Government department (1998–2006)
- Family and Community Services (South Australia), a former South Australian Government agency
- New South Wales Department of Family and Community Services, a former New South Wales Government Department (2011–2019)
