= Transport for Wales (disambiguation) =

Transport for Wales may refer to:

- KeolisAmey Wales, train operator using the Transport for Wales brand from 14 October 2018 until 6 February 2021
- Transport for Wales, a government agency
- Transport for Wales Rail, train operator using the Transport for Wales brand since 7 February 2021

== See also ==
- Transport in Wales, a general overview of transport in Wales
- Transport in New South Wales, a general overview of transport in New South Wales, Australia
- Transport for NSW, an agency of the New South Wales Government in Australia
