= Department of Workplace Relations and Small Business =

Australian government department, 1997–1998

Department overview
- Formed: 18 July 1997
- Preceding Department: Department of Industry, Science and Tourism Department of Industrial Relations (II)
- Dissolved: 21 October 1998
- Superseding Department: Department of Employment, Workplace Relations and Small Business Department of Transport and Regional Services
- Jurisdiction: Commonwealth of Australia
- Headquarters: Canberra
- Minister responsible: Peter Reith, Minister
- Department executives: David Rosalky, Secretary (1997–1998); Peter Shergold, Secretary (1998)

The Department of Workplace Relations and Small Business was an Australian government department that existed between July 1997 and October 1998.

== Scope ==
Information about the department's functions and government funding allocation could be found in the Administrative Arrangements Orders, the annual Portfolio Budget Statements and in the Department's annual reports.

At its creation, the Department was responsible for the following:

- Industrial relations, including conciliation and arbitration in relation to industrial disputes
- Promotion of sound industrial relations policies, practices and machinery
- Public Service pay and conditions
- Remuneration Tribunals
- Occupational health, safety, rehabilitation and compensation
- Affirmative action
- Equal employment opportunity
- Tradespersons' rights regulations
- Small business

== Structure ==
The Department was an Australian Public Service department, staffed by officials who were responsible to the Minister for Workplace Relations and Small Business, Peter Reith.
