= Ken Matthews (public servant) =

Australian public servant

Ken Matthews AO

Secretary of the Department of Primary Industries and Energy
- In office 1998–1998

Secretary of the Department of Agriculture, Fisheries and Forestry
- In office 1998–1999

Secretary of the Department of Transport and Regional Services
- In office 1999–2004

Personal details
- Born: Ken Harry Matthews
- Spouse: Margaret
- Education: University of Sydney
- Occupation: Public servant
- Website: http://www.kenmatthews.com.au/

Ken Harry Matthews AO is a retired senior Australian public servant.

== Early life and background ==
Ken Matthews grew up on a farm near Griffith, New South Wales. He attended Griffith High School.

Matthews graduated from University of Sydney in 1974 with a Bachelor of Economics, majoring in government.

== Career ==
Ken Matthews joined the Australian Public Service in 1975, in the Department of Defence.

In 1998 Matthews was appointed Secretary of the Department of Primary Industries and Energy (later Department of Agriculture, Fisheries and Forestry).

In 1999 Matthews shifted to head the Department of Transport and Regional Services. Matthews headed the Department at the time of the September 11 attacks on the United States and during implementation of early stages of the Howard government counter-terrorism strategies.

In 2004, Matthews indicated to Prime Minister John Howard his keen interest in water reform and was appointed the first Chief Executive Officer and Chair of the National Water Commission, to be established in the Prime Minister's portfolio. Matthews retired as Chair and Chief Executive of the National Water Commission in October 2010. In his valedictory speech, he told his audience he wanted public servants to be bolder.

Matthews created controversy in 2007 when a leaked e-mail concerning a federal proposal to tax rainwater revealed Matthews (as chief of the National Water Commission) writing: "if rainwater tanks were to be adopted on a large scale such that their existence impacts significantly on the integrated water cycle, consideration could be given to setting an entitlement regime for this class of water" and "legally, all water in Australia is vested in governments." The Bracks government at the time stated it was opposed to taxes on rainwater.

== Awards ==
In January 2005, Matthews was made an Officer of the Order of Australia for service to the community through the development of more competitive and sustainable regional industries and services, to the national transport system, and to promoting the highest standards of public administration. Matthews had previously received a Centenary Medal in 2001 for services to public administration.

Flinders University presented Matthews with an honorary doctorate in April 2014.

Government offices
Preceded by Paul Barratt	Secretary of the Department of Primary Industries and Energy; 1998	Succeeded by Himself as Secretary of the Department of Agriculture, Fisheries and Forestry
Preceded by Paul Barratt	Secretary of the Department of Primary Industries and Energy; 1998	Succeeded by Russell Higgins as Secretary of the Department of Industry, Science and Resources
Preceded by Himself as Secretary of the Department of Primary Industries and Energy	Secretary of the Department of Agriculture, Fisheries and Forestry; 1998 – 1999	Succeeded by Mike Taylor
Preceded by Allan Hawke	Secretary of the Department of Transport and Regional Services; 1999 – 2004	Succeeded by Mike Taylor
