= Department of Family and Community Services =

The Department of Family and Community Services may refer to:

- Department of Family and Community Services (Australia), an Australian government department that existed between 1998 and 2006.
- Department of Family and Community Services (New South Wales), a New South Wales government department established in 2011.
