= Graham Evans (public servant) =

Australian public servant

Graham Evans AO

Secretary of the Department of Transport
- In office 23 December 1993 – 20 February 1995

Secretary of the Department of Transport and Communications
- In office 1 October 1988 – 23 December 1993

Secretary of the Department of Primary Industries and Energy
- In office 24 July 1987 – 31 August 1988

Secretary of the Department of Resources and Energy
- In office 1986 – 24 July 1987

Personal details
- Born: Graham Charles Evans; 22 January 1943 (age 83)
- Education: University of Melbourne; Australian National University; Johns Hopkins University
- Occupation: Public servant

Graham Charles Evans AO (born 22 January 1943) is a former senior Australian public servant and policymaker.

== Background and early life ==
Evans was born on 22 January 1943. He attended high school at St Patrick's College, Ballarat. His university studies were at University of Melbourne, Australian National University and Johns Hopkins University.

== Career ==
From 1968 to 1981, Evans held positions in overseas postings. His early public service career saw him variously working in positions in the Department of Foreign Affairs, the Treasury and the Department of the Prime Minister and Cabinet.

Evans was appointed to his first Secretary role in 1986, as head of the Department of Resources and Energy (later Department of Primary Industries and Energy).

Bob Hawke proposed Evans for the role of Secretary of the Department of Transport and Communications in 1988. Evans continued on as Secretary of the Department of Transport when the Transport and Communications mega department was split into two.

In 1992 Evans brought defamation proceedings to the ACT Supreme Court against John Fairfax Group over an article titled "Cosy in the Corridors of Power" that had appeared in the Sydney Morning Herald in April 1990. Evans claimed that the article implied his success in the public service was because of the patronage of former Prime Minister Bob Hawke. His action was dismissed in the ACT Supreme court in February 1993 and his appeal was rejected in the Federal Court in May 1994.

Evans retired from a 27-year career in the Australian Public Service in 1995, at which time he was appointed to the Board of Australia Post. In 1995 he was also appointed the head of external affairs at BHP, a position which he held until 2005.

== Awards ==
In 1995 Evans was appointed an Officer of the Order of Australia, for service to micro-economic reform in the transport and communications fields.

Government offices
Preceded by Himself as Secretary of the Department of Transport and Communications	Secretary of the Department of Transport; 1993 – 1995	Succeeded by Peter Core
Preceded by Peter Wilenski	Secretary of the Department of Transport and Communications; 1988 - 1993	Succeeded by Himself as Secretary of the Department of Transport
Preceded by Peter Wilenski	Secretary of the Department of Transport and Communications; 1988 - 1993	Succeeded by Neville Stevens as Secretary of the Department of Communications
Preceded by Geoff Miller as Secretary of the Department of Primary Industry	Secretary of the Department of Primary Industries and Energy; 1987 - 1988	Succeeded by Geoff Miller
Preceded by Himself as Secretary of the Department of Resources and Energy	Secretary of the Department of Primary Industries and Energy; 1987 - 1988	Succeeded by Geoff Miller
Preceded by Alan Woods	Secretary of the Department of Resources and Energy; 1986 – 1987	Succeeded by Himself as Secretary of the Department of Primary Industries and Energy
