= Department of Industrial Relations (1987–1997) =

Australian government department, 1987–1997

Department overview
- Formed: 24 July 1987
- Preceding Department: Department of Employment and Industrial Relations (II)
- Dissolved: 18 July 1997
- Superseding Department: Department of Workplace Relations and Small Business
- Jurisdiction: Commonwealth of Australia
- Headquarters: Canberra
- Ministers responsible: Ralph Willis, Minister (1987–1988); Peter Morris, Minister (1988–1990); Peter Cook, Minister (1990–1993); Laurie Brereton, Minister (1993–1996); Peter Reith, Minister (1996–1997)
- Department executives: Rae Taylor, Secretary (1987–1989); Graham Glenn, Secretary (1989–1992); Michael Costello, Secretary (1992–1993); Peter Core, Secretary (1993–1995); David Rosalky, Secretary (1995–1997)
- Website: DIR Home Page

The Department of Industrial Relations (also called DIR) was an Australian government department that existed between July 1987 and July 1997.

== Scope ==
Information about the department's functions and government funding allocation could be found in the Administrative Arrangements Orders, the annual Portfolio Budget Statements and in the Department's annual reports.

At its creation, the Department was responsible for the following:

- Industrial relations, including conciliation and arbitration in relation to industrial disputes
- Promotion of sound industrial relations policies, practices and machinery
- Public Service pay and conditions
- Remuneration tribunals

== Structure ==
The Department was an Australian Public Service department, staffed by officials who were responsible to the Minister for Industrial Relations. The department's central office was located in Canberra, with regional offices in Sydney, Melbourne, Adelaide, Brisbane, Perth, Darwin and Tasmania.
