= Mike Taylor (public servant) =

Australian public servant (1948–2023)

Mike Taylor AO

Secretary of the Department of Infrastructure, Transport, Regional Development and Local Government
- In office 3 December 2007 – March 2009

Secretary of the Department of Transport and Regional Services
- In office 2004 – 3 December 2007

Secretary of the Department of Agriculture, Fisheries and Forestry
- In office 23 November 2001 – 26 October 2004

Personal details
- Born: Michael John Taylor; 18 October 1948
- Died: 2 June 2023 (aged 74) Canberra, Australia
- Education: University of Melbourne; University of New England
- Occupation: Public servant

Michael John Taylor AO (18 October 1948 – 2 June 2023) was an Australian public servant and policymaker, and later an Independent Director of the Bushfire CRC.

== Life and career ==
Mike Taylor grew up in Melbourne, Victoria. In 1970 he completed his Bachelor of Agricultural Science having studied at the University of Melbourne.

Taylor took his first job with the Victorian Department of Agriculture in 1971. With the support of a cadetship from the department, he completed a graduate Diploma in Agriculture Economics, attained from the University of New England in 1972.

In the 1980s, Taylor worked at the Australian Dairy Industry Council.

He was Secretary of the Victorian State Government Department of Agriculture, prior to his appointment as Secretary of the Australian Government Department of Agriculture, Fisheries and Forestry.

In 2004, Taylor moved from the Agriculture department to the Department of Transport and Regional Services (later Infrastructure, Transport, Regional Development and Local Government). There he assumed responsibility for implementing several initiatives to upgrade maritime, aviation and land transport security.

Taylor retired from the Australian Public Service in 2009, amid rumours of a falling out with the Rudd Government.

In the years after he was a departmental secretary, Taylor took up several board positions, including as an Independent Director for the Bushfire Cooperative Research Centre, and as chairman of the Murray-Darling Basin Authority.

When he retired from the Murray-Darling Basin Authority Board, Taylor urged the Australian Government to "reconsider the next phase" of a controversial plan to restore the health of the Murray Darling river system. During his time as chair on the Authority, he was personally criticised by people concerned that the proposed cuts to water entitlements under the plan would harm their towns.

Taylor died after a short illness in Canberra, on 2 June 2023, at the age of 74.

== Awards ==
Taylor was awarded a Centenary Medal in 2001 for service as Secretary of the Department of Agriculture, Fisheries and Forestry.

In June 2007 Taylor was made an Officer of the Order of Australia for 'service to the management of natural resources and industry policy development at the Federal level and also in Victoria, particularly in the area of agriculture, and through contributions to transport, water, food and safety standards'.

== References and further reading ==
- Malone, Paul (2006), "Chapter 17: The Pragmatist – Mike Taylor, Department of Transport and Regional Services", Australian department heads under Howard : career paths and practice (PDF), Canberra, Australia: The Australian National University, pp. 113–119, ISBN 1-920942-83-1, archived from the original (PDF) on 6 November 2013
- Australian Journal of Agricultural and Resource Economics (2011), "2010 AARES Distinguished Life Member Michael J. Taylor", Australian Journal of Agricultural and Resource Economics, 55: 10–11, doi:10.1111/j.1467-8489.2010.00521.x

Government offices
Preceded by Himself as Secretary of the Department of Transport and Regional Services	Secretary of the Department of Infrastructure, Transport, Regional Development and Local Government; 2007 – 2009	Succeeded by Mike Mrdak
Preceded by Ken Matthews	Secretary of the Department of Transport and Regional Services; 2004 - 2007	Succeeded by Himself as Secretary of the Department of Infrastructure, Transport, Regional Development and Local Government
Preceded by Ken Matthews	Secretary of the Department of Agriculture, Fisheries and Forestry; 2000 – 2004	Succeeded by Joanna Hewitt
