= David Rosalky =

Australian public servant and academic

Secretary of the Department of Industrial Relations
- In office 1 February 1995 – 18 July 1997

Secretary of the Department of Workplace Relations and Small Business
- In office 18 July 1997 – 5 February 1998

Secretary of the Department of Social Security
- In office 5 February 1998 – 21 October 1998

Secretary of the Department of Family and Community Services
- In office 21 October 1998 – 26 November 2001

Personal details
- Born: 26 May 1946 (age 80)
- Education: University of Sydney; Australian National University
- Occupation: Public servant Academic

David Marcus Rosalky (born 26 May 1946) is an academic and a retired senior Australian public servant. He is currently a visiting fellow at the Crawford School of Economics and Government at the Australian National University in Canberra.

== Background and early life ==
David Rosalky was born in Sydney on 26 May 1946. He was educated at North Sydney Boys High School and Sydney University.

== Career ==
Rosalky began his Australian Public Service career in the Department of Defence.

From 1978 to 1980, Rosalky was a senior advisor in the economic division of the Department of the Prime Minister and Cabinet. Between 1980 and 1983, Rosalky was Senior Private Secretary to Prime Minister Malcolm Fraser. Media reported that their sources told them Rosalky had not applied for his new position but had rather been asked to take it.

In September 1992 Rosalky was appointed ACT Under-Treasurer. In July 1994 he was appointed Secretary of the ACT Government Chief Minister's Department.

Rosalky was appointed to his first Australian Government departmental secretary role in 1995, as head of the Department of Industrial Relations (later Department of Workplace Relations and Small Business). His move back to the federal public service was reportedly engineered within three days.

Prime Minister John Howard shifted Rosalky from the Department of Workplace Relations and Small Business to a new role as head of the Department of Social Security in early 1998. Later that year, the Department was transitioned to become the Department of Family and Community Services (FaCS) and it grew to take on functions from other departments and agencies.

Rosalky retired from the public service in 2001, announcing his departure from the service while FaCS was in caretaker mode prior to the 2001 federal election.

Government offices
Preceded by Peter Core	Secretary of the Department of Industrial Relations; 1995–1997	Succeeded by Himself as Secretary of the Department of Workplace Relations and Small Business
Preceded by Himself as Secretary of the Department of Industrial Relations	Secretary of the Department of Workplace Relations and Small Business; 1997–1998	Succeeded by Peter Shergold
Preceded by Tony Blunn	Secretary of the Department of Social Security; 1998	Succeeded by Himself as Secretary of the Department of Family and Community Services
Preceded by Himself as Secretary of the Department of Social Security	Secretary of the Department of Family and Community Services; 1998–2001	Succeeded by Mark Sullivan
Preceded by Andrew Podger as Secretary of the Department of Health and Family Services	Secretary of the Department of Family and Community Services; 1998–2001	Succeeded by Mark Sullivan
