= Mark Sullivan (public servant) =

Australian public servant and policymaker

Mark Sullivan AO

Secretary of the Department of Veterans' Affairs
- In office 26 October 2004 – 2008

Secretary of the Department of Family and Community Services
- In office 2002–2004

Personal details
- Born: Mark Anthony Sullivan
- Spouse: Bronwyn
- Children: Fiona and Ryan
- Education: University of Sydney
- Occupation: Public servant

Mark Anthony Sullivan AO is a former senior Australian public servant and policymaker.

== Background and early life ==
Sullivan studied economics and accounting at University of Sydney. Before graduating in 1973 the Australian Taxation Office offered him a cadetship, allowing him to finish his studies on pay.

== Career ==
After graduating, Sullivan joined the Taxation Office, working in offices in Sydney, Parramatta and Canberra. He went on to work in the Department of Social Security, SBS and the Department of Immigration, Local Government and Ethnic Affairs (later Immigration and Ethnic Affairs and then Immigration and Multicultural Affairs. In the immigration department, he was engaged in managing boat people arrivals in 1989 and 1990.

Between 1999 and 2002 Sullivan was the chief executive officer of the Aboriginal and Torres Strait Islander Commission. Then, in 2002, he was appointed Secretary of the Department of Family and Community Services (FaCS).

In 2004, the Howard government rotated Sullivan from FaCS to the Department of Veterans' Affairs. In 2008 Sullivan left his role at Veterans' Affairs to join the ACTEW Corporation as managing director.

During his time at ACTEW, Sullivan led major water projects, including the Cotter Dam expansion project, with the aim to "drought-proof" Canberra. Sullivan announced his retirement from the ACTEW Corporation in February 2014, collecting a $690,000 termination payment on his departure.

== Awards ==
In 2008 Sullivan was made an Officer of the Order of Australia for service as Secretary of FaCS.

== References and further reading ==
- Malone, Paul (2006), "Chapter 11: Making the Best of It – Mark Sullivan, Department of Veterans' Affairs", Australian department heads under Howard : career paths and practice (PDF), Canberra, Australia: Australian National University, pp. 69–75, ISBN 1-920942-83-1, archived from the original (PDF) on 6 November 2013
- Sullivan, Mark (2012), "Chapter 9: An unlikely secretary—a boy from the outer agencies", With the benefit of hindsight: Valedictory reflections from departmental secretaries, 2004–11 (PDF), Canberra, Australia: Australian National University, pp. 87–94, ISBN 9781921862731, archived from the original (PDF) on 5 February 2014

Government offices
Preceded by Neil Johnston	Secretary of the Department of Veterans' Affairs; 2004–2008	Succeeded by Ian Campbell
Preceded by David Rosalky	Secretary of the Department of Family and Community Services; 2002–2004	Succeeded by Jeff Harmer
