= Department of Transport (1993–1996) =

Australian government department, 1993–1996

Department overview
- Formed: 23 December 1993
- Preceding Department: Department of Transport and Communications
- Dissolved: 11 March 1996
- Superseding Department: Department of Transport and Regional Development
- Jurisdiction: Commonwealth of Australia
- Minister responsible: Laurie Brereton, Minister for Transport
- Department executives: Graham Evans, Secretary (1993–1995); Peter Core, Secretary (1995–1996)

The Department of Transport was an Australian government department that existed between December 1993 and March 1996. It was the fifth department to be given the name.

== Scope ==
Information about the department's functions and government funding allocation could be found in the Administrative Arrangements Orders, the annual Portfolio Budget Statements and in the department's annual reports.

According to the Administrative Arrangements Order made on 15 December 1993, the department dealt with:

- Shipping and marine navigation
- Land transport (including road safety)
- Civil aviation and air navigation
- Aviation security

== Structure ==
The department was an Australian Public Service department responsible to the Minister for Transport, Laurie Brereton. Department officials were headed by a Secretary, initially Graham Evans (until his retirement on 20 February 1995), and then Peter Core.
