= Allan Hawke =

Australian public servant and diplomat (1948–2022)

Allan Hawke AC
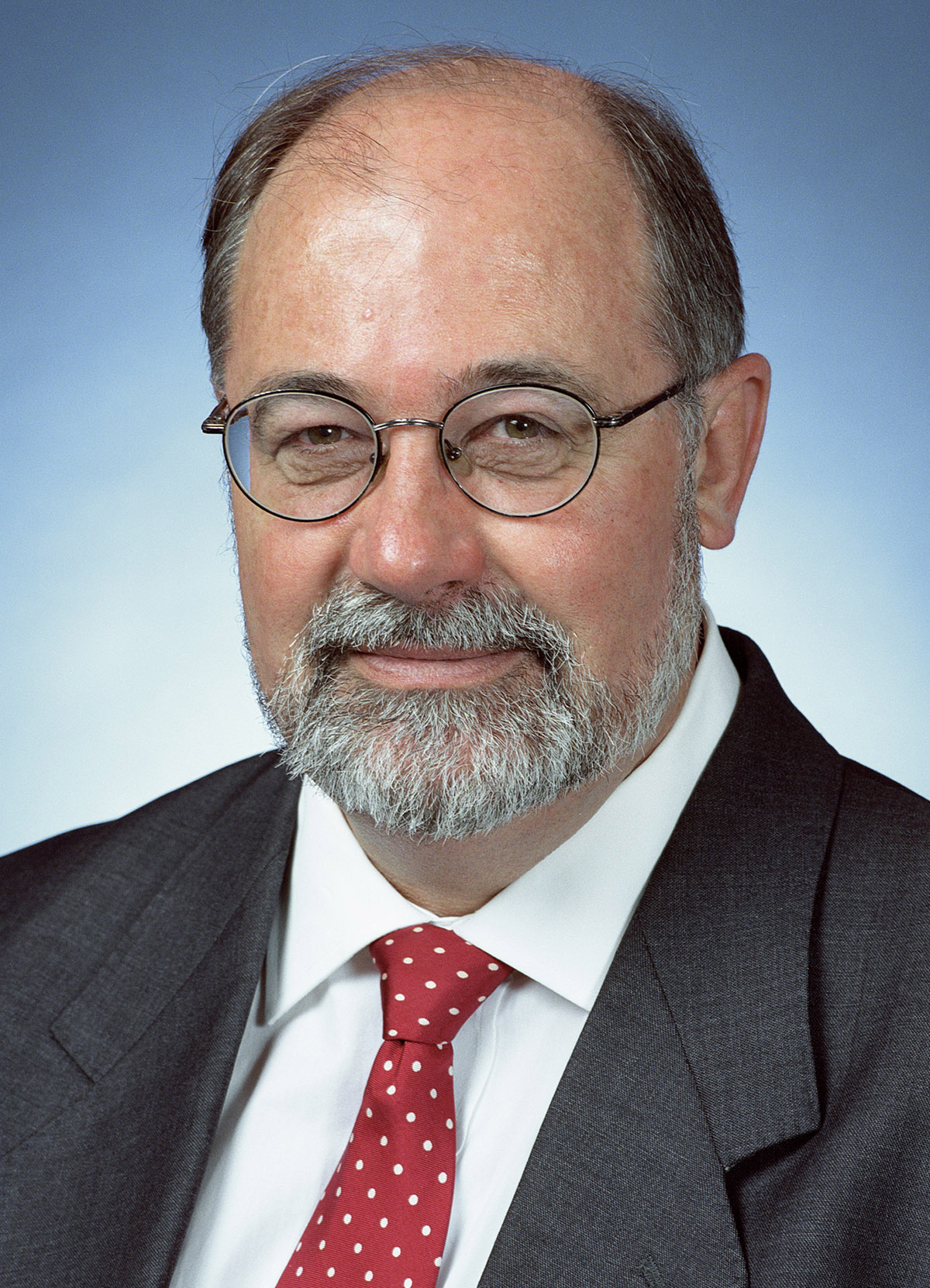

Personal details
- Born: 18 February 1948 Canberra, Australian Capital Territory, Australia
- Died: 31 August 2022 (aged 74) Canberra, Australian Capital Territory, Australia
- Spouse: Maria Michele Senti
- Education: Australian National University
- Occupation: Public servant, diplomat, chancellor, company director
- Awards: Companion of the Order of Australia (2010); Centenary Medal (2001)

Allan Douglas Hawke AC (18 February 1948 – 31 August 2022) was an Australian senior public servant and diplomat.

During his public service career, Hawke served as Chief of Staff to Prime Minister Paul Keating; Secretary of the Department of Veterans' Affairs (1994–1996); Secretary of the Department of Transport and Regional Services (1996–1999); and Secretary of the Department of Defence (1999–2002). Hawke was then appointed High Commissioner to New Zealand (2003–2005), and subsequently Chancellor of the Australian National University (2006–2008).

Hawke was Chairman of the Canberra Raiders Board of Directors.

== Background and early years ==
Hawke was born in Canberra, Australian Capital Territory, and educated at Queanbeyan High School in New South Wales. Hawke held a Bachelor of Science (1st Class Honours) and a Doctor of Philosophy from the Australian National University, Canberra.

== Career ==
Hawke's extensive career in public administration at senior levels included appointments as Secretary of the Departments of Veterans' Affairs, Transport and Regional Development (later Transport and Regional Services) and Defence. He completed his public service to Australia as High Commissioner and Plenipotentiary of Australia to New Zealand, between 2003 and 2006.

Hawke was appointed a Fellow of the Australian Institute of Public Administration (FAIPA) in 1998 and a Fellow of the Australian Institute of Management (FAIM) in 1999, in recognition of his outstanding contribution to public service. In 2001, he became a Fellow of the Australian Institute of Company Directors (FAICD) and was also honoured with the Centenary Medal for his service as Secretary to the Department of Defence. The Australian Financial Review's "Boss" Magazine named him as one of Australia's top 30 true leaders in its inaugural list in 2001.

In 2010, Hawke was appointed a Companion of the Order of Australia for his eminent service to public administration, particularly through the formulation and implementation of policy in the areas of transport, defence and education, and to the strengthening of bilateral relations with New Zealand.

Hawke participated in major inquiries into the Commonwealth Public Service including:

- the Review of Commonwealth Functions;
- the Review of Commonwealth Administration and the Efficiency Scrutiny Unit;
- Head of the Secretariat for the Review of the Aboriginal and Torres Strait Islander Commission;
- The Hawke Report – a review of the Environment Protection and Biodiversity Conservation Act 1999 (EPBC Act, the Act);
- the Review of the Administration of the Home Insulation Program – a review into the failings and the future of the Home Insulation Program (part of the Renewable Energy Bonus Scheme);
- government review of Woomera Prohibited Area; and
- a foundation member of the Management Improvement Advisory Committee.

On 3 September 2010, ACT Chief Minister Jon Stanhope announced that Hawke would lead a review into the Australian Capital Territory's Public Service. Following the release of his findings in March 2011, the Federal Government ordered another review into the National Capital Authority, where Hawke will conduct the inquiry.

In March 2011, Immigration Minister, Chris Bowen, announced that an independent review into the Christmas Island breakouts and riots will be carried out by two former senior public servants, Dr Allan Hawke and Helen Williams. Also in March 2011, the Minister for Regional Australia, Regional Development and Local Government, the Hon Simon Crean MP, announced that Hawke was to conduct an independent review of the National Capital Authority.

Hawke served on various boards including the Management Advisory Board, Administrative Review Council, Australian Strategic Policy Institute Council, Foreign Affairs Council and the Defence and National Security Advisory Council. Hawke's other appointments included Chairs of the MTAA Superannuation Fund Trustee Board, the Civil Aviation Safety Authority, the Canberra Raiders Board, and the Prime Ministerial Advisory Council on Ex-Service Matters; a director of ACTEW Corporation; and a member of the Centre for Applied Philosophy & Public Ethics Advisory Board

== Personal life ==
Hawke married Maria Michele Senti on 2 April 1977 and they have one child. For recreation he enjoyed golf, researching family history and he was a member of the Royal Canberra Golf Club.

Hawke died of cancer on 31 August 2022.

Government offices
Preceded by Paul Barratt	Secretary of the Department of Defence; 1999–2002	Succeeded by Ric Smith
Preceded by Himself as Secretary of the Department of Transport and Regional Development	Secretary of the Department of Transport and Regional Services; 1998–1999	Succeeded by Ken Matthews
Preceded by Peter Core as Secretary of the Department of Transport	Secretary of the Department of Transport and Regional Development; 1996–1998	Succeeded by Himself as Secretary of the Department of Transport and Regional Services
Preceded by Andrew Podger as Secretary of the Department of Housing and Regional Development	Secretary of the Department of Transport and Regional Development; 1996–1998	Succeeded by Himself as Secretary of the Department of Transport and Regional Services
Preceded by Lionel Woodward	Secretary of the Department of Veterans' Affairs; 1994–1996	Succeeded by Neil Johnston
Diplomatic posts
Preceded by Bob Cotton	Australian High Commissioner to New Zealand; 2003–2006	Succeeded by John Dauth
Academic offices
Preceded by Peter Baume	Chancellor of the Australian National University; 2006–2008	Succeeded by Kim Beazley
