= Neil Johnston (public servant) =

Neil Johnston AO

Secretary of the Department of Veterans' Affairs
- In office 11 March 1996 – 30 September 2004

Personal details
- Born: Harold Neil Johnston; 1945 (age 80–81)
- Spouse: Margaret
- Children: David, Peter and Anne
- Education: University of Pennsylvania; Australian National University
- Occupation: Public servant

Harold Neil Johnston, AO (born 1945) is a former senior Australian public servant and policymaker.

== Life and career ==
Neil Johnston was born in Werribee, Victoria, in 1945. His Australian Public Service career included work in the Australian Bureau of Statistics, the Department of the Treasury, the Department of Finance, the Department of Employment, Education and Training and the Department of Social Security.

Johnston was Secretary of the Department of Veterans' Affairs between 1996 and 2004.

Johnston retired from the public service in September 2004.

== Awards ==
Johnston was made an Officer of the Order of Australia in January 2005 for service to the community through the initiation and implementation of a range of policies designed to meet the diverse welfare and social needs of ex-Service personnel and their families, and more broadly to public sector administration in the areas of economic and business development and service delivery.

Government offices
Preceded by Allan Hawke	Secretary of the Department of Veterans' Affairs; 1996–2004	Succeeded by Mark Sullivan
