= Michael Costello (public servant) =

Australian public servant

Michael Costello AO

Secretary of the Department of Industrial Relations
- In office 6 March 1992 – 27 May 1993

Secretary of the Department of Foreign Affairs and Trade
- In office 27 May 1993 – 8 March 1996

Personal details
- Born: Michael John Costello
- Spouse: Christine Wallace
- Occupation: Public servant

Michael John Costello AO is a former senior Australian public servant and chief of staff to former Australian Labor Party politician Kim Beazley during Beazley's tenure as Leader of the Opposition from 1996 to 2001.

In 1992, Costello was appointed Secretary of the Department of Industrial Relations, where he stayed until 1993 when he was appointed Secretary of the Department of Foreign Affairs and Trade (DFAT). In this role, he took a proactive position on Asia. In 1996, he and five other Australian Government departmental secretaries were summarily dismissed by the newly elected Howard government in 1996 in what journalist Paul Kelly described in 2005 as "the greatest blood-letting upon any change of government since Federation".

On leaving DFAT, he became the CEO of ACTEW Corporation, the Australian Capital Territory's electricity and water authority.

In 2004, he was highly critical of Mark Latham for Labor's federal election defeat to the Howard government.

In 2008, he wrote a weekly column for The Australian supportive of Beazley and Labor's economic policies during the Hawke and Keating years.

On 26 June 2010, Costello had a final column published in The Australian concerning the federal ALP's dumping of Kevin Rudd in favour of Julia Gillard. Costello downplayed the role of the factions and unions, arguing that "The truth is that the power of the factions and the unions has been steadily declining."

== Awards ==
Costello was made an Officer of the Order of Australia in 1996, in recognition of service to international relations, particularly in relation to the Cambodian peace settlement and the Chemical Warfare Convention.

== Personal life ==
Costello is married to Christine Wallace, Australian journalist and biographer.

Government offices
Preceded by Graham Glenn	Secretary of the Department of Industrial Relations; 1992 – 1993	Succeeded by Peter Core
Preceded by Peter Wilenski	Secretary of the Department of Foreign Affairs and Trade; 1993 – 1996	Succeeded by Philip Flood
Diplomatic posts
Preceded by Richard Woolcott	Acting; Permanent Representative of Australia to the United Nations; 1988–1989	Succeeded by Peter Wilenski
