= Paul Barratt =

Australian public servant (1944–2021)

Paul Barratt AO

Secretary of the Department of Defence
- In office February 1998 – 31 August 1999

Secretary of the Department of Primary Industries and Energy
- In office 11 March 1996 – 5 February 1998

Personal details
- Born: Paul Hunter Barratt; 19 March 1944 Sydney, New South Wales, Australia
- Died: 3 October 2021 (aged 77) Armidale, New South Wales, Australia
- Parent(s): Paul Eric Hunter Barratt; Shirley Egan
- Education: Australian National University; University of New England
- Occupation: Public servant

Paul Hunter Barratt AO (19 March 1944 – 3 October 2021) was a senior Australian public servant, policymaker and peace activist. He was Chairman of Australia21, Chairman of UNE Foundation, and President and co-founder of Australians for War Powers Reform.

== Background and early life ==
Paul Barratt was born in 1944 and two years later his family moved to Armidale, when his father was offered a position with the University of New England. He attended the Armidale Demonstration School between 1949 and 1955 and sat his New South Wales Leaving Certificate at The Armidale School in 1960. In 1961 he began his degree at the University of New England, living in Wright College and graduating with an honours degree in physics.

== Career ==
Barratt joined the Commonwealth Public Sector in the Department of Defence in 1966.

Between 1974 and 1985, Barratt was a Deputy Secretary in the Department of Trade and accompanied Prime Minister Bob Hawke on his February 1984 visit to China.

Between 1992 and 1996 Barratt was Executive Director at the Business Council of Australia. In 1996, Barratt rejoined the Australian Public Service as Secretary of the Department of Primary Industries and Energy, offered the role by Prime Minister John Howard, on the recommendation of Deputy Prime Minister John Anderson. Barratt had accepted a $70,000 pay cut to return to the public sector.

Barratt transferred from the Department of Primary Industries and Energy to a second Secretary role in 1998, this time at the Department of Defence.

Barratt was dismissed from his Secretary role at Defence in August 1999, with a letter saying he was being dismissed because his minister John Moore "had lost trust and confidence" in his abilities to perform his duties. Barratt fought the dismissal, taking his case to the Federal Court. He was successful in establishing that a Department Secretary has a right to be heard before termination of his/her appointment, but in March 2000 the Federal Court rejected an appeal in relation to the nature of that hearing.

Barratt was Deputy Chairman of the Cooperative Research Centre for Advanced Composite Structures from 2010-2015. He was Chairman of Australia 21, Chairman of UNE Foundation, and co-founder (along with Alison Broinowski) and President of Australians for War Powers Reform. From 2015 to 2021 Barratt was an adjunct professor of Humanities, Arts and Social Sciences at the University of New England.

== Death ==
In June 2021, Barratt stood down from his executive and academic roles due to illness. On 3 October 2021, physician Alex Wodak announced that Barratt had died the night before. He was 77.

== Awards ==
In 1997 Barratt received a Distinguished Alumni Award from the University of New England. In 1999 Barratt was made an Officer of the Order of Australia for service to public administration, public policy development, business and international trade. In 2019 he was awarded an Honorary Doctor of Letters Honoris Causa (HonDLitt) by the UNE Council.

Government offices
Preceded by Tony Ayers	Secretary of the Department of Defence; 1998–1999	Succeeded by Allan Hawke
Preceded by Greg Taylor	Secretary of the Department of Primary Industries and Energy; 1996–1998	Succeeded by Ken Matthews
