= Peter Core =

Australian public servant and policymaker

Secretary of the Department of Transport
- In office 1995–1996

Secretary of the Department of Industrial Relations
- In office 1993–1995

Personal details
- Born: Peter Core; 194?
- Education: University of New England
- Occupation: Public servant

Peter Core is a former senior Australian public servant and policymaker.

== Background and early life ==
Peter Core was schooled at the James Ruse Agricultural High School in New South Wales. He then studied for a Bachelor of Rural Science and a Master of Economics from the University of New England.

== Career ==
In 1993 Core was appointed Secretary of the Department of Industrial Relations, promoted from his role as a Deputy Secretary in the Department of Primary Industries and Energy. He entered the role at a time of significant change, with the Minister for Industrial Relations Laurie Brereton planning a major re-write of the Industrial Relations Act.

Core shifted to a role as Secretary of the Department of Transport in 1995. The following year, Core's appointment was one of six secretary appointments terminated following the election of the Howard government.

He served as Managing Director of the Rural Industries Research and Development Corporation from 1996 to 2002 and afterwards became Chief Executive Officer of the Australian Centre for International Agricultural Research.

Core is a member of the National Capital Authority.

Government offices
Preceded by Graham Evans	Secretary of the Department of Transport; 1995 – 1996	Succeeded by Allan Hawke as Secretary of the Department of Transport and Regional Development
Preceded by Michael Costello	Secretary of the Department of Industrial Relations; 1993 – 1995	Succeeded by David Rosalky
