= Christine Wallace =

Australian political journalist and biographer

- Born: 1960 (age 65–66)
- Education: PhD (ANU, 2015); MBA (AGSM); BEc (Syd); BA (ANU)
- Occupation: Academic / biographer / political journalist
- Works: Hewson: A Portrait (1993); Germaine Greer, Untamed Shrew (1997); The Private Don (2004)
- Spouse: Michael Costello

Christine Wallace (born 1960) is an Australian political journalist, biographer and academic. She is currently an Australian Research Council DECRA fellow at the National Centre of Biography, Australian National University.

Her publications include biographies of John Hewson (1993), Germaine Greer (1997), and Don Bradman (2004).

== Education ==
Wallace is a graduate of the Australian National University (BA, politics and history), University of Sydney (BEc) and the Australian Graduate School of Management (MBA).

In 2015, she completed her PhD (Australian National University) on political biography as political intervention.

== Career ==
=== Political journalist ===
Wallace was a member of the Canberra Press Gallery and worked for a wide range of print and electronic media outlets including The Australian, The Australian Financial Review, Business Review Weekly, ABC Television, 666 ABC Canberra and the Adelaide radio station 5AA.

After a decade of political and economic journalism, she became a full-time writer in Sydney following the 1996 Australian federal election.

=== Biographer ===
Wallace has published three biographies.

- Former leader of the Australian Liberal Party, John Hewson.
  - Hewson: A Portrait (1993) Sun Australia, ISBN 978-0-7251-0723-9
- Feminist and public intellectual, Germaine Greer. The biography was unauthorised, and Greer called Wallace a "flesh-eating bacterium" and the book "a piece of excrement".
  - Germaine Greer, Untamed Shrew (1997) Pan Macmillan, ISBN 0-7329-0866-3; (1998) Faber and Faber, ISBN 978-0-571-19934-1
- Cricketer Sir Don Bradman, based on the 1953 to 1977 correspondence between Bradman and Rohan Rivett, the editor of Adelaide newspaper, The News.
  - The Private Don (2004) Allen & Unwin, ISBN 978-1-74114-475-8

She also wrote, but did not publish, an unauthorised biography of Julia Gillard when she was Prime Minister. The book was to be called Julia Gillard: unauthorised, and was to be published by Allen & Unwin in 2011. It was allocated an ISBN, 978-1-74175-848-1, but never published.

Her 2023 book, Political Lives: Australian prime ministers and their biographers, was shortlisted for the Australian History Prize at the New South Wales Premier's History Awards in the same year.

=== Academic ===
In 2015, she was awarded her PhD for a thesis entitled The Silken Cord: Contemporaneous 20th Century Prime Ministerial Biography in Australia and Its Meaning. It explores the idea of political biography as political intervention, through the contemporaneous political biography of twentieth century Australian politicians.

In 2017, the Australian Research Council awarded Wallace a Discovery Early Career Researcher Award (DECRA) for a post-doctoral study entitled The Caseys and Pat Jarrett in Washington, 1940–1942. It will study Australian Minister Richard Gardiner 'Dick' Casey, his wife Maie Casey and their press aide Patricia 'Pat' Jarrett, who served in Washington during 1940–41.

She currently holds her DECRA fellowship at the National Centre of Biography, Australian National University.

== Personal life ==
Wallace is married to Michael Costello, a former senior Australian public servant.
