= Port Latta, Tasmania =

Port Latta Tasmania
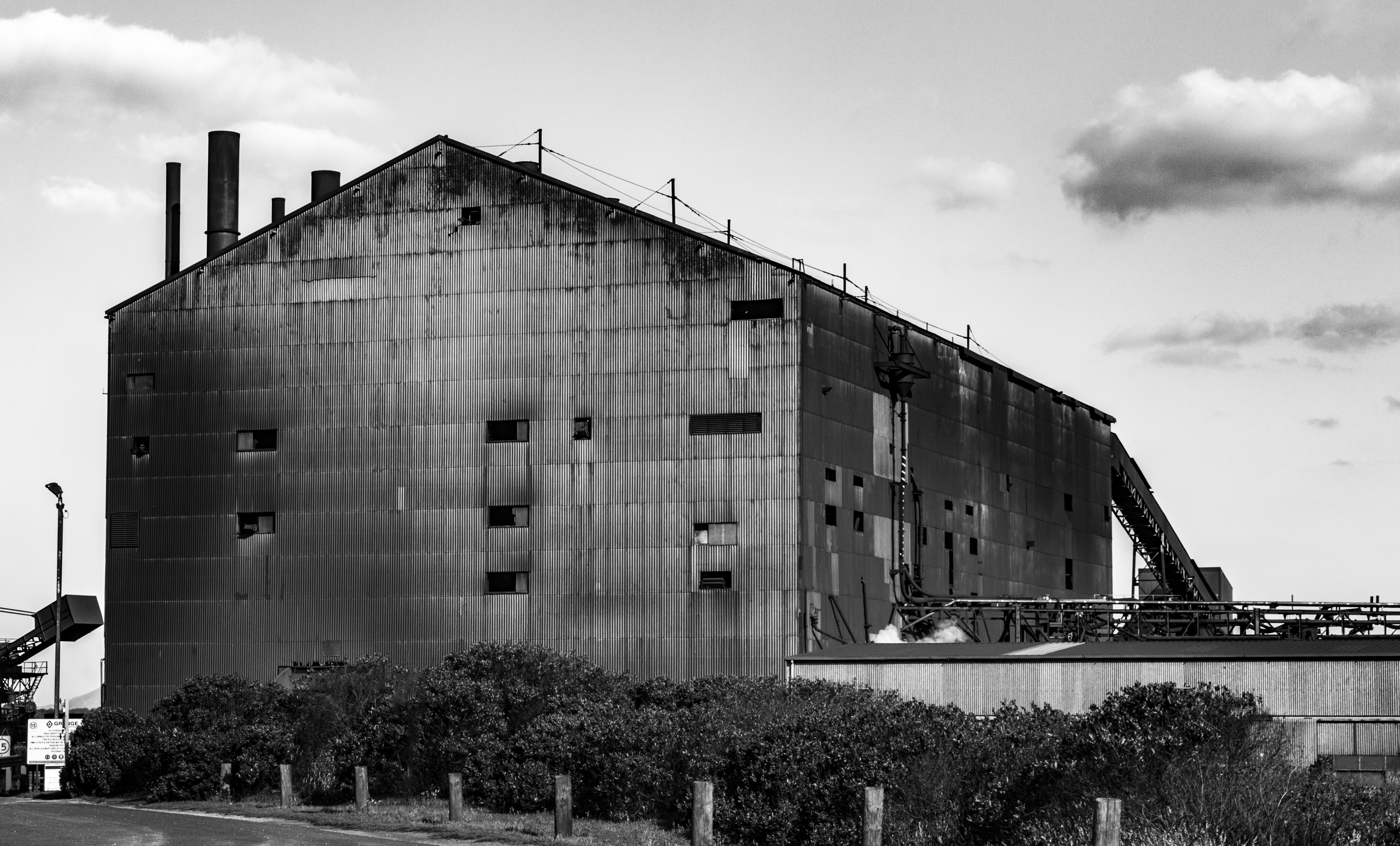
- Iron ore pelletizing plant

- Coordinates: 40.852°S 145.381°E
- Population: 0 (2016 census)
- LGA(s): Circular Head Council
Localities around Port Latta:
Stanley	Bass Strait	Bass Strait
	Port Latta	Rocky Cape National Park

Port Latta is a locality in North West Tasmania, with a processing plant and port used to export iron ore from the Savage River mine.

Ore is transported from mine to port by a slurry pipeline, which is 85 km long and paralleled by Pipeline Road. After de-watering, the ore is loaded onto ships via conveyor belts. The capacity of the mine, pipeline and conveyor belt is about 2.4MTpa.

The mine and port opened in 1967, and was still operating in 2021 with an expected life of mine to 2035 as per their 2020 yearly report.
