= Department of Transport and Regional Development =

Australian government department, 1996–1998

Department overview
- Formed: 11 March 1996
- Preceding Department: Department of Transport (V) Department of Housing and Regional Development – for regional development function Department of the Environment, Sport and Territories – for territories
- Dissolved: 21 October 1998
- Superseding Department: Department of Transport and Regional Services
- Jurisdiction: Commonwealth of Australia
- Headquarters: Canberra
- Ministers responsible: John Sharp (Mar 1996 – Sep 1997); John Anderson (Sep 1997 – Oct 1997); Mark Vaile (Oct 1997 – Oct 1998)
- Department executive: Allan Hawke, Secretary
- Website: dot.gov.au at the Wayback Machine (archived 22 December 1996)

The Department of Transport and Regional Development was an Australian government department that existed between March 1996 and October 1998.

== Scope ==
Information about the department's functions and government funding allocation could be found in the Administrative Arrangements Orders, the annual Portfolio Budget Statements and in the department's annual reports.

According to the Administrative Arrangements Order made on 11 March 1996, the department dealt with:

- Shipping and marine navigation
- Land transport (including road safety)
- Civil aviation and air navigation
- Aviation security
- Regional development

== Structure ==
The department was administered by Australian public servants who were responsible to the Minister for Transport and Regional Development.

The Secretary of the Department was Allan Hawke.

Ministers for the Department of Transport and Regional Development
Start date	End date	Minister
11 March 1996	25 September 1997	John Sharp
25 September 1997	9 October 1997	John Anderson
9 October 1997	21 October 1998	Mark Vaile
