= Savage River, Tasmania =

Savage River
- Town
- Coordinates: 41°30′45″S 145°12′55″E
- Country: Australia
- State: Tasmania
- LGA: Waratah-Wynyard Council
- Location: 113 km (70 mi) SW of Burnie; 152 km (94 mi) NW of Queenstown; 269 km (167 mi) W of Launceston
- Established: 1965

Government
  - State electorate: Braddon
  - Federal division: Braddon
- Elevation: 355 m (1,165 ft)

Population
  - Total: 31(2016 census)
- Postcode: 7321

Savage River is a small Australian mining village located on the west coast of Tasmania.

== History ==
Government surveyor Charles Sprent discovered Savage River's iron ore deposits in 1877, however the minerals were left untouched for nearly a century due to the difficulty in extracting iron from the low-quality ore. Several surveys were conducted in the interim including one in 1926 by Australian Iron & Steel. The township at Savage River was constructed from 1965 to 1967 when Roy Hudson's Industrial and Mining Investigations Pty Ltd received backing to construct a mining in the area.

Savage River Post Office opened on 23 November 1967.

== Mining operations ==
The Savage River Mine is an open-cut iron ore mine operated by Grange Resources. Production at the mine in 2006–07 was 1.423 million cubic metres of ore with 4.851 million cubic metres of waste. At June 2007, 50.9% of the 323.8 million tonnes of resources from the mine was recoverable magnetite. The iron ore is piped as slurry north to the coast at Port Latta for on-shipment.

== Climate ==
Climate data for Savage River Mine (1966-2017)
Month	Jan	Feb	Mar	Apr	May	Jun	Jul	Aug	Sep	Oct	Nov	Dec	Year
Record high °C (°F)	34.1 (93.4)	34.4 (93.9)	31.2 (88.2)	25.2 (77.4)	21.3 (70.3)	18.3 (64.9)	18.6 (65.5)	17.9 (64.2)	23.9 (75.0)	26.0 (78.8)	30.8 (87.4)	32.4 (90.3)	34.4 (93.9)
Mean daily maximum °C (°F)	19.1 (66.4)	20.1 (68.2)	17.7 (63.9)	15.1 (59.2)	12.3 (54.1)	10.2 (50.4)	9.4 (48.9)	10.1 (50.2)	11.2 (52.2)	13.5 (56.3)	15.5 (59.9)	17.3 (63.1)	14.3 (57.7)
Mean daily minimum °C (°F)	9.2 (48.6)	9.9 (49.8)	8.5 (47.3)	7.3 (45.1)	5.8 (42.4)	4.1 (39.4)	3.3 (37.9)	3.5 (38.3)	4.1 (39.4)	5.3 (41.5)	6.7 (44.1)	7.8 (46.0)	6.3 (43.3)
Record low °C (°F)	−2.2 (28.0)	2.3 (36.1)	−0.1 (31.8)	−2.9 (26.8)	−3.9 (25.0)	−3.3 (26.1)	−3.5 (25.7)	−5.0 (23.0)	−3.4 (25.9)	−1.1 (30.0)	−4.0 (24.8)	−1.8 (28.8)	−5.0 (23.0)
Average precipitation mm (inches)	98.0 (3.86)	77.7 (3.06)	107.5 (4.23)	151.3 (5.96)	200.9 (7.91)	193.6 (7.62)	235.6 (9.28)	234.3 (9.22)	199.8 (7.87)	169.6 (6.68)	127.2 (5.01)	123.0 (4.84)	1,976.6 (77.82)
Average rainy days (≥ 0.2 mm)	14.1	12.5	15.6	19.0	21.7	20.9	23.2	24.3	22.2	20.6	17.1	17.1	228.3
Mean daily sunshine hours	7.2	7.6	5.3	4.2	3.1	2.6	2.8	3.8	3.9	5.0	6.1	6.4	4.8
Source: Bureau of Meteorology
