= Department of Infrastructure and Transport =

Australian government department, 2010–2013

Department overview
- Formed: 14 September 2010
- Preceding Department: Department of Infrastructure, Transport, Regional Development and Local Government
- Dissolved: 18 September 2013
- Superseding Department: Department of Infrastructure and Regional Development
- Jurisdiction: Commonwealth of Australia
- Headquarters: Canberra
- Employees: 1043 (at April 2013)
- Ministers responsible: Anthony Albanese; Minister for Infrastructure and Transport
- Department executive: Mike Mrdak, Secretary

The Department of Infrastructure and Transport was an Australian government department. It was formed in September 2010, following the federal election in August 2010. The department absorbing parts of the Department of Infrastructure, Transport, Regional Development and Local Government. Regional development and local government functions were sent to the Department of Regional Australia, Regional Development and Local Government. Following the 2013 federal election, the department was renamed on 18 September 2013 to become the Department of Infrastructure and Regional Development, regaining regional development and local government functions.

The department was headquartered in the Canberra central business district at Infrastructure House and the neighbouring building.

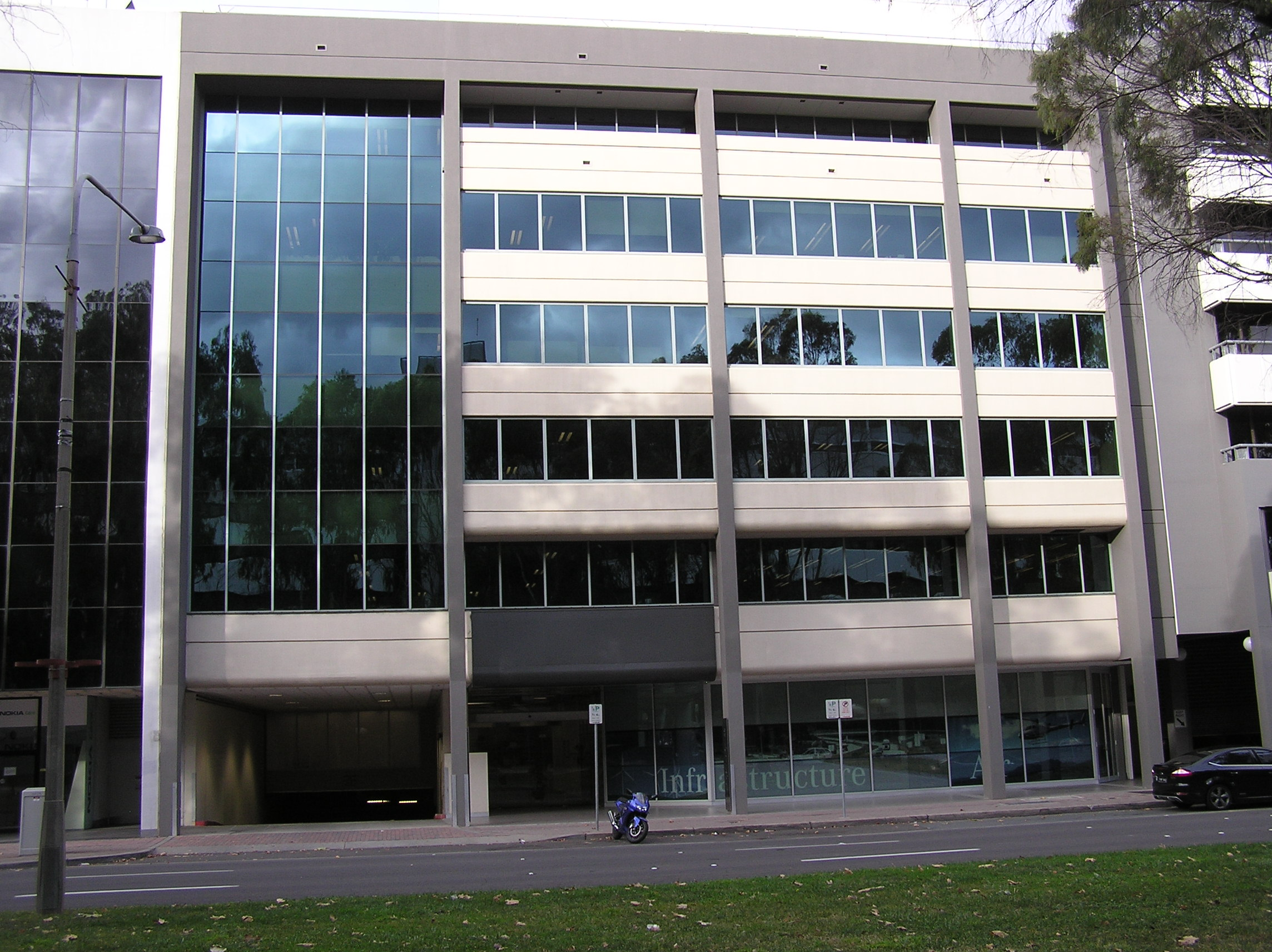
The building at 62 Northbourne Avenue in Canberra, which housed part of the Department of Infrastructure and Transport.

== Scope ==
Information about the department's functions and government funding allocation could be found in the Administrative Arrangements Orders, the annual Portfolio Budget Statements, in the department's annual reports and on the departmental website.

According to the Administrative Arrangements Order made on 14 September 2010, the department dealt with:

- Infrastructure planning and co-ordination
- Transport safety, including investigations
- Land transport
- Civil aviation and airports
- Transport security
- Maritime transport including shipping
- Major projects facilitation

== Intended outcomes of the department ==
The department worked to help the Government of the day achieve its policy objectives by contributing to, and reporting against two key outcomes. The 2011–12 departmental annual report identified the two outcomes as:

1. Improved infrastructure across Australia through investment in and coordination of transport and other infrastructure.
2. An efficient, sustainable, competitive, safe and secure transport system for all transport users through regulation, financial assistance and safety investigations.

== Functions of the department ==
=== Conducting analysis and research ===
The Bureau of Infrastructure, Transport and Regional Economics (BITRE) within the department provided economic analysis, research and statistics on infrastructure, transport and regional development issues to inform Australian Government policy development and wider community understanding.

=== Investing in infrastructure ===
The department coordinated transport and other infrastructure investment to support Australian economic productivity. The department worked with states and territories on transport and infrastructure planning to inform investment priorities of the day. A major component of infrastructure investment for the department was the Nation Building Program, with an annual administered expenses budget of $463 million in 2013–14.

The Major cities Unit (MCU) within the department contributed to infrastructure investment by providing advice to the Australian Government on issues of policy, planning and infrastructure that affected Australian cities and suburbs.

=== Supporting transport security ===
The department aimed to ensure a secure Australian transport system against the threat of terrorist attack. Legislation administered by the department mandated risk-based preventive security outcomes in the aviation, air cargo, maritime and offshore oil and gas sectors.

The Office of Transport Security (OTS) within the department was the Australian Government’s preventive security regulator for the aviation and maritime sectors, and its primary adviser on transport security.

=== Improving surface transport performance ===
Through the surface transport program, the department sought to improve the performance of the surface transport industry. Some of the activities undertaken by the department as part of this program included:

- working with state and territory governments to implement single rail, heavy vehicle and maritime national laws and national regulators;
- protecting sealife and the maritime environment through regulation and stakeholder engagement;
- establishing road safety policy aimed to improve heavy vehicle productivity and safety;
- administering several Tasmanian transport schemes, including the Tasmanian Freight Equalisation Scheme;
- conducting a review on Disability Standards for Accessible Public Transport; and
- working towards implementing mandatory CO_{2} emission standards for light vehicles from 2015.

=== Promoting road safety ===
Through the road safety program, the department aimed to contribute to the development of a safer road transport system by working to make vehicles and occupants safer, and drivers more informed. A key component of the road safety program was vehicle safety, the department regulated standards for road vehicles first entering the Australian market and through regulation delivered improved levels of vehicle safety, environmental performance and anti-theft protection.

=== Regulating air transportation ===
The department undertook a range of functions to ensure the aviation industry operated within a clear and robust safety regulatory environment and that Australian businesses and consumers had access to competitive international and domestic air services. Functions included supporting the aviation safety framework, expanding aviation markets and managing the Government’s interests in airport infrastructure.

== Departmental structure ==
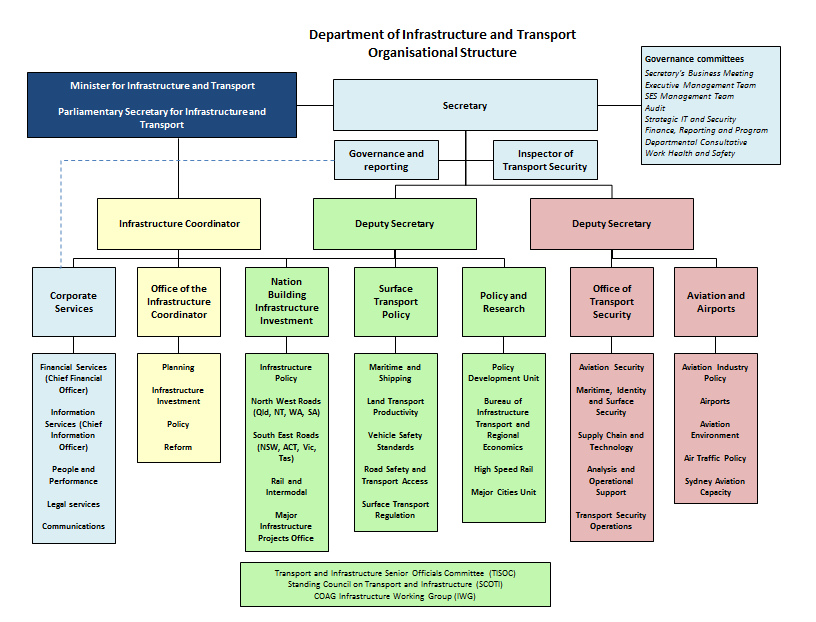
Organisation structure for the Department of Infrastructure and Transport, Australia (as at 2 March 2013).

The department was an Australian Public Service agency administered by a senior executive, comprising a secretary and two deputy secretaries.

The secretary was Mike Mrdak, appointed to the preceding Department of Regional Australia, Regional Development and Local Government on 29 June 2009. Mr Mrdak began his public sector career in 1988 as a Graduate with the then Department of Transport and Communications. He holds a bachelor's degree in arts along with a graduate diploma in economics.

In mid-2013, the department had a staff of around 994 people, of which around 836 were employed in Canberra and 15 were based overseas. Staff were employed as part of the Australian Public Service under the Public Service Act 1999. The workforce of the department had a reasonably even gender distribution (54% male, 46% female), but at more senior levels that ratio decreased. Around two-thirds of the department held a bachelor's degree or higher.

The department worked closely with several Australian Government agencies within its portfolio, including:

- the Australian Transport Safety Bureau (ATSB);
- the Australian Rail Track Corporation;
- Airservices Australia;
- the Australian Maritime Safety Authority;
- the Civil Aviation Safety Authority (CASA); and
- the National Transport Commission.

== Budget and finance ==
In the Department's 2013–14 budget statements, expenses were categorised as either departmental or administered expenses. Departmental expenses were those within the control of the relevant agency, whereas administered expenses were those administered on behalf of the Government. Expenses could be broken down as follows:

Program	Funding (billions)
Administered expenses through the Department of the Treasury	$4.627
Administered expenses through the Department of Infrastructure and Transport	$2.038
Departmental expenses	$0.212
Total	$6.877

=== Audit of expenditures ===
The department's financial statements were audited by the Australian National Audit Office.
