= Department of Infrastructure, Transport, Regional Development and Local Government =

Australian government department, 2007–2010

Department overview
- Formed: 3 December 2007
- Preceding Department: Department of Transport and Regional Services
- Dissolved: 14 September 2010
- Superseding Department: Department of Infrastructure and Transport Department of Regional Australia, Regional Development and Local Government
- Jurisdiction: Commonwealth of Australia
- Headquarters: Canberra
- Department executives: Mike Taylor, Secretary 2007–2009; Mike Mrdak, Secretary 2009–2010

The Department of Infrastructure, Transport, Regional Development and Local Government was an Australian Government department that existed between December 2007 and September 2010. The Department was established following the change of government at the November 2007 federal election, when the previous Department of Transport and Regional Services gained a third outcome.

== Functions ==
In an Administrative Arrangements Order made on 3 December 2007, the functions of the department were broadly classified into the following matters:

- Infrastructure planning and coordination
- Transport safety, including investigations
- Land transport
- Civil aviation and airports
- Transport security
- Delivery of regional and rural specific services
- Maritime transport including shipping
- Regional development
- Matters relating to local government
- Major projects facilitation

== Structure ==
During its life, the Department of Infrastructure, Transport, Regional Development and Local Government was accountable to Anthony Albanese as the Minister for Infrastructure, Transport, Regional Development and Local Government and to Gary Gray and Maxine McKew as parliamentary secretaries. Gray's title varied from the Parliamentary Secretary for Regional Development and Northern Australia (December 2007 to June 2009) to the Parliamentary Secretary for Western and Northern Australia (June 2009 to September 2010). McKew was the Parliamentary Secretary for Infrastructure, Transport, Regional Development and Local Government between June 2009 and September 2010.

The Department was headed by a Secretary, initially Mike Taylor, who stood down in March 2009, amid rumours of a falling out with the Rudd Government, and subsequently Mike Mrdak, who took on the role in June 2009.

== References and further reading ==
- Department of Infrastructure, Transport, Regional Development and Local Government (October 2008), Department of Infrastructure, Transport, Regional Development and Local Government Annual Report 2007–08 (PDF), Department of Infrastructure, Transport, Regional Development and Local Government, ISBN 978-1-921095-71-9, archived from the original (PDF) on 17 March 2012
- Department of Infrastructure, Transport, Regional Development and Local Government (October 2009), Department of Infrastructure, Transport, Regional Development and Local Government Annual Report 2008–09 (PDF), Department of Infrastructure, Transport, Regional Development and Local Government, ISBN 978-1-921095-91-7, archived from the original (PDF) on 17 March 2012
- Department of Infrastructure, Transport, Regional Development and Local Government (October 2010), Department of Infrastructure, Transport, Regional Development and Local Government Annual Report 2009–10 (PDF), Department of Infrastructure, Transport, Regional Development and Local Government, ISBN 978-1-921769-08-5, archived from the original (PDF) on 18 March 2012
- Department of Infrastructure and Transport (October 2011), Department of Infrastructure and Transport Annual Report 2010–11 (PDF), Department of Infrastructure and Transport, ISBN 978-1-921769-46-7, archived from the original (PDF) on 18 March 2012
