= Department of Transport and Regional Services =

Australian government department, 1998–2007

Department overview
- Formed: 21 October 1998
- Preceding Department: Department of Transport and Regional Development
- Dissolved: 3 December 2007
- Superseding Department: Department of Infrastructure, Transport, Regional Development and Local Government
- Jurisdiction: Commonwealth of Australia
- Department executives: Allan Hawke, Secretary 1998–1999; Ken Matthews, Secretary 1999–2004; Mike Taylor, Secretary 2004–2007
- Website: dotars.gov.au

The Department of Transport and Regional Services (DOTARS) was an Australian government department that existed between October 1998 and December 2007.

== Scope ==
Information about the department's functions and government funding allocation could be found in the Administrative Arrangements Orders, the annual Portfolio Budget Statements, in the Department's annual reports and on the departmental website.

According to the Administrative Arrangements Order made on 21 October 1998, the Department dealt with:

- Land transport (including road safety)
- Civil aviation and air navigation
- Aviation security
- Delivery of regional and rural specific services
- Maritime transport including shipping
- Regional development
- Matters relating to local government
- Planning and land management in the Australian Capital Territory
- Administration of the Jervis Bay Territory, the Territory of Cocos (Keeling) Islands, the Territory of Christmas Island, the Coral Sea Islands Territory, the Territory of Ashmore and Cartier Islands, and of Commonwealth responsibilities on Norfolk Island
- Constitutional development of the Australian Capital Territory
- Constitutional development of the Northern Territory of Australia

== Intended outcomes ==
The department worked to help the Government of the day achieve its policy objectives by contributing to, and reporting against key outcomes. The 2002–03 departmental annual report identified the Department's two key outcomes as:

- a better transport system for Australia; and
- greater recognition and development opportunities for local, regional and territory communities.

== Structure ==
The Department was an Australian Public Service department responsible to the Minister of the day. The Department was headed by a Secretary. The first Secretary of the Department was Allan Hawke, carrying on his role from the previous Department of Transport and Regional Development. In October 1999, the Prime Minister John Howard announced that Ken Matthews had been appointed as the Department's Secretary, to commence in November of that year. Mike Taylor took over the Secretary role from Matthews in 2004, after indicating to Prime Minister John Howard his strong interest in working in water reform at the National Water Commission.

=== Ministers and parliamentary secretaries ===
Ministers and parliamentary secretaries associated with the Department included:

- John Anderson, Minister for Transport and Regional Services
- Ian Macdonald, Minister for Regional Services, Territories and Local Government
- Ron Boswell, Parliamentary Secretary to the Minister for Transport and Regional Services
- Warren Truss, Minister for Transport and Regional Services
- Jim Lloyd, Minister for Local Government, Territories and Roads
- John Cobb, Parliamentary Secretary to the Minister for Transport and Regional Services

== References and further resources ==
- Department of Transport and Regional Services (October 2001), Department of Transport and Regional Services Annual Report 2000–01 (PDF), Department of Transport and Regional Services, ISBN 0-642-51884-X, archived from the original (PDF) on 20 March 2012
- Department of Transport and Regional Services (September 2002), Department of Transport and Regional Services Annual Report 2001–02 (PDF), Department of Transport and Regional Services, ISBN 0642502285, archived from the original (PDF) on 18 March 2012
- Department of Transport and Regional Services (September 2003), Department of Transport and Regional Services Annual Report 2002–03 (PDF), Department of Transport and Regional Services, ISBN 0-9751001-4-9, archived from the original (PDF) on 30 June 2004
- Department of Transport and Regional Services (November 2004), Department of Transport and Regional Services Annual Report 2003–04 (PDF), Department of Transport and Regional Services, ISBN 0-9757147-0-8, archived from the original (PDF) on 20 March 2012
- Department of Transport and Regional Services (October 2005), Department of Transport and Regional Services Annual Report 2004–05 (PDF), Department of Transport and Regional Services, ISBN 0-9757147-2-4, archived from the original (PDF) on 20 March 2012
- Department of Transport and Regional Services (September 2006), Department of Transport and Regional Services Annual Report 2005–06 (PDF), Department of Transport and Regional Services, ISBN 19210952-3-7, archived from the original (PDF) on 20 March 2012
- Department of Transport and Regional Services (October 2007), Department of Transport and Regional Services Annual Report 2006–07 (PDF), Department of Transport and Regional Services, ISBN 978-1-921095-62-7, archived from the original (PDF) on 19 March 2012
- Department of Infrastructure, Transport, Regional Development and Local Government (October 2008), Department of Infrastructure, Transport, Regional Development and Local Government Annual Report 2007–08 (PDF), Department of Infrastructure, Transport, Regional Development and Local Government, ISBN 978-1-921095-71-9, archived from the original (PDF) on 19 March 2012
