= Tasmanian Freight Equalisation Scheme =

Scheme between mainland Australia and Tasmania

From Australia to Tasmania

The Tasmanian Freight Equalisation Scheme is an Australian Government scheme to provide financial assistance to shippers of freight between Tasmania and mainland Australia. The scheme aims to assist in alleviating the sea freight cost disadvantage incurred by shippers of eligible non‐bulk goods moved between Tasmania and the mainland of Australia. It provides a freight subsidy to producers selling into Australian domestic markets, but not for exports outside of Australia.

The scheme was first announced by Gough Whitlam. It began in July 1976, following the submission of the Report of the Commission of Inquiry into Transport to and from Tasmania, which is also known as the Nimmo Report, by Commissioner James Nimmo.

Commencing 24 July 2024, the TFES was extended to include the transportation of drought-relief stockfeed to the Bass Strait islands. The amendment allows charitable organisations to receive assistance for sea freight costs for shipments from the mainland to King and Flinders islands, retroactive from 1 May 2023 until June 2025.

== Administration, budget and claimants ==
Administration of the Tasmanian Freight Equalisation Scheme is shared between the Department of Infrastructure and Regional Development and the Department of Human Services.

The Scheme is demand driven, and while an annual budget is set for the total assistance available for claimants, in practice there is no upper limit to the total annual payments that could be made to claimants. In 2010–11 the budget for the Scheme was A$114.4 million. The combined forward estimate for the Scheme over the four years to 2013–14 was $486 million. In 2010–11, 1,544 businesses and individuals lodged a total of 11,233 claims for assistance under the Scheme, resulting in the payment of a total of $100 million to eligible claimants.

For the 2000–10 period, freight headed north (to mainland Australia) accounted for approximately three-quarters of all claims. Major northbound commodities were newsprint, prepared vegetables and paper. Major commodities that were southbound were wood pulp, fodder/straw or pellets, and barley.

== Criticisms of the scheme ==
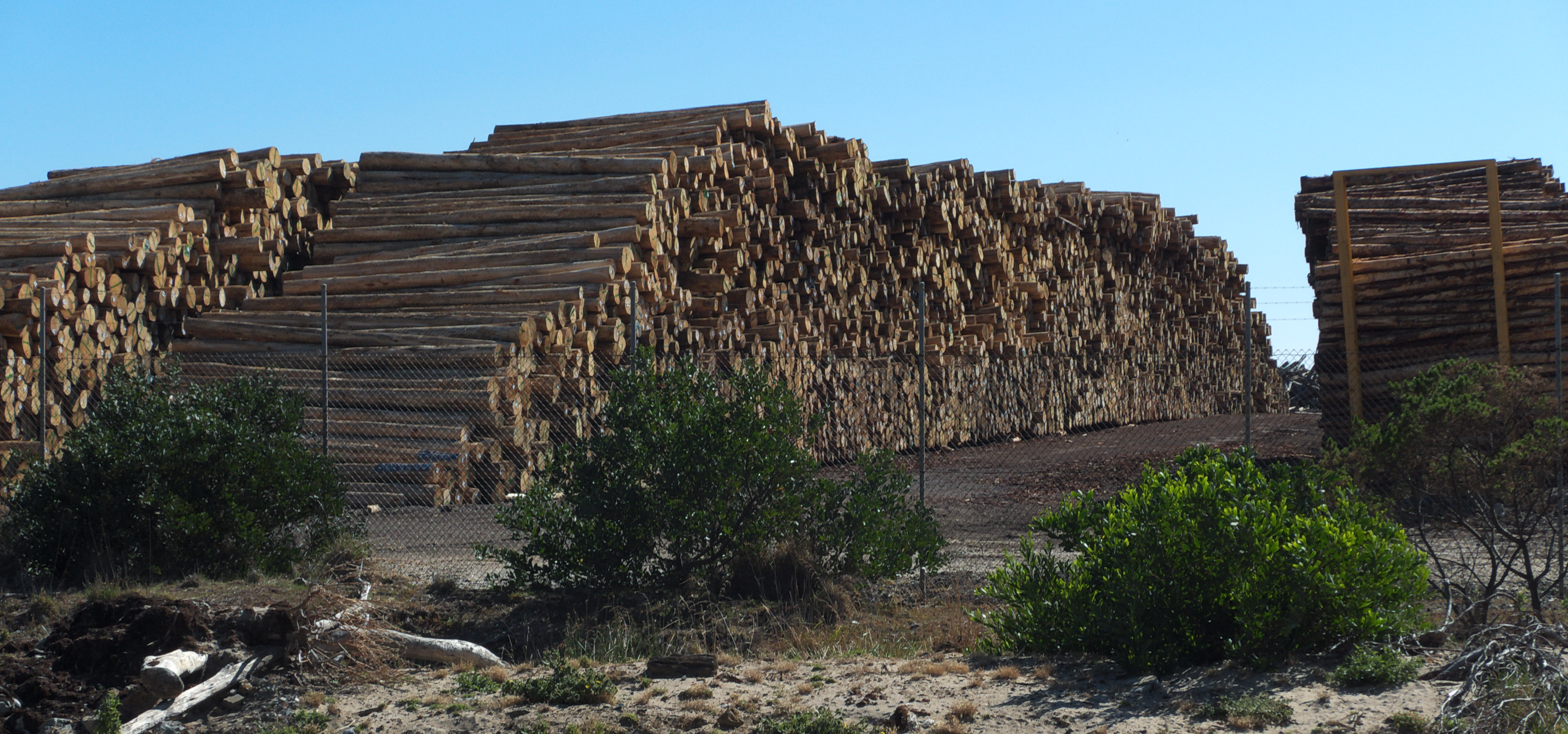
Logs piled at the Port of Burnie

On 6 February 2013, Tasmanian independent federal politician Andrew Wilkie called upon the Government to enhance the Tasmanian Freight Equalisation Scheme. Wilkie told the Parliament that the amount of money available under the scheme was inadequate and that the scope of the scheme was too narrow, given that goods bound for export are excluded, saying:

For example the boots made by Blundstone in Hobart must first be shipped to Melbourne before being transferred to overseas-bound vessels, but yet they attract no subsidy for the Bass Strait leg even though this constitutes about half of the total freight cost from Tasmania to North America and other destinations.

A month later, Leigh Titmus, the Managing Director of Webster Limited wrote that the scheme was inequitable and expressed his support for calls for assistance to be increased. Titmus claimed that, by extending the Tasmanian Freight Equalisation Scheme to include export as well as domestic freight, the Federal Government could help Tasmanian freight export businesses to remain viable. Titmus argued that if Tasmanian businesses were better placed to compete with businesses in the mainland, the state's high unemployment rate might drop to levels more comparable to those in the rest of Australia.

In the lead-up to the 2013 federal election, the Coalition promised a review of the scheme. After the election, the coalition government confirmed that they would be going ahead with a joint Productivity Commission and Australian Competition & Consumer Commission review of Tasmania's shipping costs. The review will look at the Tasmanian Freight Equalisation scheme, among other things, and will be completed by mid-2014. The Productivity Commission previously found in 2006 that the scheme discriminated against industries that could not tap it and did not operate as intended, but the Howard government announced the scheme was an important Australian Government program and could continue.

In 2012, Michael Deegan of Infrastructure Australia had labelled the scheme "reactive, disjointed, fragmented and costly" and possibly open to rorting.

In June 2014, a Productivity Commission inquiry found that "there is no coherent economic rationale for the TFES and it falls well short of what is needed to improve the lagging competitiveness of the Tasmanian economy." Despite the criticism, Prime Minister Tony Abbott was said to have given his personal assurances to retain the scheme shortly after the inquiry report was released.

=== International exports misconduct ===
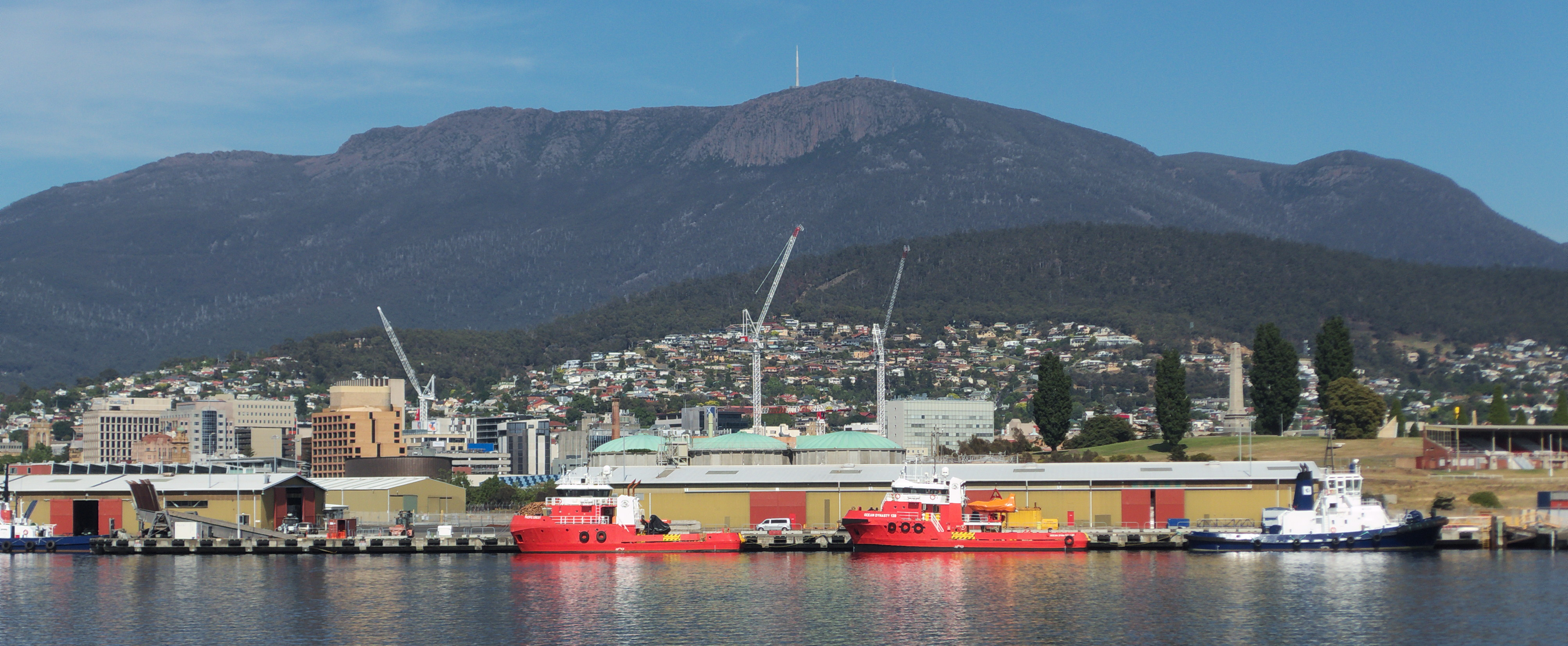
Macquarie Wharf, Hobart in 2017

In response to the Productivity Commission's report, in March 2015 the government announced that scheme would be expanded starting on 1 January 2016.

In 2016, the Federal Government expanded TFES to include international exports from Tasmania, provided they were shipped in containers through any Australian port. To get the subsidy of $700 per container (with 15% more for King Island/Furneaux Group Islands shippers), shipments had to travel through a mainland Australian port on its way overseas. This expansion aimed to support Tasmania's agricultural exports to Asian markets.

Majestic Timbers took advantage of this scheme by exporting low-value logs (residues) in containers from Hobart to Asia, thereby qualifying for the $700 per container subsidy. While this use of the scheme was technically compliant, it drew criticism, notably from Independent MHR Andrew Wilkie, who accused the state government of substituting state subsidies with federal funds.

Traditionally, wood residues were shipped as bulk commodities, but the closure of the Triabunna chip export facility in 2011 led to higher transport costs, making road-rail freight economically unfeasible. Sustainable Timber Tasmania had previously provided $5 million annually to support the industry. The government granted Majestic Timbers a contract to manage 180,000 tonnes annually for five years, with their business model heavily relying on the TFES subsidy.

Critics argued that applying TFES to low-value commodities might discourage the development of better uses for residues, raising concerns about the long-term financial viability of these practices. Despite the criticism, the Federal Infrastructure Minister maintained that Majestic's use of the scheme was appropriate. While the Tasmanian forestry sector has experienced stability and growth due to the private plantation sector and fewer protests, the challenge of finding sustainable uses for lower-value timber persists.

== Sources ==
- Australian National Audit Office (22 November 2011). Tasmanian Freight Equalisation Scheme. Australian National Audit Office. ISBN 978-0-642-81218-6. Archived from the original on 13 October 2012.
