= National Water Commission =

Australian government agency

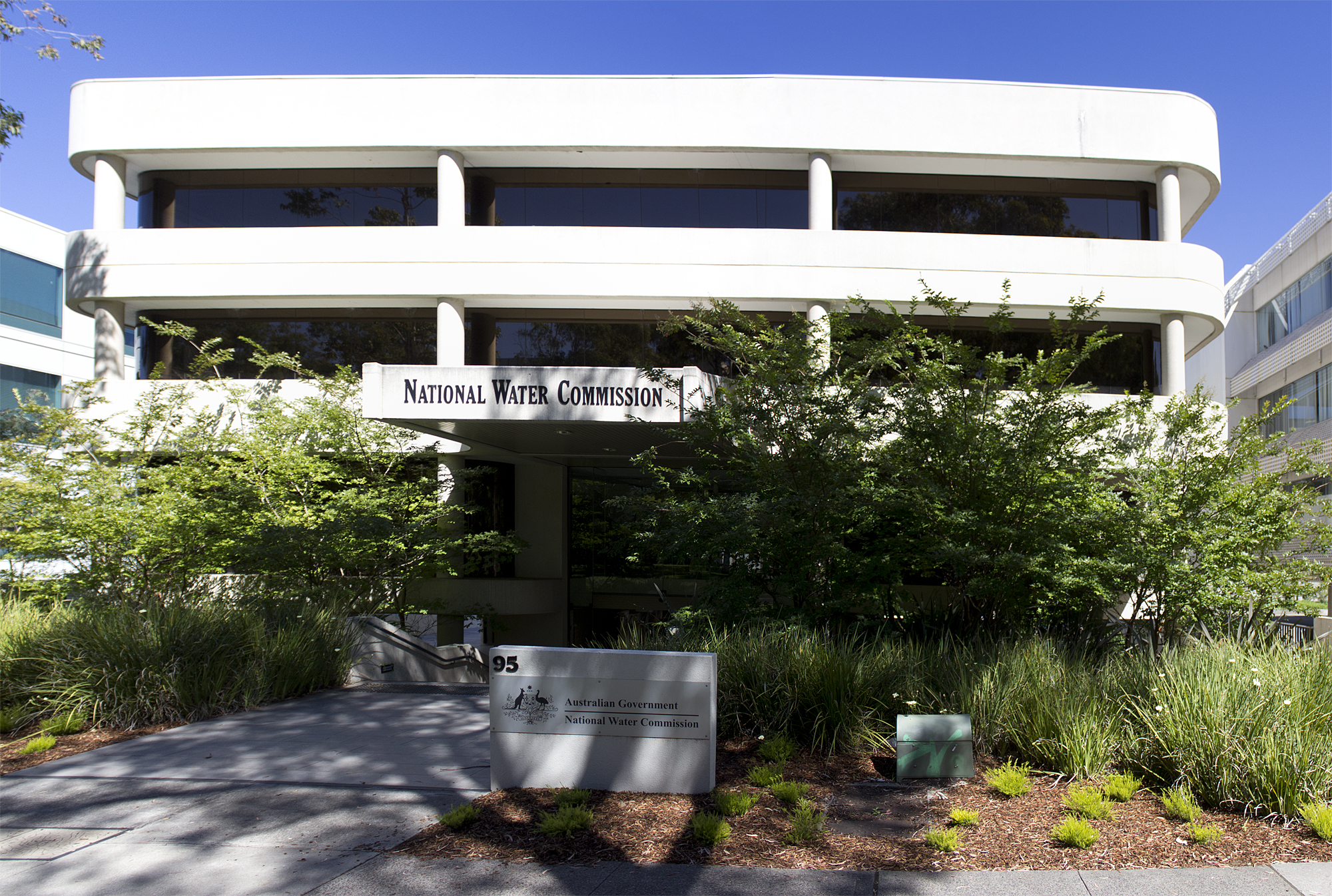
- National Water Commission building

statutory authority overview
- Dissolved: 25 November 2014
- Jurisdiction: Commonwealth of Australia
- Headquarters: Turner, Australian Capital Territory
- Motto: Australia's independent voice on national water issues
- Employees: 48
- statutory authority executives: Chairperson, Karlene Maywald; CEO, James Cameron
- Parent department: Department of Sustainability, Environment, Water, Population and Communities
- Key document: National Water Commission Act 2004
- Website: www.nwc.gov.au/home

The National Water Commission (NWC) was an independent statutory authority in Australia established by the National Water Commission Act 2004 to implement the National Water Initiative and reform the broader national water agenda. The agency was abolished by the Abbott government in 2014.

The Commission reported to the Department of Sustainability, Environment, Water, Population and Communities portfolio, and provided independent, evidence-based advice to the Council of Australian Governments (COAG) and the Australian Government on national water issues.

The Act was amended in June 2012 following an independent COAG Review of the Commission. Under the amended Act, the Commission had three core ongoing functions: monitoring, audit, and assessment. It was also empowered to undertake broader activities that promoted national water reform objectives. The Commission had additional functions under other Commonwealth acts and regulations:

- The Water Act 2007 assigned an ongoing function to audit the effectiveness of the implementation of the Murray–Darling Basin Plan and associated water resource plans. The Commission was required to conduct its first audit by March 2013 and subsequently no later than five years from the conduct of the first audit.
- In 2011, the Commission was delegated additional functions under the Carbon Credits (Carbon Farming Initiative) Regulations 2011.

== History ==
The key function of the Commission was to advise the Prime Minister on expenditure of the Australian Government Water Fund between 2004 and 2010. This included three programs: Water Smart Australia; Raising National Water Standards Program and Australian Water Fund Communities. The Commission managed more than 170 projects under the Raising National Water Standards Program. The Raising National Water Standards Program facilitated investment in Australia's ability to measure, monitor and manage its water resources.

The Commission also had an assessment role for National Partnership Payments. This task was undertaken under a delegation from the COAG Reform Council. Under the Water Act 2007, the Commission had a new, ongoing function to audit the effectiveness of implementation of the Murray-Darling Basin Plan and associated water resource plans.

The National Water Commission published a report on the future need for desalination technologies to play a role in securing Australia’s water supplies.

The Commission published biennial assessments of progress in implementation of the National Water Initiative. The 2011 assessment made 12 major recommendations to COAG to reinvigorate the water reform agenda and fully deliver its economic, environmental and social benefits.

== Commission abolished ==
The Commission was abolished by the National Water Commission (Abolition) Act 2015 in October 2014. The reason for disbanding the Commission was:

the substantial progress already made in water reform and the current fiscal environment, there is no longer adequate justification for a stand-alone agency to monitor Australia's progress on water reform.

The key functions of the Commission were transferred to other existing Commonwealth agencies, such as the Productivity Commission and the Department of Environment.

== See also ==
- Climate change in Australia#Water
- Irrigation in Australia
- Murray-Darling Basin Authority
- Water data transfer format
- Water supply and sanitation in Australia
