= Transport in New South Wales =

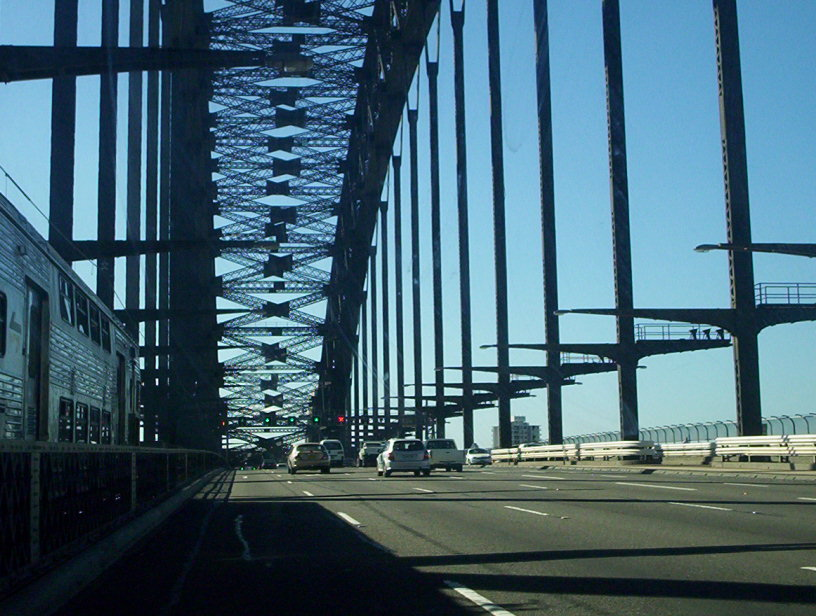
Traffic crossing the Sydney Harbour Bridge on the Bradfield Highway in Sydney

An extensive multi-modal transport system serves the state of New South Wales, Australia. The lead government agency responsible for the network's operation and development is Transport for NSW.

== Road ==
Transport for NSW is the main New South Wales Government agency responsible for major road infrastructure, licensing of drivers, and registration of motor vehicles. It directly manages State roads and provides funding to local councils for regional and local roads. In addition, with assistance from the federal government, Transport for NSW also manages the NSW national highway system.

Across the state, Transport for NSW manages 4,787 bridges and 17,623 km of state roads and highways including 3,105 km of National Highways.

== Rail ==
During the 20th century the railways were run by state-owned entity the New South Wales Government Railways and its successors. The current entity responsible for running the railways is Transport for New South Wales (TfNSW), with NSW TrainLink and Sydney Trains responsible for service provision and Transport Asset Manager of New South Wales being the infrastructure owner. Freight services were operated by the state government through FreightCorp until 2001, when this business was sold to Pacific National. Since 2003, the NSW interstate and Hunter Valley rail corridors, and the dedicated metropolitan freight lines to the Sydney ports have been under the control of the Australian Rail Track Corporation. The rest of the network outside of Sydney is maintained under contract by John Holland.

== Public transport ==
According to the New South Wales State Plan, the state has Australia's largest public transport system. Indeed, in the 1920s, Sydney also boasted the southern hemisphere's largest tram network. Public transport in Sydney accounts for almost double the share of commuter journeys in other state capitals. The network is regulated by TfNSW, which is working towards an integrated network serving Sydney, Newcastle, the Central Coast, the Blue Mountains, Wollongong, and the Illawarra.

== Taxis ==
New South Wales is served by a fleet of around 6,000 taxis. The industry employs over 22,000 taxi drivers. The network is the largest in Australia. Most taxis are Ford Falcons, Holden Commodores and Toyota Camrys, although a smaller number of Ford Fairlanes, Holden Statesman/Caprices and Toyota Priuses are in service. In general, taxis are required to run on liquid petroleum gas. In general, individual taxis are owned by small-scale operators who pay membership fees to regional or citywide radio communication networks. These networks provide branding as well as telephone and internet booking services to operators and drivers.

== Air ==
The major airport is Sydney Airport, located in the Eastern Suburbs. The Western Sydney Airport is scheduled to open in October 2026.

== Sea ==
Major seaport facilities are located at

- Port Jackson, in central Sydney
- Port Botany, in Sydney's south
- Port Kembla, south of Wollongong
- Port of Newcastle, at Newcastle, north of Sydney

Regional ports at Eden and Yamba are administered by Transport for NSW.
