= Department of Family and Community Services (Australia) =

Australian government department, 1998–2006

Department overview
- Formed: 21 October 1998
- Preceding Department: Department of Social Security; Department of the Treasury Attorney-General's Department Department of Health and Family Services
- Dissolved: 27 January 2006
- Superseding Department: Department of Families, Community Services and Indigenous Affairs
- Jurisdiction: Commonwealth of Australia
- Headquarters: Greenway, Canberra
- Employees: 5500 (at June 2000)
- Department executives: David Rosalky, Secretary (1998–2001); Mark Sullivan, Secretary (2002–2004); Jeff Harmer, Secretary (2004–2006)
- Website: facs.gov.au

The Department of Family and Community Services (also known as FaCS) was an Australian government department that existed between October 1998 and January 2006.

== Scope ==
Information about the department's functions and government funding allocation could be found in the Administrative Arrangements Orders, the annual Portfolio Budget Statements, the Department's annual reports and on the Department's website.

According to the Administrative Arrangements Order made on 21 October 1998, the Department dealt with:

- Income security policies and programs
- Services for people with disabilities and families with children
- Community support services, excluding the Home and Community Care program
- Family relationship services
- Welfare housing

== Structure ==
The Department was an Australian Public Service department, staffed by officials who were responsible to the Minister.

The Secretary of the Department was David Rosalky, until 2001 and then subsequently Mark Sullivan, until 2004 and then Jeff Harmer.
