= The a2 Milk Company =

New Zealand dairy company

The a2 Milk Company Limited
- Type: Public company
- Traded as: ASX: A2M; NZX: ATM; S&P/NZX 50 component; S&P/ASX 200 component
- Predecessor: A2 Corporation Limited
- Founded: 2000; 26 years ago in New Zealand
- Founders: Corran McLachlan; Howard Paterson
- Headquarters: Auckland, New Zealand
- Areas served: New Zealand, Australia, China, Hong Kong, Korea, Singapore, Canada, United States of America, United Kingdom
- Key people: David Bortolussi (CEO); David Hearn (Chairman)
- Products: A2 Milk, dairy, infant formula
- Revenue: ▼NZ$1.21 billion (2021)
- Operating income: ▼NZ$116.0 million (2021)
- Net income: ▼NZ$80.7 million (2021)
- Total assets: ▼NZ$1.37 billion (2021)
- Total equity: ▼NZ$1.08 billion (2021)
- Number of employees: ▲111 (2016)
- Website: www.thea2milkcompany.com

The a2 Milk Company Limited (previously known as A2 Corporation) is a New Zealand company that commercialises intellectual property relating to A1 protein-free milk that is sold under the a2 and a2 Milk brands, as well as the milk and related products such as infant formula. It is cross-listed in both the NZX and ASX.

== History ==
The a2 Milk Company is the successor of A2 Corporation Limited, a New Zealand company founded in 2000 by Dr Corran McLachlan, who was researching health effects of A1 beta-casein, and Howard Paterson, who was one of New Zealand's richest men, a significant dairy farmer, and a stakeholder in Fonterra, a dairy cooperative. The company commercialised a genetic test to determine whether a cow will produce milk without the A1 protein, and to market A1 protein-free milk.

Initially, A2 Corporation focused on dairy farm breeding programmes to develop herds that would produce only A1 protein-free milk. However the launch of A1 protein-free milk was delayed by opposition from Fonterra, which had protected contracts under New Zealand law with about 98% of New Zealand dairy farms. Seeking leverage in the battle with Fonterra over access to farmers, and over patent rights, Paterson led the company into litigation against Fonterra, asking the New Zealand High Court to order Fonterra to put health warnings on its conventional milk concerning risks of type 1 diabetes, heart disease, autism and schizophrenia due to the presence of A1 beta-casein, and to force Fonterra to publicly disclose all the information it had about the links between A1 beta-casein and health risks. The litigation threatened New Zealand's economy and international reputation as at the time Fonterra was responsible for 20% of New Zealand's exports. The press over the litigation and public concern over the claims of A2 Corporation led the New Zealand Food Safety Authority and the Ministry of Health and the Food Standards Australia New Zealand to issue statements confirming the safety of conventional milk.

A2 Corporation was able to obtain agreements with enough dairy farmers to launch A1 protein-free milk under its a2 and a2 MILK brands in New Zealand at the end of April 2003. In the middle of 2003, both founders of the company died. In July, Paterson was found dead in his hotel room during a business trip at the age of 50, and a month later Dr Corran McLachlan died of cancer at the age of 59. In New Zealand it is illegal to make health claims about a food product without providing scientific evidence and registering the food as a medicine, and in November 2003 the New Zealand Commerce Commission advised that A2 Corporation Ltd and its licensed producers of A1 protein-free milk had agreed to amend the health claims in their promotional material following a warning from the commission. By end of 2003 the weakened A2 Corporation had withdrawn the litigation against Fonterra and negotiations had resumed.

The company, which had been in a tenuous financial situation since beginning trading in May, went into administration in October and was liquidated in November, owing farmers and processors tens of thousands of dollars. A NZ$1.27 million federal government grant awarded to the company in August as part of the Regional Partnerships Program was also cancelled. A2 Corporation set up a new subsidiary and licensee, A2 Australia, to market and produce its product. A2 Australia established new contracts with the dairy farmers who had A1 protein-free herds, promising better payment terms—a week in advance instead of once per month, after shipment.

In December, A2 Corporation sold its interests in A2 Australia to Fraser & Neave, a food marketing giant in Asian markets, for about $1.1 million. A2 Corporation had lost about $1.3 million for 2004, the same as it has lost the year before; the sale allowed A2 Corporation to rely on Fraser & Neave to build the Australian and Asian businesses. A2 Corporation focused on recovering from the deaths of its founders organizationally and financially, relied on its New Zealand licensees to develop the New Zealand market, and turned its focus to developing overseas markets.

Between 2004 and 2006, A2 Corporation business continued to grow. In response, Dairy Australia (the national association of the Australian dairy industry) and market competitors such as Parmalat have consistently stated that there is no conclusive scientific evidence to suggest A1 proteins are dangerous and have warned that criticism of normal milk is damaging the entire dairy industry.

=== Reconsolidation and succession as The a2 Milk Company ===
In 2006, A2 Corporation was on a sound enough footing to buy back A2 Australia from Fraser & Neave. In 2006, it lost about $1 million, after having lost $9 million the year before, but revenues had approximately doubled. In that year it warned shareholders not to expect profit for another three years.

Commercial development proceeded, and by 2010 some 40 million litres of A1 protein-free milk were being produced by 12,000 A2-certified cows across Australia, with milk processed at four plants in Victoria, New South Wales and Queensland, and yoghurt made with A1 protein-free milk went on the market in Australia in April 2010 under the a2 and a2 MILK brands.

In February 2011 A2 Corporation announced it had a made a profit over a half-year for the first time; in the six months ending 31 December 2010, it made a net $894,000, or 17 cents per share.

In December 2012 A2 Corporation announced it would attempt to raise $20 million and list on the New Zealand Stock Exchange main board, and that it would use the funds to grow its Chinese infant formula and UK milk businesses. It listed in March 2013.

In 2015, A1 protein-free whole milk powder and A1 protein-free ice cream products were launched. For the 2014–2015 Financial year, The a2 Milk Company reported its Australian and New Zealand segment revenue grew by 40% vs pcp; and sales on a2 infant formula increased by 650%.

In December 2017 the company announced that in the summer of 2018 Geoffrey Babidge, who had been nearing retirement age, would step down and Jayne Hrdlicka would take over as CEO; at that time she was CEO of a subsidiary of Qantas. She took over in July 2018. At that time the company was experiencing strong growth via sales in China and had ramped up spending to further increase Chinese sales and to expand the US market. Hrdlicka resigned as CEO in December 2019, after her husband was found to have a kidney tumour. On her departure Geoffrey Babidge returned, as interim CEO.

In August 2020 David Bortolussi was appointed CEO and managing director.

== A2 milk ==
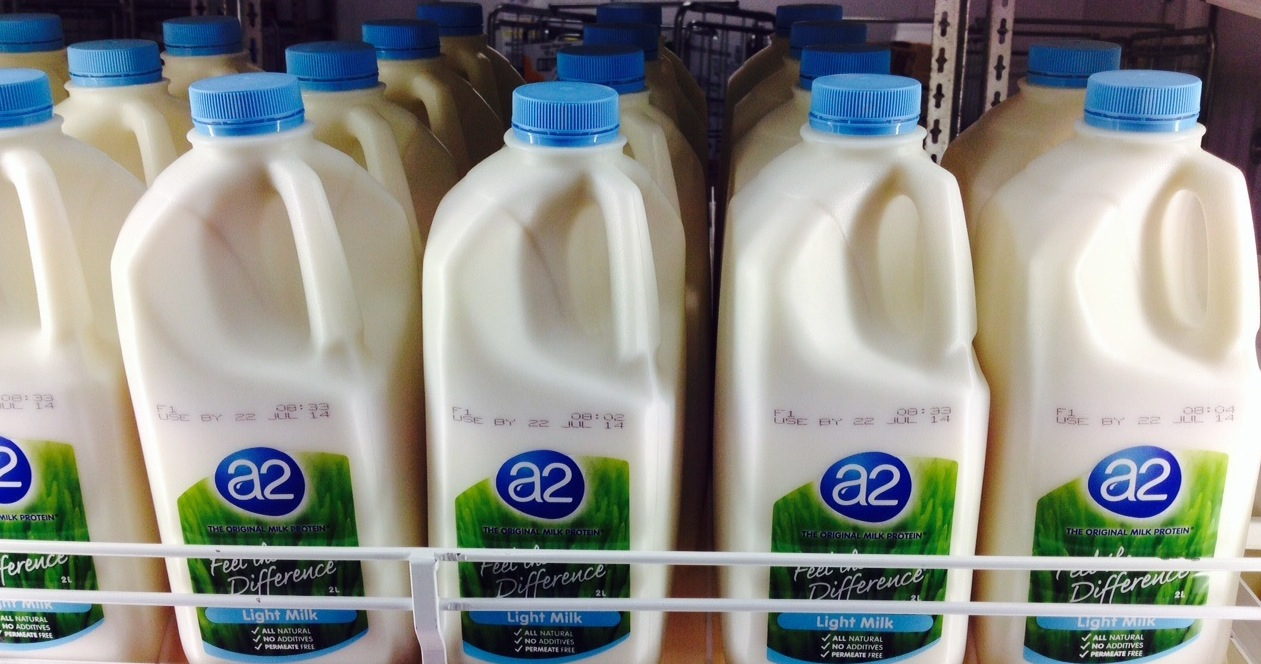
A2 milk on sale in New Zealand (2014)

The a2 Corporation claims that milk containing A1 proteins is harmful, but a 2009 European Food Safety Authority (EFSA) review of scientific literature found there was insufficient evidence to prove that bioactive peptides in standard milk have a negative effect on health.

A1 and A2 beta-casein are genetic variants of the beta-casein milk protein that differ by one amino acid. The A1 beta-casein type is the most common type found in cow's milk in Europe (excluding France), the US, Australia and New Zealand. A genetic test, developed by the A2 Milk Company, determines whether a cow produces the A2 or A1 type protein in its milk. The test allows the a2 Milk Company to license milk producers once proven their cows produce only A2 beta-casein protein in their milk, to the exclusion of the A1 beta-casein protein type.

== Intellectual property ==
A2 Corporation licensed patents filed in the 1990s by the New Zealand Dairy Board and filed its own patents on genetic tests to determine what form of beta-casein cows produce in milk and concerning potential adverse health consequences of standard milk.

By 2012 A2 Corporation had developed a worldwide suite of intellectual property, including trademarks, trade secrets, and patents covering products, the genetic test and methods to develop A1 protein-free producing herds, as well as methods to check the protein content and fatty acid content of milk, dietary supplements with A2 beta-casein, and even therapeutic uses of A1 protein-free products.

The a2 Milk Company continues to develop a portfolio of intellectual property, including trademarks and patents. The a2 Milk Company also invests in targeted research and development associated with the benefits of the A2 protein. In September 2017, it was reported that the a2 Milk Company got approval to keep selling its products in China.

== Markets ==
=== New Zealand and Australia ===
Sales of A1 protein-free milk in Australia and New Zealand boosted significantly following 2007, after the publication of a book, Devil in the Milk by Keith Woodford, about A1 beta-casein and its perceived dangers to health; the book prompted the New Zealand Food Safety Authority to propose again reviewing the science to address consumer concerns that milk containing both the A1 and A2 proteins might be harmful. It asked the European Food Safety Authority (EFSA) to undertake such a review. The EFSA report, released in 2009, found that "a cause and effect relationship is not established between the dietary intake of BCM7 (beta-casomorphin-7), related peptides or their possible protein precursors and non-communicable diseases".

The a2 Milk Company launched an infant formula in New Zealand and Australia in September 2013 and an A1 protein-free thickened cream was launched in January 2014 under the a2 and a2 MILK brands.

A2 Corporation changed its name to the a2 Milk Company Limited effective April 2014, and at that time had about 8% market share of the milk products market in Australia.

In 2014 Lion, a beverage and food company that operates in Australia and New Zealand and is owned by Kirin, relaunched its Pura Milk product with a new label stating: "Naturally contains A2 protein."

The a2 Milk Company announced in November 2014 that it had begun the application process for a dual listing on the Australian Securities Exchange in a bid to open its register to Australian investors and boost the liquidity of its shares. The company successfully listed in Australia on 30 March 2015.

=== United States ===
In August 2003, The a2 Milk Company exclusively licensed patent and trademark rights to US-based Ideasphere Incorporated (ISI) to market A1 protein-free products in North America. ISI acquired Twinlab in September 2003, followed by another string of acquisitions in the dietary supplement market. In June 2005, ISI and A2 Corporation agreed to form a joint venture, a2 Milk Company LLC.

In April 2007 A2 Corporation announced a deal in which the joint venture would license rights to the Original Foods Company, whose branding the A1 protein-free product would carry, and in which the product would be sold in several midwestern states through the Hy-Vee supermarket chain.

In A2 Corporation's 2009 Annual Report, the company announced that the joint venture had regained all rights to the US market through a settlement with the Original Foods Company. In 2010 The a2 Milk Company bought out more than 99% of ISI's share in the joint venture.

The a2 Milk Company is the owner of US trademarks that include the term A2 and/or A2 MILK for milk and other dairy related products, including a trademark for "a2 MILK." The a2 Milk Company announced in 2018 that it now had around 9,000 stores in its distribution network in the United States that sell its a2 and a2 MILK branded products.

=== United Kingdom ===
The a2 Milk Company formed a joint venture with a major British milk supplier, Müller Wiseman Dairies (MWD), in November 2011 to process, market and sell its A1 protein-free products in Britain and Ireland. In June 2014 The a2 Milk Company reported it had 20 dedicated farms supplying milk for processing in the UK. In its first year the milk recorded £1 million in sales through 1,000 stores. On 1 January 2014, The a2 Milk Company exited its joint venture with MWD by acquiring MWD's stake for a "nominal" amount.

In October 2019, the a2 Milk Company announced that it had decided to "discontinue a2 milk in the UK" and its products would only be available until the end of November 2019.

=== China ===
The first consignments of the a2 Milk Company infant formula – a2 Platinum were sent to China in 2013. Exports to China have increased dramatically following the 2008 Chinese milk scandal.

== See also ==
- Dairy farming in New Zealand
