= A2 milk =

Type of cows' milk

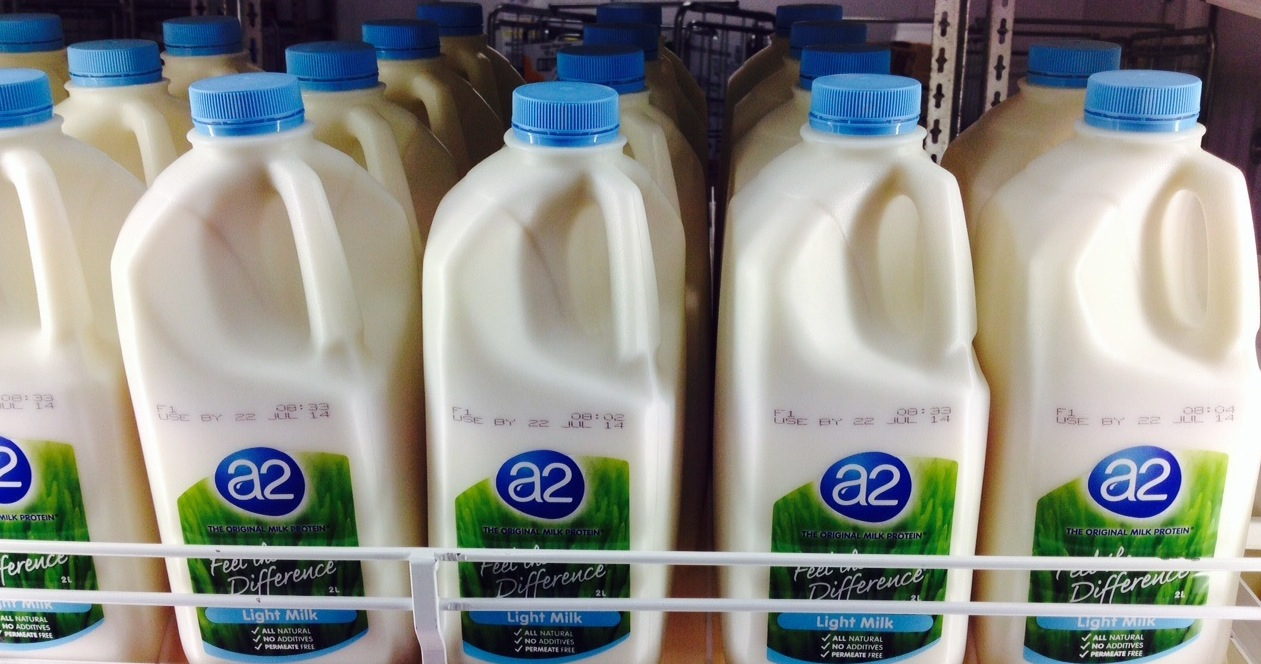
"a2"-branded milk on sale

A2 milk is a variety of cows' milk that predominantly contains the A2 form of β-casein proteins (as opposed to A1 milk, which contains mostly A1 β-casein proteins). Cows' milk like this was brought to market by The a2 Milk Company and is sold mostly in Australia, New Zealand, China, and the United States. It was sold in the United Kingdom between 2012 and 2019. Non-cow milk, including that of humans, sheep, goats, donkeys, yaks, camels, buffalo, and others, also contains mostly A2 β-casein, and so the term "A2 milk" is also used in that context.

The a2 Milk Company and some companies producing goat's milk products claim that milk containing A1 proteins is harmful, but there has been no widely accepted scientific work identifying a link between A1 protein and any adverse effect on health.

A1 and A2 beta-casein are genetic variants of the beta-casein milk protein that differ by one amino acid. A genetic test, developed by the a2 Milk Company, determines whether a cow produces A2 or A1 type protein in its milk.

== History ==
In the 1980s, medical researchers began to explore whether some peptides (including peptides from casein) that are created during digestion might have negative or positive health effects.

Interest in the distinction between A1 and A2 beta-casein proteins began in the early 1990s via epidemiological research and animal studies initially conducted by scientists in New Zealand, which found correlations between the prevalence of milk with A1 beta-casein proteins in some countries and the prevalence of various chronic diseases. The research generated interest in the media, as well as among the scientific community and entrepreneurs. If it were indeed true that BCM-7 is harming humans, this would be an important public health issue, as well as a commercial opportunity.

Cow milk is about 87 percent water and 13 percent solids, a combination of fat, carbohydrates in the form of lactose, minerals, and protein. About 30 to 35 percent of the casein (equivalent to two teaspoons per quart of milk) is beta-casein, of which there are several varieties, determined by the genes of the cow. The most common of these variants are A1 and A2 proteins, named for the order in which they were identified by scientists. The sole difference is that one of the 209 amino acids that make up the beta-casein proteins, a proline, occurs at position 67 in the chain of amino acids that make up the A2 beta-casein, while in A1 beta-casein, a histidine occurs at that position.

Studies in cells found that digestive enzymes that cut up proteins interact with beta-casein precisely at that location, so that A1 and A2 beta-casein proteins are processed differently. A seven-amino acid peptide, beta-casomorphin-7, can be cut away from the A1-beta-casein protein by those enzymes, but the enzymes cannot cut the A2 protein at that location, so BCM-7 is not formed from A2 proteins.

Studies in humans have not consistently found that BCM-7 is formed in the human digestive system. BCM-7 can also be created during the fermentation of milk or through the process by which cheese is made; those same processes can also destroy BCM-7.

Scientists believe the difference originated as a mutation that occurred between 5,000 and 10,000 years ago—as cattle were being taken north into Europe—when the proline at position 67 was replaced by histidine, with the mutation subsequently spreading widely throughout herds in the Western world through breeding.

The percentage of the A1 and A2 beta-casein protein varies between herds of cattle, and also between countries and provinces. While African and Asian cattle continue to produce only A2 beta-casein, the A1 version of the protein is common among cattle in the western world. The A1 beta-casein type is the most common type found in cow's milk in Europe (excluding France), the US, Australia and New Zealand. On average, more than 70 percent of Guernsey cows produce milk with predominantly A2 protein, while among Holsteins and Ayrshires between 46 and 70 percent produce milk containing both the A1 and A2 proteins.

=== A2 Corporation ===
The A2 Corporation was founded in New Zealand in 2000 to commercialise a genetic test to determine whether a cow will produce milk without the A1 protein, and to market the milk it produces as A2 or A2 MILK. In 2003, A2's website said: "Beta casein A1 may be a primary risk factor for heart disease in adult men, and also be involved in the progression of insulin-dependent diabetes in children" and the CEO had linked A1 to schizophrenia and autism. A2 Corporation also petitioned the Food Standards Australia New Zealand regulatory authority to require a health warning on ordinary milk.

The company initially marketed its milk as containing no A1 protein, but in 2003 the New Zealand Commerce Commission tested the milk and found some A1 protein in it, and forbade the company from saying the milk had no A1 protein. The commission notice of the ruling said: "Although the A2 Corporation expressed confidence during the investigation that its quality controls were sufficient to exclude the vast majority of beta casein A1, it acknowledged that it could not be certain that there was no A1 in A2 milk."

In April 2014, A2 Corporation changed its name to The a2 Milk Company Limited, and at that time had about 8% market share of the milk products market in Australia.

"A2 MILK" are trademarks held by the A2 Milk Company.

== Commercial production and sale ==
A2 Corporation licensed patents filed in the 1990s by the New Zealand Dairy Board, and filed its own patents on genetic tests to determine what form of beta-casein cows produce in milk, and concerning supposed adverse health consequences of milk containing both the A1 and A2 proteins.

=== Australia and New Zealand ===
The a2 Milk Company focused its initial efforts on urging farmers to undertake breeding programs to develop herds that would produce milk with predominantly A2 protein. The launch of the milk was delayed by opposition from Fonterra, which had contracts with about 98% of New Zealand dairy farms. These contracts were protected under New Zealand law by the Dairy Industry Restructuring Act of 2001.

Seeking leverage in the battle with Fonterra over access to farmers, and over patent rights, Howard Paterson, the CEO of A2 Corporation, led the company into litigation against Fonterra, asking the New Zealand High Court to order Fonterra to put health warnings on its conventional milk concerning risks of type 1 diabetes, heart disease, autism and schizophrenia due to the presence of A1 beta-casein, and to force Fonterra to publicly disclose all the information it had about the links between A1 beta-casein and health risks.

The litigation threatened New Zealand's economy and international reputation as at the time Fonterra was responsible for 20% of New Zealand's exports. The press over the litigation and public concern over the claims of A2 Corporation led the New Zealand Food Safety Authority and the Ministry of Health and the Food Standards Australia and New Zealand to issue reports and statements confirming the safety of conventional milk.

A2 Corporation obtained agreements with enough dairy farmers to launch its milk in New Zealand at the end of April 2003. In the middle of 2003, both founders of the company died. In July, Paterson was found dead in his hotel room during a business trip at the age of 50. A month later Dr. Corran McLachlan died of cancer at the age of 59. In New Zealand it is illegal to make health claims about a food product without providing scientific evidence and registering the food as a medicine, and in November 2003 the New Zealand Commerce Commission advised that A2 Corporation Ltd and its licensed a2 MILK brand producers had agreed to amend the health claims in their promotional material following a warning from the commission. By end of 2003 the weakened A2 Corporation had withdrawn the litigation against Fonterra and negotiations had resumed.

Meanwhile, the first time milk with predominantly A2 protein was marketed anywhere in the world was in March 2003 in Australia, by a dairy farm unaffiliated with A2 Corporation, run by the Denniston family. Shortly thereafter, an Australian company called A2 Dairy Marketers licensed patent rights and the A2 trademark from A2 Corporation and started offering Australian dairy farmers a premium price for their milk, if it was shown to be pure A1 protein-free milk. The Dennistons and A2 Dairy Marketers marketed milk with predominantly A2 protein boldly, touting its safety and the dangers of standard milk. However, Australian laws forbid companies from making misleading health claims about food and, in September 2004, A2 Dairy Marketers in Australia was fined $15,000 after it pleaded guilty to six breaches of those laws.

The company, which had been in a tenuous financial situation since beginning trading in May 2004, went into administration in October, and was liquidated in November, owing farmers and processors tens of thousands of dollars. A $1.27 million federal government grant awarded to the company in August as part of the Regional Partnerships Program was also cancelled. A2 Corporation set up a new subsidiary and licensee, A2 Australia, to market and produce its product. A2 Australia established new contracts with the dairy farmers who had A1 protein-free herds, promising better payment terms — a week in advance instead of once per month, after shipment.

In December, A2 Corporation sold its interests in A2 Australia to Fraser & Neave, a food marketing giant in Asian markets, for about $1.1 million. A2 Corporation had lost about $1.3 million for 2004, the same as it had lost the year before; the sale allowed A2 Corporation to rely on Fraser & Neave to build the Australian and Asian businesses. A2 Corporation focused on recovering from the deaths of its founders organizationally and financially, relied on its New Zealand licensees to develop the New Zealand market, and turned its focus to developing overseas markets.

As A2 Corporation grew its business, opposition to A2 Corporation's claims played out in the media. Dairy Australia, the national association of the Australian dairy industry, and market competitors like Parmalat have consistently said that there is no evidence to suggest A1 proteins are dangerous and have warned that criticism of normal milk is damaging the entire dairy industry.

In 2006, A2 Corporation was on sound enough footing to buy back A2 Australia from Fraser & Neave. In 2006, it lost about $1 million, after having lost $9 million the year before, but revenues had approximately doubled. In that year it warned shareholders not to expect profit for another three years.

Publication of a book, Devil in the Milk by Keith Woodford, about A1 beta-casein and its perceived dangers to health, boosted sales of milk with predominantly A2 protein in Australia and New Zealand, and prompted the New Zealand Food Safety Authority to propose again reviewing the science to address consumer concerns that A1 milk might be harmful. It asked the European Food Safety Authority (EFSA) to undertake such a review. The EFSA report, released in 2009, found that "a cause and effect relationship is not established between the dietary intake of BCM-7 (beta-casomorphin-7), related peptides or their possible protein precursors and non-communicable diseases".

Commercial development proceeded, and by 2010 some 40 million litres of milk with predominantly A2 protein were being produced by 12,000 A2-certified cows across Australia, with milk processed at four plants in Victoria, New South Wales, and Queensland, and yoghurt made with milk with predominantly A2 protein went on the market in Australia in April 2010.

In February 2011, A2 Corporation announced it had a made a profit over a half-year for the first time; in the six months ending 31 December 2010, it made a net $894,000, or 17 cents/share. In December 2012, A2 Corporation announced it would attempt to raise $20 million and list on the New Zealand Stock Exchange main board, and that it would use the funds to grow its Chinese infant formula and UK milk businesses under the a2 and a2 MILK brands. It listed in March 2013.

A2 Corporation changed its name to The a2 Milk Company Limited in April 2014, and at that time had about 8% market share of the milk products market in Australia.

Other products produced using milk with predominantly A2 protein were developed, including thickened cream, infant formula, ice cream, yogurts, and other dairy products.

In 2014, Lion, a beverage and food company that operates in Australia and New Zealand, and is owned by Kirin, relaunched their Pura Milk product with a new label stating: "Naturally contains A2 protein."

The a2 Milk Company announced in November 2014 that it had begun the application process for a dual listing on the Australian Securities Exchange in a bid to open its register to Australian investors and boost the liquidity of its shares. The company said it expected a listing to be completed by March 2015.

=== United States ===
In August 2003, as part of a new focus on overseas markets following the death of its founders, A2 Corporation exclusively licensed patent and trademark rights to US-based Ideasphere Incorporated (ISI) to market milk with predominantly A2 protein products in North America under its a2 and a2 MILK brands. ISI had paid A2 $500,000 in license fees by the end of 2004. ISI acquired Twinlab in September 2003, followed by another string of acquisitions in the dietary supplement market. In June 2005, ISI and A2 Corporation agreed to form a joint venture, A2 Milk Company LLC. A2 Corporation invested $400,000, and ISI assigned the license agreement to the new company.

In April 2007, A2 Corporation licensed rights to the Original Foods Company, whose branding the milk with predominantly A2 protein product would carry, and in which the product would be sold in several midwestern states through the Hy-Vee supermarket chain under the a2 and a2 MILK brands.

In 2009, A2 Corporation regained all rights to the US market through a settlement with the Original Foods Company, and announced that "The US dairy milk market remains intensely competitive and continues to be a major challenge." In 2010, A2 Corporation bought out all but less than 1% of ISI's share in the joint venture.

Braum's, a chain of dairy and fast-food stores found mostly in the American Southwest, independently developed a herd of A2 cattle at its primary farm in Tuttle, Oklahoma over a period of 12 years. Since 2020, the company exclusively sells A2 milk to consumers and also uses it in other dairy products, such as ice cream and cheese.

=== United Kingdom ===
A2 Corporation formed a joint venture with a major British milk supplier, Müller Wiseman Dairies, in November 2011 to process, market, and sell its milk with predominantly A2 protein products in Britain and Ireland. In June 2014, the a2 Milk Company reported it had 20 dedicated farms supplying milk for processing in the UK. In its first year, the milk recorded £1 million in sales through 1,000 stores. In January 2014, the a2 Milk Company exited its joint venture with Müller Wiseman Dairies by acquiring MWD's stake for a "nominal" amount.

In October 2019, the a2 Milk Company announced that it had decided to "discontinue a2 milk in the UK" and its products would only be available until the end of November 2019.

=== China ===
The first consignments of the a2 Milk Company's infant formulas were sent to China in 2013. Shipments were interrupted for two months starting in April 2014 when the Chinese government introduced strict new import regulations for infant formula in response to the 2008 Chinese milk scandal, in which more than 300,000 infants were poisoned by contaminated milk formula.

In 2018, the a2 Milk Company was fined 100,100 yuan for breaching Chinese child image advertising rules by using An Ji, son of Hu Ke and Sha Yi, in their advertising when he was under 10.

=== Brazil ===
The Brazilian Association of Allergy and Immunology found that about 350,000 individuals in Brazil are allergic to beta-caseins. As of 2017, about 700 litres of milk a day were produced in Brazil through Gir cows, a breed originally procured from India, but which are now also being exported to India.

=== Turkey ===
In Turkey, A2 milk is sold as "Jersey" milk primarily by the company Elta Ada which operates an organic farm located on the island of Gökçeada in the province of Çanakkale.

== Health effects ==
The European Food Safety Authority (EFSA) reviewed the scientific literature and published their results in 2009. As part of their evaluation, the EFSA looked at the laboratory studies that had been done on bovine β-casomorphin 7 (BCM-7) that found that BCM-7 can act as a weak opioid receptor agonist. The EFSA found no relationship between any disease and drinking milk with the A1 protein.

In most of the animal studies, BCM-7 was not administered orally, as humans would be exposed to it, but rather was given to animals by injection into the peritoneal cavity or directly into the spinal cord or brain. The EFSA study emphasized the dangers of drawing conclusions from correlations identified in epidemiological studies and the dangers of not reviewing all the evidence at hand. Reviews conducted in 2005 and 2009 found no demonstration that consuming milk with A1 casein causes diabetes.

A 2014 review of research into the relationship between consumption of dairy products (including A1 and A2 proteins) and the incidence of diabetes found that while there appears to be a positive correlation between consumption of dairy products by babies and the incidence of type 1 diabetes (T1D), and an inverse relationship between the consumption of dairy products and the development of type 2 diabetes (T2D), these correlations are tentative; it would be very difficult to determine which component or components of milk might be responsible for these effects, and it is unlikely that the expensive and complex research to determine the answers to these questions will ever be conducted.

Milk with predominantly A2 protein is not a milk substitute for infants with cow milk protein allergies.

The a2 Milk Company claims that "Research shows that a2 Milk™ can help to reduce digestive discomfort in some people who have difficulty digesting ordinary cow's milk." A 2023 study from Purdue University, with funding from The a2 Milk Company, showed a significant difference in gastric emptying time for A2 milk and such a difference was believed to be associated with a lower rate of indigestion.
