= Andre Agassi =

American tennis player (born 1970)

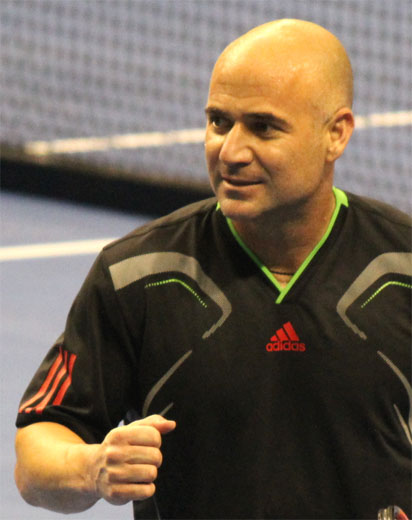
- Agassi at the 2011 Champions Shootout
- Full name: Andre Kirk Agassi
- Country (sports): United States
- Born: April 29, 1970 (age 56) Las Vegas, Nevada, US
- Height: 5 ft 11 in (1.80 m)
- Turned pro: 1986
- Retired: 2006
- Plays: Right-handed (two-handed backhand)
- Coach: Mike Agassi (1970–1983); Nick Bollettieri (1983–1993); Brian Teacher (1990s); Pancho Segura (1993); Brad Gilbert (1994–2002); Darren Cahill (2002–2006)
- Prize money: US$31,152,975: 17th all-time in earnings
- Int. Tennis HoF: 2011 (member page)

Singles
- Career record: 870–274 (76.0%)
- Career titles: 60
- Highest ranking: No. 1 (April 10, 1995)

Grand Slam singles results
- Australian Open: W (1995, 2000, 2001, 2003)
- French Open: W (1999)
- Wimbledon: W (1992)
- US Open: W (1994, 1999)

Other tournaments
- Tour Finals: W (1990)
- Olympic Games: W (1996)

Doubles
- Career record: 40–42 (48.8%)
- Career titles: 1
- Highest ranking: No. 123 (August 17, 1992)

Grand Slam doubles results
- French Open: QF (1992)
- US Open: 1R (1987)

Team competitions
- Davis Cup: W (1990, 1992, 1995)

Coaching career (2017–2020)
- Novak Djokovic (2017–2018); Grigor Dimitrov (2018–2020)

Medal record
Representing United States
Olympic Games – Tennis
Gold medal – first place	1996 Atlanta	Singles

Andre Kirk Agassi (/ˈæɡəsi/ AG-ə-see; born April 29, 1970) is an American former professional tennis player. He was ranked as the world No. 1 in men's singles by the Association of Tennis Professionals (ATP) for 101 weeks, including as the year-end No. 1 in 1999. Agassi won 60 ATP Tour-level singles titles, including eight majors, an Olympic gold medal, the 1990 ATP Tour World Championships, and 17 Masters titles, and he was part of the winning United States Davis Cup teams in 1990, 1992 and 1995. Agassi is one of nine men to complete the career Grand Slam in singles, and one of three men to complete the career Golden Slam in singles.

A teenage phenomenon, Agassi contested multiple major finals before winning his first at the 1992 Wimbledon Championships. His ranking dropped afterward due to surgery, but he recovered and won the 1994 US Open and 1995 Australian Open to reach the world No. 1 ranking for the first time. He was then troubled by personal issues during the mid-to-late 1990s, and despite an Olympic gold medal at the 1996 Atlanta Olympics, Agassi's ranking declined to as low as No. 141 in 1997, prompting many to believe that his career among the elite was over. Following a rigorous training regimen, Agassi then enjoyed the most successful run of his career over the next several years. He returned to the world No. 1 position in 1999 after completing the career Golden Slam at the French Open, and during this latter half of his career also claimed a US Open title and three Australian Open titles. Competing well into the 2000s, Agassi retired from the sport following the 2006 US Open.

Agassi is regarded by many as one of the greatest tennis players of all time. He was the first man to win all four singles majors across three different surfaces (hard, clay and grass), and remains the most recent American man to win the French Open (in 1999) and the Australian Open (in 2003). During his 20-plus year tour career, Agassi was known as "the Punisher" due to his excellent return of serve. Outside of tennis, he is the founder of the Andre Agassi Charitable Foundation, which has raised over $60 million for at-risk children in Southern Nevada. In 2001, the Foundation opened the Andre Agassi College Preparatory Academy in Las Vegas, a K–12 public charter school for at-risk children. He has been married to fellow tennis player Steffi Graf since 2001.

== Early life ==
Andre Agassi was born in Las Vegas, Nevada, to Emmanuel "Mike" Agassi (né Aghasi), a former Olympic boxer and casino worker of Armenian descent from Tehran, Iran, and American Elizabeth "Betty" Agassi (née Dudley). Agassi's paternal grandfather was born in Kiev, Ukraine and left for Russia to start a carpentry business in Saint Petersburg, before escaping to Iran in the 1920s following political unrest in Russia. His parents married in 1959 after dating for two months, then moved from Chicago to Las Vegas. He has three older siblings: Rita (who was married to former number one tennis player Pancho Gonzales), Philip and Tami. Andre was given the middle name Kirk after Kirk Kerkorian, an American businessman. Emmanuel Agassi, then a waiter at the Tropicana Las Vegas, had met his employer Kerkorian in 1963 and they became friends.

At the age of 12, Agassi and his good friend and doubles partner, Roddy Parks, won the 1982 National Indoor Boys 14s Doubles Championship in Chicago. Agassi describes memorable experiences and juvenile pranks with Roddy in his book Open.

When he was 13, Agassi was sent to Nick Bollettieri's Tennis Academy in Florida. He was supposed to stay for only three months, because that was all his father could afford. After 30 minutes of watching Agassi play, Bollettieri, deeply impressed by his talent, called Mike and said: "Take your check back. He's here for free." Agassi then dropped out of school in the ninth grade to pursue a full-time tennis career.

== Career ==
=== 1986–1989: World number 3 as a teenager ===
Agassi turned professional at the age of 16 and competed in his first tournament at La Quinta, California. He won his first match against John Austin, but then lost his second match to Mats Wilander. By the end of 1986, Agassi was ranked No. 91. He won his first top-level singles title in 1987 at the Sul American Open in Itaparica and ended the year ranked No. 25.

In addition to not playing the Australian Open (which later became his best Grand Slam event) for the first eight years of his career, Agassi chose not to play at Wimbledon from 1988 to 1990 (although he first played there in 1987, only to lose in the first round to Henri Leconte) and publicly stated that he did not wish to play there because of the event's traditionalism, particularly its "predominantly white" dress code to which players at the event are required to conform.

Strong performances on the tour meant that Agassi was quickly tipped as a future Grand Slam champion. Agassi reached the 1988 French Open semi finals before losing to Mats Wilander. "I've learned I have to do a lot about my serve and groundstrokes. But next year I'll be playing better than this year and better the year after that" said Agassi afterwards. At the US Open, Agassi lost in four sets to Ivan Lendl. "The power and steadiness of Lendl's strokes were too much for the 18-year-old Agassi to overcome". He won six tournaments in 1988 (Memphis, U.S. Men's Clay Court Championships, Forest Hills WCT, Stuttgart Outdoor, Volvo International and Livingston Open), and, by December of that year, he had surpassed US$1 million in career prize money after playing in just 43 tournaments—the fastest anyone in history had reached that level. During 1988, he also set the open-era record for most consecutive victories by a male teenager (a record that stood for 17 years until Rafael Nadal broke it in 2005). His year-end ranking was No. 3, behind second-ranked Ivan Lendl and top-ranked Mats Wilander. Both the Association of Tennis Professionals and Tennis magazine named Agassi the Most Improved Player of the Year for 1988.

At the 1989 French Open, Agassi lost in four sets in the third round to Bollettierri stable-mate Jim Courier, who "beat Agassi at his own game". At the US Open, Agassi won a five set match for the first time when he beat veteran Jimmy Connors in the quarter finals, with the crowd "firmly against him, even applauding his double faults". He lost to Lendl in four sets in the semi finals. He ended the year ranked 7.

=== 1990–1991: First major final ===
He began the 1990s with a series of near-misses. He reached his first Grand Slam final in 1990 at the French Open, where he was favored before losing in four sets to Andrés Gómez, which he later attributed in his book to worrying about his wig falling off during the match. He reached his second Grand Slam final of the year at the US Open, defeating defending champion Boris Becker in the semi-finals. His opponent in the final was Pete Sampras; a year earlier, Agassi had crushed Sampras, after which time he told his coach that he felt bad for Sampras because he was never going to make it as a pro. Agassi lost the US Open final to Sampras in three sets. The Agassi-Sampras rivalry would evolve into the biggest rivalry in tennis over the next decade+. Agassi ended 1990 on a high note as he helped the United States win its first Davis Cup in 8 years on home soil against Australia (3–2) and won his only Tennis Masters Cup, beating reigning Wimbledon champion Stefan Edberg in the final. He ended the year ranked 4.

In 1991, Agassi reached his second consecutive French Open final, where he faced fellow Bollettieri Academy alumnus Courier. Courier emerged the victor in a five-set final. The Las Vegan was a set and 3–1 up when came the rain. The rain delay proved to be a confidence builder for Courier. Agassi decided to play at Wimbledon in 1991, leading to weeks of speculation in the media about the clothes he would wear. He eventually emerged for the first round in a completely white outfit. He reached the quarterfinals on that occasion, losing in five sets to David Wheaton. He ended the year ranked 10.

=== 1992–1993: First major title ===
At the 1992 French Open, Agassi lost in straight sets to Courier in the semi-finals. Courier "demoralized Agassi from the start with implacable calm and brutal groundstrokes". Agassi hired Brian Teacher to serve as his traveling coach, after observing that opponents were frequently serving aces against him. Teacher adjusted Agassi's service return positioning and anticipation metrics, and changed Agassi's footwork to minimize the size of his split-step hop when reading an opponent's serve.

At Wimbledon, Agassi overcame two former Wimbledon champions, Boris Becker and John McEnroe, and then defeated Goran Ivanišević in a five-set final. No other baseliner would triumph at Wimbledon until Lleyton Hewitt ten years later. "This tournament has offered me and my life so much. It's a shame that I didn't respect it a little earlier" said Agassi after winning the event. Agassi lost again to Courier, this time in the quarter finals of the 1992 US Open in four sets (Courier served 22 aces). Agassi was named the BBC Overseas Sports Personality of the Year in 1992. Agassi once again played on the United States' Davis Cup winning team in 1992, remaining undefeated in singles throughout the year. It was their second Davis Cup title in three years. Agassi famously played the game wearing Oakley brand sunglasses, and a photo of him from the day appeared on the cover of Tennis magazine. In his memoir, he wrote that he was covering up bloodshot eyes from a hangover and claimed that the founder of Oakley, Jim Jannard, had sent him a Dodge Viper to thank him for the inadvertent publicity. He ended the year ranked 9.

In 1993, Agassi won the only doubles title of his career, at the Cincinnati Open, partnered with Petr Korda. He missed much of the early part of that year due to injuries. Although he made the quarterfinals in his Wimbledon title defense, he lost to eventual champion and No. 1 Pete Sampras in five sets. Agassi lost in the first round at the US Open to Thomas Enqvist and required wrist surgery late in the year. Due to an injury-plagued season, he ended the year ranked 24.

=== 1994–1995: Rise to the top ===
With new coach Brad Gilbert on board, Agassi began to employ more of a tactical, consistent approach, which fueled his resurgence. He started slowly in 1994, losing in the first week at the French Open and Wimbledon, although he did receive a much-needed confidence boost after defeating Mark Petchey at the Miami Open in March. Nevertheless, he emerged during the hard-court season, winning the Canadian Open. His comeback culminated at the 1994 US Open with a five-set fourth-round victory against Michael Chang. He then became the first man to capture the US Open as an unseeded player, beating Michael Stich in the final. Along the way, he beat five seeded players. He ended the year ranked 2.

In 1995, Agassi shaved his balding head, breaking with his old "image is everything" style. He competed in the 1995 Australian Open (his first appearance at the event) and won, beating defending champion Sampras in a four-set final. Plagued by a painful hip, Agassi lost in the French Open quarter-finals in straight sets to Yevgeny Kafelnikov. Agassi lost to Boris Becker in the Wimbledon semi finals, despite leading by a set and two breaks at 4–1. "Nobody should underestimate me; he did a major mistake at 4–1 when he didn't finish me off" said Becker afterwards. Agassi compiled a career-best 26-match winning streak during the summer hard-court circuit, with the last victory being in an intense late-night four-set semi-final of the US Open against Becker. The streak ended the next day when Agassi lost the final to Sampras. Agassi admitted this loss, which gave Sampras a 9–8 lead in their head-to-head meetings, took two years for him to get over mentally. Agassi and Sampras met in five tournament finals in 1995, all on hardcourt, with Agassi winning three. Agassi won three Masters Series events in 1995 (Cincinnati, Key Biscayne, and the Canadian Open) and seven titles total.

Agassi reached the world No. 1 ranking for the first time in April 1995. He held that ranking until November, for a total of 30 weeks. Agassi skipped most of the fall indoor season which allowed Sampras to surpass him and finish ranked No. 1 at the year-end ranking. In terms of win–loss record, 1995 was Agassi's best year. He won 73 and lost 9 matches, and was also once again a key player on the United States' Davis Cup winning team—the third and final Davis Cup title of his career.

=== 1996–1998: Decline, fall to world No. 141 and revival ===
Agassi was less successful in 1996, as he failed to reach any Grand Slam final. He suffered two early-round losses to Chris Woodruff and Doug Flach at the French Open and Wimbledon, respectively, and lost to Chang in straight sets in the Australian and US Open semi-finals. At the time, Agassi blamed the Australian Open loss on the windy conditions, but later said in his biography that he had lost the match on purpose, as he did not want to play Boris Becker, whom he would have faced in that final. The high point for Agassi was winning the men's singles gold medal at the Olympic Games in Atlanta, beating Sergi Bruguera of Spain in the final. Agassi also successfully defended his singles titles in Cincinnati and Key Biscayne. He ended the year ranked 8.

The low point of Agassi's career came in 1997. His wrist injury resurfaced, and he played only 24 matches during the year. Some years later he confessed that he used crystal methamphetamine during that time, allegedly at the urging of a friend. He failed an ATP drug test, but wrote a letter claiming the same friend had spiked a drink. The ATP dropped the failed drug test as a warning. In his autobiography, Agassi admitted that the letter was a lie. He quit the drug soon after. At this time Agassi was also in a failing marriage with actress, model, and socialite Brooke Shields and had lost interest in the game. He won no top-level titles, and his ranking sank to No. 141 on November 10, 1997, prompting many to believe that his run as one of the sport's premier competitors was over and he would never again win any significant tournaments.

In 1998, Agassi began a rigorous conditioning program and worked his way back up the rankings by playing in Challenger tournaments. During that year, Agassi leapt from No. 110 to No. 6, the highest jump into the top 10 made by any player during a calendar year. At Wimbledon, he had an early loss in the second round to Tommy Haas. He won five titles in ten finals and was runner-up at the Masters Series tournament in Key Biscayne, losing to Marcelo Ríos, who became No. 1 as a result. Despite not winning any majors, he was awarded the ATP Most Improved Player of the Year for the second time in his career (the first having been 10 years earlier in 1988).

=== 1999–2000: Return to glory and Career Super Slam ===
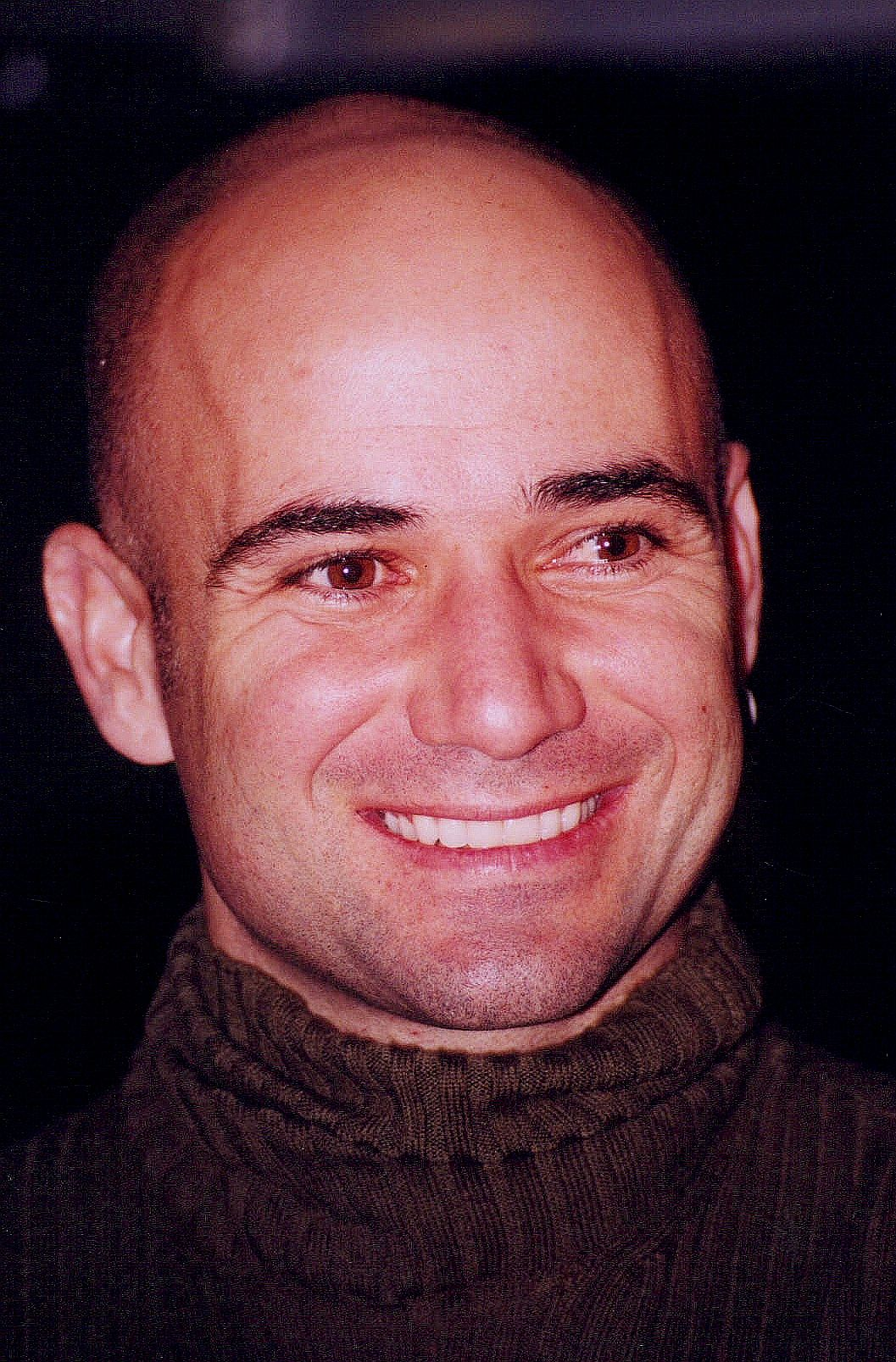
Agassi in 1999

Agassi entered the history books in 1999 when he came back from two sets to love down to beat Andrei Medvedev in a five-set French Open final, becoming, at the time, only the fifth male player (joining Rod Laver, Fred Perry, Roy Emerson and Don Budge—these have since been joined by Roger Federer, Rafael Nadal, Novak Djokovic, and Carlos Alcaraz) to win all four Grand Slam singles titles during his career. This win also made him the first (of only five, the next being Federer, Nadal, Djokovic and Alcaraz respectively) male player in history to have won all four Grand Slam titles on three different surfaces (clay, grass and hard courts). Agassi also became the first male player to win the Career Super Slam, consisting of all four Grand Slam tournaments plus an Olympic gold medal in singles and a Year-end championship.

Agassi followed his 1999 French Open victory by reaching the Wimbledon final, where he lost to Sampras in straight sets. He won the US Open, beating Todd Martin in five sets in the final. Overall during the year Agassi won five titles including two majors and the ATP Masters Series in Paris, where he beat Marat Safin. Agassi ended 1999 as the No. 1, ending Sampras's record of six consecutive year-ending top rankings (1993–98). This was the only time Agassi ended the year at No. 1. Agassi was runner-up to Sampras at the year-end Tennis Masters Cup losing in straight sets despite beating Sampras in the round-robin.

In the semi finals of the 2000 Australian Open against Sampras, Agassi trailed 2 sets to 1 and a mini-break in the fourth set tie break at 4–3, but won the tie break and then took the fifth set 6–1 (Sampras served 37 aces against him). He then beat Yevgeny Kafelnikov in a four-set final to take his second Australian Open title. He was the first male player to have reached four consecutive Grand Slam finals since Rod Laver achieved the Grand Slam in 1969. (Note: Roger Federer has since surpassed this feat, reaching ten consecutive Grand Slam finals from 2005 to 2007.) Agassi reached the semi-finals at Wimbledon, where he lost in five sets to Rafter in a match considered by many to be one of the best ever at Wimbledon. At the Tennis Masters Cup in Lisbon, Agassi reached the final after defeating world No. 1 Marat Safin in the semi-finals to end the Russian's hopes of becoming the youngest year-end No. 1 in the history of tennis. Agassi then lost to Gustavo Kuerten in the final, allowing Kuerten to be crowned year-end No. 1. Agassi finished the year ranked 6.

=== 2001–2003: Final major titles ===
Agassi opened 2001 by successfully defending his Australian Open title with a straight-sets final win over Arnaud Clément. En route, he beat a cramping Rafter in five sets in front of a sell-out crowd in what turned out to be the Aussie's last Australian Open. At the French Open, Agassi lost in four sets in the quarter finals to Sébastien Grosjean. At Wimbledon, Agassi and Rafter met again in the semi-finals, where Agassi lost 8–6 in the fifth set. In the quarterfinals at the US Open, Agassi lost a 3-hour, 33 minute epic match with Sampras, 7–6, 6–7, 6–7, 6–7, with no breaks of serve during the 52-game match. Despite the setback, Agassi finished 2001 ranked No. 3, becoming the only male tennis player to finish a year ranked in the top 3 in three different decades.

Injury forced Agassi to skip the 2002 Australian Open, where he was a two-time defending champion. He defended his Key Biscayne title beating Roger Federer in a four-set final. At the French Open, Agassi lost in four sets in the quarter finals to Juan Carlos Ferrero, making 87 unforced errors. At the US Open, Agassi overcame No.1 ranked and defending champion Lleyton Hewitt in the semi-finals. This led to what turned out to be the last duel between Agassi and Sampras in final of the US Open, which Sampras won in four sets and left Sampras with a 20–14 edge in their 34 career meetings. The match was the last of Sampras's career. Agassi's US Open finish, along with his Masters Series victories in Key Biscayne, Rome and Madrid, helped him finish 2002 as the oldest year-end No. 2 at 32 years and 8 months.

In 2003, Agassi won the eighth (and final) Grand Slam title of his career at the Australian Open, where he beat Rainer Schüttler in straight sets in the final. At the French Open, he lost in the quarterfinals to Guillermo Coria in four sets. "A step slower than his opponent ... the 33-year-old Agassi was made to look his age."

On April 28, 2003, he recaptured the No. 1 ranking to become the oldest top-ranked male player since the ATP rankings began at 33 years and 13 days. The record was later surpassed by Roger Federer in 2018. He had held the No. 1 ranking for two weeks, when Lleyton Hewitt took it back on May 12, 2003. Agassi then recaptured the No. 1 ranking once again on June 16, 2003, which he held for 12 weeks until September 7, 2003. There he managed to reach the US Open semi-finals, where he lost to Juan Carlos Ferrero, surrendering his No. 1 ranking to him. During his career, Agassi held the ranking for a total of 101 weeks. Agassi's ranking slipped when injuries forced him to withdraw from a number of events. At the year-end Tennis Masters Cup, Agassi lost in the final to Federer, his third time to finish as runner-up in the event after losses in 1999 and 2000, and finished the year ranked No. 4. At age 33, he had been one of the oldest players to rank in the top 5 since Connors, at age 35, was No. 4 in 1987.

=== 2004–2006: Final competitive years ===
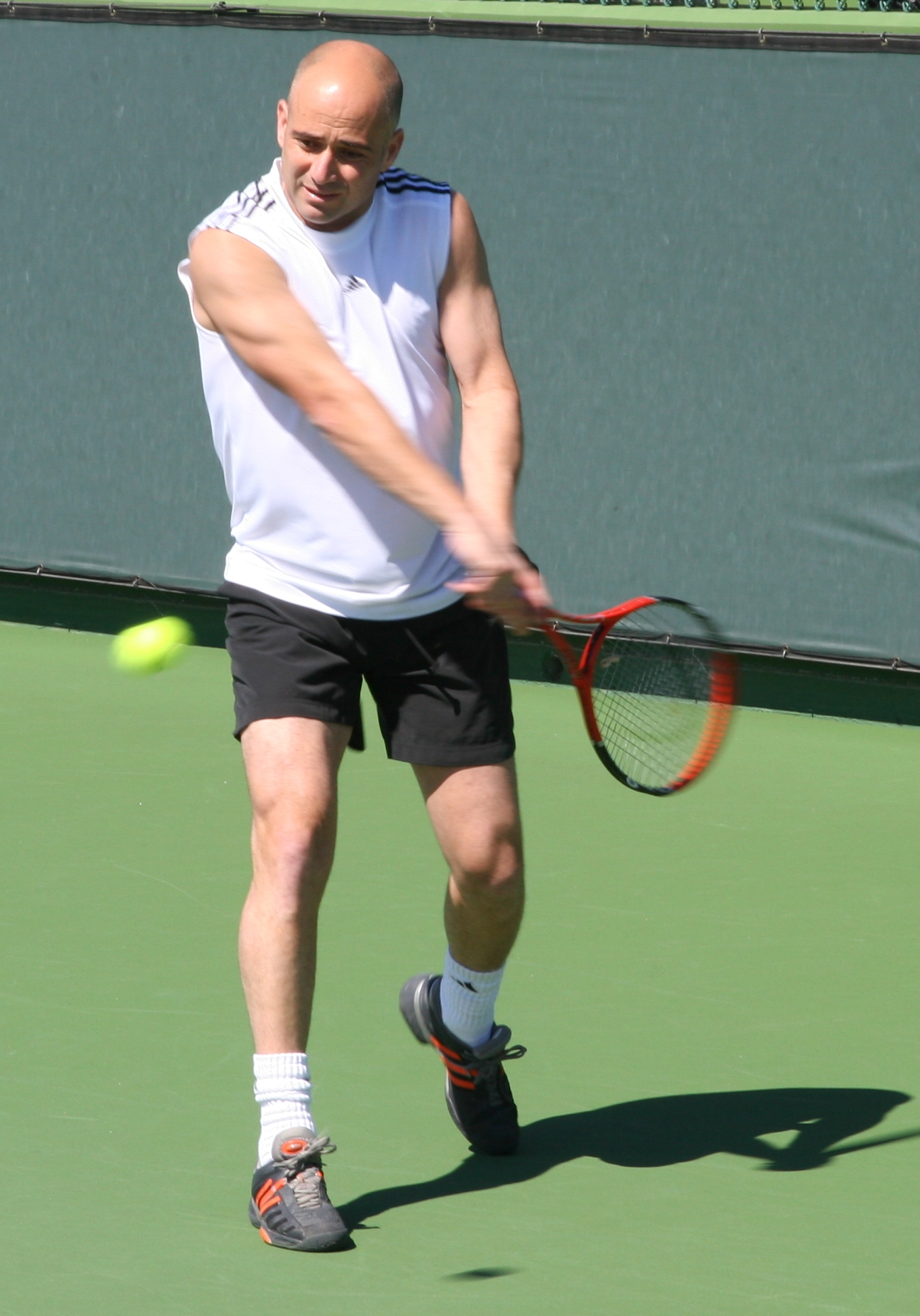
Agassi in 2006

In 2004, Agassi began the year with a five-set loss in the semi-finals of the Australian Open to Marat Safin; the loss ended Agassi's 26-match winning streak at the event. He won the Masters series event in Cincinnati (a then record 17th ATP Masters Series title, having won seven of the nine ATP Masters events). At 34, he became the second-oldest singles champion in Cincinnati tournament history (the tournament began in 1899), tied with Roger Federer and surpassed by Ken Rosewall. At the US Open Agassi lost to Federer in the quarter finals in five sets played in exceptionally windy conditions. "It was very difficult. It was one of the worst conditions I've played in. It's like playing warmup tennis and trying to keep the ball in play" said Federer afterwards. He finished the year ranked No. 8, one of the oldest players to finish in the top 10 since the 36-year-old Connors was No. 7 in 1988. Agassi also became the sixth male player during the open era to reach 800 career wins with his first-round victory over Alex Bogomolov in Los Angeles.

Agassi's 2005 began with a quarterfinal loss to Federer at the Australian Open. He had several other deep runs at tournaments, but had to withdraw from several events due to injury. He lost to Jarkko Nieminen in the first round of the French Open. He won his fourth title in Los Angeles (his 60th and last top-level singles title) and reached the final of the Rogers Cup, before losing to No. 2 Rafael Nadal. At the US Open, Agassi won three consecutive five-set matches to advance to the final. The most notable of these matches was his quarterfinal victory over James Blake, where he rallied from two sets down to win in the fifth set tie-breaker. His other five-set victories were over Xavier Malisse in the fourth round and Robby Ginepri in the semi-finals. In the final, Federer defeated Agassi in four sets. Agassi finished 2005 ranked No. 7, his 16th time in the year-end top-10 rankings, which tied Connors for the most times ranked in the ATP top 10 at year's end.

Agassi suffered from injuries (primarily to his back) in the early part of 2006, causing his withdrawal from many events. This caused his ranking to drop out of the top 10 for the last time. Agassi returned for the grass-court season. At Wimbledon he was defeated in the third round by world No. 2 (and eventual runner-up) Rafael Nadal. At Wimbledon, Agassi announced his plans to retire following the US Open. Agassi played only two events during the summer hard-court season with his best result being a quarterfinal loss in Los Angeles to Fernando González of Chile, which resulted in him being unseeded at the US Open.

Agassi had a short, but dramatic, run in his final US Open. Because of extreme back pain, Agassi was forced to receive anti-inflammatory injections after every match. After a four-set win against Andrei Pavel, Agassi faced eighth-seeded Marcos Baghdatis (the 2006 Australian Open finalist) in the second round. Agassi won in five sets as the younger Baghdatis succumbed to muscle cramping in the final set. In his last match, Agassi fell to 112th-ranked Benjamin Becker of Germany in four sets. Agassi received a four-minute standing ovation from the crowd after the match and delivered a retirement speech.

== Rivalries ==
=== Agassi vs. Sampras ===
They had a contrasting playing style, with Sampras and Agassi being considered respectively the greatest server and the greatest serve returner of their eras. Sampras won 20 of the 34 matches he played against Agassi.

The 1990 US Open was their first meeting in a Grand Slam tournament final. Agassi lost the final to Sampras in straight sets. Their next Grand Slam meeting was at the 1992 French Open, where they met in the quarterfinals. Agassi prevailed in straight sets. Their next Grand Slam meeting was at the quarterfinals of Wimbledon in 1993, where Agassi was the defending champion and Sampras was the newly minted No. 1. Sampras prevailed in five sets.

Notable Sampras–Agassi matches of 1995 included the finals of the Australian Open, the Newsweek Champions Cup, the Lipton International Players Championships, the Canadian Open, and the US Open, with Sampras winning the Newsweek Champions Cup and the US Open.

The next time Sampras and Agassi met in a Grand Slam final was at Wimbledon in 1999, where Sampras won in straight sets. They faced each other twice in the season-ending ATP Tour World Championships, with Sampras losing the round-robin match, but winning the final.

They played each other only once in 2000. The top-ranked Agassi defeated No. 3 Sampras in the semifinals of the Australian Open in five sets. In the 2001 season, Agassi won the Indian Wells Masters by defeating Sampras in the final. Later that year, Sampras defeated Agassi in the 2001 US Open quarterfinals 6–7, 7–6, 7–6, 7–6, where there were no breaks of serve during the entire match.

The final of the 2002 US Open was their first meeting in a US Open final since 1995. Sampras defeated Agassi in four sets. This was the final ATP tour singles match of Sampras's career.

In 2009, in Macau Agassi and Sampras met for the first time on court since the 2002 US Open final. Sampras won the exhibition in three sets. In August 2010, Sampras played an exhibition game with Agassi at the indoor arena Coliseo Cubierto El Campin in Bogotá, Colombia.

=== Agassi vs. Chang ===
Michael Chang was the opponent Agassi faced most frequently from all the players other than Sampras. They met 22 times on the tour level with Agassi leading 15–7. Chang, unlike most of Agassi's big rivals also preferred to stay at the baseline, with Agassi preferring to dictate points and Chang being more defensive-minded. The outcome was that most of their meetings were built on long and entertaining rallies. The rivalry began late in the 1980s with both players being considered the prodigies of the next great generation of American tennis players and both being of foreign descent.

Agassi won the first four matches including a straight-set victory in round 16 of the 1988 US Open and defeating Chang, the defending champion, in the 1990 French Open in a four-set quarterfinal. Arguably their best match took place in the round of 16 of the 1994 US Open. While both players presented high-quality shot-making, the momentum changed from set to set with Agassi eventually prevailing in a five-set victory. It turned out to be the toughest contest on his way to his first US Open title. Their next two Grand Slam meetings came in 1996, with Chang recording easy straight-set victories in the semi-finals of both the Australian Open and the US Open. Years after, Agassi shockingly admitted in his book that he had lost the first of the matches on purpose as he did not want to face Boris Becker, who was awaiting the winner in the final. Agassi won the last four of their matches, with the last being in 2003 at the Miami Open with Chang being clearly past his prime.

=== Agassi vs. Becker ===
Boris Becker and Agassi played 14 times with Agassi leading 10–4. Becker won their first three matches in 1988 and 1989 before Agassi reversed the rivalry in 1990, winning 10 of their last 11 matches. One contributing factor is that after their third match, Agassi picked up a tell regarding Becker's serve and knew where his serves would be directed. They first played at Indian Wells in 1988, with Becker prevailing. Their most notable match was the 1989 Davis Cup semi-final match, which Becker won in five sets after losing the first two in tiebreaks. Agassi, considered a baseliner with a playing style not suiting grass, shocked Becker, a three-time champion, in a five-set quarterfinal at Wimbledon in 1992 on his way to his first Grand Slam title. The intensity of the rivalry peaked in 1995. Becker won that year's Wimbledon semi-final after being down a set and two breaks, to eventually win in four sets. In a highly anticipated rematch in the US Open semi-final, this time it was Agassi who came out victorious in four tight sets. Their final match was played at Hong Kong in 1999, which Agassi won in three sets.

=== Agassi vs. Rafter ===
Agassi and Pat Rafter played fifteen times with Agassi leading 10–5. The rivalry delivered memorable encounters, because of the players' contrasting styles of play, with Rafter using traditional serve-&-volley methods against Agassi's variety of return of serves and passing shots as his main weapons. Agassi led 8–2 on hard courts, but Rafter surprisingly won their sole match on clay at the 1999 Rome Masters. They played four matches at Wimbledon, including three consecutive semi-finals from 1999 to 2001, Agassi winning in 1993 and 1999, while Rafter took their 2000 and 2001 encounters, the latter two matches being grueling 5-setters often being presented on the lists of best matches ever played. Agassi also won both their meetings at the Australian Open, in 1995 and 2001 (the latter semi-final that went to 5 sets), on his way to the title on both occasions. Rafter, however, took their only US Open encounter in 1997, where Agassi was unseeded, and went on to win the title.

=== Agassi vs. Federer ===
Agassi and Roger Federer played eleven times, and Federer led their head-to-head series 8–3. They first faced each other at the Swiss Indoors in 1998. Agassi won their first 3 matches, but Federer reversed the rivalry in 2003, winning all 8 of their remaining matches. Their last encounter was in the 2005 U.S. Open Finals.

=== Agassi vs. Edberg ===
Agassi and Stefan Edberg played nine times, and Agassi led their head-to-head series 6–3.

== Post-retirement: Exhibition appearances ==
Since retiring, Agassi has participated in a series of charity tournaments and continues his work with his own charity. In September 2007, he was a guest commentator for the Andy Roddick/Roger Federer US Open quarterfinal. He played an exhibition match at Wimbledon, teaming with his wife, Steffi Graf, against Tim Henman and Kim Clijsters. He played World Team Tennis for the Philadelphia Freedoms in the summer of 2009. At the 2009 French Open, Agassi presented Roger Federer with the trophy.

Also in 2009, Agassi played an Outback Champions Series event for the first time. He played the Cancer Treatment Centers of America Tennis Championships at Surprise, Arizona, where he lost the final to Todd Martin. Agassi returned to the tour renamed the PowerShares Series in 2011 and participated in a total of seven events while winning two. Agassi beat Courier in the final of the Staples Champions Cup in Boston and later defeated Sampras at the CTCA Championships at his hometown Las Vegas.

In 2012, Agassi took part in five tournaments, winning three. In November, he won BILT Champions Showdown in San Jose, beating John McEnroe in the final. The following day, he defended his title of the CTCA Championships, while defeating Courier in the decisive match. In the series season finale, he beat Michael Chang for the Acura Champions Cup. In 2014 Agassi won both tournaments he participated in. At the Camden Wealth Advisors Cup's final in Houston, Agassi beat James Blake. He defeated Blake again in Portland to win the title of the Cancer Treatment Centers of America Championships. In 2015, Agassi took part in one event of the PowerShares Series, losing to Mark Philippoussis in the final of the Champions Shootout. The following year he took part in two events, losing to Blake in Chicago, and the next day defeating Mardy Fish, but losing to Roddick in Charleston.

In 2009, in Macau Agassi and Sampras met for the first time on court since the 2002 US Open final. Sampras won the exhibition in three sets. The rivalry between the former champions headlined sports media again in March 2010 after the two participated in the "Hit for Haiti" charity event organized to raise money for the victims of the earthquake. Partnered with Roger Federer and Rafael Nadal, the old rivals began making remarks at each other's expense, which ended up with Sampras intentionally striking a serve at Agassi's body. After the event, Agassi admitted that he had crossed the line with his jokes and publicly apologized to Sampras. Agassi and Sampras met again one year later for an exhibition match at Madison Square Garden in New York in front of 19 000 spectators as Sampras defeated Agassi in two sets. On March 3, 2014, Agassi and Sampras squared off for an exhibition in London for the annual World Tennis Day. This time, it was Agassi who came out on top in two straight sets.

He returned to the tour in May 2017 in the position of coach to Novak Djokovic for the French Open. Agassi announced the end of the partnership on March 31, 2018, stating that there were too many disagreements in the relationship.

== Legacy ==
Considered by numerous sources to be one of the greatest tennis players of all time, Agassi has also been called one of the greatest service returners ever to play the game, and was described by the BBC upon his retirement as "perhaps the biggest worldwide star in the sport's history". As a result, he is credited for helping to revive the popularity of tennis during the 1990s.

Among his numerous career accolades, Agassi was named the BBC Overseas Sports Personality of the Year in 1992, and the 7th greatest male player of all time by Sports Illustrated in 2010. On July 9, 2011, Agassi was inducted into the International Tennis Hall of Fame at a ceremony in Newport, Rhode Island.

Agassi earned more than $30 million in prize-money during his career, second only to Sampras at the time of his retirement. He also earned more than $25 million a year through endorsements during his career, which was ranked fourth in all sports at the time.

== Playing style ==
Early in his career, Agassi would look to end points quickly by playing first-strike tennis, typically by inducing a weak return with a deep, hard shot, and then playing a winner at an extreme angle. On the rare occasion that he charged the net, Agassi liked to take the ball in the air and hit a swinging volley for a winner. His favored groundstroke was his flat, accurate two-handed backhand, hit well cross-court but especially down the line. His forehand was nearly as strong, especially his inside-out to the ad court.

Agassi's strength was in dictating play from the baseline, and he was able to consistently take the ball on the rise. While he was growing up, his father and Nick Bollettieri trained him in this way. When in control of a point, Agassi would often pass up an opportunity to attempt a winner and hit a conservative shot to minimize his errors, and to make his opponent run more. This change to more methodical, less aggressive baseline play was largely initiated by his longtime coach, Brad Gilbert, in their first year together in 1994. Gilbert encouraged Agassi to wear out opponents with his deep, flat groundstrokes and to use his fitness to win attrition wars, and noted Agassi's two-handed backhand down the line as his very best shot. A signature play later in his career was a change-up drop shot to the deuce court after deep penetrating groundstrokes. This would often be followed by a passing shot or lob if the opponent was fast enough to retrieve it.

Agassi was raised on hardcourts, but found much of his early major-tournament success on the red clay of Roland Garros, reaching two consecutive finals there early in his career. Despite grass being his worst surface, his first major win was at the slick grass of Wimbledon in 1992, a tournament that he professed to hating at the time. His strongest surface over the course of his career, was indeed hardcourt, where he won six of his eight majors.

== Business ventures ==
Agassi established a limited liability company named Andre Agassi Ventures (formerly named Agassi Enterprises). Agassi, along with five athlete partners (including Wayne Gretzky, Joe Montana, Shaquille O'Neal, Ken Griffey Jr., and Monica Seles) opened a chain of sports-themed restaurant named Official All Star Café in April 1996. The restaurant closed down in 2001.

In 1999, he paid $1 million for a 10 percent stake in Nevada First Bank and made a $10 million profit when it was sold to Western Alliance Bancorp in 2006.

In 2002, he joined the Tennis Channel to promote the channel to consumers and cable and satellite industry, and made an equity investment in the network. After meeting chef Michael Mina at one of his restaurants in San Francisco, Agassi partnered with him in 2002 to start Mina Group Inc. and opened 18 concept restaurants in San Francisco, San Jose, Dana Point, Atlantic City and Las Vegas. Agassi was an equity investor of a group that acquired Golden Nugget Las Vegas and Golden Nugget Laughlin from MGM Mirage for $215 million in 2004. One year later, the group sold the hotel-casino to Landry's, Inc. for $163 million in cash and $182 million in assumed debt. In 2007, he sat on the board of Meadows Bank, an independent bank in Nevada. He has invested in start-up companies backed by Allen & Company.

Agassi and Graf formed a company called Agassi Graf Holdings. They invested in PURE, a nightclub at Caesars Palace, which opened in 2004, and sold it to Angel Management Group in 2010. In August 2006, Agassi and Graf developed a joint venture with high-end furniture maker Kreiss Enterprises. They launched a furniture line called Agassi Graf Collection. In September, Agassi and Graf, through their company Agassi Graf Development LLC, along with Bayview Financial LP, finalized an agreement to develop a condominium hotel, Fairmont Tamarack, at Tamarack Resort in Donnelly, Idaho. Owing to difficult market conditions and delays, they withdrew from the project in 2009. The group still owns three small chunks of land. In September, they collaborated with Steve Case's Exclusive Resorts to co-develop luxury resorts and design Agassi-Graf Tennis and Fitness Centers.

They also invested in online ticket reseller Viagogo in 2009 and both serve as board members and advisors of the company.

In October 2012, Village Roadshow and investors including Agassi and Graf announced plans to build a new water park called Wet'n'Wild Las Vegas in Las Vegas. Village Roadshow has a 51% stake in the park while Agassi, Graf, and other private investors hold the remaining 49%. The park opened in May 2013.

IMG managed Agassi from the time he turned pro in 1986 through January 2000 before switching to SFX Sports Group. His business manager, lawyer and agent was childhood friend Perry Rogers, but they have been estranged since 2008. In 2009, he and Graf signed with CAA.

=== Equipment and endorsements ===
Agassi used Prince Graphite rackets early in his career. He signed a $7 million endorsement contract with Belgian tennis racquet makers Donnay. He later switched to Head Ti Radical racket and Head's LiquidMetal Radical racket, having signed a multimillion-dollar endorsement deal with Head in 1993. He renewed his contract in 1999, and in November 2003 he signed a lifetime agreement with Head. He also endorses Penn tennis balls. On July 25, 2005, Agassi left Nike after 17 years and signed an endorsement deal with Adidas. A major reason for Agassi leaving Nike was because Nike refused to donate to Agassi's charities, and Adidas did. On May 13, 2013, Agassi rejoined Nike.

Agassi was sponsored by DuPont, Ebel, Mountain Dew in 1993, Mazda in 1997, Kia Motors in 2002, American Express and Deutsche Bank in 2003. In 1990, he appeared in a television commercial for Canon Inc., promoting the Canon EOS Rebel camera. Between 1999 and 2000, he signed a multimillion-dollar, multiyear endorsement deal with Schick and became the worldwide spokesman for the company. Agassi signed a multiyear contract with Twinlab and promoted the company's nutritional supplements. In mid-2003, he was named the spokesman of Aramis Life, a fragrance by Aramis, and signed a five-year deal with the company. In March 2004, he signed a ten-year agreement worth $1.5 million a year with 24 Hour Fitness, which will open five Andre Agassi fitness centers by year-end. Prior to the 2012 Australian Open, Agassi and Australian winemaker Jacobs Creek announced a three-year partnership and created the Open Film Series to "[share] personal stories about the life defining moments that shaped his character on and off the court." In 2007, watchmaker Longines named Agassi as their brand ambassador.

Agassi and his mother appeared in a Got Milk? advertisement in 2002.

Agassi has appeared in many advertisements and television commercials with Graf. They both endorsed Deutsche Telekom in 2002, Genworth Financial and Canon Inc. in 2004, LVMH in 2007, and Nintendo Wii and Wii Fit U and Longines in 2013.

In 2024, Agassi entered into a partnership agreement with pickleball and table tennis equipment company JOOLA involving the development of pickleball equipment, events, and other initiatives; the financial terms of the agreement were not publicly disclosed.

In 2026, he became the face of an advertisement campaign for Lidl's private label cookware brand Silvercrest as a 'passionate amateur chef'. His wife Steffi Graf had previously partnered with Lidl's sportswear brand.

== In popular culture ==
In 2017, Agassi appeared in the documentary film Love Means Zero, which highlighted the troubled relationship between his coach Nick Bollettieri and him.

=== Politics ===
Agassi has donated more than $100,000 to Democratic candidates, and $2,000 to Republicans. On September 1, 2010, when he appeared on daily WNYC public radio program The Brian Lehrer Show, he stated that he is registered as Independent.

=== Philanthropy ===
Agassi founded the Andre Agassi Charitable Association in 1994, which assists Las Vegas' young people. He was awarded the ATP Arthur Ashe Humanitarian award in 1995 for his efforts to help disadvantaged youth. He has been cited as the most charitable and socially involved player in professional tennis. It has also been claimed that he may be the most charitable athlete of his generation.

Agassi's charities help in assisting children reach their athletic potential. His Boys & Girls Club sees 2,000 children throughout the year and boasts a world-class junior tennis team. It also has a basketball program (the Agassi Stars) and a rigorous system that encourages a mix of academics and athletics.

In 2001, Agassi opened the Andre Agassi College Preparatory Academy in Las Vegas, a tuition-free charter school for at-risk children in the area. He personally donated $35 million to the school. In 2009, the graduating class had a 100 percent graduation rate and expected a 100 percent college acceptance rate. Among other child-related programs that Agassi supports through his Andre Agassi Charitable Foundation is Clark County's only residential facility for abused and neglected children, Child Haven. In 1997, Agassi donated funding to Child Haven for a six-room classroom building now named the Agassi Center for Education. His foundation also provided $720,000 to assist in the building of the Andre Agassi Cottage for Medically Fragile Children. This 20-bed facility opened in December 2001, and accommodates developmentally delayed or handicapped children and children quarantined for infectious diseases.

In 2007, along with several other athletes, Agassi founded the charity Athletes for Hope, which helps professional athletes get involved in charitable causes and aims to inspire all people to volunteer and support their communities. He created the Canyon-Agassi Charter School Facilities Fund, now known as the Turner-Agassi Charter School Facilities Fund. The Fund is an investment initiative for social change, focusing on the "nationwide effort to move charters from stopgap buildings into permanent campuses."

In September 2013, the Andre Agassi Foundation for Education formed a partnership with V20 Foods to launch Box Budd!es, a line of kids' healthy snacks. All proceeds go to the Foundation.

In February 2014, Agassi remodeled the vacant University of Phoenix building in Las Vegas as a new school, called the Doral Academy West through the Canyon-Agassi Charter School Facilities Fund. Doral Academy opened in August 2014. The Fund purchased a 4.6-acre plot in Henderson, Nevada, to house the Somerset Academy of Las Vegas, which will relocate from its campus inside a church.

== Pickleball ==
On April 2, 2023, Agassi participated with Michael Chang, Andy Roddick and John McEnroe in the first live airing of pickleball on ESPN in the Million dollar Pickleball Slam at the Hard Rock Casino in Hollywood, Florida.

Both he and wife Steffi Graf play pickleball and in April 2025, Agassi announced he would make his professional debut in the U.S. Open Pickleball Championships played April 26 – May 3, 2025 in Naples, Florida.

After receiving a 1st Round Bye in the Mixed Doubles Bracket, Agassi, playing alongside Women's World Number One Anna Leigh Waters, won his debut professional match vs teenagers Tristan Dussalt and Stevie Petropouleas 11–8, 9–11, 11–7. Agassi and Waters then fell 11–7, 4–11, 7–11 in the 3rd Round to Len Yang, and Trang Huynh-McClain.

== Relationships and family ==
In the early 1990s, after dating Wendi Stewart, Agassi dated American singer and entertainer Barbra Streisand. He wrote about the relationship in his 2009 autobiography, "We agree that we're good for each other, and so what if she's twenty-eight years older? We're sympatico, and the public outcry only adds spice to our connection. It makes our friendship feel forbidden, taboo — another piece of my overall rebellion. Dating Barbra Streisand is like wearing Hot Lava."

He was married to actress Brooke Shields from 1997 to 1999.

He married Steffi Graf on October 22, 2001, at their Las Vegas home; the only witnesses were their mothers. They have two children: son Jaden Gil (born 2001) and daughter Jaz Elle (born 2003). Agassi has said that he and Graf are not pushing their children toward becoming tennis players; Agassi's son Jaden took up baseball, playing for the University of Southern California and the German national team. The Graf-Agassi family resides in Summerlin, a community in the Las Vegas Valley. Graf's mother and brother, Michael, with his four children, also live there.

His mother is a breast cancer survivor.

Long-time trainer Gil Reyes has been called one of Agassi's closest friends; some have described him as being a "father figure" to Agassi. In 2012, Agassi and Reyes introduced their own line of fitness equipment, BILT By Agassi and Reyes. In December 2008, Agassi's childhood friend and former business manager, Perry Rogers, sued Graf for $50,000 in management fees he claimed that she owed him.

== Autobiography ==
Agassi's autobiography, Open: An Autobiography, (written with assistance from J. R. Moehringer), was published in November 2009. In it, Agassi talks about his childhood and his unconventional Armenian father, who came to the United States from Iran, where he was a professional boxer. Overly demanding and emotionally abusive to the whole family, his father groomed young Agassi for tennis greatness by building a tennis court in their backyard and sending Agassi to tennis boarding school under the supervision of Nick Bollettieri, who later coached and managed part of Agassi's professional career.

There is also mention in the book of using and testing positive for methamphetamine in 1997. In response to this revelation, Roger Federer declared himself shocked and disappointed, while Marat Safin argued that Agassi should return his prize money and be stripped of his titles. In an interview with CBS, Agassi justified himself and asked for understanding, saying that "It was a period in my life where I needed help."

Agassi said that he had always hated tennis during his career because of the constant pressure it exerted on him. He also said he wore a hairpiece earlier in his career and thought Pete Sampras was "robotic".

The book reached No. 1 on the New York Times Best Seller list and received favorable reviews. It won the Autobiography category of the 2010 British Sports Book Awards. In 2018, the book was listed on Esquire as one of "The 30 Best Sports Books Ever Written", and was also recommended by self-help author Tim Ferriss who described it as "very candid, very amusing, and very instructional".

== Career statistics ==
=== Singles performance timeline ===
Key
**W**	F	SF	QF	#R	RR	Q#	DNQ	A	NH

(W) winner; (F) finalist; (SF) semifinalist; (QF) quarterfinalist; (#R) rounds 4, 3, 2, 1; (RR) round-robin stage; (Q#) qualification round; (DNQ) did not qualify; (A) absent; (NH) not held; (SR) strike rate (events won / competed); (W–L) win–loss record.

Tournament	1986	1987	1988	1989	1990	1991	1992	1993	1994	1995	1996	1997	1998	1999	2000	2001	2002	2003	2004	2005	2006	SR	W–L	Win %
**Grand Slam tournaments**
Australian Open	NH	A	A	A	A	A	A	A	A	**W**	SF	A	4R	4R	**W**	**W**	A	**W**	SF	QF	A	4 / 9	48–5	90.6
French Open	A	2R	SF	3R	F	F	SF	A	2R	QF	2R	A	1R	**W**	2R	QF	QF	QF	1R	1R	A	1 / 17	51–16	76.1
Wimbledon	A	1R	A	A	A	QF	**W**	QF	4R	SF	1R	A	2R	F	SF	SF	2R	4R	A	A	3R	1 / 14	46–13	78.0
US Open	1R	1R	SF	SF	F	1R	QF	1R	**W**	F	SF	4R	4R	**W**	2R	QF	F	SF	QF	F	3R	2 / 21	79–19	80.6
**W–L**	0–1	1–3	10–2	7–2	12–2	10–3	16–2	4–2	11–2	22–3	11–4	3–1	7–4	23–2	14–3	20–3	11–3	19–3	9–3	10–3	4–2	**8 / 61**	**224–53**	**80.9**
**Year-end championships**
Masters Cup	DNQ	DNQ	RR	RR	**W**	SF	DNQ	DNQ	SF	A	RR	DNQ	RR	F	F	RR	RR	F	A	RR	RET	1 / 13	22–20	52.4
**Year-end ranking**	91	25	3	7	4	10	9	24	2	2	8	110	6	**1**	6	3	2	4	8	7	150	**$31,152,975**		

=== Grand Slam finals 15 (8 titles, 7 runners-up) ===
By winning the 1999 French Open, Agassi completed a men's singles Career Grand Slam. He is the 5th of 9 male players in history (after Budge, Perry, Laver and Emerson, and before Federer, Nadal, Djokovic, and Alcaraz) to achieve this.

Result	Year	Championship	Surface	Opponent	Score
Loss	1990	French Open	Clay	(Ecuador) Andrés Gómez	3–6, 6–2, 4–6, 4–6
Loss	1990	US Open	Hard	(United States) Pete Sampras	4–6, 3–6, 2–6
Loss	1991	French Open	Clay	(United States) Jim Courier	6–3, 4–6, 6–2, 1–6, 4–6
Win	1992	Wimbledon	Grass	(Croatia) Goran Ivanišević	6–7^{(8–10)}, 6–4, 6–4, 1–6, 6–4
Win	1994	US Open	Hard	(Germany) Michael Stich	6–1, 7–6^{(7–5)}, 7–5
Win	1995	Australian Open	Hard	(United States) Pete Sampras	4–6, 6–1, 7–6^{(8–6)}, 6–4
Loss	1995	US Open	Hard	(United States) Pete Sampras	4–6, 3–6, 6–4, 5–7
Win	1999	French Open	Clay	(Ukraine) Andrei Medvedev	1–6, 2–6, 6–4, 6–3, 6–4
Loss	1999	Wimbledon	Grass	(United States) Pete Sampras	3–6, 4–6, 5–7
Win	1999	US Open	Hard	(United States) Todd Martin	6–4, 6–7^{(5–7)}, 6–7^{(2–7)}, 6–3, 6–2
Win	2000	Australian Open	Hard	(Russia) Yevgeny Kafelnikov	3–6, 6–3, 6–2, 6–4
Win	2001	Australian Open	Hard	(France) Arnaud Clément	6–4, 6–2, 6–2
Loss	2002	US Open	Hard	(United States) Pete Sampras	3–6, 4–6, 7–5, 4–6
Win	2003	Australian Open	Hard	(Germany) Rainer Schüttler	6–2, 6–2, 6–1
Loss	2005	US Open	Hard	(Switzerland) Roger Federer	3–6, 6–2, 6–7^{(1–7)}, 1–6

==== Open Era records ====
- These records were attained in the Open Era of tennis and in ATP World Tour Masters 1000 series since 1990.
- Records in **bold** indicate peer-less achievements.

Time span	Selected Grand Slam tournament records	Players matched
1990 YEC (Note: Abbreviation for "Year-end championship".) – 1999 French Open	Career Super Slam (Note: A "Career Super Slam" entails winning all four majors, the Year-End Championship and the Olympic gold medal in singles.)	Novak Djokovic
1992 Wimbledon – 1999 French Open	Career Golden Slam	Rafael Nadal; Novak Djokovic
1992 Wimbledon – 1999 French Open	Career Grand Slam	Rod Laver; Roger Federer; Rafael Nadal; Novak Djokovic; Carlos Alcaraz
1990 Tour Finals – 1999 French Open	Career Grand Slam + ATP Tour Finals	Roger Federer; Novak Djokovic; Carlos Alcaraz
1999 French Open	Won a Grand Slam final from two sets down.	Björn Borg; Ivan Lendl; Gastón Gaudio; Dominic Thiem; Novak Djokovic; Rafael Nadal; Jannik Sinner; Carlos Alcaraz

Grand Slam tournaments	Time span	Records at each Grand Slam tournament	Players matched
Australian Open	1995	Won tournament on the first attempt	Jimmy Connors; Roscoe Tanner; Vitas Gerulaitis; Johan Kriek
Australian Open	2003	71.6% (121–48) games winning percentage in 1 tournament	**Stands alone**
US Open	1986–2006	21 consecutive tournaments played	**Stands alone**

Time span	Other selected records	Players matched
1990–2003	6 Miami Masters titles	Novak Djokovic
2001–2003	3 consecutive Miami Masters titles	Novak Djokovic
1990–2003	8 Miami Masters finals	Novak Djokovic
1988–2005	61 match wins at Miami Masters	**Stands alone**
2001–2004	19 consecutive wins at Miami Masters	**Stands alone**
1990–1999	5 Washington Open titles	**Stands alone**
1993–2002	4 Los Angeles Open titles	Jimmy Connors; Roy Emerson; Frank Parker

== Professional awards ==
- ITF World Champion: 1999.
- ATP Player of the Year: 1999.
- ATP Most Improved Player: 1988, 1998

== Video ==
- Wimbledon 2000 Semi-final – Agassi vs. Rafter (2003) Starring: Andre Agassi, Patrick Rafter; Standing Room Only, DVD Release Date: August 16, 2005, Run Time: 213 minutes, OCLC 61774054.
- Charlie Rose with Andre Agassi (May 7, 2001) Charlie Rose, Inc., DVD Release Date: August 15, 2006, Run Time: 57 minutes.
- Wimbledon: The Record Breakers (2005) Starring: Andre Agassi, Boris Becker; Standing Room Only, DVD Release Date: August 16, 2005, Run Time: 52 minutes, OCLC 61658553.

== Video games ==
- Andre Agassi Tennis for Super Nintendo Entertainment System, Genesis, Game Gear, Master System, and mobile phones
- Agassi Tennis Generation for PlayStation 2, Game Boy Advance, and Windows
- Agassi Tennis Generation 2002 for Windows
- Smash Court Pro Tournament for PlayStation 2
- Top Spin 4 for Xbox 360, PlayStation 3, and Wii
- Tennis World Tour for Xbox One, PlayStation 4, Nintendo Switch, and Windows
- Top Spin 2K25 for PlayStation 4, PlayStation 5, Xbox One, Xbox Series X, and Windows

== See also ==
- All-time tennis records – men's singles
- List of Grand Slam men's singles champions
- Tennis male players statistics
- Tennis records of the Open Era – men's singles

== Sources ==
- Agassi, Andre (2010). Open: An Autobiography. London: Vintage. ISBN 978-0-307-38840-7.
- Agassi, Mike; Cobello, Dominic; Welsh, Kate (2004). The Agassi Story. Toronto: ECW Press. ISBN 978-1-55022-656-0.

Sporting positions
Preceded by Pete Sampras; Pete Sampras; Pete Sampras; Pete Sampras; Lleyton Hewitt; Lleyton Hewitt	World No. 1 April 10, 1995 – November 5, 1995; January 29, 1996 – February 11, 1996; July 5, 1999 – July 25, 1999; September 13, 1999 – September 10, 2000; April 28, 2003 – May 11, 2003; June 16, 2003 – September 7, 2003	Succeeded by Pete Sampras; Thomas Muster; Patrick Rafter; Pete Sampras; Lleyton Hewitt; Juan Carlos Ferrero
Awards and achievements
Preceded by Mike Powell	BBC Overseas Sports Personality of the Year; 1992	Succeeded by Greg Norman
Preceded by Paul McNamee; Richard Krajicek	ATP Arthur Ashe Humanitarian of the Year; 1995; 2001	Succeeded by Paul Flory; Amir Hadad & Aisam-ul-Haq Qureshi
Preceded by Pete Sampras	ITF World Champion; 1999	Succeeded by Gustavo Kuerten
Preceded by Pete Sampras	ATP Player of the Year; 1999	Succeeded by Gustavo Kuerten
Preceded by Zinedine Zidane	L'Équipe Champion of Champions; 1999	Succeeded by Tiger Woods
Preceded by Peter Lundgren; Patrick Rafter	ATP Most Improved Player; 1988; 1998	Succeeded by Michael Chang; Nicolás Lapentti
Preceded by Pete Sampras	ESPY Best Male Tennis Player; 2000	Succeeded by Pete Sampras
Preceded by Lleyton Hewitt	ESPY Best Male Tennis Player; 2003	Succeeded by Andy Roddick
