= Love Means Zero =

- Directed by: Jason Kohn
- Produced by: Amanda Branson Gill; Jason Kohn; Jill Mazursky; Anne White; David Styne
- Starring: Nick Bollettieri; Andre Agassi
- Cinematography: Eduardo Enrique Mayén
- Edited by: Michael X. Flores; Jack Price
- Music by: Jonathan Sadoff
- Production company: Kilo Films
- Distributed by: Showtime Documentary Films
- Release dates: September 9, 2017 (TIFF); June 23, 2018 (Television)
- Running time: 89 minutes
- Country: United States
- Language: English

Love Means Zero is a 2017 American documentary film directed by Jason Kohn about tennis coach Nick Bollettieri and his troubled relationship with Andre Agassi.

The film had its world premiere at the 42nd Toronto International Film Festival on September 9, 2017. It was released on television by Showtime on June 23, 2018.

== Synopsis ==
Nick Bollettieri coached a generation of tennis champions, but his relentless desire to win cost him the relationship he valued most.

== Cast ==
- Nick Bollettieri
- Andre Agassi
- Carling Bassett-Seguso
- John F. Bassett
- Boris Becker
- Martin Blackman
- Bud Collins
- Jim Courier
- Barbara Becker
- Andrés Gómez
- Kathleen Horvath
- Goran Ivanišević
- Julio Moros
- Fritz Nau
- Jane Pauley
- Pete Sampras
- Brooke Shields

== Awards and nominations ==
Year	Festival	Category	Nominee	Result
2017	13th Camden International Film Festival	Harrell Award – Best Documentary Feature	Jason Kohn	Nominated
2017	25th Hamptons International Film Festival	Golden Starfish Award – Documentary Feature	Jason Kohn	Nominated
2017	26th Philadelphia Film Festival	Jury Award – Best Documentary Feature	Jason Kohn	Nominated
2018	35th Miami International Film Festival	Knight Documentary Achievement Award – Best Documentary	Jason Kohn	Nominated
2018	42nd Cleveland International Film Festival	Nesnady and Schwartz Documentary Competition – Best Documentary	Jason Kohn	Won
2018	7th Annapolis Film Festival	Documentary Competition – Best Documentary	Jason Kohn	Won
