= Pat Rowley =

Australian dairy industry figure (born 1935)

Patrick Desmond Rowley CMG
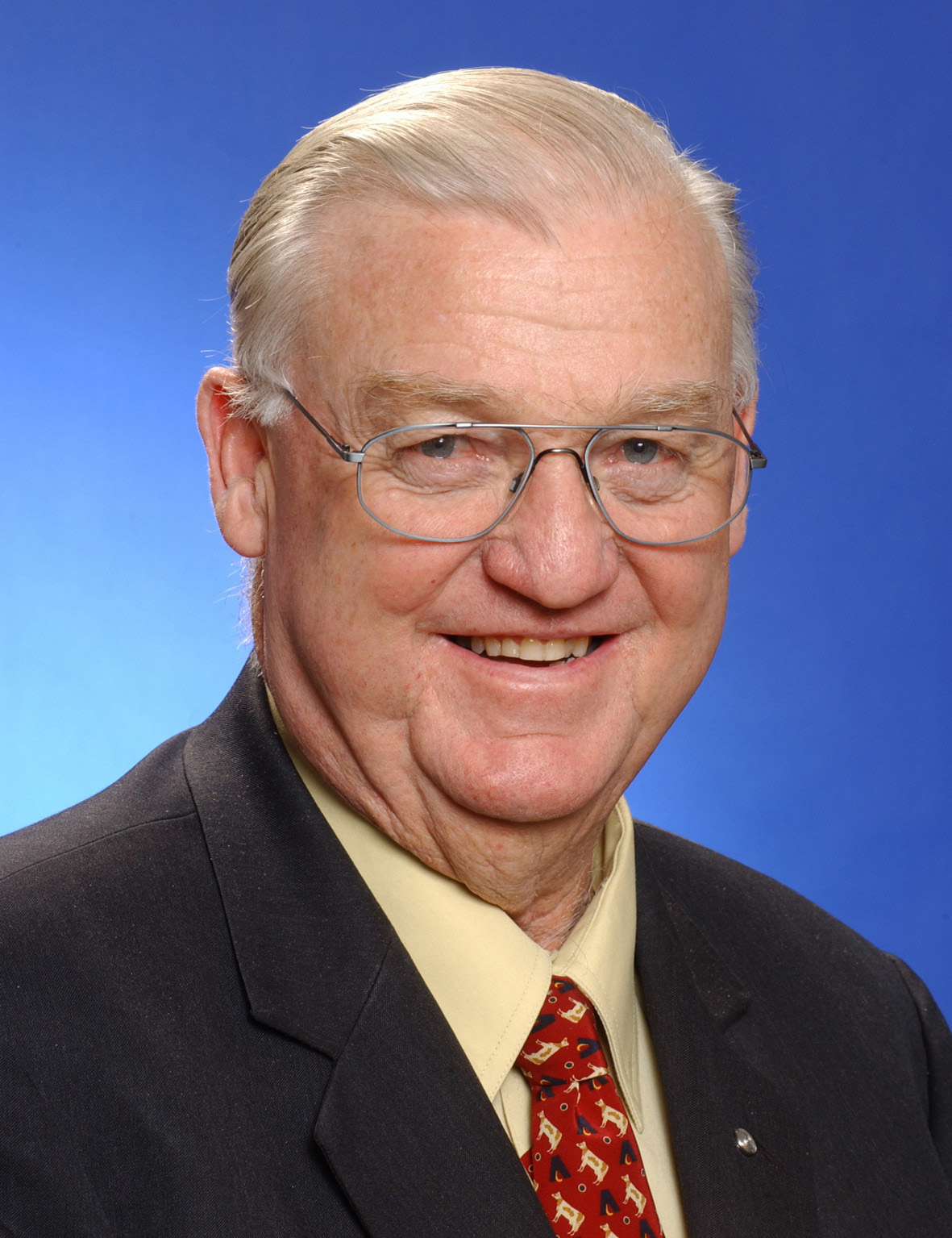
- Born: September 23, 1935 (age 90); Melbourne, Victoria, Australia
- Spouse: Mary Rowley (m. 1959, died 2021)

Patrick Desmond Rowley CMG (born 23 September 1935) is an Australian agricultural leader. He was chairman of the Australian Dairy Farmers Federation from 1977 until 2006, during which time he assisted in initiating significant industry changes. The Australian Broadcasting Corporation described him in 2003 as "the most influential figure in the history of Australian dairy farming".

== Personal life ==
=== Early life ===
Rowley was born to Charles "Charlie" Rowley and Lilian Henn [née] on 23 September 1935, in Melbourne, Victoria. He is the eldest of four siblings. The family moved to Queensland, and established their dairy farm in Burpengary, north of Brisbane, where Rowley Road is today. Pat Rowley attended Marist College, Ashgrove, a Catholic boarding school for boys, from grades 5–12.

=== Marriage and children ===
Rowley married Mary Monica Rospigaroff [née] on September 12, 1959, at St Peter's Catholic Church in Caboolture, Queensland, after meeting at a Junior Farmers gathering in Caboolture. After marrying, the couple moved to Dayboro, north-northwest of Brisbane They have five children together and as of 2020, have a total of eleven grandchildren. Mary died at their farm on 16 July 2021, after having received a terminal cancer diagnosis of glioblastoma exactly one month prior.

=== Religious views ===
Rowley, along with his wife, identifies as Catholics, a denomination of Christianity.

== Career ==
=== Positions held ===
| Organisation | Abbreviation | Position | Start | End |
|---|---|---|---|---|
| Australian Dairy Farmers Association | ADFA | President | 1985 | 2003 |
| Australian Dairy Farmers Federation | ADFF | Chairman | 1985 | 2003 |
| Australian Dairy Herd Improvement Scheme | ADHIS | Chairman | 1985 | 2003 |
| Australian Dairy Industry Council | ADIC | Chairman | 1985 | 2003 |
| Dairy Australia | N/A | Chairman | 2003 | 2006 |
| Premium Milk Supply Pty Ltd | N/A | Chairman | 1998 | 2007 |
| Queensland Dairyfarmers' Organisation | QDO | President | 1977 | 2003 |

=== The deregulation of the Australian dairy industry - 2000 ===
In 1984, in an effort to make the export of milk more competitive, the federal government undertook a Public Benefit test to examine the benefits of the current regulation levies in place across all Australian states. After most states failed to prove public benefit, the State Dairy Authorities concluded the results proved ending regulation would ultimately benefit the dairy industry. Because the current legislation prevented the interstate sales of milk and other dairy based products, the government determined that deregulation would relieve significant pressure on the commercial sales of milk in Victoria, in which the largest production of dairyfarming, and manufacture of milk, occurred.

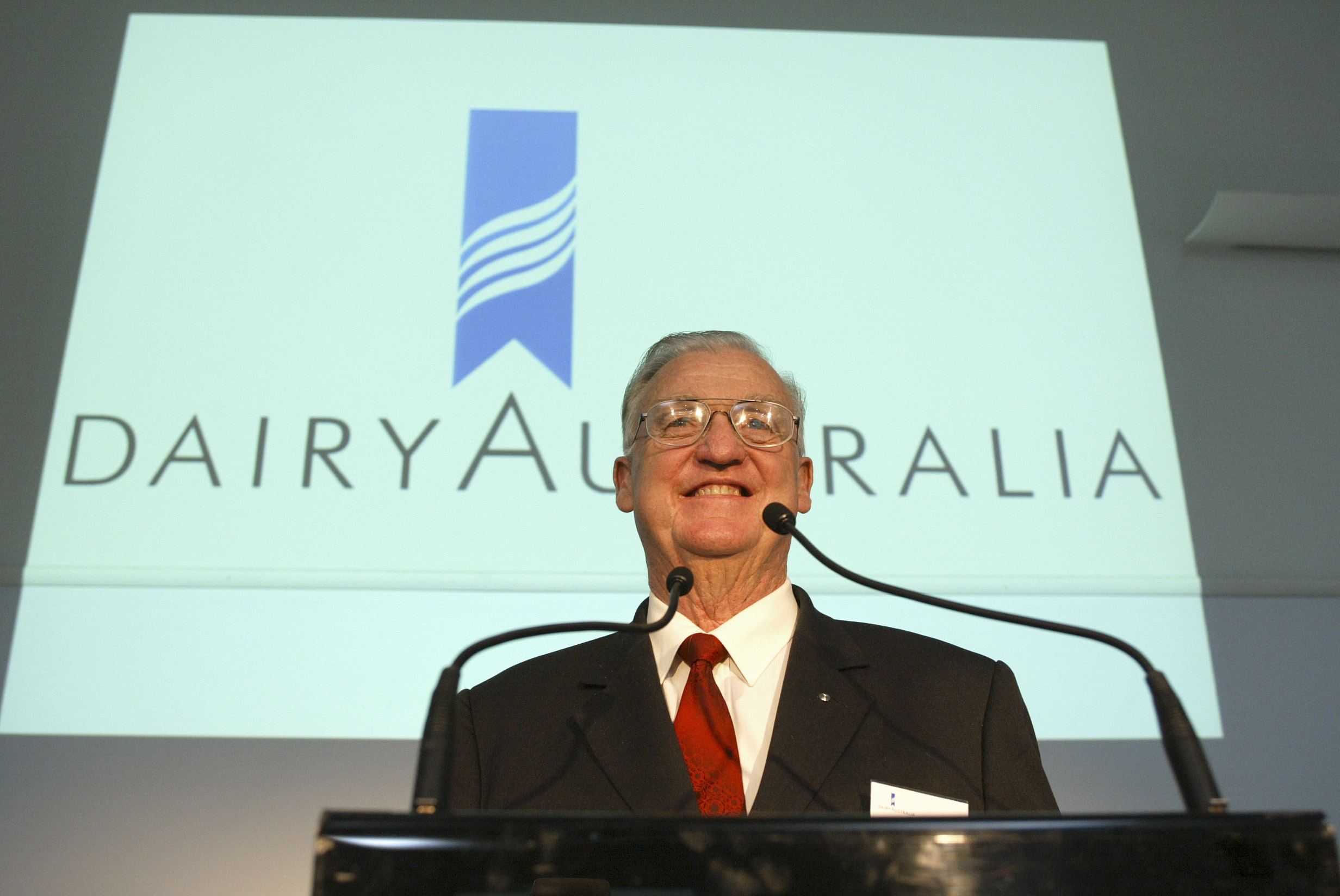

In 1999, the federal government announced plans to implement the Dairy Structural Adjustment Program (DSAP), a scheme that would be introduced nationwide to deregulate the dairy industry. This involved the removal of state and federal legislation surrounding the manufacture, sourcing and pricing of milk as a commodity. Deregulation would ensure a far more competitive dairy industry while simultaneously benefiting consumers by lowering retail prices of milk. Prior to deregulation, the Domestic Market Support scheme, a federal initiative, ensured that dairy farmers across Australia received efficient financial compensation for their contributions to the commercial dairy industry.

Recognising the inevitable and the chaos that would follow, the Australian Dairy Industry Council, chaired by Rowley, approached the government in partnership with Federal Minister for Primary Industry John Kerin, with a proposal that would better prepare farmers for the deregulation of the industry in a commercial climate. The DSAP significantly lessened the blow of the inevitable industry restructure, and provided dairy farmers with a choice to remain in the industry or to leave with financial compensation. A levy of 11 cents per litre was also imposed upon commercial dairy based beverages.

Despite a dramatic decrease in dairy farms across the nation, many farmers believe the effects of deregulation in the absence of Rowley's initiative would have been utterly devastating. The DSAP significantly lessened the blow of the inevitable industry restructure, and provided dairy farmers with a choice to remain in the industry or to leave with financial compensation.

“We could have let commercial forces take prices down and hurt people very badly. What we did was go in front of government, put all those facts in front of them and say we think that on the first of July there ought to be some help. We put together the biggest re-structure scheme in the history of agriculture, $2.1 billion, to farmers on the basis this game is going to get hard in Western Australia, New South Wales and Queensland, you need to use this money to get yourself into the new market realities to try and be able to operate. We never ever said it was going to be easy, it was going to be tough. There was very little impact in a state like Victoria, but we had to have a national scheme,” Rowley said in an interview for ABC's Landline

== Honours, decorations, awards and distinctions ==
| Year | Honour | Status | Description |
|---|---|---|---|
| 1989 | Order of the Companion of St Michael at St George | Awarded | In 1989, Rowley received The Most Distinguished Order of the Companion of St Michael and St George for his outstanding service to the Australian dairy industry. |
| 1989/1999 | Australian Export Hero Award | Awarded | Awarded by the Export Council of Australia for contribution to "Australian Dairy Products" |
| 1996 | Rabobank Agribusiness Leader of the Year | Awarded | The Rabobank Agribusiness Leader of the Year was jointly awarded to Rowley and Woolworths CEO Roger Corbett. |
| 1997 | University of Queensland Honours Degree, Doctor of Philosophy | Awarded | In 1996, the University of Queensland awarded Rowley with an honorary PhD (Honours Degree, Doctor of Philosophy). |
| 2000 | Centenary Medal | Awarded | The Australian Government awarded Rowley with a Centenary Medal in 2000. |
| 2017 | Australian Dairy Farmers Federation (ADDF) Life Membership | Awarded | Over a decade after his retirement, Rowley was presented with a Life Membership from the Australian Dairy Farmers Federation (along with former ADFF CEO John McQueen) in recognition of his 40-year industry involvement. |

== See also ==
- Agriculture in Australia
- Category: Australian Companions of the Order of St Michael and St George
- Dairy
- Dairyfarming
