= Corran McLachlan =

New Zealand scientist and entrepreneur

- Born: Corran Norman Stuart McLachlan; 1 April 1944; Wairarapa, New Zealand
- Died: 9 August 2003 (aged 59); Wellington, New Zealand
- Education: University of Canterbury – BE (Hons); University of Cambridge – PhD
- Known for: Co-founder of A2 Corporation
- Spouse: Ulrike von Thielen (m. 1968)
- Children: 3
- Scientific career
- Fields: Chemical engineering
- Thesis: Desorption of gases from solution (1969)
- Doctoral advisor: Peter Danckwerts

Corran Norman Stuart McLachlan (1 April 1944 – 9 August 2003) was a New Zealand research scientist and entrepreneur. McLachlan is noted for his work on epidemiological research surrounding the effects of the A1 beta-casein. He believed the existence of this protein in cows’ milk to be a public health issue contributing to both heart disease and type 1 diabetes. In February 2000, McLachlan and his business partner, Howard Paterson, established A2 Corporation Limited (renamed The a2 Milk Company in April 2014) to market A2 cows’ milk, which was free from the A1 beta-casein.

== Early life, education, and family ==
McLachlan attended his local primary school where he was one of two students in his class before attending Wairarapa College in Masterton from 1957 to 1961. It was here that he developed his interest in science, a discipline he continued to pursue. In 1962, McLachlan began studying at the University of Canterbury, and graduated with a first-class honours degree in chemical engineering. He then went to the University of Cambridge, where he completed a PhD on the reactions of carbon dioxide in alkaline solutions, supervised by Peter Danckwerts, in 1969.

While at Cambridge, McLachlan met a German au pair, Ulrike von Thielen, and they were married within seven months. The couple went on to have three children.

== Career ==
In 1970, McLachlan returned to New Zealand and began working in the Chemistry Division of the Department of Scientific and Industrial Research. In 1974, he won the first United Development Corporation inventor's prize.

McLachlan first became involved in the dairy industry in 1989 when he became the managing director of Tenon Developments. In a joint venture with Morrinsville Thames Cooperative Dairy Company, they developed a method of producing cholesterol-free butter and low-fat meats using extraction technology. He remained the managing director of Tenon Developments Ltd until his death.

While the research project was dropped by the New Zealand Dairy Group, McLachlan's interest in the subject of cholesterol and heart disease remained. He spent five years investigating a potential connection between A1 beta casein protein consumption and heart disease.

In 2000, he formed A2 Corporation, backed by Howard Paterson to license technology for testing, production and use of milk containing only the A2 beta casein protein and no A1 protein (primarily which the BCM-7 peptide is a variant of) in cows' DNA.

== Research ==
McLachlan began his research into milk consumption and heart disease prevalence in different countries in 1994 and continued this work for five years. His research concluded a strong link between the consumption of the A1 beta casein protein and Ischaemic heart disease, childhood Type 1 diabetes and other ailments, and he believed that many people thought to have lactose intolerance are instead sensitive to the A1 protein. Using a genetic test, McLachlan was able to identify cows that produce only the A2 protein. McLachlan's conclusions were not accepted among all scientists; many pointed out that the research was ‘correlative, rather than proven cause and effect’.

McLachlan authored 29 scientific papers and confidential reports and was awarded 11 patents. In 1995, McLachlan was made an honorary senior research fellow of the School of Biological Sciences at the University of Auckland.

== Death ==
McLachlan died of cancer on 9 August 2003. At the time, acting chief executive of A2 Corporation, Andrew Clarke, said, "This has been a double tragedy for A2", referring to the deaths of both McLachlan and Howard Paterson within a short period of time.
