= Nick Bollettieri =

American tennis coach (1931–2022)

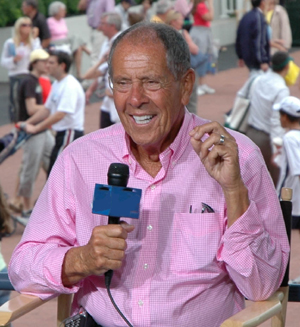
- Bollettieri at the 2006 US Open
- Born: July 31, 1931 Pelham, New York, U.S.
- Died: December 4, 2022 (aged 91) Bradenton, Florida, U.S.
- Int. Tennis HoF: 2014 (member page)
- Official website: Official website

Nicholas James Bollettieri (July 31, 1931 – December 4, 2022) was an American tennis coach. He pioneered the concept of a tennis boarding school, and helped develop many leading tennis players over several decades, including Andre Agassi, Jim Courier, Monica Seles, Venus Williams, Serena Williams, and Maria Sharapova. Bollettieri was also a tour traveling coach, the last time having been for and with Boris Becker for a span of two years.

Bollettieri was mentioned and/or profiled in several television series and documentary films, including Jason Kohn's documentary film Love Means Zero, which was premiered at the 42nd Toronto International Film Festival on September 9, 2017.

== Education ==
Born in Pelham, New York, to immigrant Italian parents, Nick Bollettieri attended Pelham Memorial High School. He was a charter member of the Beta Lambda chapter of the Omega Gamma Delta Fraternity and he graduated in 1949. In 1953, he graduated from Spring Hill College (Mobile, Alabama) with a degree in philosophy. After serving with the United States Army and attaining the rank of First Lieutenant in 1956, he turned to teaching tennis after dropping out of the University of Miami Law School. Bollettieri's first students included Brian Gottfried. His first formal tennis camp was at Wayland Academy in Beaver Dam, Wisconsin.

== Career ==
Though he had only dabbled in the sport in high school, Bollettieri was the tennis director at Dorado Beach Hotel in Puerto Rico in the late 1960s when it was a Rockefeller resort.

Moving to Longboat Key, Florida, in 1978, Bollettieri served as an instructor for the Colony Beach and Tennis Resort. In the early 1980s, Bollettieri opened the Nick Bollettieri Tennis Academy (NBTA) in Bradenton, Florida, on 40 acres (16 ha) in unincorporated Manatee County on the west coast of Florida, about fifty miles south of Tampa.

Seeing a template for other sports, International Management Group (IMG) bought the academy from Bollettieri in 1987, but Bollettieri continued to manage and play a pivotal role in the development of the tennis academy and ancillary programs. In his final years Bollettieri coached top-tier players at the academy, and spent most of his time in Bradenton.

=== Off-court ===
Bollettieri continued to teach and hold public speaking engagements worldwide, including a visit to teach students at Tri-State Athletic Club in Evansville, Indiana. He was also the instruction editor of Tennis magazine. Over the course of his life, Bollettieri wrote two memoirs: My Aces, My Faults with Dick Schaap in 1996, and Bollettieri: Changing the Game in 2014.

Bollettieri also wrote a 2001 instructional book, Bollettieri's Tennis Handbook, which covers everything from stroke techniques and strategies to skill development and physical and mental conditioning. Additionally, he was featured in the Nick Bollettieri DVD Collection, a set of ten instructional DVDs that cover a wide range of practice methods.

=== Grunting controversy ===
Bolletieri personally trained the majority of the controversially loud grunters in tennis, leading to repeated accusations that he has been deliberately teaching grunting as a novel tactic in order to give his later generations of students an edge in competitive play.

Bollettieri has denied teaching grunting as a distraction tactic, and says grunting is natural, "I prefer to use the word 'exhaling'. I think that if you look at other sports, weightlifting or doing squats or a golfer when he executes the shot or a hockey player, the exhaling is a release of energy in a constructive way". In 2011, after Danish player Caroline Wozniacki (then world no. 1) publicly accused Bollettieri's students of cheating by grunting, Women's Tennis Association Chairman Stacy Allaster stated that the WTA would be "talking to the Bollettieri academy" about the predominance of loud grunters from that institution and how it could be eliminated from the next generation of players. One year later, a division of Bollettieri's academy released a document calling grunting "unsportsmanlike" and acknowledging that it obscures the sound of string impact (as noted by Martina Navratilova), resulting in "an increase in an opponent's decision error, and a slower response time".

== Notable students ==
The earliest Bollettieri pupils to reach No. 1 were Monica Seles, Jim Courier, and Andre Agassi. Later, Marcelo Ríos climbed to the top while associated with Bollettieri. The Williams sisters had a long-standing relationship with Bollettieri, having visited the academy for years, and they have often prepared for Grand Slams there. Mary Pierce and Anna Kournikova also trained at the academy. More recent students who trained with Bollettieri include Maria Sharapova (who moved from Russia at the age of nine) and Jelena Janković (from Belgrade, Serbia, aged 12); both became no. 1. Max Mirnyi, who trained with Bollettieri for 17 years, was ranked world number 1 in men's doubles. Bollettieri's most famous coaching roles while travelling as a tour coach were with Andre Agassi from 1986 until Bollettieri ended the arrangement following the 1993 Wimbledon tournament, and with Boris Becker from December 1993 to August 1995. Before becoming a wildlife-related personality, Frank Cuesta had also attended Bollettieri's academy, and became a tennis coach himself in Thailand to open one of Bollettieri's academies there.

== Personal life ==
Bollettieri was married eight times, and had seven children. He was survived by his eighth wife, Cindi Eaton, whom he had married on April 22, 2004. The same year, they founded Camp Kaizen, a nonprofit fitness camp.

Bollettieri died at home in Bradenton, Florida, on December 4, 2022, at age 91.

== Honors ==
On May 18, 2008, Bollettieri was honored at the New York College of Health Professions with an honorary doctorate in Humane Letters for his contribution to the world of sports, fitness, and wellness.

In 2014, he was inducted to the International Tennis Hall of Fame. The following year, Bollettieri became the first white man to be inducted into the Black Tennis Hall of Fame.
