= Cancer Treatment Centers of America Championship at Surprise =

Outback Champions Series tournament

The Cancer Treatment Centers of America Championship at Surprise is a professional tennis tournament which is part of the Outback Champions Series. Its inaugural event took place on November 5–9, 2008, in Surprise, Arizona, a suburb of Phoenix, Arizona.

== Finals results ==
| Year | Champion | Runner-up | Score | Ref |
|---|---|---|---|---|
| 2009 | Todd Martin | Andre Agassi | 6–3, 7–5 | |
| 2008 | John McEnroe | Todd Martin | 3–6, 7–6(3), 11–9(TB) | |
