= Dairy Australia =

Australian government organisation

- Type: Industry Association
- Industry: Industry body
- Founded: 1 July 2003
- Headquarters: Melbourne, Victoria
- Area served: Australia
- Services: Information, networking and professional development for the post-farmgate dairy sector in Australia
- Revenue: 60,099,490 Australian dollar (2023)
- Total assets: 41,515,000 Australian dollar (2023)
- Number of employees: 204 (2023)
- Parent: Department of Agriculture and Water Resources
- Website: Dairy Australia

Dairy Australia is the Australian national body for the dairy industry, and a Research and development corporation (RDC). It is mainly funded by the Dairy Services Levy, a tax paid by farmers based on milk production. It also acts as a funding body through which the federal Department of Agriculture provides funding for rural research and development in Australia. Dairy Australia also attracts funding at project level from state governments, universities, research organisations and other dairy support organisations. It was previously known as the Dairy Research & Development Corporation.

Industry figure Pat Rowley acted as Chairman of Dairy Australia from 2003 until his retirement in 2006.

Dairy Australia have argued that adding dairy products to plant-based diets enhances the nutritional adequacy of the diet and the taste.
