= Twinlab =

Twinlab Consolidsted Corporation
- Type: Public
- Industry: Health products
- Founded: 1968
- Headquarters: Boca Raton, Florida
- Website: www.twinlab.com

Twinlab Consolidated Corporation is an American company which manufactures and markets vitamins, minerals, and bodybuilding supplements. Twinlab is based in Boca Raton, Florida.

Twinlab currently produces more than 500 different products.

== History ==
Twinlab was founded by David and Jean Blechman in 1968 and run by them and their sons – Neil, Brian, Ross, Steve and Dean. Using experience gained from over 20 years as a pharmaceutical salesman, David Blechman named the company for his two sets of twins and started marketing a liquid protein supplement from their family garage. Sales of Twinlab's only product skyrocketed in the 1970s, in part from the success of a 1976 book entitled The Last Chance Diet — When Everything Else Has Failed: Dr. Linn's Protein-Sparing Fast Program. Dr. Robert Linn was a Pennsylvania osteopath, who had begun prescribing for his overweight patients a program of fasting and four- to six-ounce daily doses of liquid protein. His book sold extremely well, and Dr. Linn's diet became the latest weight-loss fad diet. This led to increased sales for Twinlab's liquid protein. As with many fad diets, the fasting/liquid protein craze came to a halt when in late 1976 and early 1977 there were reports of the deaths of 58 people who had followed Linn's diet.

Following a U.S. Food and Drug Administration (FDA) investigation the associated coverage of the popular diet and its potential side effects by Newsweek, Parents' Magazine, and Science Digest, the liquid protein market bottomed out, and Twinlab's revenues declined sharply forcing the company to cut nearly all of its 150-person workforce.

In the 1980s Twinlab branched out formulating new vitamin and nutritional supplements and purchased a publishing company called Advanced Research Press, Inc. (ARP) publishers of the bodybuilding magazine Muscular Development and several other magazines.

David Blechman retired in 1996, and passed the title of CEO to his son Ross, while the other sons were installed as corporate officers. He died on July 7, 2000. In 2001 Twinlab sold ARP to Steve Blechman who then resigned from Twinlab.

After slumping sales in 2002, the company filed a voluntary petition for Chapter 11 reorganization with the U.S. Bankruptcy Court for the Southern District of New York in September 2003. In 2004, Twinlab Corp., Twin Laboratories Inc. and Twin Laboratories (UK) Ltd. were purchased for $65 million by IdeaSphere Inc.

Ideasphere also known as ISI brands, and which also operated as Twinlab, went on to acquire other dietary supplement brands such as Metabolife, Nature's Herbs, Alvita Teas, and a publisher, Rebus LLC.

In January 2014 Twinlab's CEO Tom Tolworthy announced that he would partner with Capstone Financial Group to raise $130M to conduct a management buyout of Twinlab and make other acquisitions, via an entity called Twinlab Consolidation Corporation. The transaction was completed in August 2014.

In July 2018, Anthony Zolezzi, founder of Bubba Gump Shrimp Company and Pet Promise Natural Dog Food was named CEO of Twinlab, after being appointed to the Board of Directors the previous May.

== Variations ==
Vitamin variations are as follows;

- Daily One Caps without Iron
- NAC N-Acetyl-Cysteine
- High Potency Natural Magnesium
- Women's Ultra Daily Multivitamin
