= Ark Tribe =

Ark Tribe (born circa 1962 - 18 May 2018) was an Australian construction worker and unionist who was prosecuted for refusing to attend a meeting with investigators from the Australian Building and Construction Commission (ABCC) in 2008. He was acquitted on 24 November 2010, an event with significant political implications for Australian labour politics.

== Background ==
Following the controversial Royal Commission into the Building and Construction Industry (2001–2003), established by the Howard government, the ABCC was created in 2005, to regulate industrial relations in the Australian construction sector. Consequently, the activities of the Construction, Forestry, Mining and Energy Union (CFMEU), as well as other unions, were restricted more than unions in other industries. Critics alleged that the ABCC focussed exclusively on attacking workers and ignored violations of safety and non-payment of wages by employers.

Construction workers alleged to have engaged in unauthorised union activities could be forced to attend meetings with ABCC investigators. Failure to cooperate was punishable by jail terms of up to six months.

== Prosecution ==
In 2008, Ark Tribe attended a safety meeting at a construction site at Flinders University, in Adelaide, South Australia. Workers at the meeting discussed ongoing safety concerns at the site and carried out a union investigation into conditions before resuming work.

The ABCC afterward summoned Tribe to a meeting to determine the legality of their actions. When he refused to obey, prosecutors for the ABCC commenced legal proceedings against him. Steven Dolphin, the Principal of specialist industrial law firm Lieschke & Weatherill Lawyers, and prominent Adelaide silk Michael Abbott QC, represented Tribe throughout his lengthy court proceedings.

The CFMEU and supporters turned out to protest at court proceedings, with hundreds present for the first day of his trial on 15 June 2010, including prominent international civil rights campaigners Gerry Conlon and Paddy Hill.

On 24 November 2010, Ark Tribe was cleared of the charges against him. The decision had political implications for the relationship between the Australian Labor Party and the union movement, especially with regards to the latter's campaign to have the Australian Building and Construction Commission abolished.
