= Queensland Council of Unions =

Australian trade union organisation

Queensland Unions
- Queensland Council of Unions
- Abbreviation: QCU
- Established: September 1, 1885; 141 years ago
- Type: Trade union
- Headquarters: TLC Building, 16 Peel Street
- Location: South Brisbane, Australia
- Members: 400,000+ members from 27 affiliated unions (2025)
- General Secretary: Jacqueline King
- Senior Vice-President: Sarah Beaman; Peter Allen
- Vice-President: Rohan Webb; Terry Burke; Jennifer Thomas; Sally Gunner; Stacey Schinnerl; Sean Kelly
- Honorary Treasurer: Wendy Streets
- Publication: The Worker (1890–1974)
- Affiliations: Australian Council of Trade Unions
- Website: www.qldunions.com
- Formerly called: Trades and Labour Council (1885–1993); Australian Council of Trade Unions Queensland Branch (1993–1999)

The Queensland Council of Unions (QCU), also known as "Queensland Unions", is the peak body representing trade union organisations in Queensland, Australia.

As of 2024, 28 unions and 13 regional branches are affiliated with the QCU. The QCU represents unions covering around 400,000 Queensland workers. Founded in 1885, the QCU's stated aims are to achieve industrial, social and political justice for Queensland workers.

It is affiliated with the Australian Council of Trade Unions (ACTU). Its offices are located in the suburb of South Brisbane, Queensland.

The management structure of the QCU is made up of a committee of management and an executive of representatives comprised from affiliated unions.

The history of the QCU is intertwined with the history of the Australian Labor Party (ALP) and the Australian labour movement generally. The QCU was formed in 1885, but in 1889 it disbanded and all its roles and responsibilities were transferred to a newly formed peak body, the Australian Labor Federation (ALF) (which despite its name was restricted to Queensland). In 1902 the QCU reformed, but again, in 1911, all its delegates moved to the ALF. In 1914 the ALF itself dissolved, with its affiliates moving to the growing Australian Workers Union (AWU). At this time the roles of the QCU were shared by a number of labour organisations, including the Brisbane Industrial Council, the Eight Hour Union and the Brisbane Trades Hall Board. At the end of World War I in 1918 Queensland unions regrouped but it was another four years before 46 unions reformed the Queensland Trades and Labour Council, now known as the QCU.

== History ==
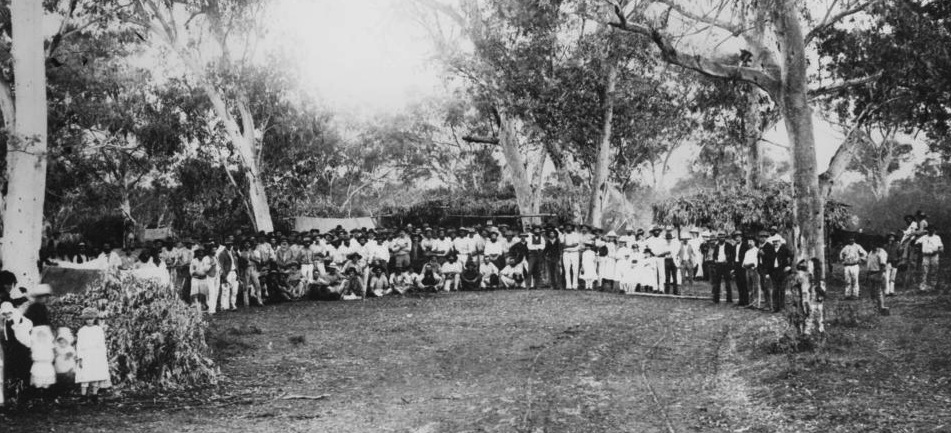
Shearers' strike camp, Hughenden, central Queensland, 1891.

The origins of the organisation lie in the rapid rise of the Australian labour movement in the 1880s. Due to a mining and pastoral boom in the regions outside South East Queensland there was an influx of large numbers of immigrant workers, while in Brisbane and South East Queensland a number of small craft unions were established. On 18 August 1885 a meeting of union secretaries decided to form the Trades and Labour Council, which came into being on 1 September 1885. The next year, 1886, the new labour organisation was sanctioned by the Liberal government of the day (led by the then moderate liberal Samuel Walker Griffith) which passed the Queensland Trade Union Act, legitimising trade unionism in the colony.

In the late 1880s, Queensland was a vast, decentralised colony where predominantly white, male workers were clustered in regional areas around the rural extractive industries – the mines and the great shearing sheds. Queensland had no industrial base to speak of, even in the south east corner. Workers had been lured to Queensland, mainly from Britain, with the promise of being self-made men. The percentage of successful immigrants to become wealthy pastoralists, mining magnates or industrialists was very small – by 1887 most immigrant workers in the mining industries were wage-labourers for a mere 30 mining companies. The wool industry was similarly consolidated. In New South Wales there were 3,000 shearing sheds. In the whole of Queensland there were only 150. The forcing together of large numbers of bitter, disillusioned men encouraged working-class mateship, heavy drinking and a spectacular growth of trade unionism in the colony. Class activism was further fuelled by several firebrand journalists of the day, notably William Lane who worked on the Brisbane Courier and the Brisbane Observer before starting the Boomerang in 1887. The racy, iconoclastic Boomerang took the colony by storm, propagating socialist and republican ideas. Henry Lawson wrote under the name Joe Swallow.

This was a period of rapid growth and saw the establishment of several major unions. The Queensland Shearers Union was formed in January 1887 to help combat pastoralists' attempts to reduce the shearing rate. By August 1889 it had close to three thousand members. The Amalgamated Shearers' Union of Australasia was formed in 1887, mostly representing workers in southern states, eventually in 1894 merging with other rural-based unions to form the Australian Workers' Union. The Queensland Labourers' Union was established at Saltern Creek in 1888 as the Central Queensland Labourers' Union, then in 1892 amalgamated with the Queensland Shearers' Union to form the Amalgamated Workers Union of Queensland. The Queensland Teachers Union was established in 1889. The Amalgamated Workers Union merged with the Australian Workers Union in 1904.

The Fifth Intercolonial Trade Union Congress in Brisbane in 1889 accepted the proposal to form the Australian Labour Federation, with the inaugural meeting on 11 June 1889. The QCU disbanded, transferring its roles and responsibilities to the new peak body. For all intents and purposes, this was the QCU continuing under another name. The Australian Labour Federation was an attempt to create an Australia-wide peak body, but after failing to attract support outside Queensland it was dissolved in 1914 when its main supporter, the Amalgamated Workers Union merged with the Australian Workers' Union.

In 1887 William Shand, aide-de-camp to the Queensland Governor Anthony Musgrave, was sharply critical of the fanciful promises made to immigrant workers to make their fortune in a so-called workers paradise, when in fact poorer workers lived in wooden shanties cobbled together from old biscuit boxes and wine cases. Shand was even more alarmed at how the growing trade union movement was drafting new arrivals into unions, these labour organisations already having had some success in hiking up wages and blocking non-union (scab) labour. At this time, 1877, there were 2,500 union members registered under the Queensland Trade Union Act. By 1890 this number had ballooned more than eight-fold to 21,500. Even Liberals were caught up in the excitement. In 1889 Samuel Walter Griffith, barrister and 9th Premier of Queensland, after being defeated by the conservative Thomas McIlwraith in 1888, wrote radical articles advocating state intervention to curb capitalism, redistribute wealth, protect the weak and enforce the rule of freedom. Griffith's radical reformer phase was short lived however, as in 1890 he suddenly betrayed his radical friends and became Premier again at the head of an unlikely alliance with McIlwraith, forming the so-called "Griffilwraith" government. Also on the political front, Thomas Glassey became Australia's first Labour parliamentarian, representing Ipswich coalminers. He was joined in 1890 by John Plumper Hoolan. Early industrial action had international support, with the British Seamen's Union backing the Queensland Shearers Union to victory in the Jondaryan dispute, by blocking transport and handling of Jondaryan wool bales.

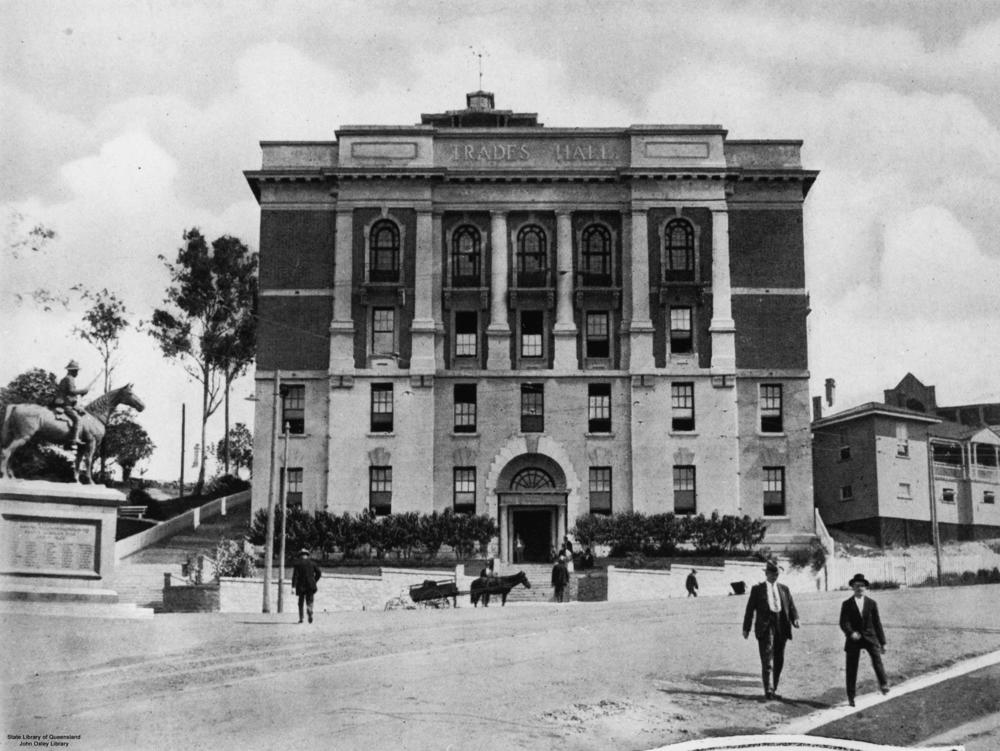
The Brisbane Trades Hall, ca. 1928

The Brisbane Worker newspaper was established in 1890 by the ALF under the editorship of William Lane, who remained in the post until 1892. This was a time of prolonged and bitter industrial disputes, with the first of the great Australian strikes in the 1890s: the 1890 Australian Maritime Dispute, followed by the 1891 Shearers' strike, and the 1894 Shearers strike.

A Labour Council had formed again by 1903, but in 1911 all affiliates transferred to the ALF. In January 1914 the ALF itself effectively dissolved, as many of its affiliates had been swallowed by the Australian Workers' Union. A new organisation called the Brisbane Industrial Council was formed midyear. Other inter-union organisations included the Eight Hours Union and the Brisbane Trades Hall Board, responsible for managing Brisbane Trades Hall. During the First World War closer unity between labour movement organisations was explored culminating in a conference in September 1918 attended by 42 unions adopting an amalgamation scheme. After lengthy negotiations, on 12 April 1922 the Trades and Labour Council of Queensland was established by 46 unions.

In 1993 the organisation was renamed the Australian Council of Trade Unions Queensland Branch to reflect its primary function and role. The name again changed in 1999 to Queensland Council of Unions to rebuild its local identity as a peak organisation for Queensland trade unions.

Other important industrial disputes in Queensland include the 1912 Brisbane General Strike, the 1948 Queensland Railway strike, the SEQEB dispute and the 1998 Australian waterfront dispute.

In 2012, Queensland Labor leader Annastacia Palaszczuk announced the ALP and the QCU were providing seed funding for the TJ Ryan Foundation to provide a forum for debate on policies and policy development. On 27 February 2014 the TJ Ryan Foundation was launched, taking the form of an online platform for the publication of commentary and analysis by public policy academics and experts.

== Responsibilities ==
As a peak body for the Queensland trade unions the objective of the QCU is to achieve industrial, social and political justice for Queensland workers, by

- supporting and co-ordinating affiliates to improve industrial conditions and increase membership
- being the public voice of the Queensland union movement
- influencing government and public policy at an industrial, political and social level
- building awareness of the union movement through education, training and campaigning, and
- representing the Queensland movement statewide, nationally and internationally.

Some of the functions and services of the QCU include research, presentation of state general wage cases, presentation of test cases in the Industrial Relations Commission, co-ordination of multi-union negotiations, preparation of submissions for committees of inquiry and review and providing training opportunities for affiliated union delegates.

== Structure ==
Management structure of the QCU is made up of a committee of management (acting as leadership and secretariat for an executive which is made up of 39 representatives, one from each of the affiliated unions). The 39-member Executive meets once a month.

The QCU Management Committee and Executive are assisted by several staff. As well as the President and general secretary, staff positions include a Campaign Officer, Research and Policy Officer, and a Media and Communications Officer. A number of Project Officers, Information Officers and Organisers carry out roles to assist the management committee, the executive and members of affiliated unions in areas including industrial matters, workers compensation information and education. Administrative staff positions include Office Manager, Administrative Assistants and Finance Officers.

The QCU has a number of committees leading discussion about issues including:

- Occupational Health & Safety
- Recruitment & Retention
- Skills & Industry, and
- Worker's Compensation.

Several major unions are not affiliates including the Shop, Distributive and Allied Employees' Association, the CFMEU, and the Electrical Trades Union.

== Affiliates ==
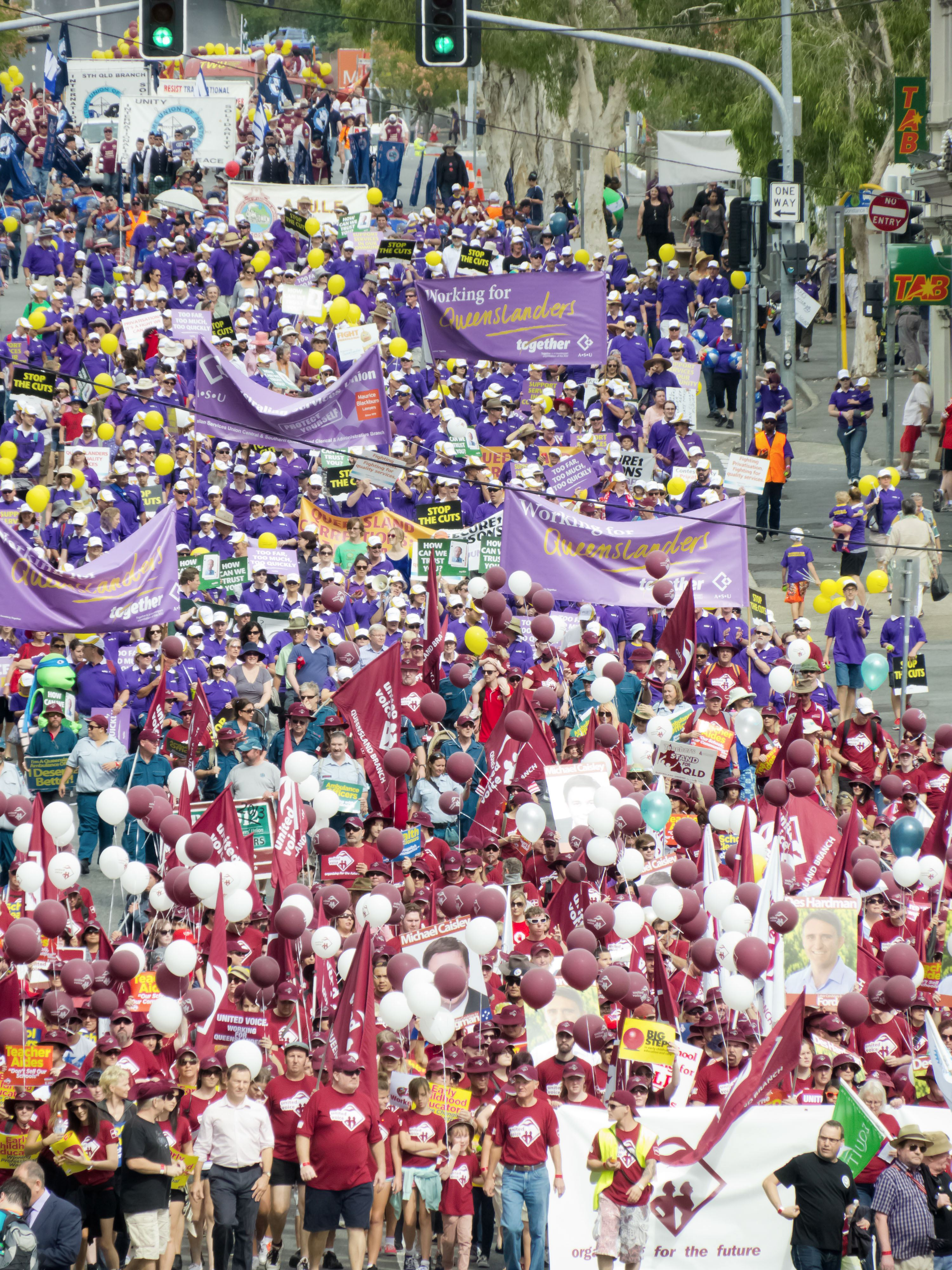
QCU Affiliated Unions Marching on Labour Day 5 May 2013

The Affiliates of the QCU are the trade unions which choose to become part of the peak body and are represented on the executive. One representative, or delegate, from each union is chosen to be on the executive which makes all decisions about the policies and directions the QCU takes in carrying out the interests of its member unions. Sometimes federal unions or unions in other states and territories may not be affiliated with their own state or federal counterparts of the QCU, which nevertheless are affiliated in Queensland. For example, on 4 July 2011 the Independent Education Union of Australia disaffiliated from the ACTU (the federal peak body) due to concerns relating to education policy but is affiliated with the QCU in Queensland. The ACTU maintains a national directory of affiliated unions and union officials. Because of widespread amalgamations in the period 1983–1999 and still continuing, names of trade unions have changed, with some retaining parts of their former identities, often seen in historical banners on Labour Day.

- Australian Institute of Marine and Power Engineers Representing the industrial and professional interests of marine & power engineers.
- Australasian Meat Industry Employees' Union Queensland Branch. Representing workers in the meat industry including abattoirs, poultry sheds and the retail sector.
- Australian Manufacturing Workers Union Representing manufacturing workers in food and confectionery, metal and engineering, printing and packaging, technical, supervisory and administrative areas and vehicle building.
- Australian Services Union Central and Southern Queensland Clerical and Administrative Branch. Representing worders in clerical administration including PAs, clerks, receptionists, admin officers, call centre operators, customer service officers, reservation agents and telemarketers.
- Australian Worker's Union, representing a broad range of coverage across several major industries, primarily focusing on unskilled trades within agriculture, construction, mining, manufacturing, public administration, and utilities.
- Communication Workers Union of Australia A division of the Community and Public Sector Union covering workers in telecommunications and postal industries.
- Community and Public Sector Union Covering workers in the public sector, telecommunications, call centres, employment services, commercial broadcasting, the aviation industry and science and research.
- Financial Services Union Covering workers in financial institutions, banks and across the financial services sector.
- Independent Education Union of Australia Queensland and NT Branch representing principals, teachers and other education staff working in non-government schools and colleges, early childhood centres, and other non-government educational institutions.
- Media Entertainment & Arts Alliance Covering the media, entertainment, sports and arts industries.
- Maritime Union of Australia Queensland. Covering stevedoring and dock workers (wharfies) divers, workers on ferries, in offshore oil and gas, port services and shipping.
- National Tertiary Education Union Queensland Division. Members in tertiary education including universities, TAFE colleges, research institutes and adult education providers.
- Queensland Nurses and Midwives' Union The union for nurses and midwives in public and private health and aged care in Queensland.
- Queensland Police Union Representing Queensland police officers.
- Professionals Australia A network for professionals including engineers, scientists, pharmacists, architects, managers, contractors and consultants.
- The Services Union Representing workers in Local Authorities (including Brisbane City Council), Social and Community Sector (SACS), Energy, Rail, Ports and North Queensland Clerical and Administrative Industries.
- Queensland Teachers' Union representing teachers in primary, secondary and special schools, senior colleges, TAFE colleges and other educational facilities.
- Rail, Tram and Bus Union covers employees of Queensland Rail, QR National, Brisbane City Council, GoldLinq, PNQ, Transfield, QRX and more.
- Timber, Furnishing & Textile Union, representing workers in the timber, furnishing, pulp, paper, textile, clothing, and footwear manufacturing industries.
- Transport Workers Union of Australia Covering members in aviation, passenger transport, local government, waste, cash in transit and oil and gas.
- Together Representing public sector workers, formed by the amalgamation of the Queensland Public Sector Union and the Australian Services Union with offices in Brisbane, Bundaberg, Cairns, Maryborough, Rockhampton, Toowoomba and Townsville.
- United Firefighters Union Queensland
- United Workers Union was formed in 2019 after a national merger between United Voice and the National Union of Workers, covering workers who feed you, educate you, provide care for you, keep your communities safe and get you the goods you need.

== Labour Day ==
On 1 March 1858, stonemasons working for John Petrie won the eight-hour day, which was first commemorated on 1 March 1865. Initially only those workers who had achieved an eight-hour day were allowed to march in Eight Hour Day processions. By 1890, at least 11 unions had achieved significant reduction in hours and improvement of conditions and all workers were allowed to participate in the march from 1890.

During the 1891 Shearers Strike in Barcaldine, striking shearers held a procession on May Day, 1 May 1890, with the first Brisbane May Day march in 1893. Eight Hour Day was formally changed to the first Monday in May in 1901, when it was gazetted as a public holiday by the Queensland government. In 1912 the day was renamed Labour Day.

The Labour Day march in Brisbane is an organised procession of the Australian labour movement which parades through the streets of Brisbane ending at a park where a festival takes place to entertain participants and their families.

== See also ==
- List of unions
- History of Queensland
