= Timber, Furnishing and Textiles Union =

Pending Australian trade union

- Abbreviation: TFTU
- Predecessor: CFMEU Manufacturing Division
- Formation: 17 April 2026
- Headquarters: 165 Bouverie St, Carlton, Victoria, Australia
- Members: Approx. 8,000 (CFMEU Manufacturing Division)
- National Secretary: Michael O'Connor
- Key people: Leo Skourdoumbis (Senior Assistant National Secretary); Denise Campbell-Burns (Divisional President, Secretary Pulp and Paper Workers District); Jenny Kruschel (Textile, Clothing and Footwear National Secretary)
- Website: www.tftu.org.au

The Timber, Furnishing and Textiles Union (TFTU) is a trade union in Australia that represents workers in the timber, furnishing, pulp, paper, textile, clothing, and footwear manufacturing industries. It was formed out of the Construction, Forestry and Maritime Employees Union (CFMEU) Manufacturing Division, which traces its origins to two former organisations; the Australian Timber and Allied Industries Union (ATAIU) and the Textile, Clothing and Footwear Union of Australia (TCFUA).

== History ==
The TFTU has its origins in two historical trade unions, the Australian Timber and Allied Industries Union (ATAIU) and the Textile, Clothing and Footwear Union of Australia (TCFUA), both of which would eventually become part of the CFMEU. The ATAIU was formed from a merger of the Australian Timber Workers Union (ATWU) and the Pulp and Paper Workers Federation of Australia (PPWF), which in turn went on to amalgamate with the Building Workers' Industrial Union of Australia (BWIU) and was then absorbed into the Construction, Forestry and Mining Employees Union (CFMEU) in 1992. In 2018, the TCFUA amalgamated with the then-Forestry and Furnishing Products Division of the CFMEU to form the Manufacturing Division, which constituted one of three main branches of the CFMEU alongside the Construction and General Division and Maritime Union of Australia (MUA).

In October 2024, following revelations of corruption and bikie gang infiltration in the Construction and General Division, CFMEU Manufacturing Division Secretary Michael O'Connor lodged an application with the Fair Work Commission to demerge the division, and become a new standalone union by the name of the Timber, Furnishing and Textiles Union. According to O'Connor, this decision came about as a result of timber and textile workers no longer wanting to be associated with the CFMEU's construction division. It was also attributed to dissatisfaction with the centralisation of trade union activities under the CFMEU, with the recent demerger of the Mining and Energy Union (MEU) cited as an example of growing discontent among the CFMEU's smaller divisions.

In early 2025, the Australian Electoral Commission organised a secret ballot for the demerger, which ran from 24 February until 14 April. According to New South Wales District Secretary Alison Rudman, the TFTU would have a "laser focus on the issues that impact all our members, like wood supply, recognition of their skills, and the protection of timber jobs in timber towns". Ms Rudman also noted that legislation to approve the demerger application was supported by all federal MPs except for the Greens.

In April 2025, the Australian Financial Review reported that members of the Manufacturing Division had voted overwhelmingly to leave the CFMEU and form a standalone union. Of the division's approximately 8,000 members, 3,553 voted in favour of disaffiliation, with 324 voting against, for a total of 91.6% of participants approving the demerger. Following the vote, O'Connor stated that he would begin the formal steps required to complete the demerger and register the TFTU as a separate entity under law.

In late April, Michael O’Connor condemned then-federal opposition leader Peter Dutton for threatening to cut government programs such as the National Reconstruction Fund, Future Made in Australia and the Housing Australia Future Fund, which he claimed would jeopardise the future of the timber and forestry industry. However, he stopped short of endorsing Anthony Albanese or any party or candidate in the 2025 federal election.

The TFTU was formally registered with the Fair Work Commission on 17 April 2026.
