= Associated Pulp and Paper Mills =

Defunct Australian pulp and paper company

- Company type: Private
- Industry: Pulp and paper
- Founded: 1936
- Defunct: 2010
- Fate: Defunct
- Headquarters: Burnie, Tasmania, Australia
- Area served: Australia, international exports
- Products: Newsprint, fine paper, hardboard, packaging
- Parent: Various (prior to closure)

Associated Pulp and Paper Mills (APPM) was an Australian pulp and paper manufacturing company, established in 1936. Based in Burnie, Tasmania, the company played a significant role in the development of the pulp and paper industry in Australia, producing newsprint, fine paper, and packaging materials. At its peak, APPM was a major industrial employer in Tasmania, providing thousands of jobs and fostering regional economic growth. However, increased foreign competition, industrial disputes, and economic pressures led to its eventual closure in 2010.

== History ==
=== Establishment and early years ===
Although APPM was officially founded in 1936, planning for the mill dates back to the 1920s. Land for the operation was acquired in 1927, and by December 1938, the first paper made from eucalypt pulp was produced at the site.

During its early years, APPM focused on reducing Australia's dependence on imports. The outbreak of World War II further strengthened the company's position, as demand for locally produced paper surged due to supply chain disruptions affecting imported products.

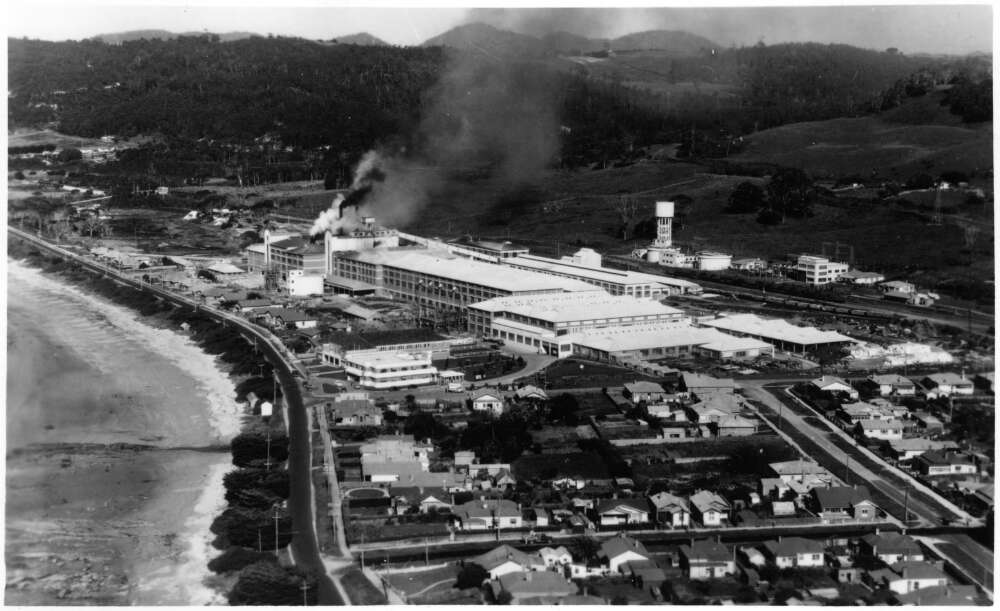
Associated Pulp & Paper Mills factory and head office buildings, c. 1948

=== Post-war expansion and industrial dominance ===
Following World War II, APPM entered a period of ‘’rapid industrial growth’’, transforming from a regional manufacturer into one of Australia’s leading pulp and paper producers. The economic expansion of the 1950s and 1960s increased demand for newsprint, fine paper, packaging materials, and hardboard, driving APPM to undertake major upgrades to its facilities in Burnie and Wesley Vale.

==== Expansion of Burnie and Wesley Vale Mills ====
By the early 1950s, APPM’s Burnie mill had expanded into a ‘’large-scale industrial complex’’, covering an area of 200,000 m^{2} (2,200,000 sq ft) (20 ha (49 acres)). The main building measured 964 ft (294 m) in length, with a width varying between 150 ft (46 m) and 220 ft (67 m), and an average height of 50 ft (15 m) at the eaves.

To increase production capacity, APPM invested in high-speed paper machines, capable of significantly higher output and efficiency than earlier models. The largest machine, installed in the 1950s, featured an 85 ft (26 m) wire and a production width of nearly 16 ft (4.9 m). Operating at speeds of 800 feet per minute (244 m/min (800 ft/min)), this machine alone could produce 75 tonnes of paper per day. A second, narrower machine, added later, had a capacity of 25 tonnes per day, increasing the total daily output to 100 tonnes.

==== Industrial output and product line expansion ====
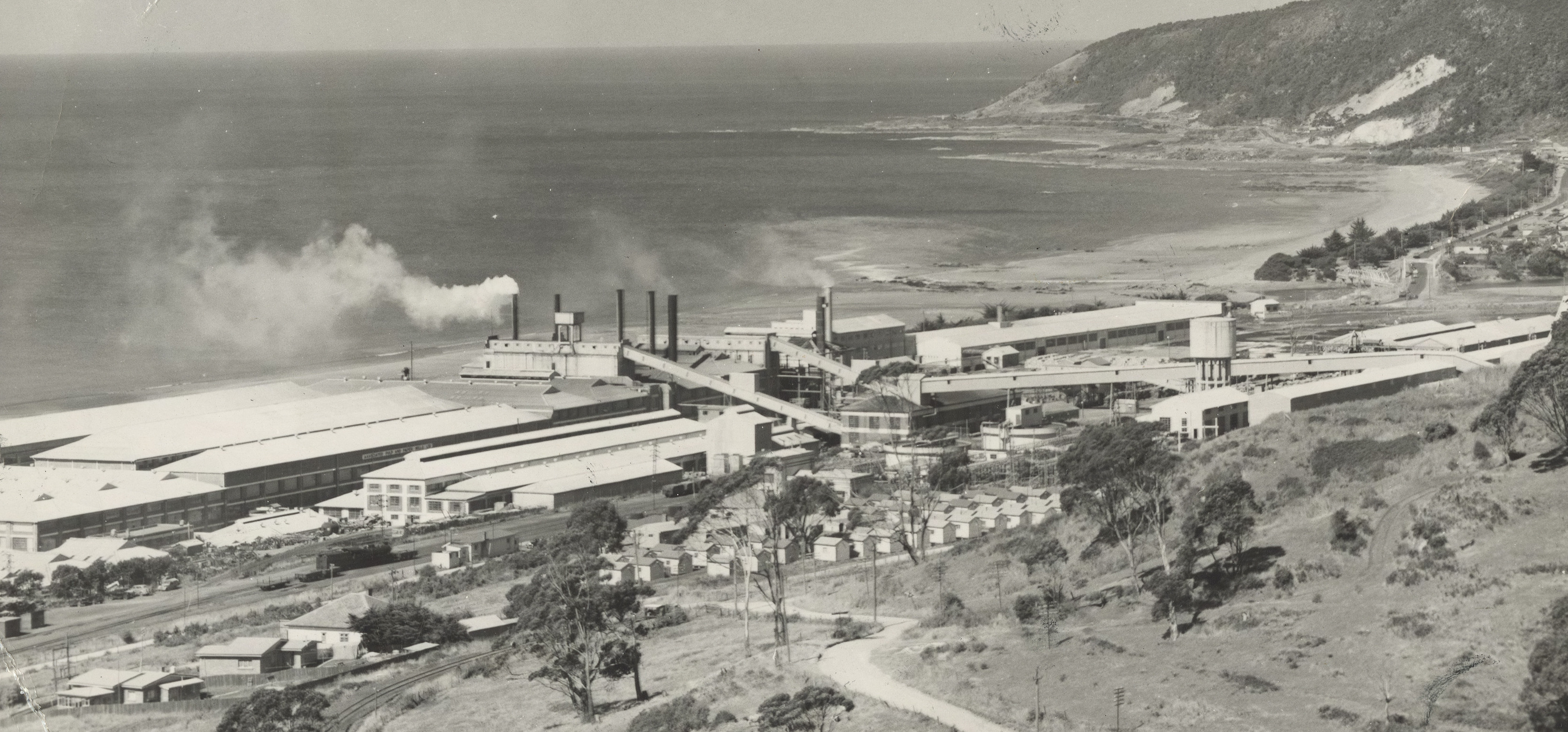
Mill and workers' huts, c. 1950s

APPM's post-war growth saw the diversification of its product range, responding to increased demand from domestic and international markets. By the 1960s, its mills produced:

- Newsprint – Supplied to leading Australian newspapers.
- Fine writing and printing paper – Used for books, official documents, and high-end stationery.
- Hardboard – Manufactured at Wesley Vale as a cost-effective alternative to imported materials.
- Watermarked bonds, duplicating paper, and cartridge paper – Essential for business and government use.
- High-opacity coated paper – Developed for premium printing and packaging applications.

By modernising production techniques, APPM was able to reduce costs, improve quality, and compete with international suppliers.

==== Technological advancements and industry leadership ====
During the 1950s and 1960s, APPM was at the forefront of technological advancements, implementing innovations that enhanced efficiency, sustainability, and product quality. Key developments included:

- Adoption of the Soda Pulping Process – Unlike the sulphite process, which generated large quantities of waste bleach liquor, APPM adopted the soda process, which used caustic soda to extract cellulose fibres. This resulted in stronger, higher-quality pulp while reducing environmental impact.
- Automated Chemical Recovery Systems – APPM developed an advanced soda recovery system, allowing the mill to recycle caustic soda and generate steam from spent pulping liquor, reducing waste and energy consumption.
- Supercalendering for High-Gloss Paper – The Burnie mill was one of the first in Australia to introduce high-speed supercalendering, a friction-based finishing process that produced ultra-smooth, glossy paper for high-end printing applications.
- Precision Watermarking Technology – APPM pioneered custom watermarking techniques, producing security-grade papers used by government agencies and banks.
- Hydro-Electric Power Integration – The company leveraged Tasmania's hydro-electric resources, ensuring a reliable and sustainable power supply for continuous production.

These advancements placed APPM among the most advanced paper manufacturers in the Southern Hemisphere and aligned its production standards with major international mills in Europe and North America.

==== International comparisons and competitiveness ====
By the mid-20th century, APPM had positioned itself as a major force in the global paper industry. While North America and Europe continued to dominate the market, APPM was one of the largest |paper manufacturers in the Asia-Pacific region, rivalled only by mills in Japan and New Zealand.

In contrast to many European mills, which relied on imported pulp, APPM benefited from Tasmania’s vast eucalypt forests, securing a long-term, cost-effective fibre supply. The company's forestry management practices ensured access to timber resources for at least 60 years, while also initiating afforestation programs to maintain sustainability.

The efficiency of APPM's Burnie mill was also comparable to leading Scandinavian paper producers, with its high-speed machines and chemical recovery processes reducing waste and improving energy efficiency.

By the late 1960s, APPM had become a critical part of Australia’s manufacturing industry, with its products used nationwide and exported internationally. Its technical expertise, large-scale production, and adoption of modern papermaking techniques solidified its status as a leader in Australian industrial history.

=== Workplace culture and technological investment ===
APPM was known for its strong commitment to employee welfare. Workers were provided with access to company-supported doctors, dentists, and banking services, and workplace injuries were met with financial and medical support for employees and their families. For a period between the late 1950s and 1960s, acclaimed American scientist and artist Bern Porter worked for APPM in Burnie.

The company also prioritised technological advancements, particularly during the 1970s and 1980s. Substantial investments were made to modernise papermaking machinery, ensuring that the mill remained competitive in an evolving industry. Even though APPM utilised chlorine-based processes for paper production, its efficiency and quality standards were among the highest in the world at the time.

=== Economic pressures and decline ===
By the 1960s, APPM faced increasing competition from cheaper imports, particularly from Asia-Pacific paper manufacturers. Despite government interventions such as the Bounty (Paper) Act 1980, the company's market position weakened. Rising energy prices, inflation, and the increasing strength of the Australian dollar compounded these challenges.

Throughout the 1980s and early 1990s, ongoing industrial disputes between management and workers further strained APPM's financial position. In 1992, a major union dispute led to a temporary mill shutdown, marking a turning point in the company's decline.

=== Closure and legacy ===
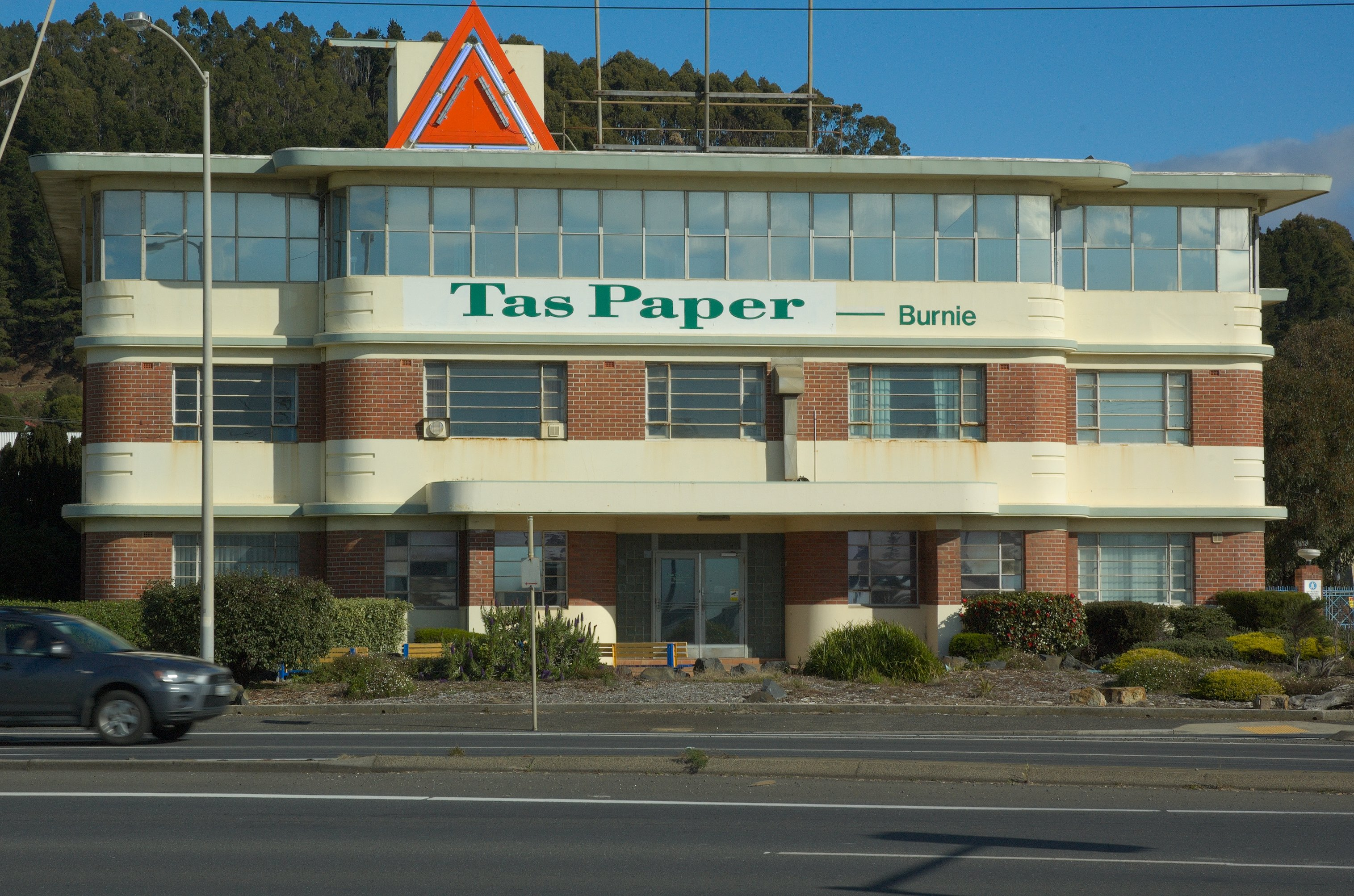
Former head offices, c. 2012

APPM continued to operate under different corporate ownership structures until its eventual closure in 2010. By this time, the company had been acquired by PaperlinX, which cited ongoing financial losses and an inability to find a viable buyer as reasons for shutting down operations.

The closure resulted in the loss of over 220 jobs in Burnie alone, with a total of 421 positions eliminated when combined with the closure of the company's Wesley Vale mill. The announcement was met with disappointment and concern, as many employees had spent decades working at the mill. Kerry Saward, a former fitter and turner who worked at APPM for nearly 40 years, described the impact as devastating, stating that many long-term employees struggled to transition to new employment opportunities.

Although the mill was completely demolished by 2013, efforts have been made to preserve its history. The site underwent redevelopment for new industrial ventures, while archival records and former employees' accounts have contributed to documenting its legacy. The site where the main mill once stood is now occupied by a Bunnings warehouse.

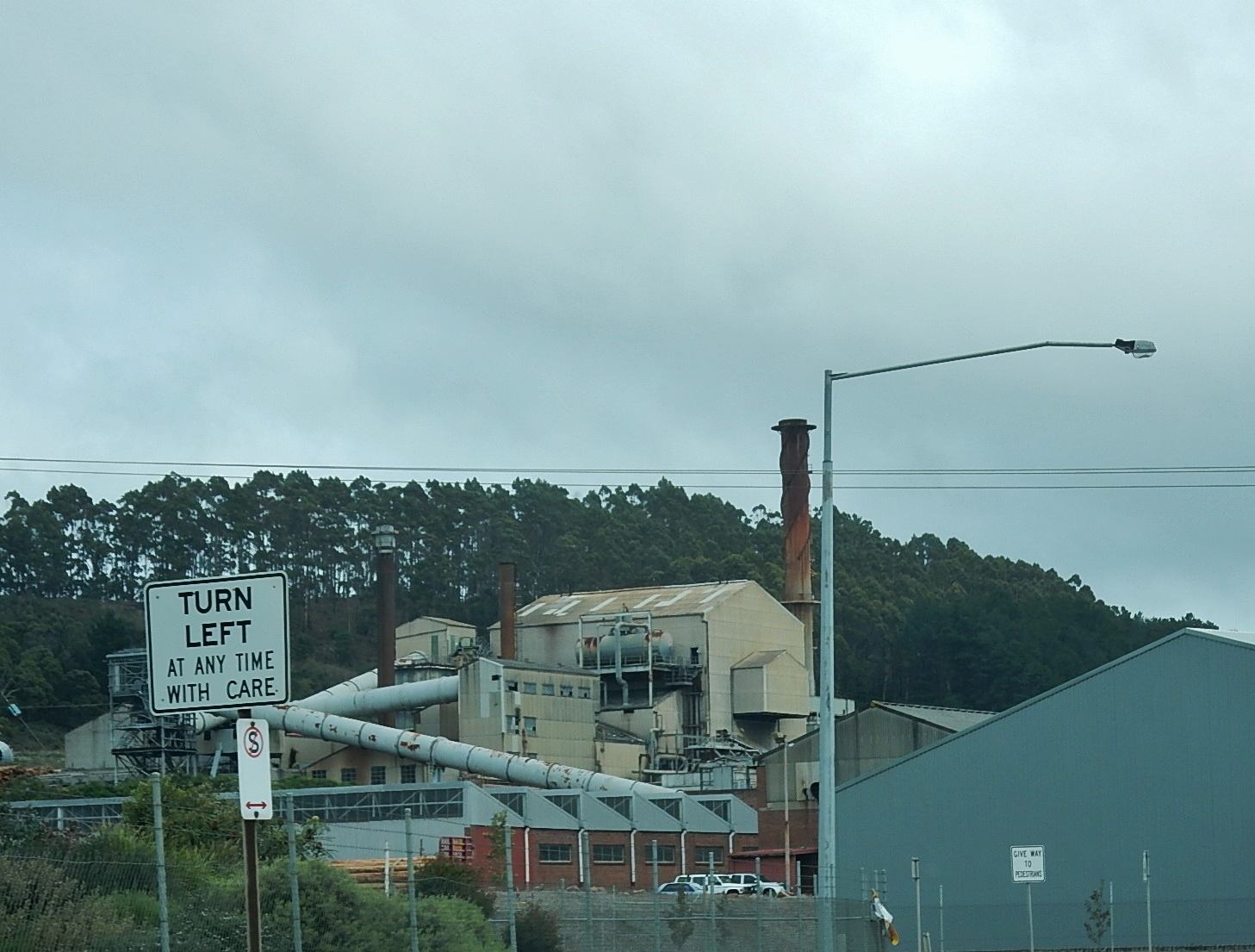
Dilapidated mill buildings, c. 2016

== Environmental concerns ==
Throughout its operation, APPM faced criticism over its environmental impact, particularly regarding water and air pollution from its mills in Burnie and Wesley Vale. Environmental groups, local industries, and conservationists raised concerns about the discharge of effluent into Bass Strait and the potential harm to marine ecosystems, farmland, and air quality.

In the late 1980s, APPM proposed a large new pulp mill at Wesley Vale, which was met with strong opposition from community groups such as the Campaign to Stop the Wesley Vale Pulp Mill (CROPS), the Tasmanian Wilderness Society, local farmers, and the fishing industry. Critics argued that the proposed mill would produce dioxins, highly toxic pollutants linked to long-term environmental and health risks. APPM's own environmental impact statement acknowledged dioxin production but downplayed its potential effects.

Concerns were also raised about effluent treatment. The fishing industry insisted that any new pulp mill should have primary, secondary, and tertiary wastewater treatment before releasing effluent into the ocean. However, opponents argued that the proposed secondary treatment system was insufficient and cost-driven rather than environmentally responsible.

=== Legal challenges and protests ===
APPM's environmental record continued to face scrutiny into the 1990s. In 1992, legal action was launched against the company over claims that one of its mills was polluting the Shoalhaven River in New South Wales. A university student, supported by the Australian Conservation Foundation, sought to have the mill's licence revoked by the New South Wales Environment Protection Authority, arguing that its waste discharge was harmful to the river system.

This legal challenge sparked a large-scale backlash from local workers and businesses, with more than 2,000 people protesting against the potential closure of the mill. Protestors, including local government representatives, warned that the legal case could lead to significant job losses, as the Shoalhaven mill employed thousands of people directly and indirectly.

=== Industrial Processes and pollution management ===
APPM used various pulp-making techniques, including the soda process, which was chosen for its lower environmental impact compared to the sulphite process. The latter was known for producing large quantities of waste bleach liquor, which would require direct discharge into rivers. However, despite the use of the soda process, APPM's operations still generated concerns over chemical waste, odour pollution, and the impact of effluent discharge on local water bodies.

The company implemented some environmental controls over time, including wastewater treatment improvements and afforestation efforts to ensure a long-term timber supply. Nonetheless, environmental campaigners and affected industries continued to push for stricter controls and greater transparency regarding APPM's pollution management.

== See also ==
- BurnieBoard
- Boyer Mill
- Pulp and Paper Workers Federation of Australia

== Bibliography ==
- "Tasmania: who wants a pulp mill?". Tribune. No. 2539. New South Wales, Australia. 2 November 1988. p. 3 – via National Library of Australia.
- "Thousands protest at threat to paper mill". The Canberra Times. Vol. 66, no. 20, 937. Australian Capital Territory, Australia. 9 August 1992. p. 2 – via National Library of Australia.
- "Pulp and Paper Manufacture from Eucalypts". The Advocate. Tasmania, Australia. 22 February 1939. p. 2 (Supplement to The Advocate) – via National Library of Australia.
- Ford, Sean (13 April 2010). "Final chapter closing on paper mill history". The Advocate.
- Woods, Rodney (29 June 2023). "Putting families first helped mill produce 'world's best' paper". The Advocate.
- "Rise and Fall of an Industrial Cathedral". Thomas Ryan Photography. 12 August 2020.
- Davis, Mark (9 April 1992). "APPM shuts mill after union dispute". Australian Financial Review.
- Australia. Parliament (1980). "Bounty (Paper) Act. Return for period ...".
- Master Builders' Federation of Australia; Illuminating Engineering Society of Australia (N.S.W.) (1953). "New Tasmanian Industry: Local Hardboard Replaces Imported". Building, Lighting and Engineering.
