= FWBC =

FWBC may refer to:

- Fair Work Building and Construction
- Faithful Word Baptist Church, a church led by Steven L. Anderson
