= John Lloyd (Australian public servant) =

John Lloyd PSM

Australian Public Service Commissioner
- In office December 2014 – 08 Aug 2018

Personal details
- Born: John Richard Lloyd
- Occupation: Unknown

John Richard Lloyd PSM is a former Australian public servant. He formally resigned from the Australian Public Service in August 2018, following controversy over his conduct and relationship with the conservative think tank and his former employer, the Institute of Public Affairs. Lloyd has returned to work at the Institute of Public Affairs.

== Life and career ==
Between 1992 and 1996, Lloyd was Executive Director of the Victorian Department of Business and Employment. From 1996 to 2001, Lloyd was Chief Executive of the Western Australian Department of Productivity and Labour Relations. While a Deputy Secretary in the Department of Employment and Workplace Relations from 2001 to 2004, Lloyd played a key role establishing the Royal Commission into the Building and Construction Industry in 2001, and in advising the Howard government about its response to the report of the Commission. He ensured that DEWR staff who attended protest rallies against the Commission were photographed and subject to workplace intimidation.

Between August 2004 and September 2005, Lloyd was Senior Deputy President of the Australian Industrial Relations Commission.

Lloyd was appointed the inaugural Australian Building and Construction Commissioner in September 2005, when the Office of the Australian Building and Construction Commissioner was established to monitor and promote workplace relations in the Australian building and construction industry. In the role, he came up against powerful construction unions, advocating industrial relations changes perceived by some, including the H. R. Nicholls Society, as an attack on workers' rights. In 2010, the Labor government announced it would not appoint John Lloyd for a second term, and named Leigh Johns as his successor in the role.

In 2013, the Victorian Government appointed Lloyd as red tape commissioner, with the target to reduce red tape by 25 per cent. In the role, Lloyd met with 25 different associations, and several individual businesses, before proposing 36 changes to regulations.

John Lloyd is a long time member and former director of the Work Reform and Productivity Unit at economic think-tank Institute of Public Affairs.

=== Head of the Australian Public Service Commission ===
In December 2014, Prime Minister Tony Abbott appointed Lloyd Australian Public Service Commissioner. Early on in the role, he highlighted the need for public service managers to address concerning levels of unscheduled absences, and suggested that public service middle managers were not making enough decisions or giving enough advice.

During his time as commissioner, Lloyd described himself as "IPA pin-up boy" (referencing the Institute of Public Affairs), adopting a term he said was first used by the Community and Public Sector Union.

Lloyd, was questioned by the Australian Senate in October 2017 about emails he had sent to his former colleagues at the Institute of Public Affairs. One email identified "generous provisions" in the public service enterprise agreements. Another described Labor Senator Penny Wong "taking a swipe" at two of the think tank's employees. Lloyd said that he only provided publicly available information to the think tank.

A freedom of information request for emails sent about Lloyd and the IPA was refused in May 2018 because an investigation was ongoing, which was later revealed to be an investigation by the Australian Government Merit Protection Commissioner about an email Lloyd sent after his initial Senate questioning in October 2017.

In June 2018, Lloyd said he would stand down on the 8th of August 2018 (his term was set to expire in December 2019).

Then CPSU national secretary Nadine Flood, the union which represents public servants, welcomed Lloyd’s departure, accusing Lloyd of “repeatedly and deliberately attacking and undermining the public service” and that “he has brought his office into disrepute by using a public service position to help his friends at the IPA attack workers in a Senate inquiry into bargaining.”

On the day Lloyd stood down, merit protection commissioner Linda Waugh found that Lloyd's correspondence with the IPA did breach the Australian Public Service code of conduct, although the breaches were not so severe that they would warrant sanction.

Lloyd, in reply, said that the Inquiry had damaged his reputation and he rejected its findings, citing that the Inquiry was compromised by conflict of interest.

In December 2018, John Lloyd returned to work at the Institute of Public Affairs, this time as director of workplace relations.

== Awards ==
Lloyd was awarded a Public Service Medal in June 2004 for outstanding public service in the field of workplace relations, particularly his contribution to the Royal Commission into the Building and Construction Industry.

Government offices
Preceded by Steve Sedgwick	Australian Public Service Commissioner; 2014 – 2018	Succeeded by Peter Woolcott
