= Mining and Energy Union =

Australian Labour Union

- Formation: 1915; 111 years ago
- Headquarters: Sydney, Australia
- Location: Australia
- Members: ▲25,064 (as at 31 December 2024)
- Key people: Grahame Kelly (General Secretary); Tony Maher (General President); Stephen Smyth (General Vice President)
- Affiliations: Australian Council of Trade Unions, Australian Labor Party, IndustriALL Global Union
- Website: https://meu.org.au
- Formerly called: Australian Coal and Shale Employees' Federation (1915–1990); United Mineworkers' Federation of Australia (1990–1992); Construction, Forestry, Maritime, Mining and Energy Union (Mining and Energy Division) (1992–2023)

The Mining and Energy Union (MEU) is Australia's main trade union in the coal industry, which includes mines, power stations and ports. It also covers workers in the metalliferous mining and exploration industries, as well as specific classes of workers working in the oil, gas, nuclear, chemical production and power generation industries. The MEU is affiliated with the Australian Council of Trade Unions (ACTU) and the Australian Labor Party (ALP).

The MEU was registered on 1 December 2023, following the organisation withdrawing from its amalgamation with the Construction, Forestry and Maritime Employees Union (CFMEU).

Internationally, the MEU is affiliated with IndustriALL. It has a membership of over 24,500 as of September 2023.

== History ==
The Mining and Energy Union consists of a number of unions which have amalgamated. The largest union to contribute was the Australian Coal and Shale Employees' Federation (commonly referred to as the Miners' Federation) which has a continuous history since 1915. Predecessor unions have been traced back to the mid-19th century.

Following the Second World War the Federation led the 1949 Australian coal strike, seeking a 35-hour week, a 30-shilling increase in wages, and the inclusion of long service leave as a normal condition of employment. This action resulted in the Chifley government sending the army into the mines to break the strike. While the union was unsuccessful in achieving all of their objectives, the strike did result in the institution of long service leave into the coal mine award.

In 1990, the Federation amalgamated with the Federated Mining Mechanics' Association of Australasia to form the United Mineworkers' Federation of Australia. This amalgamation gave the union coverage over mines mechanics.

In 1992 the union, then known as the United Mineworkers' Federation of Australia, merged with several other unions including the Building Workers' Industrial Union (BWIU) and the Federated Engine Drivers & Firemens' Association of Australasia (FEDFA) to form the Construction, Forestry, Mining and Energy Union (CFMEU).

Throughout their tenure in the CFMEU the union strongly opposed the introduction of individual contracts, such as the controversial Australian workplace agreements, in favour of traditional collective bargaining. This led to a number of actions opposing their introduction, such as the 1995 Weipa dispute.

The union opposed the introduction of WorkChoices, the Howard government's 2005 amendment to the Workplace Relations Act 1996. The amendment streamlined the creation of AWAs and scrapped many protections against unfair dismissal. The laws also increased restrictions on union officials to exercise their right of entry, excluded the provision for union health and safety training, and reduced coal mineworkers' long service leave entitlements.

The CFMEU would go on to merge with the Maritime Union of Australia and the Textile, Clothing and Footwear Union of Australia in 2018, forming the Construction, Forestry, Maritime, Mining and Energy Union (CFMMEU).

The MEU formally withdrew from the CFMMEU in 2023 to form the Mining and Energy Union. In a ballot ordered by the Fair Work Commission, Mining and Energy Division members voted 98% in favour of withdrawing from the CFMMEU to form an independent registered organisation.

After receiving approval from the Federal Court, the Mining and Energy Union was registered as a standalone union on 1 December 2023.

=== United Collieries ===
On 7 February 1975, all 30 workers at the Nymboida Colliery near Grafton, New South Wales were notified of their dismissal on 14 February. The owners of the mine, Nymboida Colliery Pty Ltd. declared bankruptcy, leaving the workers with little hope in receiving the approximately $70,000 of entitlements owed to them. The workers, all of whom had worked at the mine for over a decade, and 25 of them Miners' Federation members, were convinced of the mines continued viability. In a meeting on Sunday 16 February, they resolved to stage a work-in, and the following day all returned to the mine and continued to work.

On March 11 1975, at a conference in Brisbane, Nymboida Collieries Pty Ltd. officially agreed to transfer the lease of the mine to the Miners' Federation. The mine would continue to fuel its only client, the local Koolkhan Power Station until 1979, when the station was decommissioned. On 31 August 1979, Nymboida Colliery would officially close.

Under the 1970 amendment to the NSW Mining Act 1906, operators of mines due to close were eligible to apply for a replacement lease on a new mine. The NSW Government under Premier Neville Wran granted the Federation a lease in the rich Upper Hunter Coalfields adjoining the Wambo coal mine. The Federation would partner with Wambo and Italian company Agip to form United Collieries.

== Structure ==
The Mining and Energy Union consists of six districts, aligned with the historical demarcations of the predecessor unions.

- Northern Mining and NSW Energy District – Covers coal mining, processing and transport in NSW north of Sydney, including in the Hunter Valley and the Newcastle coal port. The District also covers coal-fired electricity generation throughout NSW, as well as metalliferous mining.
- Queensland District – Covers coal mining, processing and coal-fired electricity generation throughout Queensland, including in the Bowen Basin. The District also covers some workers in the Queensland metalliferous mining industry through the 1990 amalgamation with the FEDFA.
- NSW South West District – Covers coal mining in NSW south of Sydney, particularly on the South Coast and in the Illawarra region. The District also covers Western NSW, including metalliferous mines.
- Western Australian District – Covers coal mining and processing in WA, including in the Pilbara and Collie. Also covers some workers in the metalliferous mining industry, and works alongside the Australian Workers' Union in the Western Mineworkers' Alliance.
- Victorian District – Covers coal mining and processing in Victoria, as well as being the major union representing workers in the Victorian power generation industry.
- Tasmanian District – Covers coal mining and processing in Tasmania. Also covers some workers in the metalliferous industry.

== Leadership ==
- National
  - General President – Tony Maher
  - General Vice President – Stephen Smyth
  - General Secretary – Grahame Kelly
- Northern Mining and NSW Energy District
  - District President – Robin Williams
  - District Secretary – Shane Thompson
- Queensland District
  - District President – Mitch Hughes
  - District Secretary – Glenn Power
- NSW South West District
  - District President – Bob Timbs
  - District Secretary – Andy Davey
- Western Australian District
  - District President – Robert Sanford
  - District Secretary – Greg Busson
- Victorian District
  - District President – Andy Smith
  - District Secretary – Mark Richards
- Tasmanian District
  - District President – Ricky Gale

== Mineworkers' Trust ==
Following the founding of United Collieries, the union established the Mineworkers' Trust. The trust awards annual scholarships to the dependants of the union's members and also award funds to mining community organisations, welfare groups, and projects. A royalty for each tonne of coal sold under the United Collieries lease is deposited in the trust, and millions of dollars have been awarded since it was established.

== Common Cause ==
The Mining and Energy Union's newspaper, Common Cause, has been consistently published since its inception in 1921. Originally, the newspaper was circulated to mining communities and sites. It provides industry news and opinions from the union's perspective.

In 2019, following the retirement of editor Paddy Gorman, Common Cause shifted to an online newsletter model. It is directly distributed to all union members, with a print year-in-review issue published annually.
