= Australian Building and Construction Commission =

Independent government body (2016–2023)

Agency overview
- Formed: 2 December 2016
- Preceding agency: Fair Work Building and Construction
- Dissolved: 6 February 2023
- Superseding agency: Fair Work Ombudsman
- Jurisdiction: Commonwealth of Australia
- Headquarters: Melbourne
- Minister responsible: Tony Burke, Minister for Employment and Workplace Relations
- Agency executives: Nigel Hadgkiss (2016–2017); Stephen McBurney (2018–2023)
- Website: www.abcc.gov.au

The Australian Building and Construction Commission (ABCC) was an independent, statutory authority of the Australian Government, responsible for promoting understanding and enforcing workplace relations compliance in the Australian building and construction industry. The ABCC was established under the Building and Construction Industry (Improving Productivity) Act 2016 (Cth) (BCIIP Act).

The ABCC existed in a different form as the Office of the Australian Building and Construction Commissioner between 2005 and 2012, and was replaced by Fair Work Building and Construction (FWBC) between 2012 and 2016. In 2015 the Abbott government attempted to reinstate the ABCC, but the legislation failed to pass the two houses of Parliament. A further attempt to pass the legislation was unsuccessfully made by the Turnbull government in March 2016. After the two failed attempts to reintroduce the ABCC, in December 2016 Prime Minister Malcolm Turnbull called the double dissolution 2016 federal election. Following the election, the re-elected Turnbull government was successful in reinstating the ABCC with the vote of crossbench Senators of Pauline Hanson's One Nation, Nick Xenophon Team, Liberal Democrat Senator David Leyonhjelm, and Senator Derryn Hinch.

The Albanese Government transferred the responsibilities of the ABCC that it intended to continue to the Fair Work Ombudsman in November 2022, and passed legislation to formally abolish the ABCC in December 2022. The ABCC, stripped of any continuing function, was gradually wound down ahead of its official abolition on 6 February 2023.

== Jurisdiction ==
Under the BCIIP Act, the ABCC monitored and promoted compliance with a number of laws by "building industry participants", including the BCIIP Act itself, the Fair Work Act 2009 and the Code for the Tendering and Performance of Building Work 2016 (commonly known as the "Building Code"). "Building industry participants" included employees, employers, contractors, unions/employer associations and their officers, delegates & representatives, engaged in the following types of work:

- construction of buildings or structures, ports and railways
- installation of fittings
- preparatory work such as site clearances and laying of foundations
- transport of materials to building sites.

The ABCC did not have jurisdiction over domestic building work (unless part of a multi-site development involving 5 or more houses), or mining work.

== Commissioners ==
The ABCC was headed by the Australian Building and Construction Commissioner. There were only two holders of that office during ABCC's existence:

Name	Years in office	Prior & subsequent roles
Nigel Hadgkiss	2016–2017	Director of Fair Work Building and Construction (2013–2016)
Stephen McBurney	2018–2023	Assistant Commissioner (Legal) at the Office of the Australian Building and Construction Commissioner (2006–2008); Victorian Chief Examiner (2008–2018); AFL umpire (1995–2013)

The initial Commissioner was the previous Director of FWBC, Nigel Hadgkiss, who had been in that role since 21 October 2013. In October 2016, the Construction, Forestry, Maritime, Mining and Energy Union (CFMEU) filed proceedings in the Federal Court of Australia, alleging that while Director of FWBC in 2013, Hadgkiss had allowed misleading material to remain on the FWBC's website about right of entry laws, in breach of a provision of the Fair Work Act (legislation which the FWBC itself used against the CFMEU and other unions). On 13 September 2017, when the case was due to be heard at trial, Hadgkiss formally admitted to the CFMEU's allegation, and he subsequently resigned from the Commissioner's position. Hadgkiss was fined $8,500 for the breach by Justice Berna Collier, the judge remarking that his contravention was "serious" and resulted in "the dissemination by the FWBC – at his direction – of false information to the industry of which the FWBC was not only the regulator, but supposedly a trustworthy source of reliable information for industry participants."

In February 2018, the Turnbull government appointed former Victorian Chief Examiner (and former AFL umpire) Stephen McBurney as the second ABCC Commissioner.

== 2018 Senate Committee Review ==
On 1 December 2017, terms of reference for a review of the BCIIP Act were approved, and a review was conducted by Department of Employment and Workplace Relations (DEWR) between February and June 2018, and released in December 2018.

Australian Workers Union (AWU) and CFMEU both noted that the terms of reference did not satisfy the scope of terms of reference required by the Act, with the CFMEU opting not to make a submission.

The AWU submission to the Review concluded, "The BCIIP Act is a notable failure of the Australian Government and should be repealed immediately."

Where addressed, the vast majority of submissions indicated that "adequate and appropriate" independent powers had been granted to scrutinize the ABCC to safeguard the fair assessment of union and industry conduct. However, Australian Council of Trade Unions (ACTU) argued that 'real time oversight' should be allowed, and Ombudsman quarterly reports were too infrequent.

Higher penalties were set in the BCIIP Act, and despite the Act not yet allowing that higher penalties be utilized for any prosecuted cases at the time, stakeholders reported on their effects as a deterrent. The Review stated that AWU and ACTU did not provide advice on the deterrent effect, with the ACTU advising higher fines for wage theft. Industry bodies generally agreed that more time was needed to make an assessment. The Review stated that several industry submissions suggested a recent CFMEU merger may increase available funds sufficiently to diminish deterrence. Five historical cases were tabled, and the case with the highest penalty of $AUD2.4m being for infractions in July 2014 and ruled in 2017, and with the Court finding that:

"...conduct exposes a cavalier disregard for the prior penalties imposed by this Court and exposes the fact that such prior impositions have failed to act as deterrent against further unlawful industrial action."

And in 2018, the High Court, ruling upon crimes committed under the lower penalty Fair Work Act found that:

"Ultimately, if a penalty is devoid of sting or burden, it may not have much, if any, specific or general deterrent effect, and so it will be unlikely, or at least less likely, to achieve the specific and general deterrent effects that are the raison d'être of its imposition."
