= Royal Commission into the Building and Construction Industry =

Australian Royal Commission, 2001–2003

Alleged misconduct in the building and construction industry in Australia
- Also known as: Cole Royal Commission
- Outcome: Establishment of the Office of the Australian Building and Construction Commissioner (2005 – 2012)
- Inquiries: Royal Commission into the Building and Construction Industry
- Commissioner: The Honourable Justice Terence Cole RFD QC
- Inquiry period: 29 August 2001 – 27 March 2003
- Constituting instrument: Royal Commissions Act 1902 (Cth)
- Website: www.royalcombci.gov.au Archived at Trove

The Royal Commission into the Building and Construction Industry, or informally the Cole Royal Commission, was a Royal Commission established by the Australian government to inquire into and report upon alleged misconduct in the building and construction industry in Australia. The establishment of the Commission followed various unsuccessful attempts by the Federal Government to impose greater regulation upon the conduct of industrial relations in that industry.

The Royal Commission commenced on 29 August 2001 and was overseen by a sole Royal Commissioner, The Honourable Justice Terence Cole RFD QC. Justice Cole handed the commission's final report to the Governor-General on 24 February 2003; and the report was tabled in parliament on 26 and 27 March 2003.

Although the Commission found no evidence of organised criminal activity, it did articulate a case that the industry was characterised by lawlessness in the conduct of industrial relations. It recommended sweeping changes to industrial relations laws applicable to the industry. The government's attempts to implement those recommendations stalled in 2004, but were revived in 2005 after the Howard government secured control of the Senate. The Royal Commission led to the enactment of the Building and Construction Industry Improvement Act 2005 No. 113 (Cth) and the establishment of the Office of the Australian Building and Construction Commissioner (ABCC), an independent statutory authority responsible for monitoring and promoting workplace relations in the Australian building and construction industry. The ABCC was active between October 2005 and May 2012, when, following enactment of the Fair Work (Building Industry) Act 2012 (Cth), its functions were superseded by Fair Work Building and Construction, an agency of the Australian government. The agency was re-established in December 2016 as the Australian Building and Construction Commission, then shut down once more in 2023 with any continuing functions transferred to the Fair Work Ombudsman.

== Background ==
=== Federal government industry reform policy ===
In May 1997 the Federal Government, with agreement from the States, prepared a National Building Industry Code of Practice. The government supplemented the Code with Implementation Guidelines. Fundamentally, the Code and the Guidelines were an attempt to regulate the conduct of industrial relations on construction projects funded by government, through the medium of contract rather than legislation.

In July 1997 the (then) Department of Employment, Workplace Relations and Small Business formed a 'Workplace Reform Group' targeting four industries for reform: the meat processing industry, the coal mining industry, the building and construction industry and the waterfront industry. The Workplace Relations Act and the Trade Practices Act 1974 were to provide the legal tools to deliver reform. The 1998 waterfront dispute was a reflection of the focus placed on these important industries.

=== Conflict within CFMEU ===
At about the time that the Royal Commission was announced, there had been, for some time, open conflict within the Construction and General Division of the CFMEU. On the one side, led by Divisional Secretary John Sutton and NSW Divisional Branch Secretary Andrew Ferguson, forces associated with the old Building Workers' Industrial Union were seeking to maintain their control over the Division. On the other side, led by Victorian and WA Divisional Branch Secretaries, Martin Kingham and Kevin Reynolds, forces associated with the old Builders Labourers Federation were seeking to exert greater influence within the union. The battle for control over the Divisional Conference led to a range of court cases. At one point, the Divisional Secretary, John Sutton, made allegations of organised criminal activity within the union. These allegations were aired on the ABC 4Corners program, and widely cited by government ministers as justifying the calling of a royal commission.

=== Report of the Employment Advocate ===
In April 2001 the Minister for Workplace Relations, Tony Abbott, asked the Employment Advocate to provide a report "regarding behaviour in the building industry". In May 2001, the Employment Advocate provided a report which summarised statistics concerning complaints received by his office relating to alleged breaches of Freedom of Association provisions of the Workplace Relations Act; 'coercion' in agreement making, right of entry and strike pay provisions of the Act.

The report criticised other law enforcement agencies, alleging that complaints "will simply not be actioned with any priority, or at all".

This criticism mirrored certain criticisms levelled at the Victoria Police, after the 1998 waterfront dispute, to the effect that police should have been more aggressively involved in a picket-breaking role, rather than merely keeping the peace.

The report alleged that, "ill willed" people have ample opportunities to "cause major disruption to a site" by misuse of occupational health and safety procedures.

The report alleged misuse of various industry funds, including trust funds established to preserve employee entitlements such as leave pay and superannuation: "There have been allegations that senior union appointed trustees have sought to influence the investment decisions of at least one of these trusts for political and/or industrial purposes."

Most dramatically, the report alleged that union officials accepted secret commissions, engaged in bribery, and criminal corrupt conduct.

The report concluded that 'there certainly appears to be a case for a broader investigation of the industry', and that 'it would require special investigative powers to gather and elicit information beyond that normally available to a government authority'.

- Employment Advocate's report, 11 May 2001.

== Appointment of Commissioner ==
On 29 August 2001, the Governor-General issued Commonwealth Letters Patent pursuant to "the Constitution of the Commonwealth of Australia", the Royal Commissions Act 1902 (Cth) and other enabling powers" appointing The Honourable Justice Terence Cole RFD QC as the sole Commissioner and the commission's terms of reference. The commissioner was directed "...to inquire into certain matters relating to the building and construction industry..."

Subsequent to the Royal Commission, Cole was appointed as an Officer of the Order of Australia in 2005 for "service to the judiciary, particularly judicial administration, to reform of the building and construction industry, and to the community through the Australian Naval Reserve and conservation and arts organisations."

== Terms of Reference ==
The Commissioner was appointed to investigate certain matters in relation to the building and construction industry. Those matters were defined in the Letters Patent as follows:

(a) the nature, extent and effect of any unlawful or otherwise inappropriate industrial or workplace practice or conduct, including, but not limited to:

(i) any practice or conduct relating to the Workplace Relations Act 1996, occupational health and safety laws, or other laws relating to workplace relations; and

(ii) fraud, corruption, collusion or anti-competitive behaviour, coercion, violence, or inappropriate payments, receipts or benefits; and

(iii) dictating, limiting or interfering with decisions whether or not to employ or engage persons, or relating to the terms on which they be employed or engaged;

(b) the nature, extent and effect of any unlawful or otherwise inappropriate practice or conduct relating to:

(i) failure to disclose or properly account for financial transactions undertaken by employee or employer organisations or their representatives or associates; or

(ii) inappropriate management, use or operation of industry funds for training, long service leave, redundancy or superannuation;

(c) taking into account your findings in relation to the matters referred to in the preceding paragraphs and other relevant matters, any measures, including legislative and administrative changes, to improve practices or conduct in the building and construction industry or to deter unlawful or inappropriate practices or conduct in relation to that industry.

== Powers ==
The powers of Royal Commissions in Australia are set out in the enabling legislation, the Royal Commissions Act 1902 (Cth).

Royal Commissions, appointed pursuant to the Royal Commissions Act or otherwise, have powers to issue a summons to a person to appear before the Commission at a hearing to give evidence or to produce documents specified in the summons; require witnesses to take an oath or give an affirmation; and require a person to deliver documents to the Commission at a specified place and time. A person served with a summons or a notice to produce documents must comply with that requirement, or face prosecution for an offence. The penalty for conviction upon such an offence is a fine of A$1,000 or six months imprisonment. A Royal Commission may authorise the Australian Federal Police to execute search warrants.

=== Further reading ===
- Donaghue, S., Royal Commissions and Permanent Commissions of Inquiry (Butterworths, 2001) ISBN 0-409-31782-9
- Australian Law Review articles, probably cited in Donoghue

== Procedures and methods ==
At the opening of public hearings in October 2001, the Commission published a proposed 'practice note' which would govern how parties were to be granted leave to appear before it. The practice note required that any party wishing to be represented and to appear before the Commission must, as a condition of such grant of leave, provide the commission with a statement setting out all matters within that person's knowledge as to the subject matter of the inquiry. Robert Richter QC (appearing on behalf of a WA official of the CFMEU) described the proposed practice notes as requiring that parties submit to a "stalinist obligation to inform"

The Commission conducted open hearings on 171 days, and private (closed) hearings on 22 days.

See generally

- Volume 2 of the Final Report
- Practice Notes

== Criticism ==
- ACTU Submission to Senate inquiry
- David McElrea, Cole Royal Commission: the case for bias
- CFMEU Construction & General Division submission to Senate inquiry
- Jim Marr, First the Verdict: The real story of the Building Industry Royal Commission (Pluto Press, 2003) ISBN 1-86403-240-5

== Legal challenges ==
There were two legal proceedings brought against the Cole Commission during 2002. The first, brought in the name of Martin Kingham and others, was conducted on behalf of the Victorian Building Unions Divisional Branch of the Construction and General Division of the CFMEU. The second, brought in the name of Andrew Ferguson and others, was conducted on behalf of the NSW Divisional Branch of the Construction and General Division of the CFMEU. Neither of these challenges were successful.

=== Kingham v Cole ===
The applicants sought administrative law relief to prevent the Commissioner conducting the Royal Commission in accordance with the provisions of pars 12 to 15 of the commission's Practice Note 2. His decision to do so was challenged under ss 5 and 6 of the Administrative Decisions (Judicial Review) Act 1977 (Cth).

The Practice note sought to impose conditions on a person's right to cross-examine witnesses appearing before the Royal Commission. Justice Heely summarised the applicant's argument this way:

Senior counsel for the applicant attacked the validity of par 12 of the Practice Note on two grounds. First it was put that at common law Royal Commissions have no coercive powers: McGuinness v Attorney-General for Victoria (1940) 63 CLR 73 at 98-99, Herald & Weekly Times Limited v Woodward [1995] 1 VR 156 at 159. Any coercive powers must be found in the relevant statute under which the Royal Commission is established. Nothing in the Act compels the provision of a witness statement or its adoption in the witness box as prescribed in the Practice Note. It is impermissible to require, as a condition precedent to the exercise of the right to cross-examine, the performance of an obligation which is beyond the power of the Commissioner to impose. Paragraph 12 of the Practice Note is an attempt by the Commissioner to do indirectly what he cannot do directly: Wragg v New South Wales (1953) 88 CLR 353 at 387-8, Caltex Oil (Australia) Pty Ltd v Best (1990) 170 CLR 516 at 522. Further, it was said that the Commissioner did not have an unfettered discretion to grant or refuse leave to cross-examine. Secondly, it was put that the rules of natural justice may in some circumstances include the right to cross-examine a witness giving evidence adverse to a person affected. Paragraph 12 of the Practice Note was in absolute terms and applicable to all cross-examination, including cross-examination which was an exercise of rights conferred by the rules of natural justice.

These arguments were rejected:

Of course, if in the exercise of his discretion under s 6FA the Commissioner imposed a condition that had no reasonable connection with his function under the Act or the Letters Patent, that would not be a valid exercise of power. To take an extreme example, a direction that leave to cross-examine would not be granted unless an applicant made a donation to a political party would be plainly invalid. But par 12 on its face seems rationally and reasonably related to the efficient performance of the obligations of the Commissioner. Paragraph 12 is a means of ascertaining whether or not an applicant has demonstrated a sufficient interest in challenging the evidence of a particular witness. Further, a statement under par 12 will alert the Commissioner and all others concerned as to the true extent of factual disputes and thus promote the efficient resolution of those disputes. In a large and complex administrative enquiry where there is no equivalent to the pleadings and particulars used in civil litigation, the par 12 procedure has an obvious utility.

Further, I am not persuaded that par 12 creates unfairness in the broad sense which the law relating to natural justice postulates.

The applicants filed an appeal to the Full Court of the Federal Court of Australia, but this appeal was abandoned shortly afterwards.

- Kingham v Cole [2002] FCA 45 (1 February 2002)

=== Ferguson v Cole ===
On 29 August 2002 the applicants made an application to the Commissioner that he disqualify himself from, in effect, making findings of fact or recommendations in relation to New South Wales which may have an adverse impact on the applicants. On 6 September 2002 the Commissioner published reasons for his decision to dismiss the application made to him.

In this proceeding the applicants claimed that the Commissioner has shown actual bias towards them or, alternatively, by his conduct has given rise to a reasonable apprehension that he is biased towards them. They also asserted that they have been denied procedural fairness by reason of the process of inquiry adopted by the Royal Commission.

The Court dismissed the application. The Court rejected the contention that the Commissioner by the First Report made findings which directly and adversely affected the interests of the applicants. The Court also rejected the contention that the First Report shows that the Commissioner was, or could reasonably be apprehended to be, so committed to conclusions which he had already formed that he would be incapable of altering those conclusions.

- Ferguson v Cole [2002] FCA 1411 (20 November 2002)

== Reports ==
An Interim Building Industry Taskforce Report was delivered on 15 August 2002; and a Building Industry Taskforce Report delivered. The Commissioner presented his final report to the Governor-General on 24 February 2003; and the report was tabled in Parliament on 26 and 27 March 2003.

== Outcomes ==
The Government responded to the 212 recommendations of the Royal Commission; allocated more than $136 million in the 2004-05 Federal Budget; and appointed Colin Thatcher as a member of the Australian Industrial Relations Commission.

On 2 April 2003, Federal Cabinet decided to extend the operation of the Building Industry Task Force, pending the establishment of the proposed Australian Building and Construction Commission (ABCC). Cabinet also supported separate legislation to regulate the construction industry. On 25 March 2004, the Minister announced that the taskforce would become a permanent body, and would 'continue to operate until the Building and Construction Industry Improvement Bill is passed by this Parliament', and the ABCC established.

=== Prosecutions ===
Nil.

=== Legislation ===
The Building and Construction Industry Improvement Bill 2003 was tabled in Parliament; with an Explanatory Memorandum circulated by Minister. The Minister delivered his Second Reading Speech on 6 November 2003. In 2004, the Parliamentary Library published an analysis of the Bill's history. In October 2003 the Senate referred the Bill to the Employment, Workplace Relations and Education References Committee for inquiry and report. The committee received submissions, conducted hearings, and tabled its Report on 21 June 2004. The committee, by a majority composed of Senators from the Democrats and Labor, recommended that the Senate oppose the government's legislation. Government senators on the committee, in minority, recommended that the legislation be passed. Passage of the Bill stalled.

The Coalition government was returned at the 2004 election and secured control of the Senate with effect from July 2005. On 4 November 2004, the Minister for Workplace Relations Kevin Andrews announced that the legislation would be reintroduced into the new Parliament. The revised 2005 Bill passed both houses and was enacted, with Assent given to the Building and Construction Industry Improvement Act 2005 No. 113 (Cth) on 12 September 2005.

=== Regulator established ===
The Act enabled the establishment of an independent statutory authority, the Office of the Australian Building and Construction Commissioner (ABCC). The role of the ABCC was to monitor and promote appropriate standards of conduct throughout the building and construction industry. The ABCC operated between 2005 and 2012.

== Cost ==
The commission's own estimate of its expenditures, as at the date of publishing its report, was that it had spent approximately A$60 million. This figure makes this Royal Commission one of the most expensive in Australia's history.

== External links and sources ==
- BCI RC Website
- Building Industry Royal Commission: Background, Findings and Recommendations (Australian Parliament, Department of the Parliamentary Library, Current Issues Brief No.30 2002-2003)
- Marr, Jim, First the Verdict: The real story of the Building Industry Royal Commission (Pluto Press, 2003) ISBN 1-86403-240-5
