= TJ Ryan Foundation =

Australian think tank

TJ RYAN FOUNDATION
- Type: Public policy think tank
- Founded: 27 February 2014
- Key people: Roger Scott (executive director); Paul Boreham (deputy executive director); Ann Scott (research coordinator); John Ford (secretary); Ron Monaghan (treasurer)
- Website: www.tjryanfoundation.org.au

The T.J. Ryan Foundation is a progressive Australian think tank with a specific focus on public policy in the state of Queensland. The idea of the T.J. Ryan Foundation was initially announced by Queensland Labor leader Annastacia Palaszczuk on 4 May 2012. In May 2013, emeritus Professor Roger Scott was appointed inaugural executive director of the T.J. Ryan Foundation Board, together with the initial board members.

The T.J. Ryan Foundation was launched on 27 February 2014 at the Gibson Room of the Queensland University of Technology QUT's Gardens Point Campus. The keynote address 'Nepotism, patronage and the public trust' was delivered by Queensland Integrity Commissioner David Solomon.

The Foundation is named in honour of T. J. Ryan, Labor Premier of Queensland from 1915 to 1919.

== Purpose and function ==
The think tank functions as a public policy research institute, networking forum and online publishing platform. The main purpose of the organisation is to inform Queensland public policy by linking policymakers with TJ Ryan Foundation researchers. The Board and Research Associates all work pro-bono (unpaid). The board members are predominantly senior university academics, drawn from the University of Queensland, Griffith University, James Cook University and the Queensland University of Technology. In addition to the Board, Research Associates (also mostly university academics) and policy experts have been invited to join the organisation to provide a source of expertise for policymakers, and contribute to the website.

The stated aims of the Foundation are to:

- stimulate debate on issues in Queensland public administration, including effective resource allocation, service delivery, governance and accountability;
- review policy directions of current and past State governments on economic, social and cultural issues, and to analyse options for future decision-makers; and
- assist policy-makers inside and outside government in developing progressive evidence-based policy.

Despite seed funding being provided by the Queensland Labor Party (ALP) and the Queensland Council of Unions (QCU), the goal of the TJ Ryan Institute is to be a politically independent source of policy analysis and commentary and in the words of Executive Director Professor Roger Scott, to "reach beyond the ideological confines of the ALP".

Other left-leaning or progressive think tanks commenting on public policy in Australia include The Australia Institute, the ALP's official think tank the Chifley Research Centre, the socialist Fabian Society, the Evatt Foundation, the Grattan Institute and the centre-left Per Capita. Avowedly non-partisan think tanks include Centre for Policy Development and the Committee for Economic Development of Australia. Conservative or right-leaning think tanks include the libertarian Centre for Independent Studies, the Menzies Research Centre, the H. R. Nicholls Society and the Institute of Public Affairs

== Foundation board ==
- Roger Scott (executive director), emeritus professor, University of Queensland
- Paul Boreham (deputy executive director), emeritus professor, University of Queensland
- John Battams (Queensland Council of Unions president)
- Tom Cochrane, emeritus professor, Queensland University of Technology
- Robert Lingard, professorial research fellow, University of Queensland
- Paul Mazerolle, pro vice chancellor, Griffith University
- Jacki O'Mara, graduate student, Griffith University
- John Quiggin professor, ARC Laureate, Fellow University of Queensland
- Linda Rosenman, professor of social work, University of Queensland
- Mary Sheehan, adjunct professor, Queensland University of Technology
- Linda Shields, professor of nursing, Charles Sturt University
- Gillian Whitehouse, professor in political science, University of Queensland

== See also ==
T. J. Ryan
