= BurnieBoard =

Fromer hardboard brand

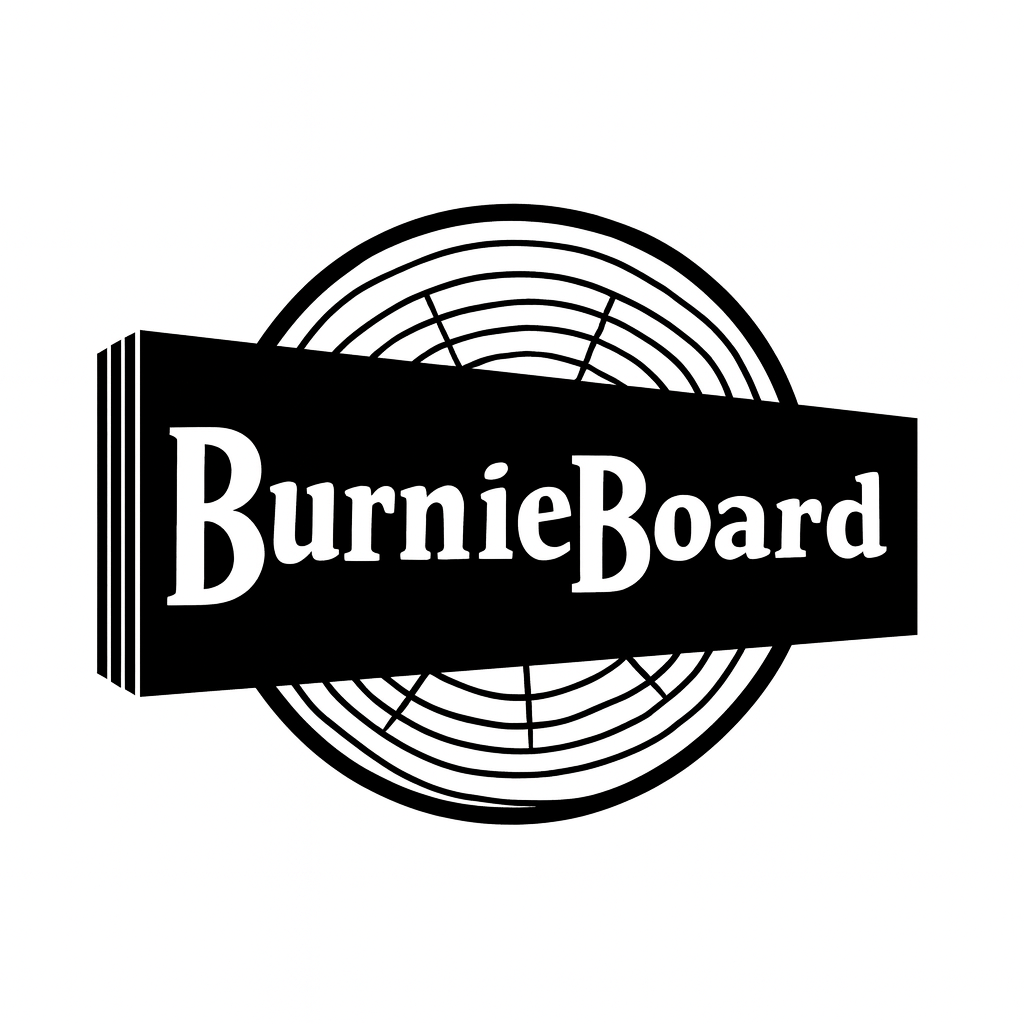
- BurnieBoard logo, c. 1950s
- Type: Subsidiary
- Industry: Hardboard manufacturing
- Founded: 1951
- Founder: Associated Pulp and Paper Mills
- Defunct: mid-1970s
- Fate: Acquired by CSR Limited; operations merged into CSR Wood Panels
- Successor: CSR Wood Panels (later Australian Hardboards Limited)
- Headquarters: Burnie, Tasmania, Australia
- Area served: Australia, New Zealand, United States
- Products: Hardboard, melamine panels, decorative wall linings
- Parent: Associated Pulp and Paper Mills

BurnieBoard was an Australian brand of hardboard manufactured by Burnie Board and Timber in Burnie, Tasmania. A subsidiary of the Associated Pulp and Paper Mills (APPM), it formed part of the company's integrated timber, pulp and paper operations. Produced from the early 1950s to the 1970s, BurnieBoard was marketed nationally and exported, primarily to New Zealand and the United States, for use in construction, furniture, and manufacturing.

The company would eventually combine with its mainland competitors, Masonite and Timbrock, becoming CSR Wood Panels in 1967, and from 1999 operated under the name Australian Hardboards Limited until its closure in December 2010.

== History ==
Plans for a hardboard manufacturing plant in Burnie were first considered by the Associated Pulp and Paper Mills (APPM) group in the mid-1940s. Design work began in 1947, and construction commenced the following year, involving imported machinery from Sweden, Germany, Britain, and the United States. The mill was officially opened on 21 September 1951 by the Premier of Tasmania Robert Cosgrove, who described the venture as “a new industry with an invested capital of £750,000 using waste material.”

Located on the slopes of Montello overlooking Emu Bay, the Burnie Hardboard Mill was operated by Paper Makers Pty Ltd, a subsidiary of APPM. It was designed and built to Swedish specifications, incorporating many modern architectural and industrial features new to Australia at the time. The plant began operations in June 1951 and produced nearly half a million square feet of hardboard per week using a process based on Swedish methods.

The production method involved chipping and defibrating eucalypt and myrtle timber into pulp under steam pressure, then forming it into wet laps and compressing them in a 4,000 t (4,400 tons) steam-heated press to a finished thickness of 3/16 in (4.8 mm). From wood to finished board, the entire process took under ten hours and required only a small shift crew operating continuously from midnight Sunday to midday Saturday.

By the mid-1950s, BurnieBoard was being produced at scale, supplying both Tasmanian and mainland markets. Nominal productive capacity at the time was 22 million square feet (approximately 2,000,000 m^{2} (22,000,000 sq ft)) per year, with provision for future expansion. The Burnie site included a large sawmill capable of processing 140,000 board foot (330 m^{3}) of timber per shift, providing kiln-dried timber and wood chips for BurnieBoard and pulp and paper production. APPM also managed surrounding forests for regeneration, fire protection, and experimental afforestation using pine species.

Entrance to the Burnie Board & Timber Pty Ltd Information Centre in Brisbane, c. 1958, part of the company's interstate showroom network.

By the early 1960s, BurnieBoard accounted for a growing share of APPM's output, rising from about 15.2 per cent of total product sales in 1961 to 20.1 per cent in 1965. To support national distribution, the company established Burnie Board and Timber Pty Ltd offices in Melbourne, Sydney, Brisbane, Adelaide, Launceston, and Townsville.

In 1965, Burnie Board and Timber joined with competitor Masonite to establish the Australian Hardboard Export Co. Pty Ltd. The venture was formed to coordinate export sales and distribution of Australian-made hardboard, aiming to improve reliability and continuity of supply to overseas markets.

By 1970, the Australian Trade Commission reported that BurnieBoard was in high demand among Californian cabinet makers. J. Millikan, vice-president of the Vance Lumber Company of Los Angeles, stated that Australian hardboard made by Burnie Board and Timber Pty Ltd “looked like its American counterpart” but was “of better quality.”

According to the Department of Trade and Industry, the initiative was supported by the creation of a "Hardboard Industry Export Council" to research and promote export markets. At the time, the annual value of Australian hardboard exports exceeded £707,000 and was projected to reach £1 million in 1964–65. Trade Minister John McEwen publicly endorsed the partnership, describing it as “a welcome step forward in Australia's export promotion drive,” and suggested it could serve as a model for other Australian industries. The original Burnie hardboard mill closed in 1983.

=== Bundamba factory ===
A second manufacturing plant was established at Bundamba in Ipswich, Queensland, where it produced hardboard panels and structural I-beams. Opened in 1957 and rebranded as the Burnie Board Pty Ltd Mill in 1958, it became APPM's only expansion of hardboard production on the Australian mainland. The plant became part of CSR Limited in 1967 following the merger that created CSR Wood Panels, and later traded as Australian Hardboards Limited from 1999 until its closure in December 2010.

== Manufacture and properties ==
BurnieBoard was produced from timber unsuitable for sawmilling or structural use, providing a means of using smaller or lower-grade wood. It was made in a variety of surface finishes and treatments, including glazed melamine coatings, oil tempering for external use, and perforation for display or acoustic purposes.

Its strength, rigidity, and relative light weight made it suitable for applications ranging from furniture and joinery to interior wall lining. Like other engineered wood products of its era, it required protection from prolonged moisture exposure.

By 1961, Burnie Board and Timber marketed several varieties of BurnieBoard, reflecting different surface finishes, treatments and uses.

Product range
Product name	Description	Typical applications
Standard BurnieBoard	For interior use; includes walls, ceilings, panelling, doors, furniture, built-ins, and flooring underlays. Termite-proofed variants were also available.	Wall linings, ceilings, doors, furniture, and floor underlays
Oil-Tempered BurnieBoard	Strengthened and treated to increase density and resistance to moisture; suitable for interior and exterior use.	Verandah walls, carports, roof decking, and formwork
Tiled BurnieBoard	Oil-tempered with a 4-inch grooved tile pattern; supplied in natural finish for painting.	Kitchens, bathrooms, and cafés
Perforated BurnieBoard	Standard BurnieBoard with 3/16 in (4.8 mm) holes at 1-inch staggered centres; available in natural or undercoated finish.	Shop fittings, exhibition stands, and acoustic linings
Marbleboard	Oil-tempered BurnieBoard with a baked melamine “marble” finish, produced in black, pink, grey, blue, green, and primrose.	Bathrooms, kitchens, laundries, feature walls, and bar fronts
Colortile	Oil-tempered Tiled BurnieBoard with a baked melamine finish in multiple decorative colours.	Bathroom and kitchen surfaces, decorative panels
Colorboard	Smooth, oil-tempered BurnieBoard with a baked melamine finish in various colours.	Wall linings and cabinetry

=== Installation and applications ===
BurnieBoard was typically fixed to timber framing or battens using nails, adhesives, or a combination of both. Manufacturer guidance recommended close nailing (generally 3 in (76 mm) to 4 in (100 mm) centres along sheet edges) and the use of cadmium-plated or galvanised brads or panel pins. Joints were often sealed with proprietary compounds or glue mixtures to match the surface finish. Sheets were to be sawn face-up to avoid surface scratches, with edges smoothed using a plane or sandpaper.

Adhesive fixing methods included animal glues, casein cements, synthetic resins and rubber-based adhesives, depending on the application. Casein and synthetic resin types were preferred for damp environments, while rubber-based adhesives were used for bonding to plaster or masonry. Manufacturer instructions emphasised maintaining proper temperature and clamping during curing.

BurnieBoard could be bent to form curves using cold or moist methods, with minimum radii depending on thickness. For example, a 1/8 in (3.2 mm) sheet could be bent to a radius of about 10 in (250 mm) when dry, or 3 in (76 mm) when hot and moist. The company advised sealing board edges when used in humid environments, particularly for melamine-finished products such as Colortile, Colorboard and Marbleboard.

== Advertising ==
BurnieBoard was promoted widely across Australia through trade magazines, newsprint advertising and cinema advertising from the mid-1950s to the 1960s. Advertisements appeared in publications such as Architecture and Arts and the Royal Australian Institute of Architects Year Book, showcasing new finishes, colours, and installation techniques aimed at architects, builders, and home renovators.

Print advertisements typically featured illustrations highlighting BurnieBoard's decorative applications, such as home interiors, kitchens, and outdoor projects. Slogans including “builds anything – practically” and “makes a 4’6” width as well as a 4’ width” emphasised its versatility, ease of use, and availability in various sheet sizes. These ads often included detailed postal coupons for project sheets and catalogues.

BurnieBoard also used cinema advertising to promote its products nationally. A short promotional film, accompanied by an original jingle composed by Australian composer George Dreyfus, was screened through the Val Morgan network during the 1960s.

== See also ==
- Associated Pulp and Paper Mills
- Burnie, Tasmania
- Hardboard
- Masonite
- Economy of Tasmania
