= Australian Coal and Shale Employees' Federation =

Australian mining workers trade union

The Australian Coal and Shale Employees' Federation (often known as the Miners' Federation of Australia) was an Australian trade union representing workers in the coal mining industry from 1913 to 1990.

It was first federally registered in 1913 as the Australasian Coal Miners' Association and changed its name to the Australasian Coal and Shale Employees' Federation in 1916. It "traces its descent in an unbroken line" through the Amalgamated Miners' Association of Australasia, itself formed in 1884, by the amalgamation of other unions, including New South Wales coal miners, with the Amalgamated Miner's Association of Victoria, formed in 1874.

In 1919, it joined the short-lived One Big Union, the Workers' Industrial Union of Australia, as its Mining Department, amending its constitution but retaining its separate industrial registration; the WIUA had ceased to exist by 1921.

By the 1930s, the union was reported to be controlled by the Communist Party of Australia. In 1949, the union headed the 1949 Australian coal strike, which resulted in the Australian Labor Party government of Ben Chifley using the army to break the strike.

It amalgamated with the Federated Mining Mechanics' Association of Australasia to form the United Mineworkers' Federation of Australia in 1990, which after two further amalgamations formed the Construction Forestry and Mining Employees' Union in 1992. This later became the Construction, Forestry, Maritime, Mining and Energy Union; however in 2023 the CFMEU's Mining and Energy Division separated as the Mining and Energy Union.
