= Construction, Forestry and Maritime Employees Union =

Australian trade union

CFMEU
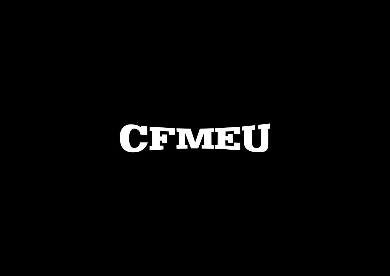
- Logo of the CFMEU
- Founded: 1992
- Headquarters: Melbourne, Victoria
- Location: Australia
- Members: ▲132,225 (as at 31 December 2024)
- National President: Paddy Crumlin
- Key people: Jason Campbell (National Vice President); Zach Smith (C&G National Divisional Secretary)
- Website: www.cfmeu.org.au

The CFMEU (formerly known as the Construction, Forestry and Maritime Employees Union) is Australia's largest trade union in the construction and maritime sectors.

The CFMEU has offices in all capital cities in Australia and in many major regional centres with the national office of the union being in Melbourne. Before the 2018 merger, the CFMEU had an estimated 120,000 members and employed around 400 full-time staff and officials.

In March 2018, a two-year long process ended resulting in a merger between the old CFMEU, the Maritime Union of Australia and the Textile, Clothing and Footwear Union of Australia. The new CFMEU had a membership of approximately 144,000, 1% of the Australian workforce, with combined assets of $310 million and annual revenue of approximately $146 million.

In July 2024, The Age, The Sydney Morning Herald, 60 Minutes and the Australian Financial Review published allegations of corruption within the Construction Division of the CFMEU's Victorian Branch. After the allegations were made, the CFMEU's Victorian Branch was placed under independent administration, the ACTU suspended its affiliation with the CFMEU's construction division in some states and the construction division's affiliation with some Labor state branches was suspended.

In August 2024, the government passed legislation which allowed Attorney-General Mark Dreyfus to place all of the CFMEU's construction and general divisions under administration. Around 270 officials were told to vacate their offices.

In April 2025, it was reported that members of the Manufacturing Division had voted overwhelmingly to disaffiliate from the CFMEU and establish a new independent union; the Timber, Furnishing and Textiles Union (TFTU). This was widely seen as an attempt to distance workers in the forestry, clothing and footwear industries from the Construction and General Division of the CFMEU. The TFTU was registered as a separate organisation under the Fair Work Commission on 17 April 2026.

== Divisions ==
The CFMEU is structured into three divisions, each operating largely autonomously:

- Construction & General division (C&G)
- Manufacturing division
- Maritime Union of Australia division (MUA)

Each division has its own discrete set of rules. Members of divisions are also divided into either districts or branches. Elections for office positions within the organisation, for which the term of office is four years, are predominantly conducted by the AEC. The supreme governing body is the National Conference, which consists of members of each divisional executive. There is also a national executive, National Executive Committee, Divisional Conferences and Divisional Executives.

== Construction and General Division ==
=== History ===
The Construction and General Division was formed in the early 1990s with the creation of the national CFMEU. The creation of a single building union had been a policy objective of various building unions for decades with records showing the Queensland Branch of the Operative Painters and Decorators Union (OPDU) carried resolutions calling for a single industry union to be created as early as the 1920s. The rationale behind this policy position was the view that members would be better represented by a larger industry-based union rather than the traditional craft unions.

The largest amalgamating union, the Building Workers' Industrial Union (BWIU) was itself the result of numerous amalgamations over several decades between 1946 and 1992. The coverage of the BWIU included numerous craft unions representing building tradespeople including bricklayers, carpenters, plasterers, tilers, stonemasons and various skilled non-trades construction workers. In the late 1980s the BWIU increased its coverage to include other construction workers such as steel fixers, concreters, construction labourers and trades assistants following the de-registration of the Builders Labourers Federation (BLF).

The division also has members working off-site in manufacturing workplaces such as shopfitting workshops, joinery shops and other establishments involved in the pre-fabrication of materials used in the construction process. Members also work in brick, tile and pottery manufacturing and in Queensland, the union covers furnishing trades as there is no formal Forestry Division in the State, due to the Australian Workers' Union's historical coverage of this industry. The Queensland Branch does, however have a presence in Queensland's forestry sector with CFMEU members employed by the State Government working for the Department of Primary Industries.

With the absorption of the Federated Engine Drivers and Firemen's Association of Australasia (FEDFA) which had coverage of crane drivers, plant operators, and other construction workers, the Construction and General Division has moved closer to fulfilling the policy objective of creating a single industry union for construction workers.

=== 2024 Administration ===
In July 2024, a joint investigation by The Sydney Morning Herald, The Age, 60 Minutes, and the Australian Financial Review was released, revealing alleged corruption within the CFMEU, such as criminals and outlaw motorcycle club members being parachuted into the union. The following day, John Setka resigned as secretary of the Victorian-Tasmanian division. A police investigation was launched into the allegations, but has not laid any charges as of 2024.

Following these allegations, the Construction division of the CFMEU in some states was placed under external administration by the National Office of the C&G Division. The Victorian Branch was placed under independent administration and the ACTU suspended its affiliation with the CFMEU's construction division in some states. The Construction division of the CFMEU was also indefinitely suspended from some Labor state branches.

In August, the government passed laws to place the entire Construction division under administration, removing 290 union officials from their roles.

Tens of thousands of workers protested the laws. Former Queensland Branch Secretary Michael Ravbar launched a High Court challenge, stating that the laws were unconstitutional, as they violated union members' right to due process.

Within weeks, the Victorian administrator Grahame McCullough resigned over claims of inappropriate comments to women.

The peak union body the Australian Council of Trade Unions (ACTU) supported the legislation, resulting in some unions leaving ACTU and seeking to form an alternate peak union body. The Communications, Electrical and Plumbing Union disaffiliated from the Australian Council of Trade Unions, and the South Australian branch of the CEPU disaffiliated from the Australian Labor Party over the issue.

In April 2025, former CFMEU leaders Darren Greenfield and his son Michael Greenfield, from the NSW branch, pleaded guilty to corruption and bribery charges, after reaching a plea deal with prosecutors for accepting a total of $30,000 from a building company owner, in exchange for preferential treatment from the union. The Greenfields' lawyer, Paul McGirr, informed the Sydney Local Court on Tuesday 15 April 2025 that a resolution is underway, with negotiations on a statement of facts progressing with the Commonwealth. McGirr expressed confidence that this agreement would be finalised soon.

In May 2025, national secretary Zach Smith stepped down to focus more on the Victorian branch.

=== Potential de-registration ===
In January 2025, opposition leader Peter Dutton vowed to deregister the CFMEU if he is elected as Prime Minister.

=== Political activity ===
The CFMEU is one of the most powerful unions in the Labor Left faction of the Australian Labor Party. The Construction Division is often associated with the left faction of the Australian labour movement, but during the 2010 Federal election the CFMEU and AMWU donated a total of $60,000 to the Greens.

Each State division operates with autonomy, which results in differing services being offered to members.

The NSW Branch of the CFMEU General and Construction Division has an estimated 5,000 members and the Victorian Branch around 9,500.

In August 2010, the CFMEU donated over $1.2 million to political activist group GetUp! to pay for TV airtime for a women's rights ad-spot condemning Tony Abbott and the Liberal Party.

In the 2013 Election, the CFMEU donated $50,000 to the Greens party in the ACT.

In Western Australia the CFMEU and its constituent branches are affiliated with the Right Faction of the WA Labor Party; "Progressive Labor" alongside the AWU, SDA, TWU and related groupings.

In 2019, the construction division donated $100,000 to the 2019–20 Australian bushfire season recovery effort.

In July 2023, CFMEU announced a campaign for a super profits tax to address Australia's affordable housing crisis, with National Secretary Zach Smith telling the National Press Club in Australia that a 40 percent tax on excess profits would raise the billions of dollars to build social and affordable housing.

== Manufacturing Division (formally Forestry and Furnishing Products Division) ==

The CFMMEU Forestry and Furnishing Products Division was first registered as a federal organisation on 21 August 1907 as the Federated Sawmill, Timber-Yard and Woodworkers Employees Association of Australasia.

The union's name was changed in 1913 to the Amalgamated Timber Workers Union of Australia, and again in 1918 to the Australian Timber Workers Union.

In late 1990, a ballot was conducted by members of the Australian Timber Workers Union and the Pulp and Paper Workers Federation of Australia endorsing the amalgamation of both unions to form the Australian Timber and Allied Industries Union.

Another ballot was conducted in mid-1991 on the amalgamation between the Australian Timber and Allied Industries Union and the Building Workers Industrial Union. This endorsement supported the first stage in the development of what is now the Construction, Forestry, Mining and Energy Union. At its peak, the Forestry and Furnishing Products Division represented approximately 20,000 members nationally.

In March 2018 (after amalgamating with the TCFUA), the CFMEU Forestry and Furnishing Products Division became the CFMEU Manufacturing Division.

In October 2024, an application to demerge the manufacturing division of the CFMEU was submitted to the Fair Work Commission by division secretary Michael O'Connor. In a media statement released on 9 October 2024, O'Connor stated “There is absolutely no benefit to our members of the Manufacturing Division remaining within the CFMEU. We are a union of honest, hardworking unionists who deserve better than being associated with the CFMEU Construction Division”. In the same statement, a new name was proposed for the de-amalgamated organisation; the Timber, Furnishing and Textiles Union (TFTU).

On the 15th of April 2025, the results of the non-compulsory members' vote to disaffiliate from the CFMEU returned an overwhelming vote to disaffiliate. With a turnout of just over 50% of members, 3,553 voted in favour of disaffiliation and 324 voted against. In a statement provided by secretary Michael O'Connor, he said that "The TFTU will carry forward the proud traditions of the Manufacturing Division and its predecessor timber, furnishing trade, pulp and paper, and textile, clothing and footwear unions—while forging a bold new path for its members as a proud part of Australia’s trade union movement" The demerger was complete by late 2025/early 2026, and the TFTU was formally registered with the Fair Work Commission on 17 April 2026.

== Maritime Union of Australia Division ==
The Maritime Union of Australia Division consists of the amalgamated Maritime Union of Australia (MUA). As of 2017, the division represented 16,000 workers associated with Australian ports.

=== History ===
In September 2019, the MUA division announced that it would go on strike during the Global Climate Strike on September 20, being "the first known instance of workers taking industrial action to attend the rallies".

=== Political activity ===
In the 2018 Victorian Election, the Maritime Union of Australia Division donated an unknown amount to the Victorian Socialists campaign.

== History ==
=== Amalgamations ===
The federal division of the Federated Saw Mill, Timber Yard and General Wood Workers Employees' Association changed its name to the Amalgamated Timber Workers' Union of Australia. The former union had been registered federally in 1907 and had registered branches in Victoria, Adelaide, New South Wales, Western Australia and Tasmania. Although the organisation was deregistered in 1918 its members formed a new union, the Australian Timber Workers' Union, the same year. The new union extended coverage to workers in box and case factories, saw makers' shops, joiners' workshops, carpenters, implement workers and wood-working machinists. In 1940 the union filed an application and succeeded in extending its coverage to most workers employed in the timber and wood industry including cabinet makers and furniture factories. In 1991 it amalgamated with the Pulp & Paper Workers' Federation of Australia to form the Australian Timber & Allied Industries Union. Later in the year amalgamation with the Building Workers' Industrial Union of Australia created the ATAIU & BWIU Amalgamated Union. Further amalgamations eventually saw this organisation become part of the Construction Forestry Mining & Energy Union in 1993.

In late 2015, the Maritime Union of Australia (MUA) and CFMEU entered into merger talks to create 'Australia's most powerful union'.

On 29 February 2016 at the MUA national conference, delegates voted unanimously in favour of negotiations for a merger with the CFMEU. In August 2017, the Turnbull government introduced tough new laws targeting the CFMEU, with broad powers to deregister unions, disqualify officials and block unions from merging if they repeatedly breach industrial laws. The proposed law failed to pass the Senate. The Fair Work Commission approved the merger in March 2018 of the CFMEU, MUA and the Textile, Clothing and Footwear Union of Australia (TCFUA). The merger had been opposed by business groups, including Master Builders Australia, and by the federal government. In November 2018, the Australian Mines and Metals Association appealed to the Federal Court of Australia against the merger. The appeal was dismissed in December.

=== Building and construction industry regulation ===
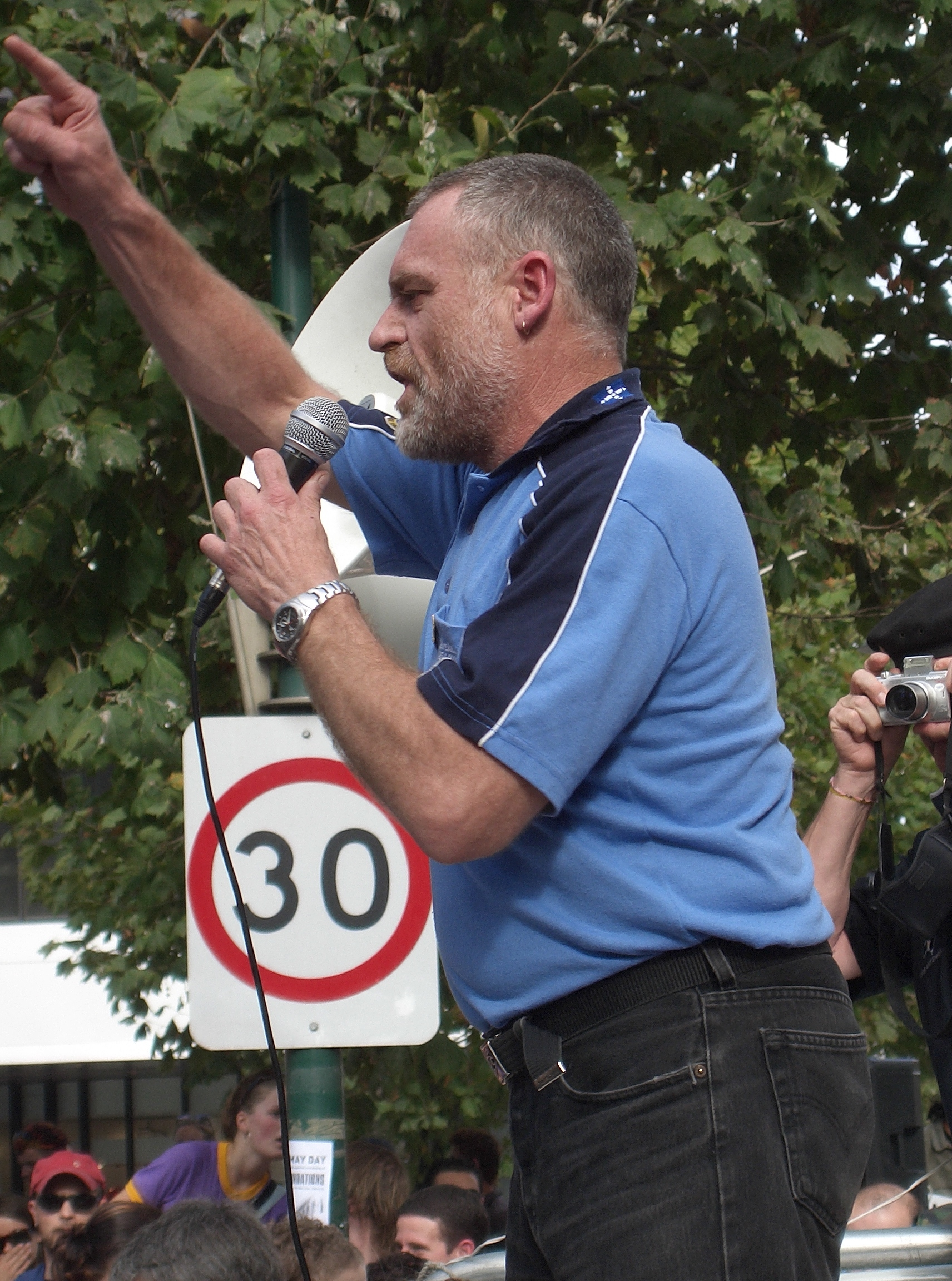
Martin Kingham, Former Victorian secretary of the CFMEU speaking at a rally to oppose the Howard government's then-proposed VSU legislation.

In 2001, the Howard government set up the Royal Commission into the Building and Construction Industry (commonly known as the Cole Royal Commission). The commission and its findings were largely condemned by the Labor Party and the Greens which argued that the terms of reference were too narrow. The CFMEU asserted that the purpose of the commission was a "witch-hunt" to reduce the power of the CFMEU rather than to investigate crime. The General and Construction Division of the union stopped some corruption within the union. Justice Cole found 392 cases of unlawful conduct; 98 cases were passed on to prosecution authorities by the Commonwealth Attorney-General, of which 26 were considered breaches of criminal law.

As a result of the commission's findings the Howard government established the Office of the Australian Building and Construction Commissioner (commonly known as the ABCC) in 2005. It had a wide range of powers, including compelling testimony under oath, with penalties of up to $22,000 for individuals and $110,000 for corporations and unions apply for breaches of the Building and Construction Industry Improvement Act 2005. The ABCC was abolished in 2012 by the Gillard government and was replaced by the Fair Work Building and Construction. In 2015 the Abbott government attempted to reinstate the ABCC, but the legislation failed to pass the two houses of Parliament. A further attempt to pass the legislation was unsuccessfully made by the Turnbull government in March 2016. After the two failed attempts to reintroduce the ABCC, in December 2016 Prime Minister Malcolm Turnbull called the double dissolution 2016 federal election. Following the election, the reelected Turnbull government was successful in reinstating the ABCC with the vote of Pauline Hanson's One Nation, the Nick Xenophon Team and Senator Derryn Hinch.

Under WorkChoices, situations where industrial action could take place were reduced. The CFMEU and workers had to prove a workplace was unsafe to put a stop to work on a site which has not happened to date.

=== Construction, Forestry, Mining and Energy Union v BHP Coal Pty Ltd ===
During 2011 and 2012, BHP Coal and its employees were negotiating about a new enterprise agreement to apply to BHP Coal's operations at various mines, including the Saraji coal mine. For the purpose of supporting or advancing their claims, employees of BHP Coal took protected industrial action in the form of work stoppages and overtime bans. There was a seven-day work stoppage between 15 and 22 February 2012. During this stoppage, members of the CFMEU who were employed at the Saraji mine, including Henk Doevendans, participated in protests beside the road leading into the mine property. Standing behind barriers BHP Coal had erected at the side of the road, the protesters held up signs which the CFMEU had provided and waved the signs at those who were driving into the mine. The signs were directly or indirectly critical of BHP Coal and of those who were driving into the mine. On four occasions over three days, Doevendans held up a sign that read: "No principles Scabs No guts." Some employees of BHP Coal complained to management about the scabs sign. Following some interactions with management, Doevendans' employment with BHP was terminated.

On appeal to the High Court of Australia, it was held that the dismissal of Doevendans was permissible under the Fair Work Act 2009.

=== Mining and Energy Union withdraws from CFMEU ===

As of 1 December 2023, the Mining and Energy Division no longer exists. It consisted of a number of unions which had amalgamated. The largest union to contribute to the formation of the division was the Australian Coal and Shale Employees' Federation (ACSEF) (often known as the Miners Federation) which had a continuous history dating back to 1915. Predecessors to the ACSEF had existed on and off since the 1850s.

Industries covered by the Mining and Energy Division included the coal industry, coal ports, the metalliferous mining industry, electric power generation, oil and gas and the small coke industry.

- The Coal Industry: The coal industry was the majority of the Mining and Energy Division's coverage. Of more than 16,500 members around 13,000 worked in the coal industry. The CFMEU was the primary union for the coal mining industry.
- Coal Ports: The union represented most workers (approximately 500) at export coal ports located along the east coast of Australia
- Metalliferous Mining: The Division covered most metalliferous miners in Broken Hill where silver, lead and zinc ores are mined. There were around 400 members at Broken Hill. Other mines are largely covered by the AWU. Through the amalgamation with the FEDFA, the division also had around 1,500 members at metalliferous mines in Western Australia, South Australia, Tasmania and Queensland.
- Oil, gas and electricity: The division had around 2,200 members employed in power stations, oil refineries and other parts of the oil and gas production chain. This division was the major union representing workers in the Victorian power generation industry.
- The Coke Industry: This industry as a stand-alone commercial industry is quite small in Australia. Most coke production is tied to iron and steel operations. There are stand-alone coke works on the South Coast of NSW (north of Wollongong) and in Bowen in Northern Queensland. The Mining and Energy Division covered the cokeworks on the south coast and the AWU covers the Bowen site. The CFMEU had approximately 50 members in the coke industry.

In June 2023, the Mining and Energy Division, led by Tony Maher, voted to withdraw from the CFMMEU. The division is now a separate organisation, the Mining and Energy Union (MEU), with the remainder of the CFMMEU changing its name to the Construction, Forestry and Maritime Employees Union.

The new Mining and Energy Union commenced on 1 December 2023.

== Leadership ==
Michael Crosby- Administrator

Matt McGowan- Assistant Administrator

SA Branch- Dan Murphy, Branch Executive Officer

Queensland Branch- Jared Abbott, Branch Executive Officer

WA Branch- Mick Buchan- Branch Executive Officer

NSW Branch- Karma Lord- Branch Executive Officer

== See also ==
- John Setka, former secretary of the Victorian-Tasmanian division of the CFMMEU
- Solidarity Park
- One Big Union (concept)
- Office of the Australian Building and Construction Commissioner (2005–2012 agency)
- Fair Work Building and Construction (2012–2016 agency)
- Australian Building and Construction Commission (2016–2023 agency)
- Royal Commission into Trade Union Governance and Corruption
