= Amalgamated Workers Union =

Trade Union in Trinidad and Tobago

AWU
- Amalgamated Workers Union
- Headquarters: 16 New Street, Port of Spain, Trinidad and Tobago
- Location: Trinidad and Tobago
- President General: Michael Prentice
- General Secretary: Cassandra Tommy Dabreo
- Affiliations: JTUM

The Amalgamated Workers Union (AWU) is a trade union in Trinidad and Tobago.

AWU was formed in 1936 and originally registered in 1938 as the Amalgamated Building and Woodworkers Union following the historic Butler-led labour rebellions of that era. It was a time before sewers when garbage was carried away by donkey carts out of the nation's sceptic tanks in the middle of the night by the bucket and barrel. More than eighty years later, while the machinery may have changed to pumps and metal trucks, The Union's core membership remains the same. Members include the sanitation support Workers of the Port of Spain Corporation; the Clerks and Cleaners in downtown malls of East Side Plaza and New City Mall; the factory Workers at the internationally recognized Bermudez Biscuit Company; the Funeral Attendants and Drivers at Belgroves Funeral Home; the Cooks and Counter-staff of local fast-food giant, Royal Castle Limited; and many others. AWU is one of the first trade unions in Trinidad and Tobago.

AWU has reformulated and expanded its Labour Relations Department to better serve all of its units as well as increasing numbers of unrepresented ("Off the Street") Workers as well as the launch of its first national weekly radio program, "Work N Progress".

"Work N Progress" was the Union's weekly radio show on i95.5fm, Wednesdays at 2:30. Created through the vision of the Union's President General Michael Prentice, the show was produced by Workers for national progress.

In 2025, the AWU negotiated a payrise for its members with the government.

== See also ==
- List of trade unions
