= Fair Work Building and Construction =

Australian government agency

Fair Work Building & Construction

Agency overview
- Formed: 1 June 2012
- Preceding agency: Office of the Australian Building and Construction Commissioner
- Dissolved: 2 December 2016
- Superseding agency: Australian Building and Construction Commission
- Jurisdiction: Australia
- Headquarters: Melbourne; Victoria, Australia
- Employees: 120+
- Agency executives: Leigh Johns, Acting Director (2012–2013); Brian Corney, Acting Director (2013); Val Gostencnik, Director (2013); Nigel Hadgkiss, Director (2013–2016)
- Parent agency: Department of Employment
- Website: fwbc.gov.au

Fair Work Building & Construction (FWBC), or more formally the Office of the Fair Work Building Industry Inspectorate was an Government of Australia agency established by the Fair Work (Building Industry) Act 2012. FWBC commenced operations on 1 June 2012, replacing its predecessor, the Office of the Australian Building and Construction Commissioner. FWBC was replaced by the Australian Building and Construction Commission on 2 December 2016. FWBC was responsible for enforcing industrial relations laws in Australia’s building and construction industry through the provision of education, assistance and advice.

FWBC aimed to ensure the rule of law applies on building sites within Australia and that building work is carried out fairly, efficiently and productively for the benefit of all building industry participants and for the benefit of the Australian economy as a whole.

The agency had offices in Sydney, Brisbane, Adelaide, Canberra, Hobart, Darwin and Perth, with its head office located in Melbourne.

The agency’s investigators visited construction sites across Australia to ensure all building industry participants were complying with federal law.

== Functions ==
FWBC was responsible for the following workplace relations matters in the building and construction industry:

=== Investigating and auditing ===
Investigating alleged contraventions of:

- the Fair Work Act 2009
- the Independent Contractors Act 2006
- Building Code 2013

=== Educating and advising ===
- Responding to enquiries for advice and assistance.
- Conducting presentations on the rights and responsibilities of building industry participants.
- Producing and distributing fact sheets on legislation, regulations and industrial relations practices.
- Publishing updates on legal findings (e.g. outcomes of court cases), operational activities, newsletters and updates on topics affecting the industry.

=== Instituting proceedings for contraventions of the Fair Work Act 2009 (FW Act) ===
If FWBC determined a contravention has occurred, the agency could commence legal action. FWBC also had the power to intervene in court proceedings—and Fair Work Commission proceedings—that involve a building industry participant or building work.
Contraventions may relate to:

- Coercion
- Industrial action
- Discrimination
- Workplace rights
- Strike pay
- Right of entry

=== Referring matters to other Commonwealth or State and Territory bodies ===
Where appropriate, the FWBC could refer matters to other Commonwealth or State and Territory bodies, including the

- Fair Work Ombudsman
- Australian Taxation Office
- State and Federal Police
- Australian Securities & Investments Commission
- Director of Public Prosecutions
- Australian Competition *Consumer Commission.

== Related links ==
- Fair Work Building & Construction
- Fair Work Ombudsman - Official website
- Fair Work Commission - Official website
