= Office of the Australian Building and Construction Commissioner =

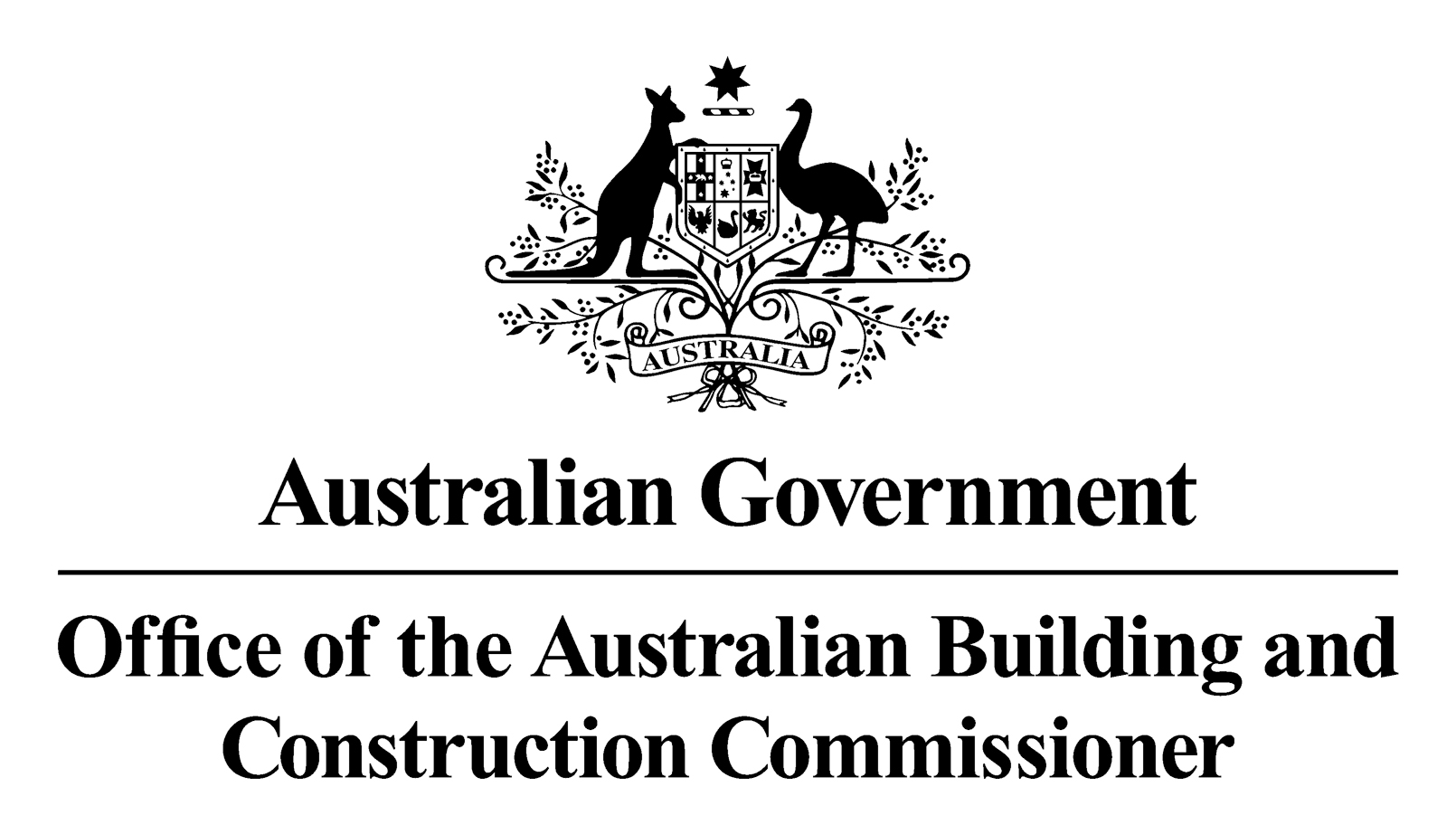

Agency overview
- Formed: 1 October 2005
- Dissolved: 31 May 2012
- Superseding agency: Fair Work Building and Construction
- Headquarters: Melbourne
- Agency executives: John Lloyd (2005–2010); Leigh Johns (2010–2012)

The Office of the Australian Building and Construction Commissioner (ABCC) (2005–2012) was an independent, statutory authority, responsible for monitoring and promoting workplace relations in the Australian building and construction industry. The ABCC provided education, investigated workplace complaints and enforced compliance with national workplace laws in the industry. The ABCC did this by:

- Providing information, education and advice on Commonwealth workplace laws;
- Investigating complaints or suspected contraventions of workplace laws; and
- Taking court action to enforce workplace laws.

The ABCC was abolished on 31 May 2012, and many of its functions were taken on by a new independent, specialist agency called Fair Work Building & Construction.

== History ==
=== Royal Commission into the Building and Construction Industry ===
The Royal Commission into the Building and Construction Industry was established in August 2001 and tabled its final report in March 2003. The Royal Commission found that the building and construction industry was characterised by a widespread disregard for the law, cataloguing over 100 types of unlawful and inappropriate conduct.

The Commission also found that existing regulatory bodies had insufficient powers and resources to enforce the law.

=== Building Industry Taskforce ===
The Building Industry Taskforce (BIT) was the predecessor to the ABCC, and was established on 1 October 2002 as an interim body prior to the establishment of the national agency envisaged by Royal Commissioner Cole.

In March 2004 the Interim Taskforce became a permanent taskforce, operating until the BCII Act created the ABCC in October 2005.

Nigel Hadgkiss was the director of the BIT from October 2002 until it was subsumed by the ABCC. On 29 September 2005 the Hon. John Lloyd PSM was appointed as the inaugural ABCC Commissioner. ABCC Commissioner Leigh Johns took up his appointment on 11 October 2010.

=== Abolition ===
On 16 February 2012, legislation to abolish the ABCC passed the House of Representatives by 71 votes to 70. The legislation passed through the Senate on 21 March, and the agency was officially abolished on 31 May 2012. On 1 June 2012, a new independent regulator, Fair Work Building & Construction, was created to take on many of the functions of the ABCC.

=== Reinstatement ===
In 2015 the Abbott government attempted to reinstate the ABCC, but the legislation failed to pass the two houses of Parliament. A further attempt to pass the legislation was unsuccessfully made by the Turnbull government in March 2016. After the two failed attempts to reintroduce the ABCC, in December 2016 Prime Minister Malcolm Turnbull called the double dissolution 2016 federal election. Following the election, the reelected Turnbull government was successful in reinstating the ABCC with the vote of Senators Pauline Hanson's One Nation, Nick Xenophon Team and Derryn Hinch.

Under WorkChoices, situations where industrial action could take place were reduced. The CFMEU and workers had to prove a workplace was unsafe in order to put a stop to work on a site which has not happened to date.

== Regulatory focus ==
=== Unlawful industrial Action ===
The ABCC could commence civil penalty proceedings against individuals and organisations who engaged in unlawful industrial action.

Industrial action by building employees includes work stoppages, bans and other restrictions on the performance of work. Industrial action by building employers includes locking out employees.

Civil penalty proceedings resulting in a fine were able to be brought against building and construction industry participants who engaged in unlawful industrial action.

=== Coercion ===
Coercion in the building and construction industry is unlawful. Coercion includes pressure to make decisions regarding the hiring of building contractors and employees, agreement making, union or industry association membership, and superannuation schemes.

=== Wages and entitlements ===
The ABCC provided free information and advice on pay, conditions, and workplace rights and obligations to building and construction industry participants. The ABCC also investigated complaints relating to the underpayments of wages, sham contracting or any other denial of entitlements for those working in the building and construction industry.

=== National Code ===
In 1997 the Australian Government put in place a National Code of Practice for the Australian building and construction industry. In order to be eligible to work on Australian Government building and construction projects businesses must be compliant with the National Code of Practice. The National Code and Guidelines encourage a culture of best practice workplace relations and the compliance to all legal obligations and ethical tendering requirements.

=== Sham contracting ===
A sham contract is where an employer deliberately disguises an employment relationship as an independent contracting arrangement, instead of engaging the worker as an employee. This may mean the worker misses out on some entitlements.

In other cases, employees are pressured to become independent contractors where they are threatened with being dismissed or are misled about the effect of changing their working arrangements.

The FW Act and IC Act protects genuine employees from sham contracting arrangements.

=== Right of entry ===
The ABCC oversaw laws regarding how and when a person could enter a building or construction worksite. Union officials wishing to enter a building or construction worksite must hold a valid federal permit and in most instances must provide at least 24 hours written notice. If the reason for entry relates to an occupational health and safety issue, the written notice period may not apply.

== Industry response ==
The building industry's response to the ABCC was varied. Industry associations such as Master Builders Association (MBA) generally voiced strong support of the ABCC, while the union movement opposed the ABCC and successfully lobbied the government to have the agency abolished.

=== Section 52 compulsory examination power ===
Section 52 of the BCII Act provided the ABCC Commissioner with the power to compel a person who had evidence relating to an investigation to answer questions, provide information and/or produce documents. People who failed to comply with a section 52 notice were able to be prosecuted by the Commonwealth Department of Public Prosecutions. The maximum penalty was six months imprisonment but, instead of or in addition to imprisonment, the court could impose a maximum $3,300 fine for breaches, and five times that for a body corporate convicted of an offence. This is provided for under subsection 4B(2) of the Crimes Act 1914.

Australia's major construction union regularly criticised the ABCC's use of the section 52 power saying, ‘the powers enable the ABCC to put construction workers in front of a secret interrogation’.

In support of the ABCC's Section 52 power MBA Victoria said:

In order to be effective in this role, the ABCC was provided strong powers to investigate alleged misconduct and breaches of the law. The ABCC needed these strong investigatory and compliance powers to break down the ‘wall of silence’, ‘culture of intimidation’ and ‘fear of speaking up’ in the industry. These powers were also provided to protect individuals who give evidence.

=== International Labour Organization ===
In 2007 the Australian Council of Trade Unions (ACTU) submitted a complaint to the International Labour Organization (ILO) on the alleged harsh measures contained in the BCII Act against construction workers and their unions in continuing deterioration of compliance with Conventions 87 and 98. The Government responded to the complaint by outlining the national conditions that led to the BCII Act, which included the Royal Commission's finding of a culture of lawlessness in the building and construction industry.

== Targeted campaigns ==
=== Sham Contracting Inquiry ===
On 19 November 2010, ABCC Commissioner Leigh Johns announced that ABCC would conduct a national inquiry into sham contracting within Australia's building and construction industry. On 22 December 2010, a call was made for written public submissions to the inquiry. A total of 21 submissions were received from various industry participants including employer representatives, subcontractors, the resources sector and academics. In March and April 2011 the ABCC held a series of roundtable events in Canberra, Sydney, Melbourne, Perth and Brisbane, to provide a forum for all industry participants to discuss the issues surrounding unethical practices and reach industry-wide solutions. The ABCC released its report on 29 November 2011, which outlined ten recommendations aimed at eliminating sham contracting within the industry. The recommendations range from looking at the legislative definitions of ‘employees’ and ‘contractors’, developing whole-of-government regulatory responses and examining how the ABCC might better conduct its core work investigating breaches of Australia's workplace laws.

=== Wages and entitlements ===
In March 2011 the ABCC took full responsibility for investigating complaints relating to wages and entitlements within the building and construction industry. Prior to this a memorandum of understanding had been in place between the ABCC and Fair Work Ombudsman (FWO) where such complaints were handled by the latter agency. ABC Commissioner Leigh Johns announced he would terminate this practice when he commenced his appointment on 11 October 2010.
