= Building Workers' Industrial Union of Australia =

Trade union in Australia

The Building Workers' Industrial Union of Australia was an Australian trade union covering workers in the construction industry.

== Amalgamated Society of Carpenters and Joiners of Australia ==
It was originally established as the Australian District of the Amalgamated Society of Carpenters and Joiners, initially forming part of the English trade union, with a carpenters' union having been active as early as the 1840s. It was first federally registered under that name in 1911. In 1922, it was renamed the Amalgamated Society of Carpenters and Joiners of Australia, when it absorbed many members from the collapsing Australian Society of Progressive Carpenters and Joiners.

== Expanded coverage ==
Discussions about merging the various building industry unions had begun by the 1930s, and in 1934, the New South Wales state carpenters' and bricklayers' unions merged as the Building Workers' Industrial Union, with approaches also being made to the plasterers', painters' and labourers' unions. In 1943, the issue of amalgamation on a broader scale emerged again. The federal Amalgamated Society of Carpenters and Joiners sought to expand its coverage to workers across the entire building industry, and changed its name to the Building Workers' Industrial Union, with a number of state-level unions merging into the union. In the same year, the New South Wales branch affiliated with the Australian Labor Party for the first time, breaking from the Carpenters' and Joiners' historical non-affiliation.

The union suffered a setback in 1944 when the amalgamation of the Queensland state Carpenters' and Joiners' with Painters' and Decorators' Union and the Queensland branch of the Builders Labourers Federation to form a Queensland state branch of the BWIU was blocked in court after a challenge from the Australian Workers' Union and other rival unions. A second attempt was made later that year to merely rename the state Carpenters' and Joiners' Union as the BWIU, as had occurred federally, but was also blocked in court; the state union also lost on appeal the next year. The New South Wales branch was headed by Communist leadership through much of World War II, and faced an ongoing dispute over their coverage on the wharves with the newer and more conservative rival Ship Joiners' Society.

== Deregistration ==
In August 1948, the union was deregistered by the Commonwealth Arbitration Court in retribution for the Victorian branch's decision to order strike action regarding a claim that had been rejected by the court. Several attempts at re-registration were refused by the Court over the next several years. A federal executive continued to operate despite the deregistration, and the various branches continued operating at state level. A conservative splinter group re-registered a union under the Amalgamated Society of Carpenters and Joiners name in 1952. The union was described by The Canberra Times in 1957 as "one of the most militant elements in the building trades' group of unions". In the late 1950s, the union supported exchanging preferences between the Labor Party and Communist Party, opposed nuclear weapons being based in Australia, and supported closer relations between Australia and the Soviet Union.

== Re-registration and amalgamation ==
The BWIU eventually won federal re-registration in September 1962. The industrial registrar noted that the union had kept their much of their membership and their identity throughout the long period of deregistration. The re-registration resulted in a renewed competition for membership with the rival Amalgamated Society of Carpenters and Joiners, which had benefited from their lengthy federal deregistration. In later years, the union clashed heavily with the Builders Labourers Federation, with the unions once described as "foremost enemies".

In 1991, the union merged with the Australian Timber and Allied Industries Union, itself a recent amalgamation of the Australian Timber Workers Union and the Pulp and Paper Workers Federation of Australia, to form the "ATAIU & BWIU Amalgamated Union". That union then merged into the Construction Forestry & Mining Employees Union in 1992, which in turn became the Construction Forestry Mining & Energy Union later that year.

Notable people associated with the union included Alfred Bennett, Pat Clancy, Peter Cook, Roger Degen, Jack Ferguson, Edward Greaves, Kate Lundy, Fred Newton, David Parker and Merv Toms.Tony Bleasdale
