= Nigel Hadgkiss =

British-born Australian police officer

Nigel Clive Hadgkiss AM APM is a British-born Australian police officer and public servant, who was the Australian Building and Construction Commissioner until resigning on 13 September 2017. He was previously an Assistant Commissioner with the Australian Federal Police and was the Director of Operations at the Wood Royal Commission into the New South Wales Police Force.

== Early life ==
Hadgkiss was born in the Midlands of England into a working-class family consisting of Ida Olive and Cyril Lesley as well as two siblings by the name of Rosalind and Paul. His father worked at the BSA Motorcycle factory in Birmingham. He was encouraged by his uncle to pursue a career in law, but gave up a university place in London to join the Royal Hong Kong Police Force. He served in Hong Kong for eight years, starting as a constable in the Tsim Sha Tsui district, and eventually investigating complex fraud in the Commercial Crime Bureau.

On a ship back to England for police training, Hadgkiss met Moira, an Adelaide-born nurse who returned with him to Hong Kong where they married. When his contract in Hong Kong expired, Hadgkiss applied to join the Australian Federal Police and the couple moved to Melbourne, Australia.

== Education ==
Hadgkiss holds Bachelor of Laws (LLB) and Masters of Commerce (MComm) degrees from the University of New South Wales.

== Career ==
Between 1994 and 1996, Hadgkiss was the director of operations at the Wood Royal Commission into the New South Wales Police. Later that year, the Australian Federal Police promoted him to Assistant Commissioner.

In 1997 Hadgkiss was invited to Toronto to appear before a Royal Commission examining the wrongful conviction of a man for first degree murder, assisting the Commissioner in formulating recommendations to improve the administration of criminal justice in Ontario. In 1998 he was invited to York University, Toronto, as a visiting fellow to Canada’s largest law school, Osgoode Hall, for their 1999 winter semester. In May 1999 he presented seminars at All Souls College, Oxford University, and at the Inner Temple Hall of the Inner Temple Inn of Court, London.

From 2000, Hadgkiss was the National Director Intelligence at the Australian Crime Commission (formerly the National Crime Authority) before serving as the Director of the Building Industry Taskforce. Hadgkiss was then appointed Deputy Commissioner of the Australian Building and Construction Commission (ABCC) where he was credited with bringing a "remarkable era of peace and productivity to the nation's building sites".

As a result of a recommendation contained within the Auditor-General’s March 2008 Report on the efficiency of the Office of the Director of Public Prosecutions (ODPP), Hadgkiss was appointed Executive Director, Office of the Director of Public Prosecutions (ODPP), NSW, following which he was the Director, Construction Code Compliance, Victorian Department of Treasury and Finance from March 2012 to October 2013, and then appointed Director of Fair Work Building & Construction on 21 October 2013.

Hadgkiss became Commissioner, ABCC following the reintroduction of the agency in December 2016. Hadgkiss handed in his resignation in September 2017 following revelations that material distributed by his organisation suggested employers could make reasonable requests to stop union officials holding meetings in workplaces, however changes to the law meant the employer no longer had that right. Liberal senator Eric Abetz accused the union of "seizing on a slip up" as a distraction from issues within the union itself, adding "That which Mr Hadgkiss is alleged to have done pales into absolute insignificance, it is literally in the parable, they are pointing out a little speck in Mr Hadgkiss's eye".

Since 1996 Hadgkiss has been a member of the RMIT University’s Business Management Course Advisory Committee, a board member of the Australian Institute of Criminology (2000), chair of the Commonwealth’s Executive Leadership Group Victoria, a board member of the industry advisory board for the Centre of Business Forensics at the University of Queensland, an adjunct professor with the University of Queensland’s Business School (2002), and chair of the audit committee of the Australian Institute of Criminology (2008).

== Honours ==
Between 1972 and 1998, Hadgkiss received 15 commendations, including two from District Court Judges, three from Supreme Court Judges, and one from a chief justice.

Hadgkiss was made a Winston Churchill Fellow in 1989, after which he spent five months in Northern Ireland, Italy, Switzerland, Germany, England, the United States of America and Canada studying Comparative Methods for Combating Organised Crime.

During his secondment to the Wood Royal Commission, Hadgkiss was awarded the Australian Police Medal (APM) for distinguished service in the 1995 Queen’s Birthday Honours List.

Hadgkiss was appointed as a Member of the Order of Australia (AM) in the Queen's Birthday Honours List for 2019. The citation reads, “For significant service to the building and construction sector, to public administration, and to law enforcement.”
