= Pulp and Paper Workers Federation of Australia =

Former Australian trade union

- Pulp and Paper Workers' Federation of Australia
- Merged into: Australian Timber and Allied Industries Union
- Founded: 1913
- Dissolved: 1991
- Headquarters: 21 O'Shannassy Street, North Melbourne
- Location: Australia
- Members: 4,000 (1987)
- Affiliations: ACTU, ALP, International Chemical Federation

The Pulp and Paper Workers Federation of Australia (PPWF) was an Australian trade union which existed between 1913 and 1991. The PPWF represented workers in the pulp and paper industry.

== History ==
The union was federally registered in 1913 as the Australian Paper Mill Employees' Union, at which time it represented workers in Victorian paper mills. A state-based Paper Mill Employees' Union had previously existed in Victoria since at least 1909. Workers manufacturing paper bags were added to the union in 1916. The union initially opposed increased duties on imported paper products, but reversed their position by the 1920s due to the impact of competition from Japanese imports. The union began operating in South Australia by the early 1940s.

The union faced difficulties in New South Wales due to the Australian Workers' Union having asserted control of paper workers in that state, and following negotiations in 1924, the union refrained from organising NSW workers until 1942. In 1943, having recruited members at the Australian Paper Manufacturers mills in Sydney, the APMEU applied for an award for NSW workers in the Commonwealth Industrial Court, alleging that the AWU had engaged in "neglect" and "indifference" towards paper workers; the court denied the claims. In 1943, the union sought sick leave for their members at APM, which was only being granted to AWU members. Two hundred APMEU members went on strike over the issue, but the Commonwealth Industrial Court rejected the claim, finding that the AWU had the exclusive right to represent workers in the paper milling industry in New South Wales. The AWU responded to the court challenge by having their own members strike in protest against the APMEU attempts to organise there; the APMEU returned to work during the AWU strike. The Amalgamated Building Trades' Federation, the Electricians' Union and the Ironworkers' Union sided with the APMEU in the dispute. In May 1943, the court restrained further workers from joining the APMEU at the APM mills, but allowed existing members to decide whether they would remain. The APMEU sought to challenge the decision in the High Court of Australia, but was unsuccessful.

In 1948, the union renamed itself the Pulp and Paper Workers Federation of Australia, at which time it had members in three states: Victoria, New South Wales, and South Australia. It made an agreement with the Printing Industries Employees Union of Australia, which represented workers in the paper industry in Tasmania, to give the union 28 days notice of any intention to enrol employees in Tasmania. The union opposed the conservative Industrial Groups and called for their disbanding as early as 1950. In 1950, the AWU attempted to have the PPWF deregistered for "intruding into AWU territory" at the Sydney APM mills. The AWU claimed that 212 workers had resigned from the AWU due to pressure from Federation organisers. The AWU also alleged that the PPWF leadership were Communists, which the PPWF leadership denied. The deregistration application was refused. In 1953, the union attempted to recruit workers in Tasmania, sparking a furious response from the PIEUA. The Hobart Trades Hall Council, in support of the PIEUA, labelled the move "industrial blackmail, white-anting and bodysnatching" and suggested that the Australian Council of Trade Unions should cancel the PPWF's affiliation. The ACTU, in turn, ordered the PPWF not to interfere with the PIEUA.

By the 1970s the PPWF had established 100% financial membership, with the industry operating as a "closed shop". It had local branches in Melbourne, Sydney, Maryvale, Millicent, Burnie, Broadford, Ballarat, Nowra and Port Huon. The union maintained a mortality fund for its members, as well as a superannuation fund and disability insurance. The Pulp and Paper Workers Superannuation Fund, established in 1974, was the first industry super fund created in Australia - 15 years before superannuation became generally available to Australian workers.

The union amalgamated with the Australian Timber Workers Union to form the short-lived Australian Timber and Allied Industries Union on 1 January 1991. The amalgamated union then took part in a further series of amalgamations which would result in the formation of the Construction, Forestry, Mining and Energy Union by the end of 1992.
