= George Galloway =

British politician, broadcaster, and writer (born 1954)

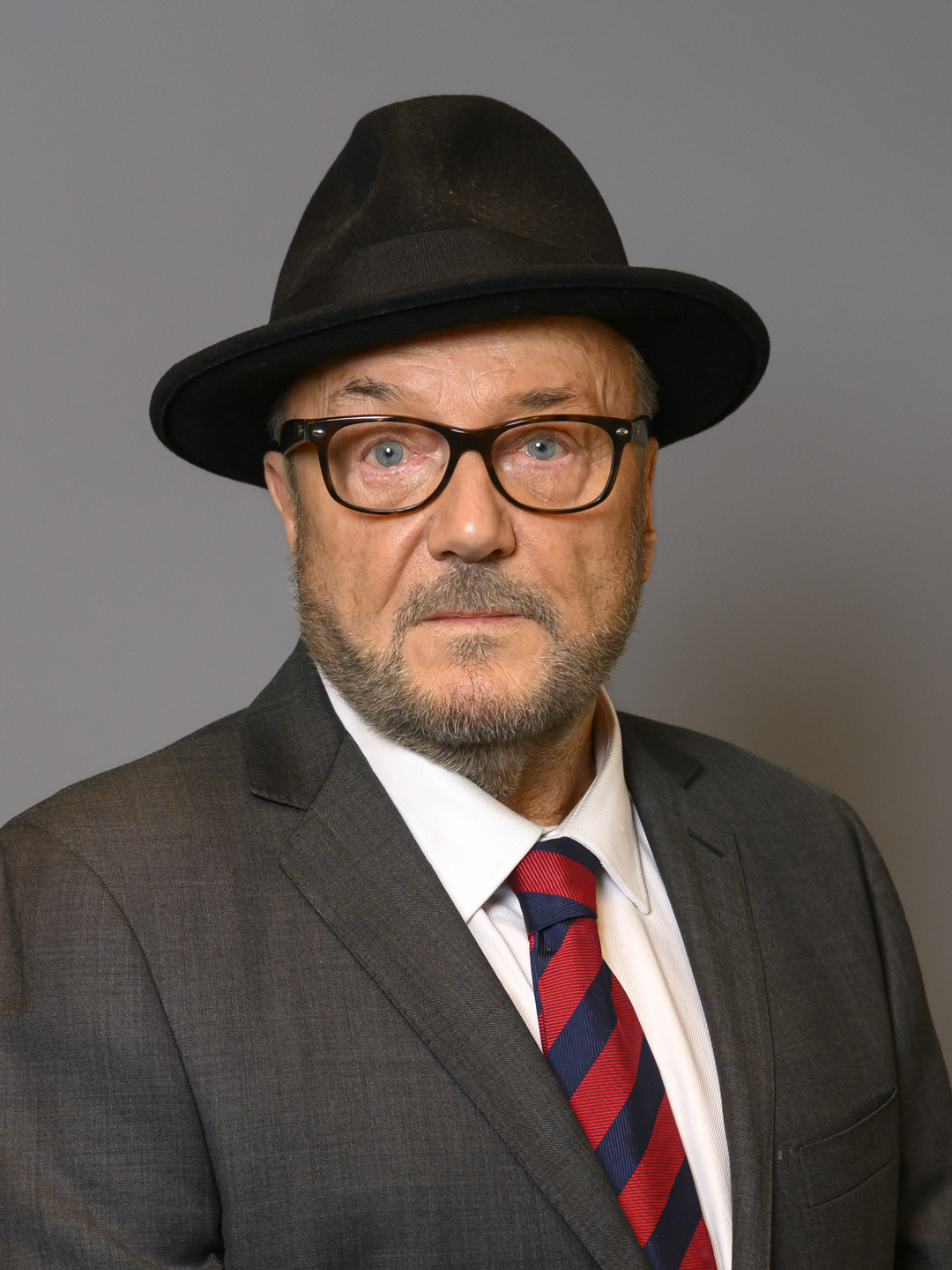
- Official portrait, 2024

Leader of the Workers Party of Britain
- Incumbent
- Assumed office 8 December 2019
- Deputy: Chris Williamson; Peter Ford; Joti Brar; Andy Hudd
- Preceded by: Party established

Leader of the Respect Party
- In office 10 June 2013 – 18 August 2016
- Deputy: Dawud Islam
- Preceded by: Arshad Ali
- Succeeded by: Party dissolved

Member of Parliament
- In office 29 February 2024 – 30 May 2024
- Preceded by: Tony Lloyd
- Succeeded by: Paul Waugh
- Constituency: Rochdale
- In office 29 March 2012 – 30 March 2015
- Preceded by: Marsha Singh
- Succeeded by: Naz Shah
- Constituency: Bradford West
- In office 5 May 2005 – 12 April 2010
- Preceded by: Oona King
- Succeeded by: Rushanara Ali
- Constituency: Bethnal Green and Bow
- In office 11 June 1987 – 11 April 2005
- Preceded by: Roy Jenkins
- Succeeded by: Constituency abolished
- Constituency: Glasgow Hillhead (1987–1997); Glasgow Kelvin (1997–2005)

Personal details
- Born: 16 August 1954 (age 72) Dundee, Scotland
- Party: Workers Party of Britain (since 2019)
- Other political affiliations: Labour (1967–2003); Independent Labour (2003); Respect (2004–2016); Independent (2016–2019); All for Unity (2020–2022)
- Spouses: Elaine Fyffe (m. 1979; div. 1999) Amineh Abu-Zayyad (m. 2000; div. 2009) Rima Husseini (m. 2005; div. 2010) Putri Gayatri Pertiwi (m. 2012)
- Children: 6
- Website: georgegalloway.com
- George Galloway's voice Galloway on Scottish independence Recorded 5 May 2019

George Galloway (born 16 August 1954) is a British politician, broadcaster, and writer. He has been leader of the Workers Party of Britain since he founded it in 2019, and is a former leader of the Respect Party. Until 2003, he was a member of the Labour Party. From 1987 to 2010, from 2012 to 2015, and briefly in 2024, Galloway served as Member of Parliament (MP) for five different constituencies. As of 2026, he is living in "self-imposed exile" in Russia.

Galloway was born in Dundee, Scotland. After becoming the youngest ever chair of the Scottish Labour Party in 1981, he was general secretary of the charity War on Want from 1983 until his election as MP for Glasgow Hillhead at the 1987 general election; he was re-elected three times. The Labour Party expelled him in 2003 due to comments he made in opposition to the invasion of Iraq. Galloway joined the Respect Party in 2004, and was its leader from 2013 to 2016. He was elected as MP for Bethnal Green and Bow at the 2005 general election. After losing in the neighbouring constituency of Poplar and Limehouse at the 2010 general election, he regained a parliamentary seat at the 2012 Bradford West by-election, only to lose it at the 2015 general election. He unsuccessfully stood as an independent candidate at the 2017 and 2019 general elections. Galloway then founded the Workers Party of Britain, and stood unsuccessfully for the party at the 2021 Batley and Spen by-election. Galloway won the 2024 Rochdale by-election. He lost the seat at the 2024 general election.

Galloway describes himself as both a socialist and socially conservative. He travelled to Ba'athist Iraq to meet government officials in the 1990s, and caused controversy for praising Saddam Hussein at a 1994 meeting, which he denied. Galloway founded the Mariam Appeal in 1998 to campaign against sanctions on Iraq. Galloway was accused of receiving illicit payments from Iraq's government, partly from money diverted from the United Nations' Oil-for-Food Program, defending himself at a 2005 United States Senate hearing. A staunch opponent of Israel and of Zionism, he supports the Palestinians in the Israeli–Palestinian conflict and was involved in the 2009 Viva Palestina aid convoys to the Gaza Strip. He supported Jeremy Corbyn in his leadership of the Labour Party. In 2016 he campaigned for the UK to leave the European Union, later supporting Nigel Farage's Brexit Party at the 2019 European Parliament election. He opposes Scottish independence, and founded the British unionist alliance All for Unity, which received 0.9 per cent of votes at the 2021 Scottish Parliament election. Galloway has supported the Russian invasion of Ukraine and blamed it on the West.

Galloway hosted the TalkRadio show The Mother of All Talk Shows from 2006 to 2010 and from 2016 until his dismissal in 2019. He then moved the show to social media platforms. He was a presenter on Russian state media outlet RT from 2013 to 2022, and was a presenter on Iranian state media outlet Press TV.

== Early life and career ==
=== Background and education ===
Galloway was born in Dundee, Scotland on 16 August 1954, to George Galloway Sr., a Scottish trade unionist, and Sheila O'Reilly, a Scot of Irish descent. Initially raised in Lochee, Dundee, he has described himself as "born in an attic in a slum tenement in the Irish quarter of Dundee, which is known as Tipperary". His father began as an electrician, before studying a degree to become an electromechanical engineer at NCR. After being made redundant, he retrained as a teacher. His mother was a cleaner, and then a factory worker. According to Galloway, his father was patriotic, while his mother had Irish nationalist sympathies, and was critical of perceived British pretensions in the world. He took his mother's side in arguments, and has been a long-time supporter of Sinn Féin and Irish reunification. David Morley, his biographer, has written that people who knew both father and son have said that they had Marxist opinions common in the local Labour Party movement of the time.

Galloway grew up in Charleston, Dundee, and attended Charleston Primary and then Harris Academy, in the city's West End, an academically selective and non-denominational state school, which became comprehensive in 1973. Galloway played for the school football team as well as for West End United U12s, Lochee Boys Club U16s and St Columba's U18s.

In a 2016 New Internationalist interview, Galloway speculated that an incident of sexual abuse from a colonel, which he suffered when he was 12, caused a "lifelong fear of being gay and this led me into ostentatious, rapacious heterosexual promiscuity". According to Galloway, he grew a moustache at the age of 15, and refused to shave it off when his headmaster objected. He decided, at the age of 18, never to drink alcohol; the reason was originally derived from comments by his father, and he has described alcohol as having a "very deleterious effect on people".

=== Labour Party organiser ===
Galloway joined the Labour Party Young Socialists aged 13, having falsely claimed to have been 15, and was still a teenager when he became secretary of the Dundee Labour Party.

Galloway became vice-chairman of the Labour Party in the City of Dundee and a member of the Scottish Executive Committee in 1975. On 5 May 1977, he contested his first election campaign in the Scottish district elections, but failed to hold the safe Labour Gillburn ward in Dundee, being defeated by the independent Bunty Turley. He became the secretary organiser of the Dundee Labour Party in 1977, and at 26, was the youngest ever chairman of the Scottish Labour Party in March 1981, a post he held for a year, after holding the vice-chairman post over the previous year.

After a trip to Beirut, Lebanon, during 1977, Galloway became a supporter of Palestine, stating during his libel case against The Daily Telegraph in 2004 that "barely a week after my return I made a pledge, in the Tavern Bar in Dundee's Hawkhill District, to devote the rest of my life to the Palestinian and Arab cause." He supported Dundee City Council when it flew the Palestinian flag over the City Chambers building, and was involved in the twinning of Dundee with the Palestinian West Bank town of Nablus in 1980.

In late 1981, in an interview for the Scottish Marxist, Galloway supported the affiliation of the Communist Party of Great Britain (CPGB) to the Labour Party, in the same way as the Fabian Society does. Believing that a deficiency in political theory was being filled by the entryist infiltration of the party by the Trotskyists (such as the Militant tendency), he thought the problem was better resolved by communist thinking from members of the CPGB. (He was later opposed to the expulsion of members of Militant.)

In response, Denis Healey, Deputy Leader of the Labour Party, tried and failed to remove Galloway from the list of prospective parliamentary candidates. Healey lost his motion by 13 votes to five. Galloway once quipped that, to overcome a £1.5 million deficit which had arisen in Dundee's city budget, he, Ernie Ross, and leading councillors should be placed in the stocks in the city square: "We would allow people to throw buckets of water over us at 20p a time."

In 1983, Galloway attempted to stand for the safe Labour seat of Rhondda after the Welsh Transport and General Workers' Union and the National Union of Miners had both nominated him to succeed Alec Jones, who had died. He hoped to be selected in the newly created seat of Dunfermline East, where no incumbent was standing. Galloway failed to be selected for either seat, with Rhondda selecting Allan Rogers, and Dunfermline East selecting future Chancellor of the Exchequer and later Prime Minister, Gordon Brown.

Standing as a candidate for a place on the Labour Party National Executive Committee in 1986, in a large field of 18 candidates, Galloway finished in 16th place.

=== War on Want ===
From November 1983 to 1987, Galloway was the general secretary of War on Want, a British charity campaigning against poverty worldwide. In this post he travelled widely, and wrote eye-witness accounts of the famine in Eritrea in 1985 which were published in The Sunday Times and The Spectator. His deputy at the charity, Simon Stocker, recalled: "If you went into a fight with George, you knew you would never walk out with a win."

On 28 October 1986, the Daily Mirror, in a front-page story by Alastair Campbell, alleged Galloway had spent £20,000 in expenses and had been "enjoying a life of luxury". An internal investigation, and later, an independent auditor, both cleared him of the accusation of any misuse of funds, although he did repay £1,720 in contested expenses. The official history of War on Want comments about Galloway that "even though the problems were not all of his own making, his way of dealing with them heightened tensions".

== MP for Glasgow Hillhead and Kelvin (1987–2005) ==
At the 1987 general election, Galloway was elected as the MP for Glasgow Hillhead gaining the seat for Labour from the SDP defeating Roy Jenkins with a majority of 3,251 votes. Although known for his left-wing political views, Galloway was never a member of the Campaign Group.

In September 1987, Galloway was asked by a journalist about his relationship to a woman during the 1986 War on Want conference on the Greek island of Mykonos. Galloway admitted having an extra-marital affair, saying:

I travelled to, and spent time in, Greece with lots of people, many of whom were women, some of whom were known carnally to me. I actually had sexual intercourse with some of the people in Greece. And if the British public and BBC Scotland think that's of interest they are welcome to broadcast it.

As a result, Galloway made front-page headlines in the tabloid press at the time. He and his first wife separated that year. In February 1988, the executive committee of his constituency Labour Party passed a vote of no confidence in him by 15 to 8. The constituency's general management committee voted 54-to-44 in favour of the motion a fortnight later on 22 February, although just three of the 25 members in the trade union section supported it.

Galloway gained re-selection when challenged by Trish Godman (wife of fellow MP Norman Godman) in June 1989, but failed to get a majority of the electoral college on the first ballot. This was the worst result for any sitting Labour MP who was reselected, but Galloway gained 62% in total in the final vote. Galloway assured his party there would be a "summer of peace and reconciliation" in his acceptance speech, but this did not happen. Many members of the party who had supported Godman reportedly refused to work for Galloway in the next election, including Johann Lamont, who later became Leader of the Scottish Labour Party in 2011. The following August, 13 of the 26 members of the constituency party's executive committee resigned, including Lamont. According to her, Galloway "has done nothing to build bridges with the Members of the Executive [Committee of the Constituency Labour Party] who opposed his selection." She told a journalist from The Guardian: "The quarrel we have is all about accountability, and democracy ... working in harmony, rather than any personal matters."

The Labour Party leadership election in 1992 saw Galloway voting for the eventually successful candidates, John Smith for leader and Margaret Beckett as deputy leader. In 1994, after Smith died, Galloway declined to cast a vote in the leadership election (one of only three MPs to do so). In a debate with the leader of the Scottish National Party, Alex Salmond, Galloway responded to one of Salmond's jibes against Labour by declaring "I don't give a fuck what Tony Blair thinks".

In 1997, Galloway's Glasgow Hillhead constituency was abolished and, although facing a challenge for the Labour nomination as the candidate for Glasgow Kelvin at the 1997 general election, Galloway defeated Shiona Waldron. He was unchallenged for the nomination for the 2001 general election. He was elected with majorities of 16,643 and 12,014 votes respectively. During the period he was Labour MP for Glasgow Kelvin, from 1997 to 2003, he voted against the whip 32 times, five votes out of 665 (0.8%) in the 1997–2001 parliament and the majority (27 votes out of 209 or 12.9%) in the period from the 2001 election until his expulsion from the Labour Party. He was one of several politicians arrested in February 2001 during a protest at the Faslane nuclear base in Scotland, which led to him being convicted of a breach of the peace and fined £180. In May 2002, he was among the 72 MPs who signed The Guardian's campaign to repeal the Act of Settlement 1701, alongside the Archbishop of York David Hope and several non-Anglican religious leaders.

=== Iraq and Saddam Hussein ===
Writing for The Observer in April 2003, David Aaronovitch speculated that Galloway's support for Ba'athist Iraq and Saddam Hussein may have been based on "the belief that my enemy's enemy is my friend. Or, in the context of the modern world, any anti-American will do. When Iraq stopped being a friend of the West it became a friend of George's." According to Tam Dalyell, Galloway had been the "only one MP that I can recollect making speeches about human rights in Iraq" in the House of Commons. Galloway opposed the 1991 Gulf War and was critical of the effect that the subsequent sanctions had on the people of Iraq.

==== Meetings with Saddam Hussein and Iraqi officials ====
In January 1994, Galloway faced some of his strongest criticism for a Middle Eastern trip, during which he met Saddam Hussein. At his meeting with the Iraqi president, Galloway told Saddam Hussein,

Your excellency, Mr President, I greet you in the name of the many thousands of people in Britain who stood against the tide and opposed the war ... I greet you too in the name of the Palestinian people ... I thought the president would appreciate knowing that even today, three years after the war, I still meet families who are calling their newborn sons Saddam ... Sir, I salute your courage, your strength, your indefatigability. And I want you to know that we are with you until victory, until victory, until Jerusalem (hatta al-nasr, hatta al-nasr, hatta al-Quds).

During Galloway's 2004 defamation case against the Daily Telegraph, the paper's defence Queen's Counsel accused Galloway of having "fawned over" Saddam during their meeting in 1994. Labour leader John Smith said: "I deeply deplore the foolish statement made in Iraq by Mr. George Galloway. In no way did he speak for the Labour Party and I wholly reject his comments". Galloway said that he was saluting the Iraqi people, rather than Saddam Hussein, and Galloway's friend Anas Altikriti observed that this is how it was translated for Saddam. Shortly after his return, Galloway was given a "severe reprimand" and "final warning" by the Labour Chief Whip, Derek Foster. Galloway apologised for his conduct and undertook to follow future instruction from the whips.

For his meeting with Saddam, Galloway was dubbed the "MP for Baghdad North". When he spoke before the U.S. Senate on 17 May 2005, Galloway said that he had "met Saddam Hussein exactly the same number of times as Donald Rumsfeld met him," but "The difference is Donald Rumsfeld met him to sell him guns ... I met him to try to bring about an end to sanctions, suffering and war".

In the late 1990s, Galloway allegedly lost favour with Saddam Hussein after telling an interviewer that he supported the Iraqi people rather than their president. In 1999, he met with Uday Hussein, Saddam's son.

On 6 May 2002, Galloway met with Deputy Prime Minister Tariq Aziz in Baghdad on his second visit to Iraq that year, accompanied by the Labour peer Nicolas Rea and Labour MPs Kerry Pollard and Robert Wareing. He was also scheduled to address a conference of solidarity with the Iraqi people. His party ran into the far-right Governor of Carinthia Jörg Haider returning from a meeting with Foreign Minister Naji Sabri. Galloway did not take his companions' suggestion to copy a scene from Casablanca by singing La Marsellaise in front of Haider.

On 8 August 2002, two days after the Iraqi invitation to resume talks in Baghdad was rejected by the United Nations Security Council and against the mounting threat of US invasion, Galloway was received for the second time by Saddam Hussein. Per Galloway's account, the meeting took place in a secret underground bunker near Baghdad. According to the Iraqi minutes from the meeting, examined in 2006 by the Parliamentary Commissioner for Standards Sir Philip Mawer and dismissed by Galloway as forgeries, Tariq Aziz, Naji Sabri and Saddam's personal secretary Abid Hamid Mahmud were in attendance as Galloway offered Saddam British staff to launch an English-language Iraqi satellite television channel, and said oil prices were having an impact on the income of the Mariam Appeal. In a radio interview given on the day following the discussion, Galloway said the Iraqi president was determined to show that his offer of readmitting the United Nations weapons inspectors into the country was sincere. Galloway said that the United States had nothing to lose by postponing its plans for invasion. In an 11 August article for The Mail on Sunday, Galloway wrote that Saddam "clearly understood that Iraq has to be seen to go the extra diplomatic mile" and that he expressed fondness for "everything quintessentially British". The piece was interpreted by the CNN as "the latest apparent charm offensive adopted by the Iraqi leader in the face of possible military action against it", and the British Foreign Office refused to consider the overtures. On 12 August, the Iraqi minister of information Muhammad Saeed al-Sahhaf rejected the return of the UN inspectors.

In January 2003, Galloway met with Saddam Hussein and Tariq Aziz once more. His claim that the encounter was held in an underground bunker was later contradicted by the Iraqi president's interpreter.

==== The Mariam Appeal ====
In 1998, Galloway founded the Mariam Appeal which was intended, according to its website's welcome page in 1999, "to campaign against sanctions on Iraq which are having disastrous effects on the ordinary people of Iraq". The campaign was named after Mariam Hamza, a child flown by the fund from Iraq to Britain to receive treatment for leukaemia. The intention was to raise awareness of the suffering and death of hundreds of thousands of other Iraqi children, due to poor health conditions and lack of suitable medicines and facilities, and to campaign for the lifting of the Iraq sanctions that many maintained were responsible for that situation. In 1999, Galloway was criticised for spending Christmas in Iraq with Tariq Aziz, who was Iraq's Deputy Prime Minister. In a 17 May 2005 hearing of the United States Senate Committee on Homeland Security and Governmental Affairs Permanent Subcommittee on Investigations, Galloway stated that he had many meetings with Aziz, and characterised their relationship as friendly. He said at another occasion that he and Aziz met more than ten times.

During the 2003 invasion of Iraq, the fund received scrutiny after a complaint that Galloway used some donated money to pay for his travel expenses. He responded by stating that the expenses were incurred in his capacity as the appeal's chairman. Although the Mariam Appeal was never a registered charity and never intended to be such, it was investigated by the Charity Commission. The report of this year-long inquiry, published in June 2004, found that the Mariam Appeal was undertaking charitable work (and so ought to have registered with the commission), but did not substantiate allegations that any funds had been misused. It emerged some years later that Galloway had appealed in a letter dated 24 April 2003 to Lord Goldsmith, the Attorney-General, to stop the investigation into the Mariam Appeal. According to a report in The Times, after the letter was released under the Freedom of Information Act, Galloway falsely asserted that the appeal "received no money from Iraq".

A further Charity Commission Report published on 7 June 2007 found that the appeal had received funds from Fawaz Zureikat that originated from the Oil-for-Food Programme, and concluded that,

Although Mr Galloway, Mr Halford and Mr Al-Mukhtar have confirmed that they were unaware of the source of Mr Zureikat's donations, the Commission has concluded that the charity trustees should have made further enquiries when accepting such large single and cumulative donations to satisfy themselves as to their origin and legitimacy. The Commission's conclusion is that the charity trustees did not properly discharge their duty of care as trustees to the Appeal in respect of these donations ... The Commission is also concerned, having considered the totality of the evidence before it, that Mr Galloway may also have known of the connection between the Appeal and the Programme.

Galloway, in response, stated: "I've always disputed the Commission's retrospective view that a campaign to win a change in national and international policy – a political campaign – was, in fact, a charity".

==== Iraq War and Labour Party expulsion ====
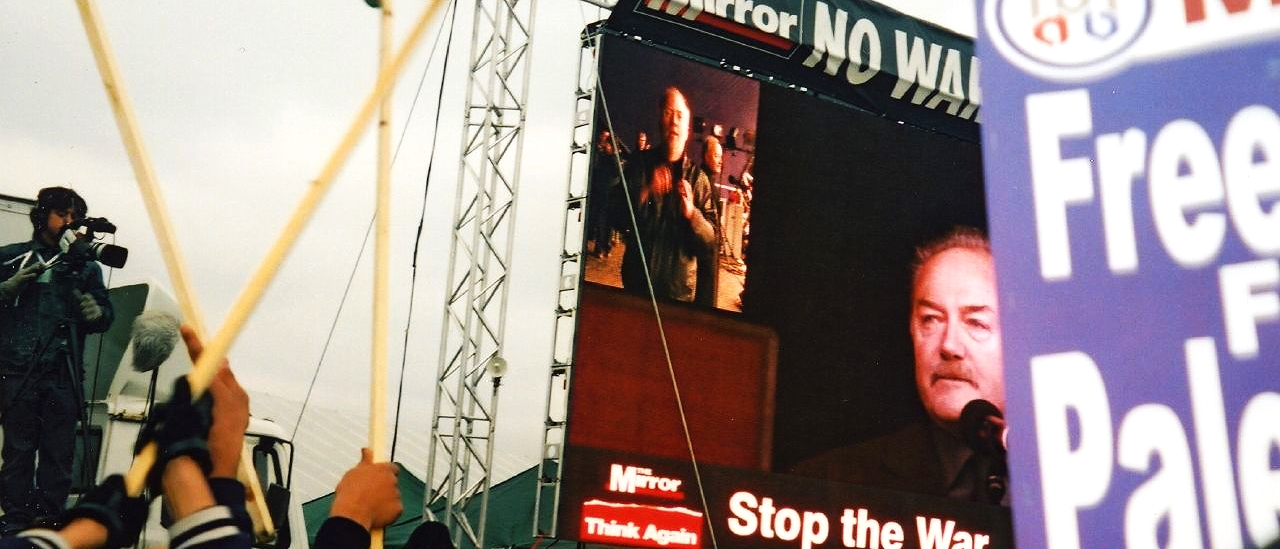
George Galloway addressing the 15 February 2003 anti-war protests in London

Galloway became the vice-president of the Stop the War Coalition in 2001. Actively involved, he often delivered speeches from StWC platforms at anti-war demonstrations. After permission for a rally in Hyde Park during the international anti-war protests on 15 February 2003 was initially refused, Galloway said the government had a choice between "half a million people at the rally or half a million people in a riot".

In I'm Not the Only One, Galloway wrote:

The only war that can be fought against a superpower is a war of movement. I brought Tariq Aziz all the writings of Che Guevara and Mao Tse Tung on the arts of revolutionary war and he had them translated into Arabic. Fight a war of movement, take the uniforms off, swim among the Iraqi people and whatever their views on the regime, they will undoubtedly provide deep aquifers of support for a patriotic resistance.

On 20 March 2003, a coalition including the United Kingdom and United States invaded Ba'athist Iraq. On 28 March 2003, Galloway said in an interview with Abu Dhabi TV:

Iraq is fighting for all the Arabs. Why don't the Arabs do something for the Iraqis? Where are the Arab armies? ... They [Tony Blair and George Bush] have lied to the British Air Force and Navy, when they said the battle of Iraq would be very quick and easy. They attacked Iraq like wolves. They attacked civilians. They encountered resistance from Iraqi forces and Iraqi people who are defending their dignity, religion and country ... It is better for Blair and Bush to stop this crime and this catastrophe. ... The best thing British troops can do is to refuse to obey illegal orders.

Labour leader Tony Blair said: "His comments were disgraceful and wrong. The National Executive will deal with it". Labour MP Tam Dalyell commented in Galloway's defence: "I think he is a deeply serious, committed politician and a man of great sincerity about the causes he takes up." On 6 May 2003, David Triesman, then general secretary of the Labour Party, suspended Galloway from holding office in the party pending a hearing on charges that he had violated the party's constitution by "bringing the Labour Party into disrepute through behaviour that is prejudicial or grossly detrimental to the Party." Galloway said he stood by every word of the Abu Dhabi interview.

The National Constitutional Committee, responsible for disciplinary matters in the Labour Party, held a hearing on 22 October 2003 to consider the charges, taking evidence from Galloway himself, from other party witnesses, viewing media interviews, and hearing character testimony from former cabinet minister Tony Benn, among others. The following day, the committee unanimously found Galloway guilty of four of the five charges: inciting Arabs to fight British troops, inciting British troops to defy orders, inciting voters to reject Labour MPs, and threatening to stand against Labour. Galloway was expelled from the Labour Party.

Galloway said after his expulsion: "This was a politically motivated kangaroo court whose verdict had been written in advance in the best tradition of political show trials". He claimed that other MPs who opposed the war, such as Bob Marshall Andrews and Glenda Jackson, would soon be expelled, but no other MP was expelled from the Labour Party for opposing the Iraq War. Ian McCartney, Labour Party chairman at the time, said Galloway was the only Labour MP who "incited foreign forces to rise up against British troops". Tony Benn questioned why Galloway strove to remain in the Labour Party despite calling its leadership a "blood-splattered, lying, crooked group of war criminals". Benn added, "It put me off George Galloway in a fairly fundamental way".

Following the 7 July 2005 London bombings, which killed 52 civilians, Galloway linked the attack to Western policies in the Middle East. He said Tony Blair and George W. Bush had "far more blood on their hands" than the terrorists who carried out the bombings, and called President Bush the world's "biggest terrorist".

=== Oil-for-Food profiting accusations ===
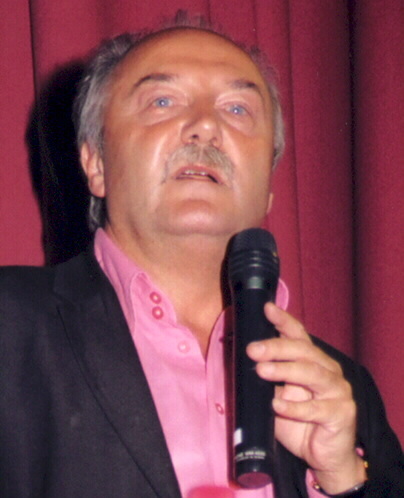
George Galloway speaking in September 2005

On 22 April 2003, The Daily Telegraph published news articles and comment describing documents found by its reporter David Blair in the ruins of the Iraqi Foreign Ministry. The documents purported to be records of meetings between Galloway and Iraqi intelligence agents, and they stated that he had received £375,000 per year from the proceeds of the United Nations (UN) Oil-for-Food Programme. Galloway denied the claims and pointed to the nature of the discovery within an unguarded, bombed-out building as being questionable. He successfully sued the newspaper for libel (see below).

The Christian Science Monitor also published a story on 25 April 2003, stating that it had documentary evidence that Galloway had received "more than ten million dollars" from the Iraqi government. However, on 20 June 2003, the Monitor reported that its own investigation had concluded that the documents were sophisticated forgeries.

In January 2004, it was reported that documents from Iraq's oil ministry showed that Galloway's Mariam Appeal received money from businessmen who had had allegedly illicitly siphoned profits from the UN oil-for-food program. Galloway said that money had been paid into the Mariam Appeal by Iraqi businessmen who had profited from the UN-run programme. He stated he had not benefited personally and that there was nothing illicit about the transaction:

It is hard to see what is dishonourable, let alone "illicit", about Arab nationalist businessmen donating some of the profits they made from legitimate UN-controlled business with Iraq to anti-sanctions campaigns, as opposed to, say, keeping their profits for themselves. It's equally difficult to understand why The Guardian should put seven of its finest journalists to work roping Tam Dalyell and Albert Reynolds into the rightwing witch-hunt against me, particularly on the basis of documents that may have been faked or doctored in the forgery capital of the world.

In July 2004, the HM Customs and Excise launched an investigation into the British involvement in alleged corruption related to the oil-for-food programme. The targets of the investigation were three Middle East businessmen living in Britain, two of whom donated money to the Mariam Appeal, while the third ran Friendship Across Borders for Tam Dalyell. In May 2005, before the reports by the US Senate and the UN had been published, The Guardian reporter David Pallister wrote that "despite all the investigations in the Oil-for-Food Programme, no one has ever produced any evidence that Iraqi oil money ended up in Mr Galloway's pocket".

==== US Senate ====
===== Senate allegations =====
In May 2005, a United States Senate committee report accused Galloway and others of receiving, from the Iraqi government, the right to buy oil under the UN's Oil-for-Food Programme. The report was issued by the US Senate Permanent Subcommittee on Investigations, chaired by Senator Norm Coleman, a Republican from Minnesota.

Coleman's committee said that Galloway received oil allocations worth 20 million barrels (3,200,000 m^{3}) from 2000 to 2003. The allegations against Galloway, had been made before, including in an October report by US arms inspector Charles Duelfer, as well as in the various purported documents described earlier in this section.

===== Senate hearing (17 May 2005) =====
External videos
- UK politician faces questions from senators (Galloway testifies before the Senate permanent subcommittee, 17 May 2005), from the Associated Press

On 17 May 2005, the committee held a hearing on allegations that Galloway received illicit payments from the Iraqi government through the Oil-for-Food Program. Attending Galloway's oral testimony and questioning him were two of the 13 committee members: the chair (Coleman) and the ranking Democrat (Carl Levin).

On arriving in the US, Galloway told Reuters: "I have no expectation of justice from a group of Christian fundamentalist and Zionist activists." He described Coleman as a "pro-war, neocon hawk and the lickspittle of George W. Bush", who, he said, sought vengeance against anyone who did not support the war in Iraq.

In his testimony, Galloway made the following statements in response to the allegations against him:

Senator, I am not now, nor have I ever been, an oil trader—and neither has anyone on my behalf. I have never seen a barrel of oil, owned one, bought one, sold one—and neither has anyone on my behalf. Now I know that standards have slipped in the last few years in Washington, but for a lawyer you are remarkably cavalier with any idea of justice. I am here today but last week you already found me guilty. You traduced my name around the world without ever having asked me a single question, without ever having contacted me, without ever having written to me or telephoned me, without any attempt to contact me whatsoever, and you call that justice.

Galloway countered the charges by claiming they were politically motivated and a "smokescreen". He accused Coleman and other pro-war politicians of covering up the "theft of billions of dollars of Iraq's wealth". He claimed this happened "on your watch" under the post-invasion Coalition Provisional Authority, and was committed by "Halliburton and other American corporations ... with the connivance of your own government".

===== Senate report (October 2005) =====
The report, by the then-majority Republican Party staff of the Senate committee, was published in October 2005. It stated that Galloway had "knowingly made false or misleading statements under oath". The report exhibits bank statements, which the authors claim show that $150,000 of proceeds from the Oil-for-Food Program had been paid to Galloway's wife Amineh Abu-Zayyad.

It also stated that Galloway (and the Mariam Appeal) received eight allocations of oil from the Iraqi government amounting to 23 million barrels from 1999 to 2003. The Mariam Appeal was also found to have improperly received $446,000 via the Oil-for-Food Program. Iraq's former prime minister Tariq Aziz was said to have told the investigators that oil had been allocated in the names of two of Galloway's representatives: Buhan Al-Chalabi and Fawaz Zureikat. Aziz had told the investigators: "These oil allocations were for the benefit of George Galloway and for Mariam's Appeal. The proceeds from the sale benefited the cause and Mr Galloway".

Galloway reiterated his denial of the charges and asked the US Senate committee to charge him with perjury so that he could confront the charges in court. He said the investigation was an attempt to divert attention from the "pack of lies" that led to the Iraq invasion in 2003. He said Coleman's motive was revenge over the embarrassment of his appearance before the committee in May. Galloway also said he spoke to Aziz's lawyers, who told him "Tariq Aziz absolutely denies ever saying that I benefited from oil deals".

==== UN committee report ====
The United Nations (UN) had set up its own committee, the 'Paul Volcker Committee', to investigate alleged corruption in the Oil-for-Food program. In its October 2005 report, it stated that "over 18 million barrels of oil were allocated either directly in the name of George Galloway ... or in the name of one of his associates, Fawaz Abdullah Zureikat, to support Mr Galloway's campaign against sanctions ... Zureikat received commissions for handling the sale of approximately 11 million barrels that were allocated in Mr Galloway's name". The report further holds that: "Iraq officials identified Mr Zureikat as acting on Mr Galloway's behalf to conduct the oil transactions in Baghdad".

The report states that payments of $445,000 were channelled through Galloway's Mariam Appeal, and claims that $120,000 from oil sales was paid into the bank account of Galloway's wife Amineh Abu Zayyad, who was also involved with the Mariam Appeal.

The committee chairman, Paul Volcker, suggested that his investigation had further material about Galloway which had not been published. He said "If the legal authorities in Britain want to discuss with us what other evidence we may have, that may not be in the report, then we would be prepared to co-operate".

However, the committee did not show evidence that any of the money was paid directly into accounts held by George Galloway. The report acknowledges that "both Mr Galloway and Mr Zureikat have denied that Mr Galloway was involved in obtaining the oil allocations or receiving any proceeds from the oil sales". Galloway wrote to the committee saying: "I had nothing to do with any oil deals done by Mr Fawaz Zureikat or anyone else. He and any other company involved were trading on their own behalf".

Aziz was also interviewed for the Volcker Committee, but changed his story, which the committee considered unconvincing.

==== Parliamentary Commissioner for Standards ====
When the allegations against Galloway emerged in 2003, the UK parliament's Commissioner for Standards began investigating, as Galloway was a Member of Parliament and none of the alleged funding had been declared in the Register of Members' Interests. The Commissioner, Philip Mawer, was overseen by the Standards and Privileges Committee. After a four-year investigation, he published a detailed report in 2007, which concluded:

I have not found a "smoking gun" which shows that Mr Galloway has, personally and directly, unlawfully received moneys from the former Iraqi regime. However I have amassed a very substantial body of evidence from a variety of sources which is generally internally consistent and, in my view:

a) Clearly shows that Mr Galloway's anti-sanctions work through the Mariam Appeal was in effect supported by the former Iraqi regime, through Mr Fawaz Zureikat and using, among other things, the mechanism of the Oil for Food Programme.

b) Clearly shows that Mr Galloway at best turned a blind eye to the fact that this was happening.

c) Shows that it is more likely than not that Mr Galloway knew about and was complicit in what was happening.

The Commissioner stated that he did not have "access to bank accounts held either solely by Mr Galloway or jointly by him with others".

=== Founding the Respect Party ===
Galloway wrote in an article for The Guardian at the end of October 2003 that he would soon be part of a coalition consisting of the "red, green, anti-war, Muslim and other social constituencies radicalised by the war." In January 2004, it emerged that Galloway would be working with the Socialist Workers Party in England and Wales, and others, under the name Respect – The Unity Coalition, generally referred to simply as "Respect". In the opinion of Nick Cohen of The Observer it was an "alliance ... between the Trotskyist far left and the Islamic far right."

Galloway announced in December 2003 that he would not force a by-election and did not intend to contest the next general election in Glasgow. His Glasgow Kelvin seat was to be split between three constituencies for the next general election. In one of these, the new Glasgow Central constituency, Mohammad Sarwar, the first Muslim Labour MP, wanted to be selected as the candidate. Galloway chose not to challenge him, announcing this decision at the end of May 2004 in his Mail on Sunday column.

== MP for Bethnal Green (2005–2010) ==
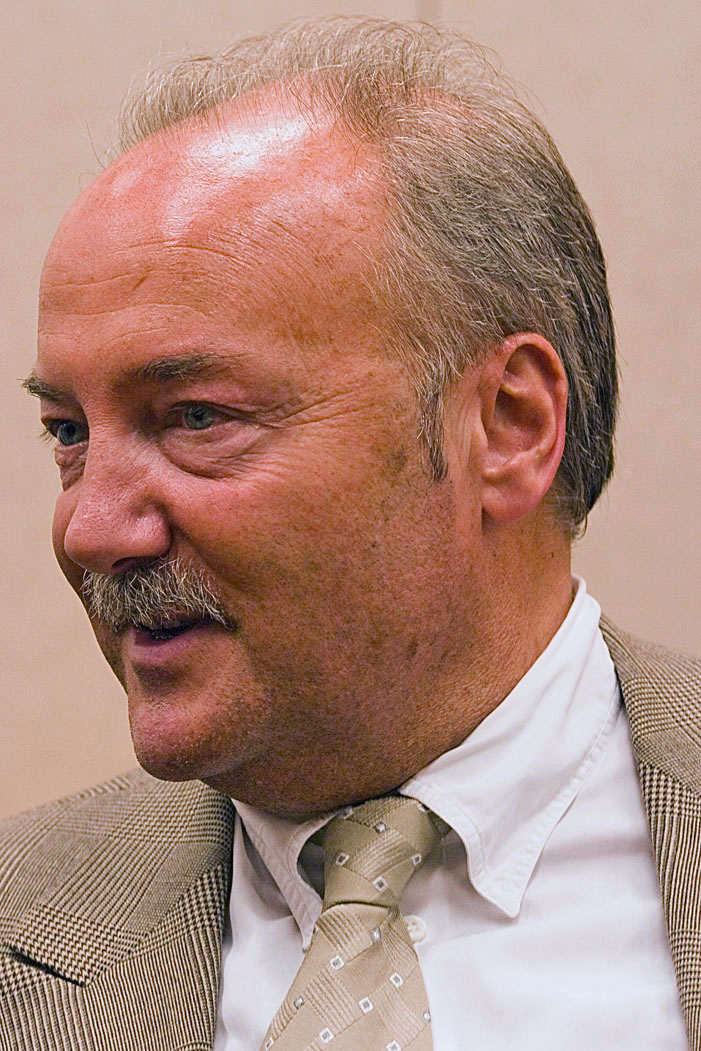
Galloway in September 2005

=== General election 2005 ===
After the 2004 European Parliamentary election results became known, in which Galloway stood in London, but did not gain a seat, he announced that he would stand in East London at the next general election. On 2 December, he confirmed that he was aiming to be nominated as the Respect Party candidate for Bethnal Green and Bow.

The ensuing electoral campaign in the seat proved to be a difficult one with heated exchanges between Galloway, Oona King (the incumbent Labour MP for Bethnal Green and Bow), and their respective supporters. Galloway and Respect threatened to sue King, whose mother is Jewish, if she repeated her assertion in the Evening Standard on 10 April 2005 which reported her as saying: "I have been told by several people that members of Respect have told Muslim voters 'not to vote for me because I am Jewish'". A major issue of the campaign was King's support for the Iraq War.

Galloway was asked at a hustings early in the campaign why he was standing against one of only two black female MPs to which he replied that King had "voted to kill a lot of women in the last few years. Many of them had much darker skins than her". Claiming to be the ghost of Old Labour, Galloway told The Sunday Times contributor A. A. Gill that "we're here to haunt new Labour". Bethnal Green and Bow is "where Labour was founded. We're giving birth to the Labour Party all over again".

Galloway said at a hustings event that the Labour Government had been pursuing a "war on Muslims" while King said her stance against Saddam Hussein had been "principled". Galloway received death threats from an offshoot of al-Muhajiroun (a banned extreme Islamist group). On 19 April, about 30 men forced Galloway's meeting with a tenants' association to be abandoned after claiming he was a "false prophet" for encouraging Muslims to vote. Galloway was held by the group for about 20 minutes before the police arrived at the scene. All the major candidates united in condemning the threats and violence. Both the Labour and Respect candidates were given police protection.

It emerged in a Channel 4 Dispatches programme in 2010 that the Islamic Forum of Europe, which advocates sharia law, had been involved in campaigning for Galloway in the Bethnal Green constituency. In a secretly recorded speech at a dinner shortly after his election, Galloway said that the involvement of the IFE had played "the decisive role" in his win. Although the IFE itself denied the accusation, Galloway admitted in a statement that the allegation was true.

On 5 May, Galloway gained the seat from the Labour Party with a narrow majority of 823 votes, and denounced the returning officer for alleged discrepancies in the electoral process. He was reported to have exploited the generational gap and garnered the support of young Muslim voters. After the election result became known, Galloway's spokesman, Ron McKay, rejected claims that King had been racially abused during the campaign and said it was King who had brought up her Jewish background.

In his acceptance speech, Galloway said "Mr Blair, this is for Iraq". During the BBC's election night coverage, Jeremy Paxman asked Galloway about whether he was happy to have removed one of the few black women in parliament, He replied: "I don't believe that people get elected because of the colour of their skin. I believe that people get elected because of their record and because of their policies". Oona King later told BBC Radio 4's Today programme that she found Paxman's line of questioning inappropriate. Galloway "shouldn't be barred from running against me because I'm a black woman. ... I was not defined, or did not wish to be defined, by either my ethnicity or religious background".

=== Celebrity Big Brother ===
In January 2006, Galloway appeared on the fourth series of the reality TV programme Celebrity Big Brother for nearly three weeks. During his time on the programme, he mimed licking imaginary milk, whilst pretending to be a cat, from the cupped hands of another housemate, actress Rula Lenska. He wrote later that his activities "were actually the same stunts that BBC presenters and celebs get up for Children in Need".

Galloway faced a claim at the time from Hilary Armstrong, Labour's Chief Whip, that he should "respect his constituents, not his ego". Ron McKay, his spokesman and friend, said of the imaginary milk incident: "I rather wish he hadn't been given that particularly silly task". It had been assumed, McKay said, that Galloway's comments about politics would not be cut. Just after his eviction, Galloway told presenter Davina McCall he was positive about having taken part, although when asked if he was "glad" to have participated, he said: "Not after I've seen those press cuttings."

Galloway wrote in a column for The Independent newspaper in November 2012 that his "antics on Big Brother" had "raised tens of thousands of pounds for the charity Interpal" and paid for an "extra caseworker in my constituency".

=== Suspension from parliament ===
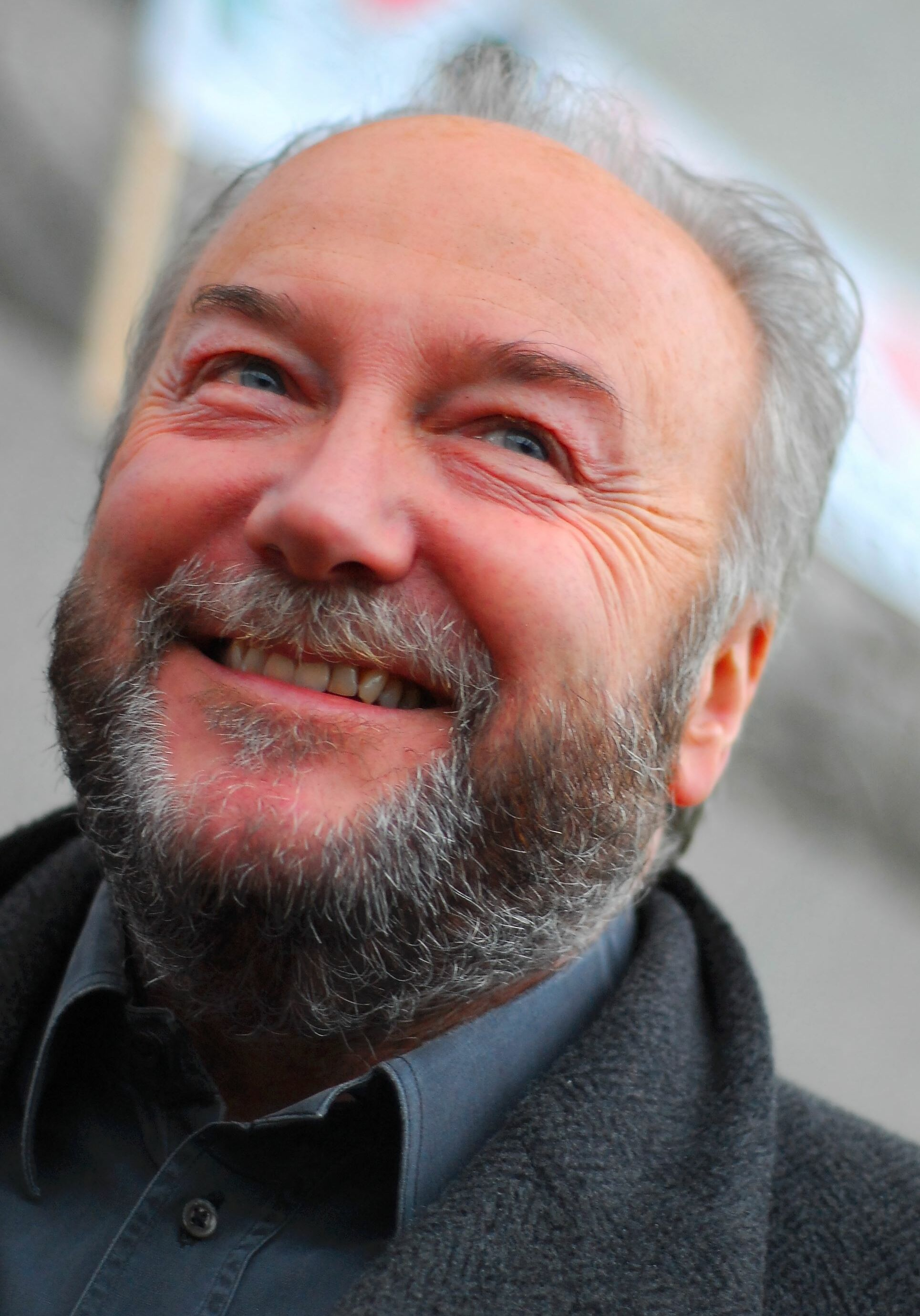
Galloway at a Stop the War event in February 2007

On 17 July 2007, following a four-year inquiry, the House of Commons Select Committee on Standards and Privileges published its sixth report. The Parliamentary Commissioner for Standards, in an addendum to the report, concluded that there was no evidence that Galloway gained any personal benefit from either the former Iraqi administration, or from the Oil-for-Food Programme, but admitted that some documents had been unavailable to him. However, the Committee concluded, in the main body of the report:

we agree with the Commissioner that there is strong circumstantial evidence that the Oil for Food Programme was used by the Iraqi government, with Mr Galloway's connivance, to fund the campaigning activities of the Mariam Appeal.

It found that Galloway's use of parliamentary resources to support his work on the Mariam Appeal "went beyond what was reasonable" and "we recommend that he apologise to the House, and be suspended from its service for a period of 18 actual sitting days."

Galloway's suspension was not intended to be immediate, and he was given the opportunity to defend himself in front of the committee members in the House of Commons on 23 July 2007. During the debate, Galloway repeatedly called into question the motives of the members of the Select Committee, in particular alleging that some of them were members of a political organisation named "Indict" and were persecuting him for speaking out against the Iraq War. Speaker Michael Martin warned Galloway that his accusations were not relevant to the matter at hand, but he rejected the warning and responded by saying that Martin would have to order him out of the house if he had any issue with the accusations. Martin therefore named Galloway, leading to the attending members voting to trigger his suspension from parliament that day rather than wait until after the summer recess as had been recommended.

The Respect Party split in the autumn of 2007, with the Socialist Workers' Party and Galloway's wing of Respect blaming each other for what he described as a "car crash on the left". Galloway did not seek re-election in Bethnal Green and Bow at the 2010 general election, fulfilling a pledge he made to only serve one parliamentary term in the constituency. He instead opted to stand in the neighbouring constituency of Poplar and Limehouse and received 8,160 votes coming third after the Labour and Conservative candidates.

=== Viva Palestina aid convoys ===
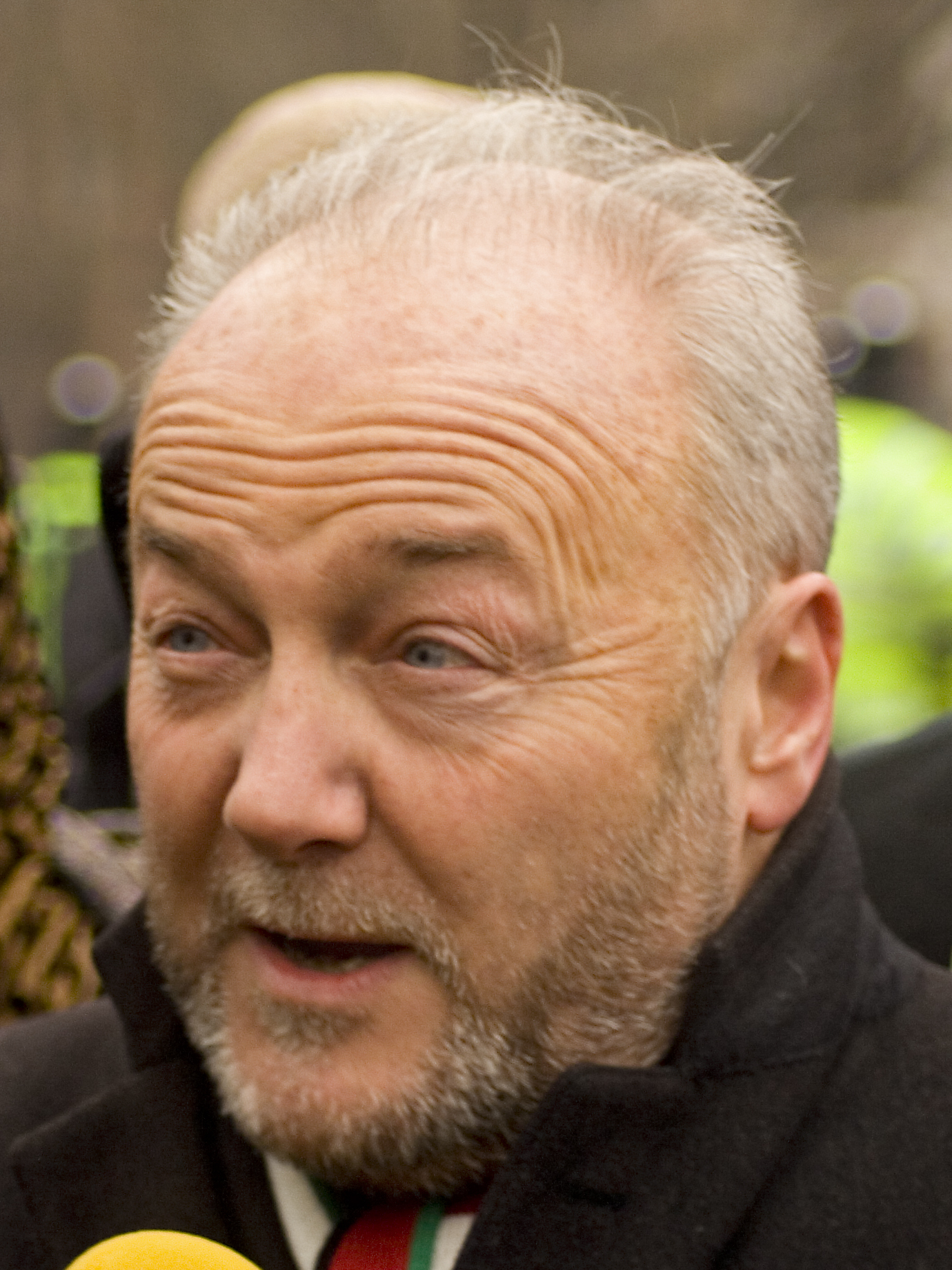
George Galloway at a January 2009 protest against the 2009 Gaza War

In response to the 2008–09 Israel–Gaza conflict Galloway instigated the Viva Palestina aid convoy to the Gaza Strip in January 2009. "There is a kind of intifada among the youth. They are determined to act", he told Cole Moreton writing for The Independent, adding, "We say, 'Don't be lured by the siren voices of separatism and extremism – join with us and express your anger politically, in a way that will be peaceful, non-violent, and not cost you your life, but will not cost other people their lives either".

By mid-February, the organisation said it had raised over £1,000,000 for humanitarian aid in four weeks, although the Charity Commission later found the true figure to be £180,000. On 14 February 2009, Galloway and hundreds of volunteers launched the convoy comprising approximately 120 vehicles intended for use in the Strip, including a fire engine donated by the Fire Brigades Union (FBU), 12 ambulances, a boat and trucks full of medicines, tools, clothes, blankets and gifts for children. The 5,000-mile route passed through Belgium, France, Spain, Morocco, Algeria, Tunisia, Libya and Egypt.

The convoy arrived in Gaza on 9 March, accompanied by approximately 180 extra trucks of aid donated by Libya's Gaddafi Foundation. On 10 March 2009, Galloway announced at a press conference in Gaza City attended by several senior Hamas officials: "We are giving you now 100 vehicles and all of their contents, and we make no apology for what I am about to say. We are giving them to the elected government of Palestine", adding that he would personally donate three cars and £25,000 to Hamas organisation "Prime Minister" Ismail Haniyeh.

On 8 April 2009, Galloway joined Vietnam War veteran Ron Kovic to launch Viva Palestina US. A third Viva Palestina convoy began travelling at the end of 2009. On 8 January 2010, Galloway and his colleague Ron McKay were deported from Egypt immediately following their entry from Gaza. They had been attempting to help take about 200 aid trucks into the Gaza Strip. They were driven by the police to the airport and placed on a plane bound for London.

The Foreign Ministry of Egypt released a statement reading: "George Galloway is considered persona non grata and will not be allowed to enter into Egypt again". Shortly after his deportation, Galloway said, "It is a badge of honour to be deported by a dictatorship" and "I've been thrown out of better joints than that."

Viva Palestina was registered as a charity in April 2009 but, following its continued non-submission of accounts, ceased to be recognised as a charitable organisation in November 2013. It was taken over by the Charity Commission in October 2014, which appointed an accountant to oversee the group because of the concerns over its financial management.

=== 2011 Scottish Parliament election ===
In January 2011, Galloway launched his campaign in preparation of the May Scottish Parliament election, announcing that he would standing in the Glasgow region.

Respect and Solidarity formed an alliance for the election, with Galloway being their top candidate in Glasgow.

On the regional ballot, Respect-Solidarity polled 6,972 list votes (3.3%), failing to elect any candidates, though did finish ahead of the Liberal Democrats who lost their seat.

== MP for Bradford West (2012–2015) ==
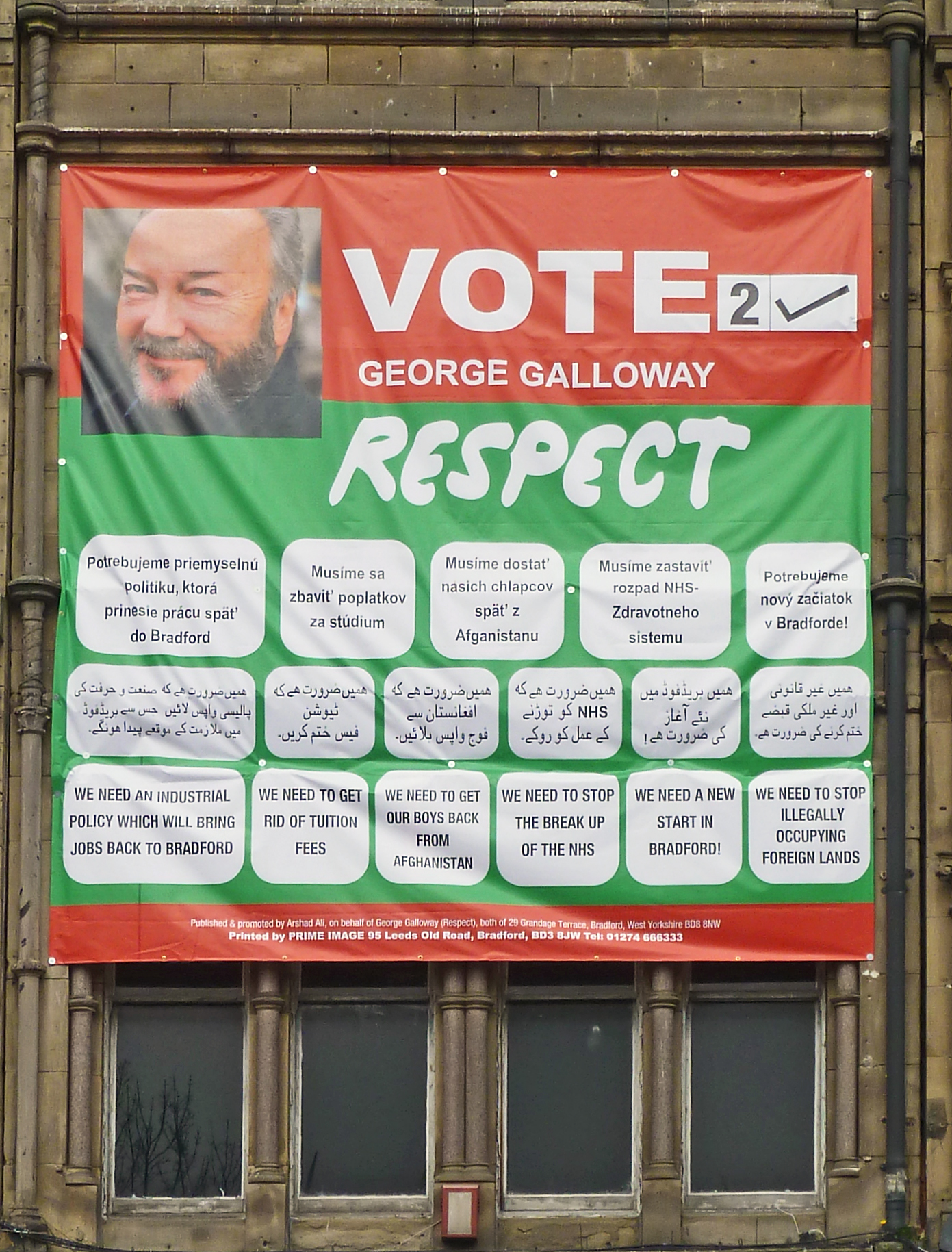
George Galloway election poster in Bradford, 2012

=== By-election 2012 ===
After the resignation of Labour MP Marsha Singh due to ill health, Galloway returned to parliament at the March 2012 Bradford West by-election in an unexpected landslide result, with Galloway calling it "the most sensational victory in British political history." His 36% swing, defeating the Labour candidate Imran Hussain, was amongst the largest in modern British political history. Jeremy Corbyn, then a backbench Labour MP, congratulated him in a tweet. Galloway described the result as a "Bradford spring" (after the Arab Spring) and said that it showed the "total rejection" by voters of the three leading political parties.

The election campaign was marked by controversy, in particular over the role of sectarianism, Baradari (clan) networks, and allegations about rivals' lack of "Islamic values" Andrew Gilligan noted in The Daily Telegraph that Galloway had won in wards with a predominantly white electorate as well as those with a majority Muslim population. Nick Robinson, the BBC's political editor, believed it was "a one-off political coup by a political one-off" in a seat which has not followed national trends in the past. The novelist Howard Jacobson in The Independent wrote that Galloway's "campaign shamelessly courted Muslim prejudice in smaller matters such as alcohol – where Galloway painted himself as more Muslim than the Muslim Labour candidate whom he accused of liking, shock horror, a tipple." Patrick Cockburn in The Independent on Sunday commented: "It says something about the comatose nature of British politics that an effective critic of ... failed wars like Mr Galloway, who beats an established party, should be instantly savaged as a self-serving demagogue."

In October 2013, the Total Politics magazine published an interview with Galloway in which he admitted: "I like elections more than I like serving", and said that he found being an MP was "2% terrifying, and 98% tedium." By 2013, he was a prolific user of Twitter where he had over 116,000 followers.

In late 2013, Galloway became Leader of the Respect Party.

=== Comments on Julian Assange sexual assault allegations ===
Galloway was criticised for comments he made in August 2012 on the legal case involving Wikileaks' Julian Assange in a podcast released on YouTube. He stated that "I think that Julian Assange's personal sexual behaviour is something sordid, disgusting, and I condemn it." Swedish prosecutors wanted to question Assange in relation to the alleged sexual assault of two women, an accusation he has rejected.

Galloway continued by stating: "But even taken at its worst, if the allegations made by these two women were true, 100 per cent true, and even if a camera in the room captured them, they don't constitute rape, at least not rape as anyone with any sense can possibly recognise it." He also stated that "not everybody needs to be asked prior to each insertion." He continued by saying that the allegations, even if true, "don't constitute rape" because initiating sex with someone who is asleep after a sexual encounter the previous night is not rape (one of the women, he said, "woke up to him [Assange] having sex with her again – something which can happen, you know"). He said that Assange's alleged actions amounted to no more than "bad sexual etiquette", and he did not believe the women's story anyway.

According to British barrister Felicity Gerry, Galloway's description of rape is not correct under English law. Galloway's comments were criticised by anti-rape campaigners as "ignorant", "very unhelpful", "offensive" and "deeply concerning." Then-Respect Party leader Salma Yaqoob described Galloway's comments as "deeply disappointing and wrong." She subsequently resigned from her post and the party. Yaqoob later stated that having to choose between Galloway's "anti-imperialist stances" and standing up for the rights of women was "a false choice."

Galloway subsequently lost his job as a columnist for Holyrood, a Scottish political magazine, for refusing to apologise for his remarks, and subject to a No platform policy by the National Union of Students.

=== Oxford debate walkout, 2013 ===
On 20 February 2013, Galloway walked out of a publicised debate when he found out that his opponent had Israeli citizenship. The debate, hosted by Oxford University's Christ Church, was on the topic "Israel should withdraw immediately from the West Bank". Galloway interrupted his opponent, Eylon Levy, a third-year PPE student, to ask whether he was an Israeli. When Levy acknowledged his joint British–Israeli nationality, Galloway stood up and stated "I don't recognise Israel and I don't debate with Israelis" and left the meeting. Explaining his actions on his Facebook page, Galloway wrote:

The reason is simple: no recognition, no normalisation. Just boycott, divestment and sanctions, until the apartheid state is defeated. I never debate with Israelis nor speak to their media. If they want to speak about Palestine – the address is the PLO.

Galloway later said on his Twitter feed that he had been "misled", writing that "Christ Church never informed us that the debate would be with an Israeli. Simple." The organiser, Mahmood Naji, denied Galloway's allegations in an open letter, explaining: "At no point during my email exchange with Mr Galloway's secretary was Eylon's nationality ever brought up or mentioned ... nor do I expect to have to tell the speaker what his opponent's nationality is."

Galloway's behaviour was criticised by Julian Huppert, the Liberal Democrat MP for Cambridge, and The Times. The Palestinian Boycott, Divestment and Sanctions (BDS) National Committee subsequently released a statement indicating that, while it does support a "boycott of Israel", the campaign rejects boycotting an individual "because she or he happens to be Israeli or because they express certain views."

In a debate at The Oxford Union the following October, Galloway compared the support of debating Israeli Zionists with that of supporting South African apartheid. Referring indirectly to his encounter with Aslan-Levy, Galloway said that he had worked with Jewish anti-apartheid activists in South Africa, adding "So Jews don't have to be on the side of apartheid".

=== Declaring an "Israel-free zone", 2014 ===
On 2 August 2014, during the 2014 Israel–Gaza conflict, Galloway delivered a speech at a public meeting in Leeds. He said:

We have declared Bradford an Israel-free zone. We don't want any Israeli goods, we don't want any Israeli services, we don't want any Israeli academics coming to the university or the college, we don't even want any Israeli tourists to come to Bradford even if any of them had thought of doing so. We reject this illegal, barbarous, savage state that calls itself Israel. And you have to do the same.

Galloway's remarks drew sharp criticism from British politicians and Jewish leaders. Conservative MP and pro-Israel campaigner Robert Halfon described Galloway's words as an "ill-considered rant that will cause great offence to many" while adding that "most Bradford citizens are like British people as a whole: tolerant and decent – and will ignore Mr Galloway's demands, treating them with the contempt they deserve." Jonathan Arkush, then vice-president of the Board of Deputies of British Jews stated that Galloway "is so intolerant he can't bear to have someone with an opposing view in his town".

Daniel Taub, the Israeli ambassador to the UK, visited Bradford on 18 August in response to an invitation, where he met with local councillors, faith leaders and community representatives. In an interview, Taub commented that his visit was proof that "the people of Bradford [have] sent a clear message that George Galloway does not represent them." Galloway told a reporter from the BuzzFeed website: "As has just been proved, I cannot make Bradford an Israel-free zone, but I am certain that the Israeli ambassador was not welcome." Galloway accused the councillors who had invited the ambassador of fraternising with a "mouthpiece for murder".

West Yorkshire Police investigated two complaints to determine if Galloway's words constituted hate speech (British law prohibits discrimination based on nationality). Galloway was questioned under caution by the police and the matter was referred to the Crown Prosecution Service. Galloway subsequently criticised the police investigation, describing it as "an absolute and despicable attempt to curb my freedom of speech". In October 2014, it emerged that Galloway would not be prosecuted for his comments on the grounds of "insufficient evidence", although West Yorkshire Police had "recorded this matter as a hate incident."

On 29 August 2014, Galloway was assaulted in Notting Hill by Neil Masterson, a convert to Judaism, and suffered a bruised rib and severe bruising on his head and face and was hospitalised overnight. Masterson was charged with religiously aggravated assault and sentenced to 16 months in prison. Released from prison in September 2015, he soon returned to jail for a month after breaking a restraining order forbidding him from contacting Galloway. Masterson was also fined for harassment.

On 13 October 2014, Galloway abstained from a vote in the House of Commons formally recognising Palestine because the motion included the recognition of Israel as well. On the Respect website he advocated a one-state solution.

=== General election 2015 ===
During a hustings meeting in Galloway's Bradford West constituency on 8 April during the 2015 general election heated exchanges occurred between Galloway and the Labour candidate, Naz Shah. Galloway accused her of lying about her forced marriage which had been the subject of an open letter written by Shah and released to the media after her selection as a candidate. He said Shah was in error in claiming she was "subject to a forced marriage at the age of 15. But you were not 15. You were 16-and-a-half". He then produced what he said was her nikah, a Muslim marriage certificate.

Shah alleged at the event that Galloway's representative in Pakistan impersonated her deceased father to acquire the nikah. Ron McKay, Galloway's spokesman, said that there was no dishonesty in gaining access to the document via an intermediary in Pakistan. Labour supplied media outlets with a copy of Shah's nikah which confirms that she was 15 at the time of her forced marriage. By her own account, Shah was raped during the marriage, but in an email to Helen Pidd, The Guardian's northern editor, McKay disputed that it had been a forced marriage at all.

Galloway accused Shah of favouring Israel. At one point during the campaign, Galloway tweeted a picture of Israelis waving Israeli flags with the caption "Thank you for electing Naz Shah". The image was juxtaposed with another, showing Palestinians celebrating his own supposedly imminent victory. Shah said she has participated in marches supporting the Palestinian cause.

Galloway was defeated at the 2015 general election. Naz Shah won a majority of 11,420 votes over him, reversing the majority of 10,000 votes he had gained at the by-election three years earlier.

On 10 May 2015, Galloway announced an intention to challenge the result, alleging that false statements and malpractice related to postal votes during the campaign meant that the result of the election should be set aside, but did not do so. The Fawcett Society expressed concern that "the continued opposition of the unsuccessful Respect Party candidate George Galloway, to Shah's election is the culmination of a sexist electoral campaign by Galloway". In July 2015, Jeremy Corbyn said he thought "... the tactics he used against our candidate, were appalling. I was quite shocked; it was appalling."

It emerged in January 2017 that Galloway's reimbursed expense claim for the rent of his constituency office in Bradford West has been forwarded by the Independent Parliamentary Standards Authority (IPSA) to the Metropolitan Police, which was then at the early assessment stage.

== Political career outside Parliament (2015–2023) ==
During his unsuccessful 2015 general election campaign to be re-elected for Bradford West, Galloway announced he would stand in the 2016 London mayoral election if he lost. Journalist Dave Hill accused Galloway of making "cutting personal attacks" about Labour mayoral candidate Sadiq Khan, a Muslim whom "Galloway ... appears to consider ... an inadequate practitioner of his faith" (a reference to Galloway's remark that Khan held the Quran in his left, not right, hand, and it "wasn't missed by people who care about these things"). In the final result, Galloway came seventh with 37,007 (1.4%) first preference votes. After second preferences were accounted for, Khan became mayor.

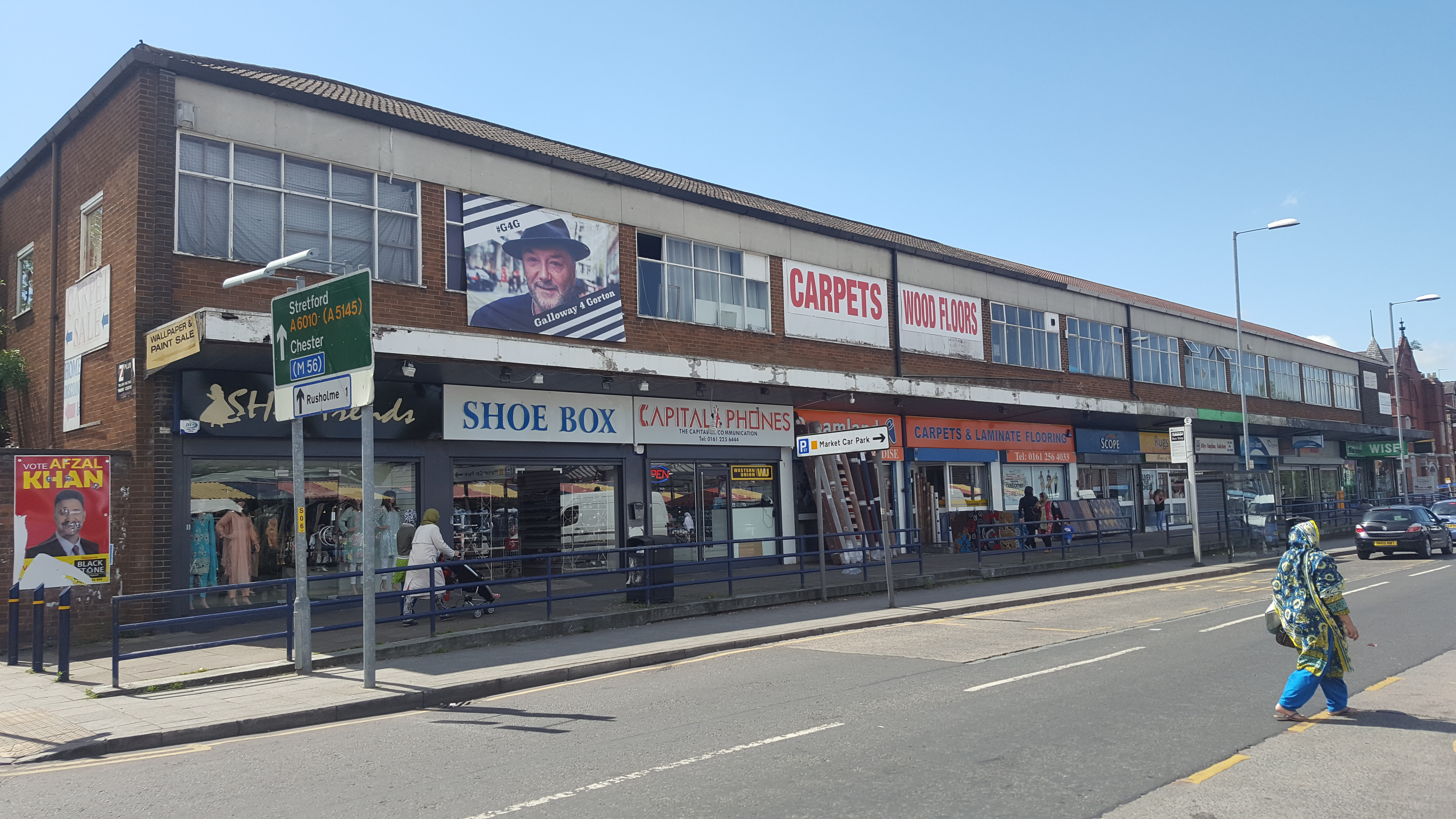
George Galloway poster in Longsight in 2017

In July 2015, Galloway endorsed Jeremy Corbyn's campaign in the Labour Party leadership election. He tweeted: "Congratulations to Jeremy Corbyn MP and good fortune in the labour leadership contest. If he wins it will change everything ..." He said that he would become a Labour Party member "pretty damn quick" if Corbyn was elected as leader. Less than a week after Corbyn became leader, a Labour spokeswoman told The Times: "George Galloway has not applied to rejoin the Labour party and he will not be receiving an invitation." Corbyn said in July 2015 that he was appalled at the tactics Galloway used while defending his seat against Naz Shah (Labour) during the general election. In December, Corbyn said that Galloway's readmission to the party was a decision not within his powers. In July 2016, Galloway endorsed Corbyn's campaign in the Labour Party leadership election. He said: "If Corbyn wins a big victory – and I think he will – then that should be, and it's important that it is, the final burial of Blair and Blairism."

Following Ken Livingstone's much criticised comments in April 2016 concerning Adolf Hitler and Zionism, Galloway supported Livingstone's argument. Galloway disputed that Livingstone's comments were antisemitic. "The Israel lobby has just destroyed the Labour Party", he tweeted in May 2016. "It is an amazing achievement".

The Respect Party "voluntarily deregistered" from the Electoral Commission on 18 August 2016. It was announced in March 2017 that Galloway was standing as an independent candidate at the Manchester Gorton by-election, following the death of Sir Gerald Kaufman. Gorton had been one of Labour's safest seats. The by-election was cancelled following the announcement of the 2017 snap general election being held on 8 June. Galloway transferred his candidacy to the general election. Labour easily retained the seat; Galloway came a distant third with 6% of the vote.

In the 2019 general election, Galloway contested the Parliamentary seat of West Bromwich East as an independent, describing himself as supportive of Corbyn's leadership and Brexit. He came sixth with 489 votes.

On 14 December 2019, Galloway launched the Workers Party of Britain, which describes itself as "economically radical with an independent foreign policy" and "unequivocally committed to class politics". Galloway is the party's leader. In 2020 Galloway announced his intention to stand in an expected by-election in Rutherglen and Hamilton West, after sitting MP Margaret Ferrier breached COVID regulations, but the by-election was not held for 3 years.

Galloway led All for Unity in the 2021 Scottish Parliament election and announced his intention to vote for the Conservative Party on the constituency vote, and for his party on the list vote. This contradicted other occasions when he said voting Conservative was something he would never consider. All for Unity received 23,299 votes in the election, or 0.9%, placing the party 7th nationally, with no seats.

In May 2021, Galloway announced his intention to stand for the 2021 Batley and Spen by-election. Labour accused Galloway's campaign of intimidatory tactics. Galloway came third with 22% of the vote, and said he would challenge the outcome of the election in court, as he said lies were told about him during the campaign. In May 2022, Galloway posted a video saying he might "put my own hat in the ring" and run in the 2022 Wakefield by-election for the Workers Party, while criticising Labour's candidate selection process. However, Galloway stated that he would prefer for a local Labour candidate to stand.

== MP for Rochdale (2024) ==
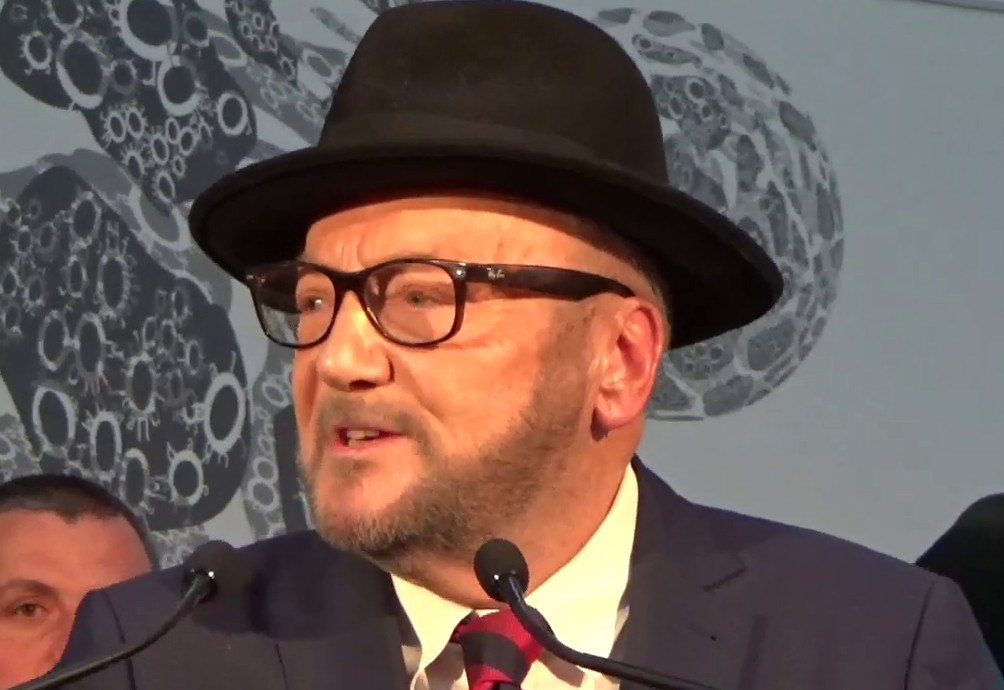
Galloway making his post-declaration speech at the 2024 Rochdale by-election count

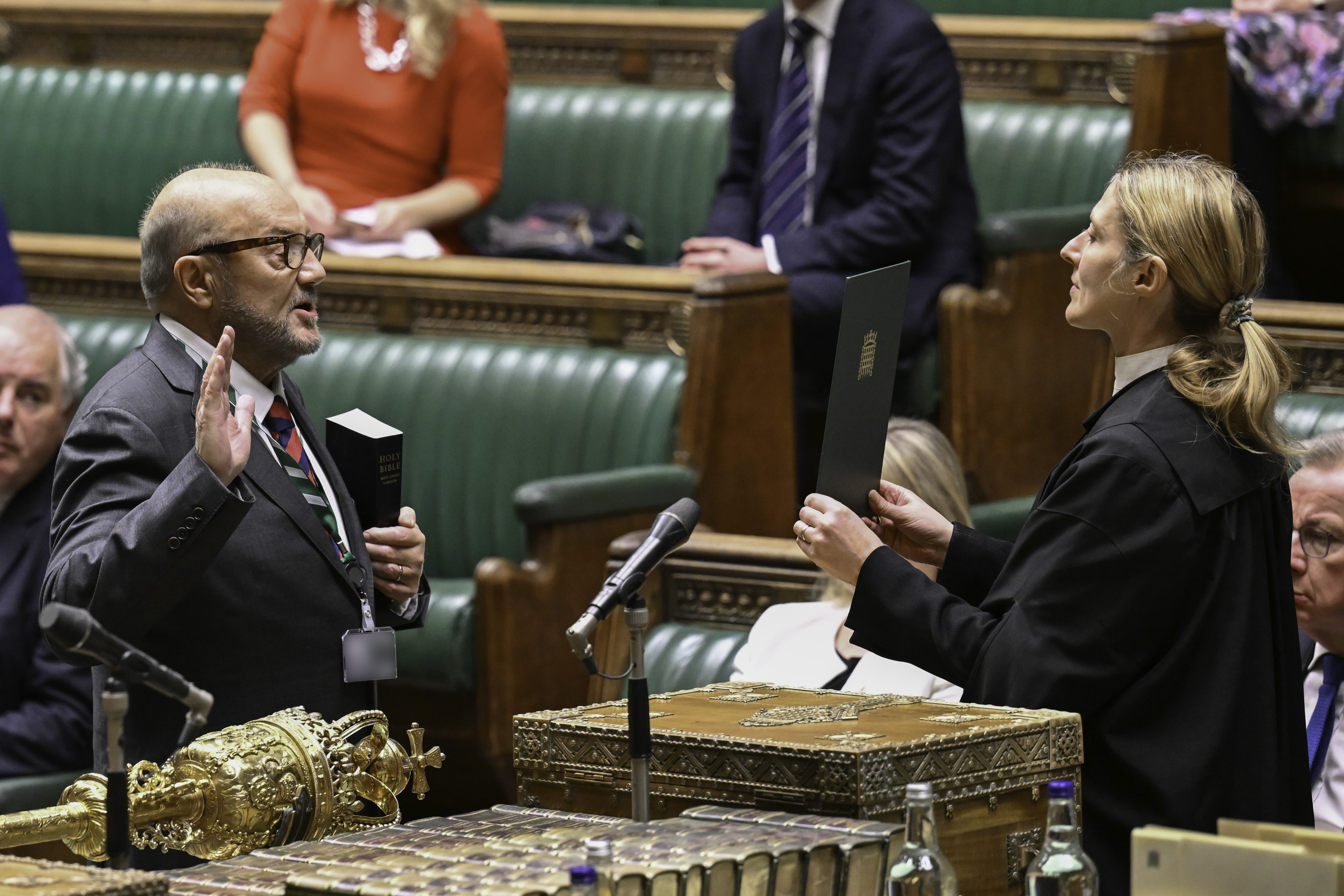
Galloway being sworn in as the MP for Rochdale, 4 March 2024

In January 2024, Galloway announced that he would stand in the Rochdale by-election the following month, again for the Workers Party of Britain. Galloway claimed he received a text from Richard Tice to be the Reform UK party candidate. He was elected in a political upset after Azhar Ali, the Labour candidate, lost the support of his party due to comments made regarding the Hamas-led attack on Israel. Galloway won almost 40% of the vote and overturned a Labour majority of 9,668. The Gaza war dominated the campaign. In his election speech, Galloway said "Keir Starmer, this is for Gaza. You will pay a high price for the role that you have played in enabling, encouraging and covering for the catastrophe presently going on in occupied Gaza, in the Gaza Strip". Alluding to the size of his win over the Labour and Conservative candidates, he said, "Keir Starmer and Rishi Sunak are two cheeks of the same backside and they both got well and truly spanked tonight here in Rochdale." Galloway chose to make a religious oath rather than a secular affirmation when being sworn into parliament; in which he held a Bible and swore allegiance to King Charles and his heirs upon God.

On 23 May 2024, Galloway confirmed he would be running for re-election in Rochdale at the 2024 general election. Galloway polled 11,508 votes and lost the seat to Labour's Paul Waugh, who polled 13,047 votes. Galloway did not attend the vote count. He was MP for Rochdale for 92 days.

== Post-parliamentary career (2024–present) ==
In June 2025, Galloway renounced his opposition to Scottish independence, saying that he would now be in favour of a second referendum. Writing on X, he said: “We support the right of the Scots to self-determination. Eleven years after they last did so we believe the time for another referendum is close. Given the collapsing authority of the British state, the pitiful prime minister Starmer and the moral decline of British society, the result cannot easily be predicted. Britain has become a cesspit." This followed a comment Galloway had made on X in September 2024, in which he said: "You COULD persuade me to Scottish Independence, you could never persuade me to the SNP."

In August 2025, Galloway announced that he would be contesting the 2026 Scottish Parliament election as the Workers Party candidate for Glasgow Southside. Additionally, he said that he would be second on the party list for the Glasgow region. In a press conference shortly after his election as MP for Rochdale in February 2024, Galloway had said that he was "no longer involved in Scottish politics", though did mention his support of the SNP's stance on Gaza, adding that they had been “outstanding on the Gaza question, at least by comparison with the two big parties of the state”. In light of this, he revealed that friend and lead candidate for Glasgow, Yvonne Ridley, had persuaded him to stand. By the time of nominations closing in April 2026, however, Galloway was no longer standing as a constituency candidate in Glasgow Southside, though remained on the regional ballot. He was unsuccessful, as were all other Workers Party candidates in the election.

On 27 September 2025, while returning from Moscow through Abu Dhabi, George Galloway and his wife Putri Gayatri Pertiwi were stopped and questioned at Gatwick Airport by the Metropolitan Police's Counter Terrorism Command under the Counter-Terrorism and Border Security Act 2019 and questioned on his opinions of Russia, and China. His party condemned this as "politically motivated intimidation". The Metropolitan Police said "Neither of them were arrested and they were allowed on their way". Following the arrest Galloway entered a "self-imposed exile" in Russia.

On the 4 September 2026, the Bank of Scotland closed Galloway's account prompting him to condemn the bank on X, saying "I will not stand by while you use your usurious power to wreck my family life." on the matter.

In preparation for the 2026 Greater Manchester mayoral by-election, Galloway announced his candidacy on 19 June 2026. However, when nominations were released on 6 July, he was not listed as a candidate and was not included on the ballot.

On the 14 September 2026 George Galloway announced his intention to stand in the 2026 Holborn and St. Pancras by-election on his podcast, MOATS. A day later he confirmed that he would stand and was listed as a candidate, decrying Green Party leader Zack Polanski for former comments against Jeremy Corbyn and Polanski's stance on social issues. His decision to stand sparked a controversy within his party, with deputy leader Chris Williamson resigning and urging the party to support Polanski. On the 21 September, Galloway continued the campaign abroad now in South Africa attempting to pressure the country into ending coal exports to Israel , as part of a larger campaign against their conduct in the Israeli-Palestinian conflict.

== Political views ==
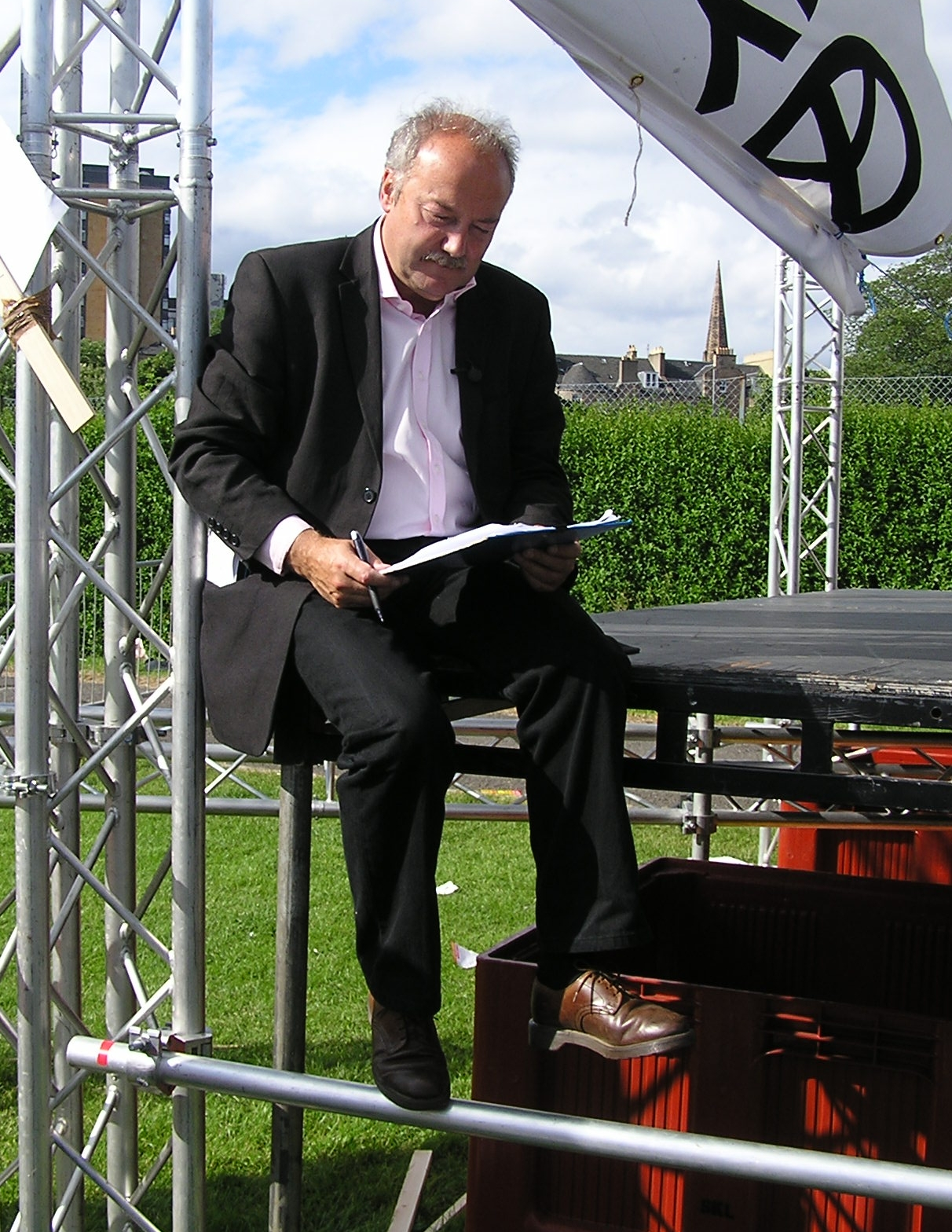
Galloway signing an asylum seekers petition, sitting on the edge of the StWC stage at the 2005 Make Poverty History rally.

Galloway told The Independent on Sunday in June 2012: "I am not a pacifist. I am a revolutionary. I am a Socialist who doesn't like Capitalism and who likes Imperialism less. ... I support the armed struggle where there is no alternative." In a 2002 interview with The Guardian, Galloway said he had supported the Soviet Union and said that its end was "the biggest catastrophe of my life". By 2013, he described himself on Twitter as "pro-Palestine, anti-war, pro-equality, anti-Islamophobia". In 2024, Galloway identified as socially conservative, and in 2025 he said he "no longer want[s] to hear [himself] described as a leftist", adding that "it now means liberalism, licence, ‘refugees welcome here’ and so on. All this is inimical to the interests of the working class".

Writing for The Guardian in 2024, Michael Chessum argued that Galloway's politics had shifted in the latter half of the 2010s, embracing Scottish unionism and social conservatism alongside more typically leftist positions, and highlighting the involvement of the socially conservative Communist Party of Great Britain (Marxist–Leninist) in the early years of the Workers Party. Chessum likened Galloway's political evolution to that of German politician Sahra Wagenknecht, a leading member of The Left who broke away to found her own eponymous political movement, and who similarly espouses socially conservative positions and anti-NATO views.

=== Social conservatism ===
Galloway once received an award from Stonewall and voted to lower the age of consent for homosexuality from 18 to 16. He voted in favour of allowing gay couples to marry in 2013, though he was absent for the third reading of the bill.

In 2024, Galloway said, "As a father of six children, I'm socially conservative." In May 2024, Momentum, an organisation supportive of the Labour Party, accused Galloway of "blatant homophobia and opposition to LGBT rights", after Galloway stated in an interview that he did not want children taught that "gay relationships are exactly the same and as normal as a mum, a dad and kids". Galloway said he wanted children taught that "the normal thing in Britain, in society across the world, is a mother, a father and a family". Michael Chessum of The Guardian described what he saw as Galloway's "opposition to transgender rights" while Sian Norris saw "transphobic dog-whistles", as well as "disinformation and conspiracist ideas" regarding transgender people. Galloway has complained in written articles – including for RT – of what he has called "transmania".

In 2004, Deborah Ross of The Independent gave Galloway an interview while the latter was driving, in which Galloway stated that he was "strongly against abortion. I believe life begins at conception, and therefore unborn babies have rights. I think abortion is immoral." Galloway reiterated his opposition to abortion in 2024, citing his Catholic faith.

Galloway said in 2005, "I have all my life been against abortion and against euthanasia". In 2024, Galloway reaffirmed his opposition to euthanasia in an interview with The Daily Telegraph's Tim Stanley.

=== Opposition to Israel and Zionism ===
Galloway is a staunch critic of Israel and of Zionism. He regards Israel as an apartheid state committing genocide against Palestinians. In 2013, he said "I don't recognise Israel and I don't debate with Israelis". The following year, he declared Bradford an "Israel-free zone".

During the 2008-2009 Gaza War, Galloway said in a speech at Trafalgar Square on 3 January 2009: "Today, the Palestinian people in Gaza are the new Warsaw Ghetto, and those who are murdering them are the equivalent of those who murdered the Jews in Warsaw in 1943". Jonathan Freedland in The Guardian commented that "the effect of repeating, again and again, that Israel is a Nazi state" was, potentially, an incitement to attack Jews because the comparison with Nazis as "the embodiment of evil" implies that "the only appropriate response is hate".

In an interview with the American radio host and conspiracy theorist Alex Jones in September 2005, Galloway said: "This is the thing about Zionism. It has nothing to do with Jewishness. Some of the biggest Zionists in the world are not Jews. These people have used Jewish people. ... They created the conditions in the Arab countries and in some European countries to stampede Jewish people out of the countries that they had been living in for many hundreds of years and stampede them into the Zionist state".

During an interview for Al Jazeera television on 17 November 2005, he said his election as MP earlier in the year was "despite all the efforts made by the British government, the Zionist movement and the newspapers and news media which are controlled by Zionism". In Trials of the Diaspora: A History of Anti-Semitism in England, Anthony Julius cites this interview as one example of Galloway pandering to the antisemitic prejudices of his audience. According to Julius, Galloway merely refers to the "right-wing press" in the British media, whereas he has the habit of adding the word "Zionist" when speaking on television in the Arab world. A few years later, in a May 2009 speech given at a meeting in Westminster, Galloway said: "I do not agree with the argument that there is a shadowy Jewish influence. Israel is doing what America wants it to do and to argue otherwise is to go down the dark tunnel of racist antisemitism".

Galloway criticised the British government's support of Israel during the Gaza war and condemned the genocide of Palestinians in the Gaza Strip. Galloway disputed reports from the Israeli government about the October 7 attacks. Specifically, he disputed the number of babies killed and suggested two-thirds of those killed were from the IDF. He also suggested that those who propagate the official Israeli government account of 7 October are "war criminals".

The Board of Deputies of British Jews, the largest Jewish community organisation in the UK, has called Galloway "a demagogue and conspiracy theorist". According to Jonathan Freedland writing in The Guardian, Galloway's critics have made an "unmerited charge ... that he is somehow uniquely guilty of exploiting the pain of Gaza for political gain".

=== Hezbollah and Hamas ===
At a 22 July 2006 demonstration (and later in a Socialist Worker op-ed), Galloway stated that "Hizbollah is not and has never been a terrorist organisation. It is the legitimate national resistance movement of Lebanon". He further said: "The invasion of Lebanon by Israel, for that's what it is, is a monstrous injustice. I side with the resistance to that injustice. Hizbollah is leading that resistance. ... I glorify the Hizbollah national resistance movement, and I glorify the leader of Hizbollah, Sayyed Hassan Nasrallah".

In 2009, Galloway received a Palestinian passport from Hamas leader Ismail Haniyeh. Hamas is designated as a terrorist organisation by Israel, the European Union, the United Kingdom, and the United States. He was denied entry into Canada on national security grounds, with Alykhan Velshi, then a spokesman for Jason Kenney, Canada's immigration minister, commenting: "We're going to uphold the law, not give special treatment to this infandous street-corner Cromwell who actually brags about giving 'financial support' to Hamas, a terrorist organisation banned in Canada." After a 2010 investigation into the actions of Velshi and other staffers in Kenney's office and into decisions made by bureaucrats prior to Galloway's visit, Justice Richard Mosley ruled that the government's decision to ban Galloway was politically motivated. A week after Mosley's ruling, Galloway travelled to Canada.

=== Iraq ===
In a March 2000 article in The Guardian, Galloway described himself as a supporter of the Iraqi people and the Ba'ath Party, but not Saddam Hussein himself.

In a House of Commons debate on 6 March 2002, Foreign Office minister Ben Bradshaw said Galloway was "not just an apologist, but a mouthpiece, for the Iraqi regime over many years." Galloway called the minister a liar and refused to withdraw on the grounds that Bradshaw's claim was "a clear imputation of dishonour", and the sitting was suspended due to the dispute. Bradshaw later withdrew his allegation, and Galloway apologised for using unparliamentary language.

Giving evidence in his libel case against The Daily Telegraph in 2004, Galloway testified that he regarded Saddam as a "bestial dictator" and would have welcomed his removal from power, but not by means of a military attack on Iraq. Galloway also pointed out that he was a prominent critic of Saddam Hussein's government in the 1980s, as well as of the role of Margaret Thatcher's government in supporting arms sales to Iraq during the Iran–Iraq War.

In his memoir I'm Not the Only One (2004), Galloway wrote:

"Just as Stalin industrialised the Soviet Union, so on a different scale Saddam plotted Iraq's own Great Leap Forward. ... He managed to keep his country together until 1991. Indeed, he is likely to have been the leader in history who came closest to creating a truly Iraqi national identity, and he developed Iraq and the living, health, social and education standards of his own people."

In the book, Galloway also expressed the opinion that Kuwait, which Iraq invaded, is "clearly a part of the greater Iraqi whole, stolen from the motherland by perfidious Albion". Christopher Hitchens responded that the state existed before Iraq had a name. The massacres of Kurds and Shias after the 1991 Gulf War, was according to Galloway, "a civil war that involved massive violence on both sides".

In 2006 a video surfaced showing Galloway greeting Uday Hussein, Saddam's eldest son, with the title of "Excellency", at Uday's palace in 1999. Galloway is heard saying he will be with Uday "until the end". Galloway continued to praise Iraq's prime minister under Saddam, Tariq Aziz. In April 2005, on Al Jazeera during that year's general election campaign, he described Aziz as "an eminent diplomatic and intellectual person". In his opinion, Aziz was "a political prisoner" and advocated his release.

After the Iraqi government was overthrown in the 2003 invasion of Iraq, Galloway defended Iraqi insurgents targeting Western forces. In August 2005, he praised them as "martyrs", condemned Iraqis who worked with the new security forces as "collaborators" and said it was "normal" for them to be the targets of suicide bombers. He said:

"These poor Iraqis – ragged people, with their sandals, with their Kalashnikovs, with the lightest and most basic of weapons – are writing the names of their cities and towns in the stars, with 145 military operations every day, which has made the country ungovernable. We don't know who they are, we don't know their names, we never saw their faces, they don't put up photographs of their martyrs, we don't know the names of their leaders".

Galloway was challenged by the BBC but denied making the "martyrs" comment.

Concerning the Iraq War, he said he would not rest "until Tony Blair is brought to justice", and in 2019 announced plans to try to prosecute Alastair Campbell.

=== Syria ===
==== Support for Bashar al-Assad ====
Galloway supported the Syrian occupation of Lebanon, telling the Lebanese Daily Star in August 2008: "Syrian troops in Lebanon maintain stability and protect the country from Israel". In the same article he expressed his opposition to United Nations Security Council Resolution 1559, which urged the Lebanese Government to establish control over all its territory. When Syria did withdraw from Lebanon, Galloway objected and said the occupation had been entirely "legal"; Christopher Hitchens, citing the Taif Accords of 1989, disputed his comment.

Referring to Syrian president Bashar al-Assad, Galloway said during a visit to the University of Damascus in November 2005: "For me he is the last Arab ruler, and Syria is the last Arab country. It is the fortress of the remaining dignity of the Arabs". He also called Assad a "breath of fresh air".

Galloway again praised the government of Assad in a leaked 2010 email to Assad's advisor Bouthaina Shaaban when asking for help in a Viva Palestina convoy, and reminded her of previous help from the Syrian government for the campaign. In the correspondence, leaked by the Anonymous hacking group, she responded: "God bless your amazing efforts and I will be honoured to be part and parcel of it". "I knew that I could rely on you and the last Arab country in this historic endeavour", Galloway wrote in response.

Galloway said in a July 2011 interview on Hezbollah's Al-Manar station: "Bashar Assad wants reform and change, to realise the aspirations of his people". In the early stages of the Syrian civil war, when Assad was reported as "perpetrating massacres of his own people", Galloway said Assad's opponents were "trying to pressure Syria and President Assad because of the good things that he did, such as supporting Palestinian and Lebanese resistance and rejecting to surrender to Israel".

==== Syrian civil war (2011–2024) ====
A month later, in an August 2011 piece for the Al Jazeera website, Galloway wrote he "was never close to the Syrian regime" and acknowledged its "authoritarian character, its police state mentality", and the "rampant" corruption "much of it concentrated around his [Assad's] own family". "I fully support the Syrian revolution", Galloway told Christopher Silvester in November 2012. "I want to see the end of all the dictatorships in the Middle East and I hope that it can be achieved peacefully. But if peaceful change is not possible, then violent change is inevitable. I wholly support the Syrian people's demands for democratic government. I just don't support armed intervention in Syria, any more than I supported it in any other country in the region".

In January 2013, Galloway criticised David Cameron's government for arming Syrian rebels linked to Salafi jihadism. Following the Ghouta chemical attack on 21 August 2013, Galloway speculated on his Press TV show that responsibility for the atrocity lay with al-Qaeda and the rebels in Syria who had been provided with the weapons by Israel. During his speech in the House of Commons debate about the crisis in Syria on 29 August 2013, Galloway was asked about this broadcast by the Conservative MP Matthew Offord. In the debate, Galloway stated "It is not that the regime is not bad enough to do it; everybody knows that it is bad enough to do it. The question is: is it mad enough to do it?".

In 2014, Galloway opposed Western military action against Islamic State, which he called a "death cult", and instead advocated military action from the regional powers. In 2016, he supported Russian military action against Islamic State, saying: "I support the decision of the Russian government to come to the aid of the government in Syria because whatever faults it [the Syrian government] may have, whatever crimes it has committed, they are considerably fewer than the crimes committed by IS or would be committed by IS were they to come to power".

=== Support for the Iranian government ===
Galloway has worked for the Iranian state-run satellite television channel Press TV since 2008. During an event at the London School of Economics in March 2011, he said: "Because I don't believe that the government of Iran is a dictatorship I have no problem about working for Press TV in London which is a British owned television station. I'm not responsible for the government of Ahmedinejad. I'm not responsible for the leadership of Press TV". Galloway also said: "There are many things wrong with Iran. One thing they do have is elections. They elected a president that you or I might not have voted for but I am in no doubt that Ahmadinejad won the presidential election" held in 2009. (See Television presenter below.)

In March 2008, Galloway said that the issue of gay rights in Iran was being misused by supporters of war against Iran. He said on The Wright Stuff chat show that the executed boyfriend of gay Iranian asylum seeker Mehdi Kazemi was executed for "sex crimes" rather than for being gay.

Scott Long, writing in The Guardian on 31 March, criticised Galloway's claim that "homosexuals are not executed in Iran, just rapists," pointing out that current law in the country stipulates that "Penetrative sex acts between men can bring death on the first conviction." Gay rights activist Peter Tatchell, writing in The Guardian on 26 March, wrote that Galloway's "passionate opposition to a war against Iran, which I share, seems to have clouded his judgement" and "his claim that lesbian and gay people are not at risk of execution in Iran is refuted by every reputable human rights organisation, including Amnesty International, Human Rights Watch, the International Gay and Lesbian Human Rights Commission and the International Lesbian and Gay Association".

In August 2010, on his Press TV programme The Real Deal, Galloway interviewed President Mahmoud Ahmadinejad, following Galloway's participation in a conference for expatriate Iranians whose expenses were paid by Iran's government. He discussed Sakineh Mohammadi Ashtiani, an Iranian woman convicted of adultery and sentenced to stoning, which he described as "the so-called stoning case". Galloway said of Ashtiani's sentence: "Every so often an issue comes along which is seized upon by the enemies of Iran and it becomes a heavy problem and magnified ...".

According to Martin Fletcher in The Times, Ahmadinejad gave "mendacious answers" which "went unchallenged by his obsequious interlocutor". Galloway told Ahmadinejad: "I have police protection in London from the Iranian opposition because of my support for your election campaign" in 2009. "I mention this so you know where I'm coming from."

In May 2025, Galloway was awarded the Ismail Haniyeh Prize at the Iranian state-organized Sobh International Media Festival, named after the assassinated former chairman of Hamas. In his acceptance speech, he praised Iranian Supreme Leader Ali Khamenei, stating: "I thank the revolutionary people of Iran, your leadership, your heroes, and your martyrs for standing firm in support of the Palestinian people."

=== Scottish independence ===
Galloway had long supported devolution for Scotland, but opposed Scottish independence. In the run-up to the Scottish independence referendum, held on 18 September 2014, Galloway was dismissive of the official Better Together campaign because it also involved Conservatives and Liberal Democrats, and he believed its leader, Alistair Darling, to be ineffective. "My case isn't that Scotland couldn't be independent, but shouldn't", The Sunday Times quoted him as saying. He was among 200 public figures to sign a letter to The Guardian opposing independence in the run up to the referendum.

Galloway's argument against independence was based on "class" over "nationality". He told Serena Kutchinsky in an interview for Prospect magazine: "If we lose this vote the possibility of a real Labour government, or any kind of Labour government, in the rest of UK will be gone".

In 2013, Galloway began a series of public meetings in Scotland, using the slogan "Just Say Naw" to independence. On 11 September 2014, Galloway took part in Scotland Decides: The Big, Big Debate, an independence debate held in Glasgow and broadcast by the BBC during the evening.

In July 2020, Galloway co-founded and established a cross-party Scottish unionist political coalition called Alliance 4 Unity (later re-named All for Unity). Its goal was to defeat the Scottish National Party and Scottish nationalism in general at the 2021 Scottish Parliament election, by tactical voting for any Scottish unionist candidates in the proportional vote on each Scottish electoral regions. During the election campaign Galloway was criticised for "race-baiting" comments about the then Cabinet Secretary for Justice Humza Yousaf, about who he tweeted "Well #Humza you're not more Scottish than me. You're not a Celt like me."

In June 2025, Galloway announced his support for a second referendum, adding that it is the 'right of Scots to self-determination.'

In March 2026, Galloway announced his shift to support Scottish independence.

=== European Union ===
In 2014, Galloway said he would "be campaigning to remain in the European Union, as anyone with any brain cells will also be doing".

However, in 2016, he began campaigning for the UK to leave the EU. At a rally at the Queen Elizabeth II Conference Centre on 19 February 2016, Galloway endorsed the Grassroots Out (GO) campaign for the European Union membership referendum. He was introduced by UKIP leader Nigel Farage as a "special guest" who is "without doubt one of the greatest orators in this country, he is a towering figure on the left of British politics". Galloway's presence at the rally prompted some of those present to leave. Labour MP Kate Hoey, who was involved with GO, defended Galloway's participation. "George ended up getting a hugely favourable response to what he said". Responding to criticism of his association with Farage, Galloway tweeted: "We are not pals. We are allies in one cause. Like Churchill and Stalin".

On 17 April 2019 Galloway announced he would support the Brexit Party led by Nigel Farage in the May 2019 European Parliament election. He said that "given the nature of Labour's Euro-fanatic candidates list and the crucial juncture we have reached in the fight for the full implementation of the Brexit referendum result and for one-time only I will be supporting Nigel Farage in next months elections."

=== Russia and Ukraine ===
From 2013 to 2022 Galloway was a presenter on the Russian state-controlled television network RT.

Galloway called the 2014 Ukrainian Revolution a Western-backed "coup" and a "foreign financed invasion of the sovereignty of Ukraine". He believes Russia's annexation of Crimea was legitimate, because he said the disputed 2014 Crimean status referendum showed that "the huge majority of people in Crimea wanted to leave Ukraine".

In a 2016 interview of Nigel Farage, Galloway said "I respect Putin and I think he's very popular in Russia".

When Russian opposition leader Alexei Navalny was poisoned in August 2020, Galloway claimed on RT that Navalny was a white supremacist.

In early 2022, Galloway dismissed claims that Russia was about to invade Ukraine, writing "I told you it wasn't. You were wrong. I was right". When Russia invaded Ukraine ten days later, he said the invasion was "not what I wanted", but he blamed the invasion on "the West" and accused it of "Pumping Ukraine full of NATO weapons, mercenaries and propaganda". He suggested that the Bucha massacre was staged. Galloway was accused of being an apologist and propagandist for Russian president Vladimir Putin by the larger political parties. Jamie Blackett ended their political alliance All for Unity over their disagreement on Ukraine. The Scottish Liberal Democrats leader, Alex Cole-Hamilton, called Galloway "an apologist for Russian expansionist aggression" and said that Galloway's "association with RT has lent legitimacy and influence to the propaganda apparatus of a hostile power".

In October 2023, Galloway promoted the false claim that Volodymyr Zelenskyy's wife Olena Zelenska had spent $1 million on jewelry in New York City, during the time of which Zelenska was actually in Canada. Galloway said that his source for the story was The Nation, but the publication that had actually reported this claim was a Nigerian newspaper of the same name. Regarding the Crocus City Hall attack in Russia, Galloway said he had "four pieces of evidence that lead [him] to believe that the United States, its NATO allies, and their puppet stump state Ukraine are, in fact, responsible for this massacre".

In October 2024, at the 16th BRICS summit, Galloway criticised the British press at the event for "hating Russia" and suggested there was more media freedom in Russia than in Britain. In June 2025, Galloway participated as a speaker at the Forum of the Future 2050 in Moscow, a conference organised by tycoon Konstantin Malofeev. The guest list also included Elon Musk's father, Errol Musk, Russia's foreign minister Sergey Lavrov, economist Jeffrey Sachs and conspiracy theorist Alex Jones, among others.

After going into self-imposed exile in Russia, Galloway said on his talk show that he supports Russia's war against Ukraine, calling it anti-imperialist and anti-colonialist. He praised Russia's military after it struck Yahodyn, on the Polish border, with a drone.

=== China and North Korea ===
In 2019, Galloway defended the authorities' crackdown on protests in Hong Kong. He told China Global Television Network: "These people should know that Hong Kong is China. No country, absolutely no country, will allow an existential threat to emerge on its territory".

In 2022, he said there were no internment camps for Uighurs in China. He stated that China had established "re-education centres" to steer terrorists away from the path of extremism.

Galloway said, after spending time in North Korea, he "does not agree with the North Korean system" and would not like to live there. He said "there have been achievements in North Korea ... They have a cohesive, pristine actually, innocent culture, a culture not penetrated by globalisation and Western mores". During a period of tension between North and South Korea in 2013, Galloway said "North Korea has no intention to harm any of us. North Korea's problem is with South Korea. ... South Korea exists because America invaded Korea, killed millions of people, divided the country and continues to garrison South Korea with military bases, nuclear weapons, chemical and biological weapon". He blamed the United States for "war mongering" during the crisis and called South Korea its "puppet state".

=== Latin America ===
He has been an advocate for the Venezuelan government of Hugo Chávez and, in his Fidel Castro Handbook, for the former Cuban leader. "You were the greatest man I ever met Comandante Fidel. You were the man of the century", he tweeted when Castro died in November 2016.

=== Saudi Arabia ===
Galloway has criticised Britain's close ties with Saudi Arabia and British involvement in the Saudi Arabian-led intervention in Yemen. In 2017, he said: "It is a country with no democracy or freedom of any kind. It is a country that exports terrorism around the world and funds terrorism and extremism around the world. We should have nothing whatsoever to do with them."

=== India ===
Galloway opposes India's role in the Kashmir conflict with Pakistan, and has voiced support for the insurgency in Indian-administered Kashmir. He said the Indian Prime Minister Narendra Modi "has blood on his hands". Modi was accused of initiating and condoning the 2002 Gujarat riots against India's Muslim minority.

== Defamation cases ==
=== Allegations and lawsuit against the Mirror Group ===
In October 1991, Galloway tabled a motion in the House of Commons expressing concern at the allegations against news publisher Mirror Group Newspapers put forward in Seymour Hersh's recently published book, The Samson Option: Israel's Nuclear Arsenal and American Foreign Policy. Hersh alleged that the Daily Mirror's foreign editor, Nicholas Davies, was involved in weapons sales to Iran and had given the whereabouts of Mordechai Vanunu to Mossad. Mossad sought to capture Vanunu due to his role as a whistleblower of Israeli nuclear operations, and later "lured [him] out of Britain to Italy", where he "was kidnapped, drugged and returned to Israel". Galloway's motion also called upon Mirror Group's owner, Robert Maxwell, to appoint a tribunal to investigate the allegations and the potential involvement of foreign intelligence in the publishing group. As the motion was signed under parliamentary privilege, other news outlets could report on it without worrying about legal repercussion, as Maxwell was known for litigiousness. Following this, the Daily Mirror published a "vitriolic" front-page editorial against Galloway, accusing him of abusing parliamentary privilege and of being motivated by links to anti-Israel terrorist groups. Galloway sued for libel and was awarded a public apology and substantial undisclosed damages from the Mirror Group.

=== Daily Telegraph libel case ===
On 22 April 2003, The Daily Telegraph published news articles and comment describing documents found by its reporter David Blair in the ruins of the Iraqi Foreign Ministry. The documents purported to be records of meetings between Galloway and Iraqi intelligence agents, and they stated that he had received £375,000 per year from the proceeds of the Oil-for-Food Programme. Galloway sued the newspaper for libel by November 2003, and the case was heard in the High Court on 14 November 2004.

On 2 December, Justice David Eady ruled that the story had been "seriously defamatory", and that The Daily Telegraph was "obliged to compensate Mr Galloway ... and to make an award for the purposes of restoring his reputation." Galloway was awarded damages of £150,000 plus, after a failed appeal in 2006, legal costs of about £2 million.

Both sides regarded the libel case as an important test of the Reynolds qualified-privilege defence. The Daily Telegraph did not attempt to claim justification (where the defendant seeks to prove the truth of the defamatory reports): "It has never been the Telegraph's case to suggest that the allegations contained in these documents are true". The newspaper argued that it acted responsibly as the allegations it reported were of sufficient public interest to outweigh the damage caused to Galloway's reputation. The trial judge did not accept this defence, noting that comments such as Galloway being guilty of "treason", "in Saddam's pay", and being "Saddam's little helper" caused him [the judge] to conclude that "the newspaper was not neutral but both embraced the allegations with relish and fervour and went on to embellish them"; additionally, the judge ruled, Galloway had not been given a fair or reasonable opportunity to make inquiries or meaningful comment upon the documents before they were published.

=== Christian Science Monitor libel case ===
The Christian Science Monitor also published a story on 25 April 2003, stating that it had documentary evidence that he had received "more than ten million dollars" from the Iraqi government. On 20 June 2003, the Monitor reported that its own investigation had concluded that the documents were sophisticated forgeries. Galloway sued The Christian Science Monitor for libel. In March 2004, he accepted damages and a public apology from the Monitor.

=== Jcom radio libel case ===
In November 2007, Jewish radio station Jcom aired a satirical segment in which a character named 'Georgie Galloway' used the anti-Semitic catchphrase "kill the Jews, kill the Jews". Galloway sued the station for libel and won the case in the High Court. Galloway was awarded £15,000 in damages and around £5,000 in costs. The radio station closed after losing the case. Galloway said the judgment had "categorically crushed the slur of anti-Semitism" against him.

=== BBC Question Time appearance ===
On 5 February 2015, Galloway appeared on BBC's Question Time discussion programme, recorded in Finchley, London, within a constituency with Britain's largest Jewish community. The Jewish Chronicle wrote that "Galloway was heckled by Jewish audience members who challenged him on his anti-Israel record" and the audience shouted "You're not welcome here".

Five days later, Hadley Freeman, a columnist for The Guardian, tweeted: "Galloway has said and done things that cross the line from anti-Israel to antisemitic". Galloway said that he would issue a suit for defamation against her. Freeman then deleted the tweet.

Some who had re-tweeted Freeman's comment were then sent a letter from Chambers Solicitors, acting for Galloway, asking for an apology and £5,000 plus Value Added Tax (then levied at 20%) to cover costs incurred by the letter. Some people who received the letter complained to the Solicitors Regulation Authority. Eric Heinze, Professor of Law at Queen Mary University of London, noted that an editor of the Media Lens website had sent a tweet to Freeman asking if she could provide evidence for her claim that Galloway is antisemitic. Heinze wrote that "any example she could cite would probably persuade some and not others. Even if an overwhelming majority were unpersuaded, a highly popular opinion does not create an objectively verifiable fact." Chambers Solicitors' conduct was the subject of a warning from the SRA a year later. Initiating a libel action must begin within a year and no formal writ was issued.

=== Aisha Ali-Khan libel case ===
On 20 June 2016, Galloway lost a libel action brought by Aisha Ali-Khan, his assistant for six months in 2012. He had claimed that she had pursued a "dirty tricks" campaign against him and the Respect Party, and had slept at his house with her then-husband. The case was heard in the High Court. His counsel apologised on Galloway's behalf, and accepted that he had made "defamatory accusations". Ali-Khan will receive a "five-figure sum" in damages and her legal costs. As part of the settlement of their libel claim, both Galloway and Ali-Khan gave undertakings not to make any further public statement about the litigation or to defame each other. In 2018 Galloway brought an action that Ali-Khan had breached this undertaking 26 times, which Ali-Khan admitted, and in April 2018 the High Court imprisoned Ali-Khan for 12 weeks for contempt of court, describing her action as "deliberate, flagrant, persistent and inexcusable". Ali-Khan had been found guilty of contempt of court on a previous occasion. Previously, during 2017, Ali-Khan had filed a petition for Galloway's bankruptcy.

=== Twitter defamation case ===
In April 2022, Galloway's Twitter account was labelled "Russian state-affiliated media" by Twitter. In response Galloway tweeted: "I work for NO Russian media. I have 400,000 followers. I'm the leader of a British political party and spent nearly 30 years in the British parliament. If you do not remove this designation I will take legal action." Twitter users pointed out that Galloway's profile named the Russian state media outlets that he worked for. Galloway then removed these from his profile. He said Twitter had refused to explain the label, which he said was added to his account after he had stopped presenting on Russian television channels, which were closed by the British government in March 2022. Galloway sued Twitter for defamation in the High Court, Dublin. The suit also alleged that Twitter had unlawfully processed his personal data by labelling and censoring his account. In October 2024, the High Court in Dublin ordered Twitter to pay Galloway's legal costs. It also ordered both parties to "submit sworn affidavits attesting to the truth of their claims" by 30 January 2025.

== Elections contested ==
=== UK Parliament elections ===
Date	Constituency	Party	Votes	% votes	Position
1987 general election	Glasgow Hillhead	Labour	17,958	42.9	Won
1992 general election	Glasgow Hillhead	Labour	15,148	38.5	Won
1997 general election	Glasgow Kelvin	Labour	16,643	51.0	Won
2001 general election	Glasgow Kelvin	Labour	12,014	44.8	Won
2005 general election	Bethnal Green and Bow	Respect	15,801	35.9	Won
2010 general election	Poplar and Limehouse	Respect	8,160	17.5	3rd
2012 Bradford West by-election	Bradford West	Respect	18,341	55.9	Won
2015 general election	Bradford West	Respect	8,557	21.2	2nd
2017 general election	Manchester Gorton	Independent	2,615	5.7	3rd
2019 general election	West Bromwich East	Independent	489	1.4	6th
2021 Batley and Spen by-election	Batley and Spen	Workers Party	8,264	21.87	3rd
2024 Rochdale by-election	Rochdale	Workers Party	12,335	39.65	Won
2024 general election	Rochdale	Workers Party	11,587	29.2	2nd
2026 Holborn and St Pancras by-election	Holborn and St Pancras	Workers Party	314	1.1	7th

=== London mayoral elections ===
Date	Party	Votes	% votes	Position
2016 London mayoral election	Respect	37,007	1.4	7th

=== Scottish Parliament elections ===
Date	Region	Party	Votes	% votes	Position
2011 Scottish Parliament election	Glasgow	Respect	6,972	3.3	5th
2021 Scottish Parliament election	South Scotland	All for Unity	5,521	1.5	6th
2026 Scottish Parliament election	Glasgow	Workers Party			

== Television presenter ==
In an overview of the broadcasting organisations Galloway works for, Tom Rogan in the National Review in April 2014 described him as being "a Western puppet for tyranny's propagandists".

In August 2009, editions of Galloway's programmes The Real Deal and Comment programme for Press TV, a London-based news channel controlled by the government of Iran, were found by the British broadcasting regulator Ofcom to have breached its broadcasting code on impartiality.

After Press TV lost its Ofcom licence in 2012, according to Galloway, the Iranian broadcaster owed him £40,000, leading to his company Miranda Media entering compulsory liquidation in 2013 because of unpaid tax. Reportedly, the owed payment amounts to £100,000, although Galloway disputed this in February 2016. Miranda Media, in which income from Galloway's media work was deposited, was established in September 2007 under a month before a law came into force allowing directors to receive loans from their own companies, a facility Galloway used on multiple occasions.

Shortly after its foundation in June 2012, Galloway became a presenter with the Al Mayadeen television station where he presents "Kalima Hurra" (Arabic: كلمة حرّة meaning free word). Al Mayadeen reportedly has connections with Iran and the Assad government in Syria, and has been accused of supporting the Assad government, a claim Galloway has rejected.

In November 2013, Galloway and his wife Gayatri began to present Sputnik for the Russian government-backed station RT. He is a regular contributor to RT's other programming. Among the notable guests on Galloway's RT programmes have been Gilad Atzmon, and Shlomo Sand.

In the register of members' financial interests published at the end of January 2015, Galloway disclosed that he had earned £293,450 from his television broadcasting in the previous year and had received almost £70,000 in travelling expenses and hotel stays. For the period November 2013 to February 2015, Galloway was paid £100,000 for his appearances on RT, the highest payment to any British politician working for the channel.

In 2016, Galloway presented a documentary film, The Killing$ of Tony Blair.

== Radio presenter ==
Having broadcast on talkSPORT from 2006 to 2012, Galloway began to broadcast on talkRADIO (which launched in March 2016 as a sister station to Talksport) in June 2016. Amongst his many monologues, he said that if Scotland were to leave the UK and join the EU "it would not be a good thing for his fellow countrymen", and has condemned the BBC as a "national disgrace".

In June 2019, after Liverpool Football Club had defeated Tottenham Hotspur Football Club in the Champions League final, Galloway congratulated the people of Liverpool and tweeted "No #Israël [sic] flags on the Cup!". He said that this referred to a number of Tottenham fans who were flying the flag of Israel in the crowd, showing "an affiliation to a 'racist state'". Tottenham Hotspur accused Galloway of "blatant anti-Semitism" and talkRADIO sacked him saying the broadcaster "does not tolerate anti-Semitic views".

== Personal life ==
Galloway is known for wearing a fedora hat. In a 2019 tweet, he said that he wears the hat to cover scars that he received in the 2014 Notting Hill attack.

As of 2024, Galloway owned a residential property in Portugal.

=== Marriages and children ===
Galloway has been married four times and has six children.

In 1979, he married Elaine Fyffe, with whom he has a daughter. The couple separated in 1987 and divorced in 1999. In 1994, Galloway married Amineh Abu-Zayyad, a Palestinian biologist, in a non-legally binding Islamic ceremony; a legally binding civil ceremony followed in March 2000. Abu-Zayyad was granted a divorce in February 2009, after an estrangement of several years, on the grounds of "unreasonable behaviour"; her petition was not contested. Galloway married Rima Husseini, his former researcher, in a non-legally binding Islamic ceremony in 2005. Galloway had two sons with Husseini, who is from Lebanon. On 31 March 2012 he married his fourth wife, the Dutch–Indonesian anthropologist Putri Gayatri Pertiwi, then 27, in Amsterdam. The initial event was followed by a traditional Javanese wedding ceremony in Sumatra and a civil marriage at the House of Commons in September 2012. Pertiwi worked as a consultant for a Dutch research firm and as a co-presenter of Galloway's TV show Sputnik. The couple have three children.

=== Religion ===
Galloway has been outspoken in support of religious liberties. Though he has long stated that his religious beliefs are a private matter, Galloway was raised, and in 2016, said that he was a Roman Catholic Christian. In a 2013 interview, Galloway sparked controversy for saying as a Roman Catholic, he would not feel safe in an independent Scotland given the historically bigoted views harboured by many Scottish nationalists towards Catholics.

At a 2012 rally, he said: "We stand for justice and haqq" and "A Muslim is somebody who is not afraid of earthly power but who fears only the Judgment Day. I'm ready for that, I'm working for that and it's the only thing I fear." In April 2012 Jemima Khan claimed Galloway had converted to Islam around 2000 and that his shahadah was performed in Kilburn, London. Galloway denied the claims, saying: "I have never attended any such ceremony in Kilburn, Karachi or Kathmandu. It is simply and categorically untrue." He went on to reiterate his position that religious beliefs are a "personal matter". His marriages to Dr Abu-Zayyad in 1994 and Rima Husseini in 2007 both took place in Muslim ceremonies. His wife since 2012, Putri Gayatri Pertiwi, is also Muslim.

In March 2024, Galloway was sworn-in as an MP holding a copy of the Bible. In a Good Morning Britain interview, in April of the same year, Galloway stated he was "a practicing Roman Catholic".

== Sources ==
- House of Commons Committee on Standards and Privileges (2007), Conduct of Mr George Galloway: Sixth Report of Session 2006–07 (PDF), vol. II, London: The Stationery Office
- Morley, David (2007a), Gorgeous George: The Life and Adventures of George Galloway, Politico's Publishing, ISBN 9781842751855

Parliament of the United Kingdom
Preceded by Roy Jenkins	Member of Parliament for Glasgow Hillhead; 1987–1997	Constituency abolished
New constituency	Member of Parliament for Glasgow Kelvin; 1997–2005	Constituency abolished
Preceded by Oona King	Member of Parliament for Bethnal Green and Bow; 2005–2010	Succeeded by Rushanara Ali
Preceded by Marsha Singh	Member of Parliament for Bradford West; 2012–2015	Succeeded by Naz Shah
Preceded by Tony Lloyd	Member of Parliament for Rochdale; 2024	Succeeded by Paul Waugh
Party political offices
Preceded by Arshad Ali	Leader of the Respect Party; 2013–2016	Party dissolved
New political party	Leader of the Workers Party of Britain; 2019–present	Incumbent
