= Fidel Castro Handbook =

Book by George Galloway

- Author: George Galloway
- Language: English
- Subjects: Cuban revolution, Cuban politics, Fidel Castro
- Published: London
- Publisher: MQ Publications
- Publication date: 2006
- Publication place: United Kingdom
- Pages: 429
- ISBN: 9781840726886
- Dewey Decimal: 972.91064092

Fidel Castro Handbook is a 2006 book by British politician George Galloway. Galloway describes himself as "a partisan for Cuba, for the revolution, for the leadership'". The book details a history of Cuba since the revolution and the progress made despite sanctions from the United States. The book was launched at Portcullis House, Westminster, London.

== Reception ==
Whilst the book received some praise on the left it was criticised by the Trotskyist outlet Workers' Liberty for being "a hagiography about one of the last grand Stalinist autocrats by one of its most loquacious apologists". According to John Harris of The Guardian, the book is evidence of Galloway's "singular politics". Ramona Wadi wrote in Green Left that "[t]he book shows Castro’s capacity to explain and defend the revolution using a brilliant memory and insight into the havoc caused by capitalism and globalisation on Third World countries".
