= The Mother of All Talk Shows =

International talk radio show

- Title card (2023)
- Other names: MOATS
- Genre: Political discussion and phone-in
- Country of origin: UK
- Language: English
- Home station: YouTube (2022–present); Radio Sputnik (2019–2022) talkRADIO (2016–2019); Talksport (2006–2010)
- Hosted by: George Galloway
- Recording studio: China
- No. of episodes: 570 ongoing

The Mother of All Talk Shows is an international talk radio-style show hosted by British broadcaster and politician George Galloway on YouTube and other social media platforms. The show airs on Sundays and Weekends.

The show formerly aired on talkRADIO, a British commercial radio station owned by Wireless Group. The programme aired every Friday between 7pm and 10pm. The original show aired each Friday and Saturday night between 10pm and 1am from March 2006 and March 2010 on talkRADIO's parent station, Talksport.

== History ==
=== talkSPORT ===
On 11 March 2006, Galloway began his radio show on Talksport, and two weeks later started a simultaneous broadcast on Talk 107, Talksport's Edinburgh-based sister station. It was billed as The Mother of All Talk Shows. Galloway chose to begin every radio broadcast with the theme from the Top Cat cartoon series (an allusion to his January 2006 humorous impersonation of a cat fed milk by actress Rula Lenska on Channel 5's Celebrity Big Brother), followed by an extempore monologue by himself, dealing primarily with political issues, economics, international relations, political philosophy, and other topical issues. The show's title refers to Saddam Hussein's remark that the Gulf War was "the mother of all battles". Galloway made an implicit allusion to Hussein's remark at the U.S. Senate "Oil for Food" hearing in May 2005, when he called the hearing "the mother of all smokescreens".

After the opening monologue, Galloway invited callers to challenge his views, with a preference for those who disagree with him and women callers. Galloway occasionally called his program The Great Debate and is different from other talk show hosts in that he willingly and ably debated hostile callers and encouraged those who strongly disagreed with him to call "come and have a go if you think you’re hard enough".

In June 2009, broadcasting regulator Ofcom said that several episodes of Galloway's Talksport programme between November 2008 and January 2009 had broken its guidelines by moving away from a debating format "to campaign on a major matter of controversy", because Galloway had called on listeners to join demonstrations against Israel because of the Gaza War. Ofcom rejected complaints that the programmes concerned had failed to observe its impartiality rules.

Galloway stopped presenting the show on 27 March 2010, due to campaign commitments in the 2010 UK general election. In August 2010, he returned to the station with a new show in a similar format, but titled The Week with George Galloway, described by the station as a "no-holds barred review of the past seven days around the world." The end of this programme was announced in March 2012 in common with the dropping of all the non-sport elements of its schedule at the beginning of April.

=== talkRADIO ===
Galloway began to broadcast on talkRADIO (which launched in March 2016 as a sister station to Talksport) after the 2016 London mayoral election. The first programme was broadcast in the evening of 24 June 2016, and the last on 17 May 2019.

The show was cancelled by talkRADIO on 3 June 2019 following an allegedly anti-Semitic tweet Galloway made a few days prior. After Liverpool beat Tottenham Hotspur in the 2019 Champions League Final, Galloway tweeted, "Congratulations to the great people of #Liverpool to the memory of the socialist miner #BillShankley [sic] to the fallen #96 to those who fought for justice for them and to the Liverpool dockers. No #Israël flags on the Cup!".

=== Sputnik ===
Following the cancellation, the show moved to Radio Sputnik. It ran there until March 2022, when sanctions over the Russian invasion of Ukraine cut off Russian state media in many other countries.

=== YouTube ===
As of 2026, the show is recorded in China and broadcast on Galloway's YouTube and other social media channels.
