= Mariam Appeal =

1998–2003 British political campaign

The Mariam Appeal ("the Appeal") was a political campaign in the United Kingdom (UK) established in 1998 which ceased operation in 2003. The objects of the Appeal as stated in its constitution were "to provide medicines, medical equipment and medical assistance to the people of Iraq; to highlight the causes and results of the cancer epidemic in Iraq and to arrange for the medical treatment of a number of Iraqi children outside Iraq". The campaign was founded by the politician George Galloway, then a member of parliament. Princess Sarvath, wife of then Crown Prince Hassan of Jordan, was patron of the Appeal.

The Mariam Appeal was intended "to campaign against sanctions on Iraq which are having disastrous effects on the ordinary people of Iraq." The campaign was named after Mariam Hamza, a child flown by the fund from Iraq to Britain to receive treatment for leukaemia. The intention was to raise awareness of the suffering and death of tens of thousands of other Iraqi children due to poor health conditions and lack of suitable medicines and facilities, and to campaign for the lifting of the sanctions seen by many as a direct cause of those problems.

Among the activities undertaken was a daily newsletter on sanctions, a sanctions-busting flight to Baghdad, the Big Ben to Baghdad trip in a red London bus, meetings and conferences, the projection of an anti-war slogan on the House of Commons, and the facilitating of trips to Iraq by dozens of journalists.

== Investigations ==
The fund received scrutiny during the 2003 invasion of Iraq, after a complaint to the office of the Attorney General for England and Wales that Galloway used some of the donation money to pay his travel expenses. Galloway, however, denied that he had misused any funds raised for the Mariam Appeal and pointed out that it was reasonable for money from a campaign fund to be used to pay for the travel expenses of campaigners. Over the next four years Galloway faced several investigations related to the Appeal including the Oil-for-Food Program Hearings.

=== Charity Commission investigations ===
The Mariam Appeal was investigated by the Charity Commission on more than one occasion. Although the Appeal was not a registered charity, the commission had jurisdiction to take action on funds raised in England and Wales on charitable grounds. The report of the first, year-long, inquiry was published in June 2004.

The Charity Commission took the view that the political activities of the Appeal were ancillary to the charitable purposes of the Appeal and that the Trustees could reasonably have formed the view that this would have the impact of enabling treatment for sick children. The Commission found that the Appeal had done charitable work and raised significant funds, so should have registered with them and published accounts, taking the view that the legal advice the Appeal founders had taken that the constitution did not create a charity was wrong. It established that Dr. Amineh Abu-Zayyad, a Palestinian, who was married to Galloway between 2000 and 2005, had received unauthorised benefits in the form of salary payments from the Appeal's funds, although the executive committee considered these payments necessary and were unaware that they were unauthorised.

The Charity Commission did not find other evidence to support the allegations that funds had been misused. Examination of the Appeal's bank accounts revealed the major funders to be the United Arab Emirates, a donor from Saudi Arabia and the Jordanian businessman Fawaz Zureikat (later alleged to be implicated in the Oil-for-Food Programme scandal). Some of the Appeal's books and records had been sent to Amman and Baghdad in 2001 when Fawaz Zuriekat took over as Chairman of the Appeal and could not now be located. The Appeal had not produced annual profit and loss accounts or balance sheets.

As the Appeal was by this time closed, full records were unavailable, that the founders believed on legal advice that they had not created a charity, and there was no evidence that the funds of the Appeal were misapplied (other than for salaries), the Charity Commission decided to take no further action other than informing the Trustees of their mistakes.

A further Charity Commission Report published on 7 June 2007 found that the Appeal had received funds from Fawaz Zureikat that originated from the Oil For Food programme.

=== House of Commons Investigation ===
The UK Parliament's Standards Commissioner launched a four-year investigation independently of the Charity Commission, but with its involvement.

At a press conference following publication of the report, Galloway stated "To be deprived of the company for 18 days of the honourable ladies and gentleman behind me [in parliament] will be painful ... but I'm intending to struggle on regardless ... What really upset them [the committee] is that I always defend myself.

== Later developments ==
It was claimed in June 2017, after a request under the Freedom of Information Act by The Times newspaper that Galloway's then wife Dr. Amineh Abu-Zayyad had received £84,000 in salary and expenses from the appeal after being appointed as its medical and scientific officer without any appropriate process and without a contract of employment. The Yorkhill NHS Trust in Glasgow received £54,000 drawn from the appeal in partial payment for the care of Mariam Hamza herself. Both Galloway, who claimed £3,000 in travel expenses, and his wife were trustees of the charity. Legally, The Times Dominic Kennedy wrote, a person in such a position of trust is not permitted to benefit financially without proper authorisation.
