= Fawaz Zureikat =

Fawaz Abdullah Zureikat (also known as Zuraiqat or Zurayqat' born 1955 – died c. 2010) was a Jordanian businessman. Zureikat was implicated in the United Nations Oil-for-Food scandal relating to corruption surrounding Iraq's oil exports.

== Business ==
In the 2004 Duelfer Report, Zureikat was identified as receiving oil allocations from Iraq via Middle East Semi Conductors Co. In other documents, another company called Aredio Petroleum was also linked to Zureikat. He had been doing business in Iraq since 1986, and his brother Hatem has been a political prisoner in Syria since 1981. Hatem who once shared a cell with Tariq Aziz.

For a time, he was station manager of Arab Television (ATV), a short-lived English-language satellite channel with offices in London and Baghdad which filmed and distributed the worldwide rights to the pre-Iraq War interview conducted in Baghdad between Tony Benn and Saddam Hussein.

He was also a member of the National Mobilization Committee for the Defense of Iraq (NMCDI), based in Jordan, and a passionate opponent of sanctions on Iraq. He was arrested on 3 March 2003, in Amman by The Jordanian intelligence services, along with other prominent businessmen who had financial links with Saddam Hussein's regime.

Zureikat was a donor to the Mariam Appeal, founded by the British politician George Galloway. He donated approximately £375,000 to the appeal and acted as its chairman for a period of time around 2001. In 2005, Zurikat was accused of siphoning money from the United Nations' Oil for Food Program to donate to the Mariam Appeal. The United States Senate also accused him of giving oil direct to Galloway. Testifying at the Oil-for-Food Program Hearings before the Senate, Galloway denied having received anything personally from Zureikat as a result of any oil deal and stated the contributions for the Mariam Appeal came from Zureikat's business dealings in Iraq.
