= Lifeline 3 =

2006 aid convoy from Britain to the Gaza Strip

Lifeline 3, officially Viva Palestina — a lifeline to Gaza, 3 was a convoy carrying humanitarian aid, solidarity, and a political message. It was led by George Galloway (a Respect Party politician) and Viva Palestina, a British charity. It travelled from the United Kingdom to the Gaza Strip during the winter of 2009–10, collecting volunteers and vehicles from other countries along the way, notably Turkey, due to the IHH (İnsani Yardım Vakfı) organisation. The Gaza Strip has been blockaded by Israel and Egypt since 2007, when Hamas took power in the territory following its victory in the 2006 Palestinian legislative election.

A Palestinian protest in support of the convoy culminated in the fatal shooting of an Egyptian border guard by an unidentified person. Violent clashes between convoy members and Egyptian police led to the deportation of Galloway and other members from Egypt and a declaration by the Egyptian government that no similar convoys would be allowed to pass through the country in the future.

== Travel to Egypt ==
The convoy departed from London on 6 December 2009. It reached the Jordanian harbour of Aqaba and spent five days there negotiating with the Egyptian consul for passage through Egypt's Red Sea port. A statement from the Egyptian ministry of information said that Galloway had been told before the convoy's departure that the group had to travel through the Mediterranean port of El Arish. Failing to receive permission, the convoy travelled to the Syrian Mediterranean port of Latakia and from there to El Arish.

== Clash with Egyptian police ==
On 5 January 2010, some members of the convoy clashed with Egyptian police in El-Arish following Egypt's stipulation that 59 vehicles – 33 of them empty saloon (sedan) cars donated by the United States delegation – would have to pass through Israel on their way to the Gaza Strip. Galloway alleged that the stipulation was a breach of an earlier agreement, while an Egyptian Foreign Ministry spokesman said that nobody had been misled and that the activists were coordinating with Hamas to create problems.

The clash began at the El-Arish port building. The activists broke a security gate, leading to a fracas that Egyptian police subdued with water cannons. Activists and police were also seen hurling rocks at each other. According to an anonymous Egyptian security official, the activists blocked the port gates with trucks, burned tires, and briefly captured a police officer and four of his men, injuring them. Dozens of protesters and police were injured. Seven convoy members were arrested and ordered arrested again if they returned to Egypt.

== Gaza border riot ==
On 6 January 2010, Hamas staged a protest at the Gaza-Egypt border over the delay in the convoy's arrival. Hundreds of Hamas loyalists threw rocks and Molotov cocktails at Egyptian border guards and some attempted to scale the border fence. An Egyptian border guard was fatally shot (by whom is uncertain), and 10 Palestinians were injured, some very seriously, after gunfire erupted on both sides of the border.

Mosques throughout Egypt criticized Hamas over the killing of the Egyptian soldier during the Friday prayers on 8 January. London-based newspaper Al-Quds Al-Arabi reported that most of the 140,000 mosques operating under the auspices of Egypt's Ministry of Awqaf took part in the criticism. Egyptian government officials and media columnists also launched a scathing attack on Hamas.

Hamas spokesman Sami Abu Zuhri said the Egyptian soldier was accidentally killed by Egyptian soldiers who had opened fire on a group of Palestinian youths demonstrating near the border.

== Deportation from Egypt ==
On 8 January 2010, George Galloway was deported from Egypt, declared persona non grata and permanently banned from the country.

The Foreign Ministry of Egypt released a statement reading: "George Galloway is considered persona non grata and will not be allowed to enter into Egypt again". Egyptian Foreign Minister Ahmed Aboul Gheit stated that "members of the convoy committed hostile acts, even criminal ones, on Egyptian territory," and declared that "Egypt will no longer allow convoys, regardless of their origin or who is organizing them, from crossing its territory".

Shortly after his deportation Galloway said, "It is a badge of honour to be deported by a dictatorship" and "I've been thrown out of better joints than that." He also stated, "I wish that Egypt and Britain had leaders like [Turkish Prime Minister Recep Tayyip] Erdogan."

== Arrival in Gaza ==
The convoy crossed into the Gaza Strip late on Friday 6 January 2010. Most convoy members departed on the Sunday morning following Galloway's departure the night before.
