= Jcom Radio =

- London; England
- Frequency: 101.4 FM

Programming
- Format: Jewish

Ownership
- Owner: Jewish Communications Limited

History
- First air date: 28 October 2007
- Last air date: 12 August 2008

Jcom Radio was a London internet-based not-for-profit radio station owned by Jewish Communications Limited. The only Jewish radio station in London at the time, it closed after a successful libel action brought by then-MP George Galloway.

== History ==
Jcom Radio was formed by a group of people whose background is in radio and was founded by six men who met through another Jewish radio station, the now defunct Shalom FM (now defunct). They were Steve Newton, Jeremy Silverstone, Tony Honickberg, Mike Peters, Ronny Munster and Phil Dave.

Jewish Communications Limited was formed in March 2007. The station launched on 28 November 2007 as an RSL (Restricted Service Licence). The RSL ran for four weeks, broadcasting every Sunday to Thursday 7am - 2am, Friday 7am - 3pm and Saturday 6pm - 2am. Listening figures reached over 100,000. It ceased broadcasting on 101.4FM on 23 November 2007, continuing as an Internet Radio station, every Sunday to Thursday 6pm - 11pm.

== Closure ==
Jcom Radio was forced to cease broadcasting on 12 August 2008 when it lost a High Court action for libel brought by George Galloway, then MP for Bethnal Green and Bow. The case concerned a broadcast in November 2007, in which the station's "Middle East correspondent, Georgie Galloway" cried out "Kill the Jews, Kill the Jews". The station issued an apology and offered the MP the opportunity to speak on the station.

In the High Court. Galloway was awarded £15,000 and about £5,000 in costs. He explained that the station's apology "fell short of the categorical retraction of the imputation of anti-Semitism that I insisted upon". He said the judgement also "categorically crushed the slur of anti-Semitism" made against him. Jeremy Silverstone told The Jewish Chronicle: "While we accept the judge's view that Mr Galloway is not antisemitic, it is somewhat ironic that in his determination to prove it, he has effectively shut down London's only Jewish radio station. We were pleased that Mr Justice Eady recognised the feature was clearly intended as a spoof, understood the relatively small scale of the audience, and gave us significant credit for the apology we made on our website".
