= History of wheat industry regulation in Australia =

The wheat industry of Australia has been organised by government regulation, by both the Commonwealth Government and state governments.

The wheat and grain industry of Australia has been a major agricultural export industry providing significant parts of Australia with a viable industry and profitable crop for over one hundred years.

== 1915 to 1949 ==
In 1915, an Australian Wheat Board was constituted, comprising the Prime Minister and a Minister from each wheat growing state. The Board was created under the War Precautions Act 1914 to administer a wheat pooling scheme. The scheme was designed to assist wheat growers and ensure appropriate management of vital foodstuff during World War I.

In 1921 the Australian Wheat Board ceased operation. Regional wheat pools were established, often managed by farmer cooperatives.

In 1939 the Australian Wheat Board was re-established as a war time measure. It was created as a statutory authority with a monopoly over purchasing and exporting all Australian wheat (the "single desk").

Following World War II, in 1948 peacetime single desk legislation was introduced by the Wheat Industry Stabilisation Act 1948 to create the Australian Wheat Board.

The Act was designed to shelter growers from volatile wheat prices and comprised:

- guaranteed prices to growers, a home consumption price, a stabilisation fund;
- compulsory pooling and coordinated marketing; and
- powers to acquire all wheat produced in Australia and the sole rights to market that wheat in Australia and overseas.

== 1950 to 1979 ==
At the instigation of industry, in 1969 restrictions were placed on the quantities of wheat that could be delivered to the Australian Wheat Board in the form of wheat quotas. This was an attempt to reduce the potential for the build-up of excessive carryover stocks after the record 1968–69 Australian wheat harvest coinciding with the build-up of world wheat stocks.

In 1979 new legislation gave the Australian Wheat Board power to issue permits to growers, allowing them to deliver wheat directly to a domestic customer rather than into the bulk handling system. The Commonwealth Government introduced the Wheat Levy Act (No.1) 1979. This $2.50 per tonne levy was payable by the Australian Wheat Board to the Commonwealth Government.

== 1980 to 2009 ==
The domestic stock-feed market for wheat was effectively deregulated which allowed growers to sell wheat to anyone they chose under a permit system. The Wheat Levy Act (No. 1) 1979 was repealed.

In response to the rural recession of the 1980s, in 1986 the Government conducted a Royal Commission into Grain Storage, Handling and Transport to advise on the most efficient and cost-effective grain distribution system for Australia's future needs. The Commission's recommendations included deregulation of the wheat distribution system to minimise costs.

By 1989 the domestic wheat market was fully deregulated with the introduction of the Wheat Marketing Act 1989, which also restricted exports other non-Australian Wheat Board members. The Commonwealth Government introduced the Wheat Industry Fund Levy Act 1989 (WIF), a compulsory levy on the value of the wheat. The WIF's purpose was to release the government from directly guaranteeing the Australian Wheat Board's loans and allow the Australian Wheat Board to finance its own commercial borrowing arrangements.

In 1999 the Australian Wheat Board ceased operation as a government controlled statutory authority. It becomes AWB Limited, a grower-owned and controlled corporation. At this time, all government financial assistance, such as the underwriting of borrowings ceased. Through subsidiary company, AWB (International) Limited (AWBI), AWB Limited continued to be the sole exporter of bulk wheat from Australia via the "single desk" system.

The Government regulator, Wheat Export Authority, was established as a statutory authority to:

- monitor and report on AWBI's performance in managing the National Pool;
- control the export of wheat in containers and bags by non-AWBI exporters through issuing export consents; and
- issue licenses for bulk wheat exports, although AWBI held a power of veto over the issuing of a bulk license.

In 2000, a National Competition Policy Review of the Wheat Marketing Act 1989 was completed. Recommendations included that "if a compelling case can be made by the time of the 2004 review that there is a net public benefit, then the ‘single desk’ should continue with ongoing regular Wheat Export Authority reviews of AWBI's performance in managing the single desk, and if necessary, a further National Competition Policy review in 2010."

In 2001, AWB Limited was publicly floated on the Australian Stock Exchange.

In 2003 the Wheat Marketing Act 1989 was amended to provide funding for Wheat Export Authority through the Wheat Export Charge, a 22-cent levy on all wheat exports.

The 2004 Wheat Marketing Review examined AWBI's performance as the commercial manager of the single desk and the effectiveness of the Wheat Export Authority in monitoring and reporting AWBI's performance. The review made a number of recommendations relating to the governance of AWBI and its independence from AWB Ltd and the remuneration arrangements for services provided by AWB Ltd. The review also recommended improvements to the Wheat Export Authority's monitoring of AWBI and the introduction of a streamlined, longer-term consent system for bags and containers.

In February 2005 the Australian Government released the Productivity Commission Review of National Competition Policy Reforms which recommended an independent review of the future of the "single desk" in accordance with National Competition Policy principles as soon as practicable. While in November 2005 the Australian Government appointed Terence Cole QC to conduct an inquiry into the United Nations (UN) Oil-for-Food program and involvement of Australian Companies including AWB Limited and AWB (International) Limited (AWBI). This was in response to UN Secretary General issuing a statement on abuse of the Oil-for-Food program. The Cole Inquiry reported its findings in 2006 and the Government responded to the Cole Inquiry, which includes transferring AWBI's power of veto over bulk exports to the Minister of Agriculture, Fisheries and Forestry, on a temporary basis.

In January 2007 the Government announced that the Wheat Export Marketing Consultation Committee to undertake extensive consultation with the Australian wheat industry, particularly growers, about their wheat export marketing needs. The committee reported to the Government 30 March 2007. In May, the Prime Minister announced changes to the wheat marketing arrangements including:

- AWBI to market the 2007/08 harvest;
- the veto power over bulk wheat exports will remain with the Minister for Agriculture, Fisheries and Forestry, Mr Peter McGauran, until 30 June 2008;
- growers will be given until 1 March 2008 to form a new entity to manage the single desk (a new entity or a demerged AWBI); and
- the WEA will be given additional auditing and reporting powers; and
- container and bag exports will be deregulated.

In August, following legislative changes, the export of wheat in bags and containers was deregulated to the extent that exporters no longer had to apply to the Wheat Export Authority for consents to exports. All new shipments had to comply with the requirements of the Non-bulk Wheat Quality Assurance Scheme which was put in place to help protect the reputation and quality of Australia's wheat exports. In October, the Export Wheat Commission (EWC) was established to replace the Wheat Export Authority.

In June 2008 the Wheat Export Marketing Bill 2008 and the Wheat Export Marketing (Repeal and Consequential Amendments) Bill 2008 reforms were approved. The Export Wheat Commission drafted the new Wheat Export Accreditation Scheme 2008 for bulk wheat exporters. One month later the Government deregulated the marketing of bulk wheat exports by repealing the Wheat Marketing Act 1989, and Wheat Exports Australia was established under the Wheat Export Marketing Act 2008. This removed AWBI monopoly on Bulk wheat exports (the "single desk") and provided for the Wheat Export Accreditation Scheme.

== 2010 to date ==
In July 2001 the Productivity Commission Report recommended for the abolition of the Wheat Export Accreditation Scheme, Wheat Exports Australia (WEA) and the Wheat Export Charge. Port access test is recommended to continue to 2014.

In September 2011 the Government agreed in principle with the Productivity Commission's recommendations but indicated it will delay abolishing the Wheat Export Accreditation Scheme and the Wheat Export on 30 September 2012. Wheat Exports Australia will be wound up by 31 December 2012.

In 2013 there were legislative changes.
