= AWB oil-for-wheat scandal =

Payment of kickbacks by AWB Limited to Saddam Hussein

- Location: Iraq
- Also known as: AWB scandal
- Cause: Payment of kickbacks to the regime of Saddam Hussein in contravention of the UN Oil-for-Food Programme
- Participants: AWB Limited
- Outcome: AWB Limited has undergone a major restructuring, losing its monopoly supply of Australia wheat exports, and appointing an entirely new management. Its profitability has suffered.
- Inquiries: Volcker Inquiry (2004–05); Cole Inquiry (2005–06)

The AWB oil-for-wheat scandal (also known just as the AWB scandal) refers to the payment of kickbacks to the regime of Iraqi president Saddam Hussein in contravention of the United Nations Oil-for-Food Humanitarian Programme. AWB Limited was a major grain marketing organisation based in Australia. For much of the 20th and early 21st century, it was an Australian Government entity operating a single desk regime over Australian wheat, meaning it had the sole ability to export Australian wheat, for which it paid a single, fixed price. In the mid-2000s, it was found to have been, through middlemen, paying kickbacks to the regime of Saddam Hussein, in exchange for lucrative wheat contracts. This was in direct contradiction of United Nations Sanctions, and of Australian law.

AWB delivered 90% of the Iraqi wheat market before its practices were questioned in 2005. United Nations investigator Paul Volcker found that the Australian Wheat Board, and later AWB Limited, were not the only, but certainly the largest source of kickbacks to the Iraqi regime. The Australian Government also launched a Royal Commission, which recommended that criminal proceedings commence against 12 people. Ultimately, criminal charges were dropped by the Australian Federal Police. Several Australian civil cases were successful. Since the payments were discovered, AWB Limited has undergone a major restructuring, losing its monopoly supply of Australia wheat exports, and appointing an entirely new management. However, its profitability continues to suffer.

Although AWB and by extension the Australian Government were not the only entities to be implicated in the Oil-for-Food scandal, the event earned a place in Australian political consciousness.

== Background ==
=== AWB Limited ===
The Australian Wheat Board was a statutory authority established in 1939. AWB Limited was the company that resulted from its privatisation in 1999. The kick-backs scandal engulfed both bodies. The Australian Wheat Board and AWB Limited enjoyed a monopoly over the sale of Australian wheat exports. It achieved this through the use of a monopsony (single buyer) regime within Australia, where wheat growers were only able to sell their wheat to a single entity (referred to as a single desk). This was intended to prevent farmers under-cutting each other on price, and thus assure the highest price for Australian wheat. The AWB had sold wheat to Iraq since 1948, and was the single largest supplier of humanitarian goods to the nation during the Oil-for-Food Programme.

=== Oil-for-Food Programme ===
Following the Iraqi invasion of Kuwait in 1990, the United Nations had imposed a financial and trade embargo on Iraq. It was intended to weaken the Iraqi economy so that Saddam could not build up weapons for further wars. UN Security Council Resolution 661 prevented all states and their nationals from making funds available to Iraq. These sanctions were widely effective, leading to food shortages and international condemnation as the humanitarian crisis became clear.

In response to this, the Oil-for-Food Programme was begun. It allowed Iraq to sell oil to the rest of the world, provided the returns from this were kept in a UN bank account. This money could then be used by the regime, with UN oversight, to purchase a strict list of humanitarian supplies.

The Oil-for-Food Programme however in itself faced criticism, with many alleging that it was too expensive to administer and liable to abuse. The programme was discontinued on the lead-up to the invasion of Iraq.

== AWB kickbacks regime ==
=== Transportation schemes ===
Alia was established in 1994 as a Jordanian-registered transportation company, intended to refurbish Iraqi vessels stranded off the coast of Jordan for commercial use. Majority ownership of 51%, was held by a Jordanian national, who held them on behalf of a close Iraqi associate, and the remaining two shares were held by assigned Iraqi Ministry of Transportation employees. In 1999, it was arranged by the Ministry of Transportation for Alia to commence inland transportation of goods arriving at the Umm Qasr, Iraq's only port. Alia was to receive a commission on the cost of these goods, paid for initially by the company bringing goods into Iraq, and then tacked onto the total bill of the Iraqi Government. They advertised this new arrangement through their usual tender process. Under the sanctions regime, third parties were prohibited from engaging with the Government of Iraq unless they had Security Council approval. By having the party exporting goods (i.e. the humanitarian supplier) be the one to pay Alia, the Iraqi Government was able to disguise this.

However, transportation services were in fact provided by employees of the Iraqi Government, who also negotiated the size of the commission with the humanitarian supplier .

Prior to 1999, AWB had only been responsible for shipping wheat up to the port of entry in Iraq. However, in July 1999 it entered into this new contract with the Iraqi Government that had AWB assume responsibility, through Alia, of transporting wheat to points throughout Iraq. AWB told the UN Investigation that this was suggested by the Iraqi Government. Given that inland transportation was in fact provided by government employees, this was described in the UN report as "tantamount to payments to the Government of Iraq for...the provision of inland transportation services". AWB did not disclose to the UN its arrangements with the Iraqi government, instead saying it paid discharge costs to unnamed 'maritime agents' of up to $12 per tonne.

The initial cost of these transportation contracts in 1999 was $10 to $12/t. These rates rose by up to 50% the following year, then increased from 2001 until the just before the invasion to between $45 and $56/t. These increases were offered with no explanation, and were far beyond what could be considered a reasonable transportation fee in Iraq. When the UN Inquiry interviewed the former Iraqi Minister of Trade, he said that these fees were then added onto the original contract through after-sales service fees, making them revenue-neutral for AWB. Only a small part of the fees remained in the hands of the drivers and Alia, the majority being funnelled back to the Iraqi Government. Given these fees were added on top of the price of the wheat, this arrangement then had the effect of moving the proceeds from oil revenues from being used in humanitarian consumption to being placed in the form of currency in the hands of members of the Iraqi government. David Marr and Marion Wilkonson, both journalists with the Sydney Morning Herald, wrote that the "beauty of the rort from AWB's point of view was that Australia's wheat farmers didn't pay a cent. The money was all coming out of the UN's escrow account".

The UN investigation concluded that AWB paid over $221.7 million in 'inland transportation costs'. This totalled more than 14% of the illicit funds the Iraqi Government procured through kickback schemes over this time.

=== Level of knowledge ===
The initial UN investigation was only partly interested in AWB, and was unable to decisively conclude whether it knew that it was breaching sanctions. The later Australian Cole Inquiry was far less charitable.

AWB told the UN investigation that it believed the fees it was paying to Alia were genuine transportation fees, and was not aware of its ownership and operations being so tied to the Iraqi Government, nor of the fact that it was paying kickbacks to the regime. It also produced correspondence between itself and the Australian Department of Foreign Affairs and Trade in which the Department advised it could see "no reason from an international legal perspective" that AWB could not enter into a commercial agreement with a Jordanian-based company.

Alia's owner told the UN inquiry that he believed AWB knew his company did not actually provide transportation services, but he had not spoken to AWB about the matter. Alia's General Manager, Othman al-Absi, said that AWB had been very interested in the capacity of Alia to transport wheat, and had asked the Jordanian Government whether Alia was a genuine trucking company. He later told the Cole Inquiry, "I do not recollect ever being asked by anyone from AWB about who owned or controlled Alia, or whether it had connections with the Ministry of Transport. However, Alia's ownership was public knowledge and was not hidden." Both him and Alia's owner agree that they never disclosed Alia's part-ownership by the Iraqi Government to AWB. The Enquiry concluded that it could not for certain say that AWB was aware of the arrangement it had entered into with the Iraqi Government, however, much circumstantial evidence (suggestion of Alia by the Iraqi Government, sharp rise in its prices, knowledge that prices were determined by the Iraqi Government, lack of logistics detail offered by Alia, curious wording in faxes received by AWB) meant it had cause to be suspicious. AWB representatives admitted in a meeting with the UN investigators that it was 'debatable' whether senior management should have known of the kickbacks.

The Cole Inquiry delved in much greater detail into the breaches by AWB. Mark Emons, the manager of AWB's Middle East operations, told the inquiry that he, and Dominic Hogan from AWB's Cairo office, at the very first meeting at which the prospect of certain arrangements were broached in 1999 "knew what Iraq was asking was outside the sanctions". Furthermore, it found that AWB attempted to hide and distance itself from the payments to Alia, using counter-parties and intermediaries to get the money to Alia, who in turn transferred it to the regime. The final report states that there was "no sensible basis for making these payments...at a cost to AWB, except to disguise AWB's making of payments to Alia".

Under Australian legislation, all shipments to Iraq were banned unless the Foreign Minister (at the time, the Alexander Downer) was "satisfied that permitting the exportation will not infringe the international obligations of Australia". The UN Enquiry did not comment on whether the Australian Government should have known about the actions of the AWB. Through the Department of Foreign Affairs and Trade, the Government knew that AWB had entered into an arrangement with Alia. The Cole Inquiry found in "secret evidence" that the ownership of Alia was known since 1998 in the departments of Foreign Affairs, Defence and Prime Minister and Cabinet, as indicated by an intelligence report from a "foreign agency".

== Discovery of breaches of Australian and international law ==
The invasion took place on 20 March. By 1 May, the government of Saddam Hussein was defeated, although resistance and insurgency against the military occupation still continued.

In 2004, Iraqi daily Al Mada published a list of 270 persons and entities who were given oil vouchers for helping Saddam Hussein. The report alleged clear violation of the agreements of the Oil-for-Food Programme established fourteen years earlier and ending the year before.

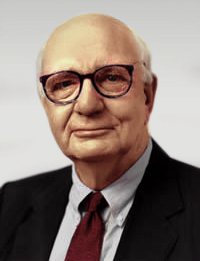
Paul Volcker, former US Federal Reserve Chairman, led the independent UN inquiry

In response to this, the UN launched an independent inquiry into the programme, headed by former U.S. Federal Reserve Chairman Paul Volcker. Its terms of enquiry were to "collect and examine information relating to the administration and management of the Oil-for-Food Program...including entities that have entered into contracts with the United Nations or with Iraq under the Programme."

The final report was released on 27 October 2005. It accused almost half of the companies operating in Iraq during the time of the Oil-for-Food Programme to have paid either kickbacks or illegal surcharges to secure Iraqi business. In special reference to AWB, it stated that "little doubt remains that AWB made large numbers of payments to Alia, and these payments in turn were channelled to the Iraqi regime."

In response to the UN Report, the Government sanctioned a royal-commission into the allegations, headed by Honourable Terence Cole QC, a former Judge of Appeal of the New South Wales Supreme Court. The Commission called to the stand many prominent members of the Government, including the then Prime Minister of Australia John Howard, the first Australian Prime Minister to face a judicial inquiry in more than twenty years. The Cole Inquiry into the company's role in the scandal was completed and tabled by Attorney-General Philip Ruddock on 27 November 2006. The inquiry found that, at the insistence of the Iraq government of dictator Saddam Hussein, the AWB agreed to pay 'transportation fees' of around A$290 million. Cole's findings agreed with the UN Report in finding this money was paid, often indirectly, to a Jordanian transportation company, Alia, who kept a small percentage of the fees, and paid the remainder onto Saddam's government. This breached the sanctions placed on the Iraqi regime. The Cole Inquiry concluded that from mid-1999, AWB had knowingly entered into an arrangement that involved paying kickbacks to the Iraqi government, in order to retain its business. It cleared Government bureaucrats and ministers from wrongdoing, however, it recommended criminal prosecutions be begun against former AWB executives.

The kickbacks also breached the OECD Anti-Bribery Convention.

== Recommendations ==
The Cole Inquiry recommended that 12 people be investigated for possible criminal and corporations offences over the scandal. It wanted this to occur through a "joint task force comprising the Australian Federal Police, Victoria Police, and the Australian Securities & Investments Commission (ASIC)".

The UN Report recommended a structuring of the way the UN administers many programmes.

== Outcomes ==
=== Litigation ===
The scandal resulted in international condemnation and litigation. Although the United States successfully pursued criminal charges against several citizens and others in its borders, the Australian criminal investigation into AWB was eventually dropped. Civil charges have however been successful.

On 11 July 2006, North American farmers claimed $1 billion in damages from AWB at Washington DC, alleging the Australian wheat exporter used bribery and other corrupt activities to corner grain markets. The growers claimed that AWB used the same techniques to secure grain sales in other markets in Asia and other countries in the Middle East. The lawsuit was dismissed in March 2007.

In August 2009, the Australian Federal Police dropped their investigation into any criminal actions undertaken by AWB and others in this matter. This decision came after Paul Hastings QC declared the prospect of convictions was limited and "not in the public interest".

A civil case was brought by shareholders of AWB, and was settled out of court for $39.5 million in February 2010.

The Australian Securities and Investments Commission proceeded with several civil cases against six former directors and officers of AWB; some of which have been discontinued on terms that the parties bear their own costs. ASIC decided to discontinue the proceedings after forming the view that it was no longer in the public interest to pursue its claims. Eventually the most serious of ASIC's charges against Trevor Flugge, the former Chairman of AWB, and Peter Geary, the former Group General Manager Trading of AWB, were dismissed. Flugge was later fined $50,000 and banned from managing a company for 5 years, for failing to inquire about AWB's payments to the Iraqi regime. AWB's managing director at the time, Andrew Lindberg, and CFO Paul Ingleby were fined $100,000 and $40,000 and banned from manager roles for 2 years and 15 months, respectively.

=== Effect on foreign relations ===
When the scandal was uncovered, Australia was part of the Coalition of the Willing in Iraq, where it had helped depose the government of Saddam Hussein. The scandal caused significant concern. The Australian Government attempted to distance itself from the AWB, who from 1999 had been restructured into a private company.

=== AWB today ===
The crisis brought about a significant loss of support for the AWB's monopoly power over the sale of Australian wheat. As early as February 2006, the Government expressed displeasure with its monopoly, saying it could be used as a bargaining chip in international trade negotiations. The AWB share-price continued to suffer, and the company was acquired by Agrium Inc. in December 2010 and delisted from the Australian Securities Exchange.

=== Significance in Australian politics ===
Two books have so far been published on the scandal. The first was by Stephen Bartos, entitled Against the grain : the AWB scandal and why it happened. The second was Kickback: Inside the Australian Wheat Board Scandal by The Australian journalist Caroline Overington.

== See also ==
- List of Australian political controversies
