= Trevor Flugge =

Australian farmer and businessman

Trevor James Flugge
- Born: 1 February 1947 (age 79)
- Education: Aquinas College, Perth
- Occupations: Farmer; businessman

Trevor James Flugge (/ˌfluːɡi/ FLOO-ghee; born 1 February 1947) is an Australian farmer and businessman. He is best known as a former official of the Australian Wheat Board (AWB). He joined the board in 1984, was chair of AWB in 1995–2002, and was present at meetings in Iraq which were linked to the Oil-for-Food scandal, and an inquiry by the United Nations.

== Background ==
Flugge was educated at Aquinas College, Perth, and became a farmer in the Katanning area.

In 1987, he was an unsuccessful National Party candidate for the seat of O'Connor (against Wilson Tuckey) in the Australian election that year.

Flugge has also served as chair of the Australian Wheat Growers Association, and as a board member of the major diversified company Wesfarmers.

== Oil-for-Food scandal and the Cole Inquiry ==
Trevor Flugge was chair of AWB until March 2002, when he was voted off the board by the A-class shareholders (wheat growers). He was appointed a consultant to AWB after the vote and travelled to Baghdad later that same year, with AWB chairman Andrew Lindberg, to rescue an AWB wheat export deal with Saddam Hussein's regime.

There were later accusations that AWB had paid bribes to secure the export contract. AWB officials agreed to pay $2 million to the Iraqi regime, which would then allow wheat exports to resume. This payment was made by inflating the price of wheat contracts administered by the United Nations Oil-for-Food Programme.

Following the 2003 invasion and overthrow of the Hussein regime, Flugge was made a senior adviser to the Iraqi agriculture department.

After the bribery became public in 2005, Flugge denied to the UN's Volker inquiry that he knew about AWB's payments to the Hussein regime. Flugge was also called before an Australian government investigation in 2005, the Cole inquiry. When giving evidence to the latter inquiry, Flugge frequently claimed to have no knowledge of matters discussed at meetings he attended, due to hearing loss.
