= United Nations Security Council Resolution 1538 =

UN Security Council Resolution 1538
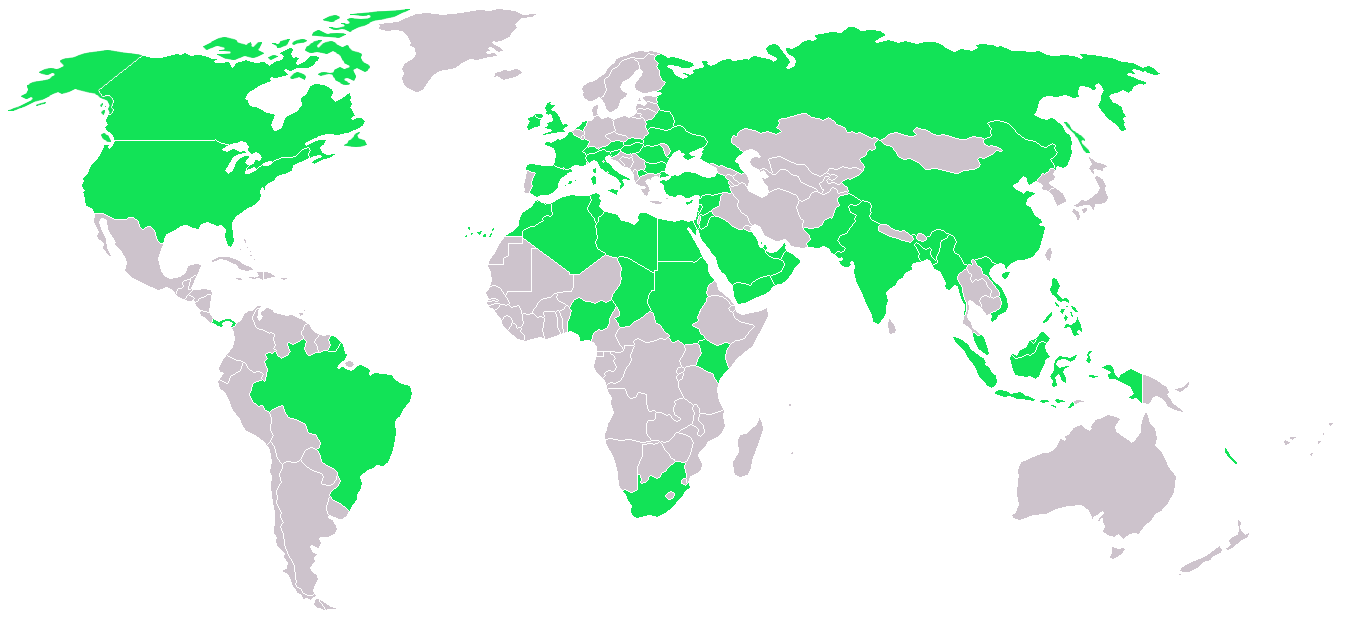
- Countries that benefitted from the abuse of the Oil-for-Food Programme according to Al Mada
- Date: 21 April 2004
- Meeting no.: 4,946
- Code: S/RES/1538 (Document)
- Subject: The situation between Iraq and Kuwait
- Voting summary: 15 voted for; None voted against; None abstained
- Result: Adopted

Security Council composition
- Permanent members: China; France; Russia; United Kingdom; United States
- Non-permanent members: Algeria; Angola; Benin; Brazil; Chile; Germany; Pakistan; Philippines; Romania; Spain

United Nations Security Council resolution 1538, adopted unanimously on 21 April 2004, after expressing concern about the administration and management of the Oil-for-Food Programme in Iraq, the council ordered an inquiry to investigate the matter.

The security council expressed its willingness to see an investigation into the allegations that the Iraqi government had evaded the provisions of Resolution 661 (1990) through bribery, kickbacks, surcharges on sales of oil and illicit payments in regard to purchases of humanitarian goods. Additionally, there were media reports that corruption and fraud had occurred during the management and administration of the Programme, established in Resolution 986 (1995). The allegations first appeared in January 2004 in the Iraqi newspaper Al Mada which alleged that 270 former government officials, activists and journalists from 46 countries had profited from the Programme. The council reaffirmed that illegal activities carried out by any representatives of the United Nations were unacceptable.

The resolution welcomed the establishment of an independent high-level inquiry into the matter by the Secretary-General Kofi Annan and stressed the need for full co-operation with the inquiry by the Coalition Provisional Authority, United Nations officials and personnel, Iraq and all Member States.

== See also ==
- Gulf War
- Invasion of Kuwait
- Iraq sanctions
- Iraq War
- List of United Nations Security Council Resolutions 1501 to 1600 (2003–2005)
- Oil-for-Food Program Hearings
