= Warfield Mares' Hurdle =

Hurdle horse race in Britain

Bet365 Mares' Hurdle
- Class: Grade 2
- Location: Ascot Racecourse; Ascot, England
- Race type: Hurdle race
- Sponsor: Bet365
- Website: Ascot

Race information
- Distance: 2m 7f 118y
- Surface: Turf
- Track: Right-handed
- Qualification: Four-years-old and up fillies & mares
- Purse: £50,000 (2020); 1st: £28,475

Warfield Mares' Hurdle
2026
Ooh Betty	La Conquiere	Sunset Marquesa

Previous years
2025
Take No Chances	Kargese	Ooh Betty
2024
Marie's Rock	You Wear It Well	Tweed Skirt
2022
Molly Ollys Wishes	My Sister Sarah	Whitehotchillifili
2021
Roksana	Magic Of Light	Eglantine Du Seuil

2020-2011
2020
Magic Of Light	Sensulano	Papagana
2019
Magic Of Light	Jester Jet	If You Say Run
2018
La Bague Au Roi	Sainte Ladylime	Graceful Legend
2016
Vroum Vroum Mag	Jennies Jewel	Cannon Fodder
2015
Bitofapuzzle	Carole's Spirit	Land of Vic
2014
Highland Retreat	Carole's Spirit	Mickie
2012
Violin Davis	Kentford Grey Lady	Our Girl Salley
2011
Sparky May	Carole's Legacy	Alasi

2010-2008
2010
Sweetheart	Easter Legend	Silver Kate
2009
United	Sweetheart	Doubly Guest
2008
Labelthou	Refinement	Gaspara

The Warfield Mares' Hurdle is a Grade 2 National Hunt hurdle race in Great Britain which is open to fillies and mares aged four years or older. It is run at Ascot over a distance of about 2 miles 7½ furlongs (2 miles 7 furlongs and 118 yards, or 4,735 metres), and during its running there are eleven hurdles to be jumped. The race is scheduled to take place each year in January. It was first run in 2008.

The race was run as the Oilexco Mares' Only Hurdle, the Warfield Mares' Hurdle in 2009 and the 1942 Was A Vintage Year Mares' Hurdle from 2010 to 2012. Since 2013 it has been run under various sponsored titles. Its current title since 2021 is the Matchbook Betting Podcast Mares' Hurdle.

== Winners ==
Year	Winner	Age	Jockey	Trainer
2008	Labelthou	9	Timmy Murphy	Emma Lavelle
2009	United	8	Dominic Elsworth	Lucy Wadham
2010	Sweetheart	6	Mattie Batchelor	Jamie Poulton
2011	Sparky May	6	Keiran Burke	Patrick Rodford
2012	Violin Davis	6	Ruby Walsh	Paul Nicholls
2014	Highland Retreat	7	Noel Fehily	Harry Fry
2015	Bitofapuzzle	7	Noel Fehily	Harry Fry
2016	Vroum Vroum Mag	7	Ruby Walsh	Willie Mullins
2017	Abandoned due to frost (Note: The 2017 running was cancelled after the original fixture at Ascot and a rescheduled race at Huntingdon were both abandoned due to frost)			
2018	La Bague Au Roi	7	Noel Fehily	Warren Greatrex
2019	Magic of Light	8	Robbie Power	Jessica Harrington
2020	Magic of Light	9	Robbie Power	Jessica Harrington
2021	Roksana	9	Harry Skelton	Dan Skelton
2022	Molly Ollys Wishes	8	Harry Skelton	Dan Skelton
2023	Abandoned due to frost			
2024	Marie's Rock	9	James Bowen	Nicky Henderson
2025	Take No Chances	7	Kielan Woods	Dan Skelton
2026	Ooh Betty	8	Ben Jones	Ben Clarke

== See also ==
- Horse racing in Great Britain
- List of British National Hunt races
