= Ben R. Pollner =

American businessman (born 1941)

Benjamin R. Pollner
- Born: 21.05.1941 (age 84–85)
- Died: Sept. 2018
- Education: B.Sc. Wagner College; M.B.A. New York University
- Occupation: oil trader
- Known for: founder of Taurus Petroleum
- Spouse: Alice Thorpe
- Children: Edward J. Pollner; Amy P. Moritz; T. Anthony Pollner (deceased)

Benjamin R. Pollner (born in 1941 in New York) is an American businessman. He is the founder of Taurus Petroleum, based in Geneva, created in 1993, and remains its chairman and chief executive officer.

== Early life and education ==
In 1963, he graduated from Wagner College with a B.Sc. in Chemistry. Between 1965 and 1968 he attended the New York University Graduate School of Business Administration.

== Career ==
Ben Pollner held various positions in industrial companies until joining the Steuber Corporation in 1970 when he commenced his international marketing, transport and trading activities in the bulk petrochemical industry. In the 1990s, he worked for David B. Chalmers Jr at Bayoil Petroleum. Pollner is a member of a small group of top oil and mineral traders who were under the tutelage of one-time fugitive financier Marc Rich.

=== Oil for Food program ===
Pollner's company, Taurus Petroleum was responsible for over $4 billion in Oil-for-Food deals with Iraq. Under the program, oil was purchased from Iraq and resold to large refiners in exchange for food. Taurus and Gennady Timchenko and Torbjorn Tornqvist's Gunvor are the main two shareholders of the United States' Castor Group which includes both Castor Americas Incorporated and Castor Petroleum Limited with offices located at rue des Marches in Geneva.

Pollner, through his company Taurus Petroleum, purchased the majority of the oil from two companies in Geneva, Switzerland, Fenar Petroleum and Alcon Petroleum (both registered in Liechtenstein in 1999). Fenar and Alcon were among the largest oil purchasers under the Oil-for-Food program exporting a combined $2.47 billion in crude oil. It was alleged that Pollner in fact, either controlled or owned both companies. Fenar and Alcon were alleged to have funneled $18.9 million in kickbacks to the regime of Saddam Hussein, in the form of surcharges on oil purchases. Taurus has denied paying the surcharges. In response to the investigation, Pollner stated: "I did nothing in New York or the U.S. that would be considered illegal." Pollner was never indicted. Prior to answering questions from the Southern District of New York in 2004, Pollner moved to Switzerland.

=== Broker for Ecuadorian oil ===
Taurus Petroleum also functions as a broker of oil from Ecuador, working in conjunction with PetroChina.

== Philanthropy ==
Ben Pollner is active in various charitable functions including the T. Anthony Pollner Distinguished Professorship and FACES (Finding a Cure for Epilepsy and Seizures).

== Personal life ==
He was married to Alice Thorpe. They had three children, Edward J. Pollner (married to Lisa) of Fairfield, Connecticut, Amy P. Moritz (married to Sasha) of New York, NY and T. Anthony Pollner (who died in a motorcycle accident in 2001).
