= List of acts of the Parliament of Western Australia from 2016 =

This is a list of acts of the Parliament of Western Australia for the year 2016.

== 2016 ==
Short title, or popular name	Citation	Royal assent
Long title
Natural Gas (Canning Basin Joint Venture) Agreement Amendment Act 2016	No. 1 of 2016	28 February 2016
An Act to amend the Natural Gas (Canning Basin Joint Venture) Agreement Act 2013. (Note: Natural Gas (Canning Basin Joint Venture) Agreement Act 2013 (No. 2))
City of Perth Act 2016	No. 2 of 2016	3 March 2016
An Act to —: continue the City of Perth as a local government district but redefine its boundaries; and; recognise Perth as the capital of Western Australia and the special significance of the role and responsibilities of the City of Perth that flow from that; and; establish a City of Perth Committee with functions that include the facilitation of collaboration between the State and the City of Perth; and; repeal the City of Perth Restructuring Act 1993; (Note: City of Perth Restructuring Act 1993 (No. 38)) and; make consequential and other amendments to the Botanic Gardens and Parks Authority Act 1998, (Note: Botanic Gardens and Parks Authority Act 1998 (No. 53)) the Local Government Act 1960 (Note: Local Government Act 1960 (No. 84)) Part VIA and the Local Government Act 1995; (Note: Local Government Act 1995 (No. 74)) and; provide for related matters.
Motor Vehicle (Catastrophic Injuries) Act 2016 or the Motor Vehicle and Workplace Accidents (Catastrophic Injuries) Act 2016	No. 8 of 2016	14 April 2016
An Act to provide for a scheme for the lifetime care and support of certain people catastrophically injured in motor vehicle or workplace accidents, to make consequential amendments to other Acts, and for related purposes.
Appropriation (Recurrent 2016-17) Act 2016	No. 20 of 2016	26 August 2016
An Act to grant supply and to appropriate and apply out of the Consolidated Account certain sums for the recurrent services and purposes of the year ending 30 June 2017.
Appropriation (Capital 2016-17) Act 2016	No. 21 of 2016	26 August 2016
An Act to grant supply and to appropriate and apply out of the Consolidated Account certain sums for the capital purposes of the year ending 30 June 2017.
Marketing of Potatoes Amendment and Repeal Act 2016	No. 22 of 2016	12 September 2016
An Act—: to repeal the Marketing of Potatoes Act 1946 (Note: Marketing of Potatoes Act 1946 (No. 26)) to deregulate the ware potato industry; and; to provide for consequential amendments to other Acts and related purposes.
Biodiversity Conservation Act 2016	No. 24 of 2016	21 September 2016
An Act to provide for—: the conservation and protection of biodiversity and biodiversity components in Western Australia; and; the ecologically sustainable use of biodiversity components in Western Australia; and; the repeal of the Wildlife Conservation Act 1950 (Note: Fauna Protection Act 1950 (No. 77)) and the Sandalwood Act 1929; (Note: Sandalwood Act 1929 (No. 27)) and; consequential amendments to other Acts, and for related purposes.
Statutes (Repeals) Act 2016	No. 50 of 2016	28 November 2016
An Act to repeal the following Acts—: the Coal Industry Tribunal of Western Australia Act 1992; (Note: Coal Industry Tribunal of Western Australia Act 1992 (No. 37)); the Labour Relations Reform Act 2002; (Note: Labour Relations Reform Act 2002 (No. 20)); the Spear-guns Control Act 1955; (Note: Spear-guns Control Act 1955 (No. 5)); the Western Australian Marine (Sea Dumping) Act 1981; (Note: Western Australian Marine (Sea Dumping) Act 1981 (No. 111)); the Escheat and forfeiture of real and personal property (1834) (Imp), (Note: Trust Property Escheat Act 1834 (4 & 5 Will. 4. c. 23 (Imp))); and to amend several Acts as a consequence of those repeals.
	No. X of 2016	
Construction Contracts Amendment Act 2016	No. 55 of 2016	29 November 2016
An Act to amend the Construction Contracts Act 2004. (Note: Construction Contracts Act 2004 (No. 16))

== Sources ==
- "legislation.wa.gov.au".
