= Royal Commissions Act 1902 =

Australian legislation

Parliament of Australia
- Long title: An Act relating to Royal Commissions
- Assented to: 8 August 1902
- Commenced: 8 August 1902
- Status: Amended

The Royal Commissions Act 1902 is an Australian act of parliament which authorises the Australian Governor-General to initiate an investigation, referred to as a royal commission. Royal Commissions are a major independent public inquiry into an issue, initiated by the Australian Government. They often investigate cases of political corruption or matters of significant public concern.

A Royal Commissioner, or panel of Royal Commissioners, is appointed by letters patent to preside over the commission of inquiry. The Commissioner has considerable powers, generally greater than those of a judge. However, the powers of the Commissioner are restricted to the terms of reference of the commission handed down by the Governor-General in the letters patent. Once a Commission has started the government cannot end it, and thus the government is careful in framing the terms of reference, and may place a time limit for an inquiry. The terms of reference may be amended and the time for an inquiry may be extended, at the government's discretion.

== Legislation ==
The Royal Commissions Act 1902 received royal assent on 8 August 1902. The legislation allows the Governor-General to issue letters patent in the name of the Crown for a Commission of Inquiry. Specifically, the act grants the Governor-General the power to make or authorise any inquiry, or to issue any commission to make any inquiry. The terms of reference of the inquiry must relate to the peace, order and good government of the Commonwealth, any public purpose or any power of the Commonwealth.

The legislation provides that a Royal Commissioner has the power to issue a summons to a person to appear before the Commission at a hearing, to give evidence or to produce documents or other things specified in the summons. The commission has a discretion whether it will require a person appearing at a hearing to take an oath or give an affirmation to tell the truth.

A person served with a summons or a notice to produce documents must comply with that requirement, or face prosecution for an offence. The penalty for conviction upon such an offence is two years imprisonment. However, the Act excuses the penalty for failing to attend if a reasonable excuse can be provided (self-incrimination is not a reasonable excuse, however, as statements or documents tended by witnesses are not admissible in evidence against the witness).

A Royal Commission may authorise the Australian Federal Police to execute search warrants.

== Notable Royal Commissioners ==
- Terence Cole, who presided over the Cole Royal Commission into the Building and Construction Industry (2001 – 2003) and also presided over the Cole Inquiry into certain Australian companies in relation to the UN Oil-For-Food Programme (2005 – 2006)
- H. C. Coombs, who presided over the Royal Commission on Australian Government Administration (1974 – 1976)
- Frank Costigan, who presided over the Costigan Commission on the activities of the Federated Ship Painters and Dockers Union (1980 – 1984)
- Elizabeth Evatt, who presided over the Royal Commission on human relationships (1974 – 1978)
- Jim McClelland, who presided over the McClelland Royal Commission into British nuclear tests in Australia (1984 – 1985)
- Ronald Wilson, who jointly presided over the National Inquiry into the Separation of Aboriginal and Torres Strait Islander Children from their Families (1995 – 1997); published as the Bringing Them Home report

== See also ==
- List of Australian Royal Commissions
