= List of acts of the Parliament of Western Australia from 1946 =

This is a list of acts of the Parliament of Western Australia for the year 1946.

== 1946 ==
Short title, or popular name	Citation	Royal assent
Long title
	No. 1 of 1946	28 August 1946
An Act to apply out of the Consolidated Revenue Fund the sum of Two Million Two Hundred Thousand Pounds, and from Moneys to Credit of the General Loan Fund Two Hundred Thousand Pounds, to the Service of the Year ending 30th June, 1947, and to apply out of the Public Account the sum of Three Hundred Thousand Pounds for the purpose of temporary Advances to be made by the Treasurer,
Bulk Handling Act Amendment Act 1946	No. 2 of 1946	23 October 1946
An Act to amend the Bulk Handling Act, 1935-1943, (Note: Bulk Handling Act 1935 (No. 40)) by making provision for and with respect to the purchase by Co-operative Bulk Handling Limited of a limited number of shares of its members.
Railway (Hopetoun–Ravensthorpe) Discontinuance Act 1946	No. 7 of 1946	13 November 1946
An Act to authorise the discontinuance of the operation of the Hopetoun–Ravensthorpe Railway and for other purposes.
Marketing of Potatoes Act 1946	No. 26 of 1946	14 January 1947
An Act to make provision for the Marketing, Sale and Disposal of Potatoes, to control their production for sale, to repeal the Potato Growers Licensing Act, 1941, (Note: Potato Growers Licensing Act 1941 (No. 42)) and to constitute the Western Australian Potato Marketing Board; and for other relative purposes.
	No. X of 1946	
Wheat Industry Stabilisation Act 1946	No. 65 of 1946	24 January 1947
An Act relating to the stabilisation of the Wheat Industry and to provide for the control of production of wheat.

== Sources ==
- "legislation.wa.gov.au".
