= Single desk =

Monopoly marketer and buyer of a product with multiple suppliers

A single desk is a monopoly marketer and buyer of a product with multiple suppliers. They were common in markets for agricultural produce.

== Single-desk marketing in Australia ==
=== Wheat ===
In Australia, the single desk was the monopoly marketing of wheat by the Australian Wheat Board (1939–1999) and its privatised successor, AWB (International) Limited (1999–2008). In this situation, returns from growers were pooled together nationally and the prices averaged by the Board, which covered both domestic and international sales until 1989, when it focused exclusively on exports. In its last year, this was limited further to just bulk exports.

Momentum for change to the export marketing arrangements built up over time following:

- the National Competition Policy Review of the Wheat Marketing Act 1989 (2000), which found there was no clear, credible, and unambiguous evidence that the current arrangements for the marketing of export wheat were of net benefit to the Australian community
- the successful deregulation of the export of other grains
- increasing grower dissatisfaction with the performance of the single desk, notably in Western Australia
- the Inquiry into Certain Australian Companies in Relation to the UN Oil-For-Food Programme (2006).

In 1999, Wheat Export Authority was created following passing of amendments to the Wheat Marketing Act 1989.

In October 2007, Wheat Export Authority was replaced with the Export Wheat Commission.

In July 2008, the Export Wheat Commission was replaced by Wheat Exports Australia.

=== Other products ===
Until 2016, Western Australia had a monopoly purchaser of ware potatoes, the Potato Marketing Corporation of Western Australia. Other single desks existed in Australia, such as Queensland Sugar Limited, the Australian Barley Board, and dairy single desks in each state, among others.

== Single-desk marketing in Canada ==
The Canadian Wheat Board was Canada's monopoly marketer of wheat and barley grown in the prairie provinces. Its monopoly was removed in 2011, effective August 2012.

== See also ==
- Wheat pool
