= Wheat Export Authority =

Australian government agency, 1999–2007

The Wheat Export Authority (WEA) was established 1 July 1999 as part of restructuring the former government-owned Australian Wheat Board in preparation for its sale as AWB Limited. It was felt that a number of the tasks carried out by the previous Australian Wheat Board would not be appropriate for a privately owned body; thus, the WEA was established. The WEA's role was determined by the Wheat Marketing Act 1989 and its operations were funded by a charge on Australian wheat exports.

The WEA was controlled by a five-member board of directors, appointed for a period of up to three years by the Minister for Agriculture, Fisheries and Forestry. They were supported by a 16-person Canberra-based Secretariat, headed by a Chief Executive Officer. The WEA was an agency under the Commonwealth Authorities and Corporations Act 1997.

The WEA had two major functions, including monitoring and reporting to the government and growers on AWB(I)'s performance in managing the National [wheat] Pool. This was done through a commercial-in-confidence report to the Minister and a public report, known as the Growers Report.

Through its second function, the WEA also considered export applications from parties other than AWB(I) [known as non-AWB(I) exporters] to export wheat from Australia, usually in bags and containers. Since 17 August 2007, the export of wheat in bags and containers has been deregulated. Non-AWB(I) exports, are permitted in limited volumes to protect the integrity of the National Pool and make up about 4% of total exports.

In December 2006 the Government amended the Act transferring the power of veto over bulk exports from AWB(I) to the Minister, on a temporary basis until 30 June 2007. This has since been extended to the end of June 2008. The Government then established a Wheat Export Marketing Consultation Committee which consulted with wheat growers across Australia and presented its finding to the government on 29 March 2007. The government is using this report as the basis for its consideration of new wheat export marketing arrangements.

The WEA was succeeded by the Export Wheat Commission in 2007.

== AWB Iraqi kickbacks scandal ==
In the course of the Cole inquiry into allegations that AWB paid kickbacks to Saddam Hussein's regime in Iraq for wheat shipments under the United Nations Oil-for-Food Program, it was revealed that the WEA board, upon hearing of the allegations through media sources, asked AWB(I) to show them Iraq wheat sales contracts. The WEA had limited powers and resources, far below those of the Cole Inquiry, and its examination of material provided to it by AWB at that time failed to reveal information of concern. During the Inquiry the Grain Board of Iraq ceased to deal with AWB. This resulted in the establishment of the Wheat Australia consortium to export wheat to Iraq in 2006, with special approval from the WEA and Australian Government. The temporary wheat export arrangements allow other exporters to apply for consents to export in bulk. However, of 77 applications received by the WEA since December 2006, just two had been approved by the end of March 2007.
