= David B. Chalmers Jr. =

American businessman (born 1953)

David Bay Chalmers Jr. (born 8 September 1953) was an owner of the oil refining company, Bayoil U.S.A. Inc, which operates out of Houston, Texas and a subsidiary, Bayoil Supply and Trading Ltd. in the Bahamas. The company was heavily involved in oil trading throughout the 1990s and early 2000s with the Iraqi government. In the 2004 Oil-for-Food Program Hearings, Bayoil was among the corporations investigated by the committee, and its executive David Chalmers was convicted of conspiracy to commit wire fraud. Chalmers was sentenced to two years in prison.

Chalmers' great-uncle, Charles Ulrick Bay (1888–1955), founded Bay Petroleum in 1937, later become a high-ranking intelligence official in the Office of Strategic Services, and later an ambassador to Norway. Chalmers' father, David Bay Chalmers Sr., became a well-known oil trader through the creation of Coral Petroleum (which filed for bankruptcy protection in 1983). Ben R. Pollner, who went on to found Taurus Petroleum, was one of his employees.
