= Spudshed =

Supermarket chain in Western Australia

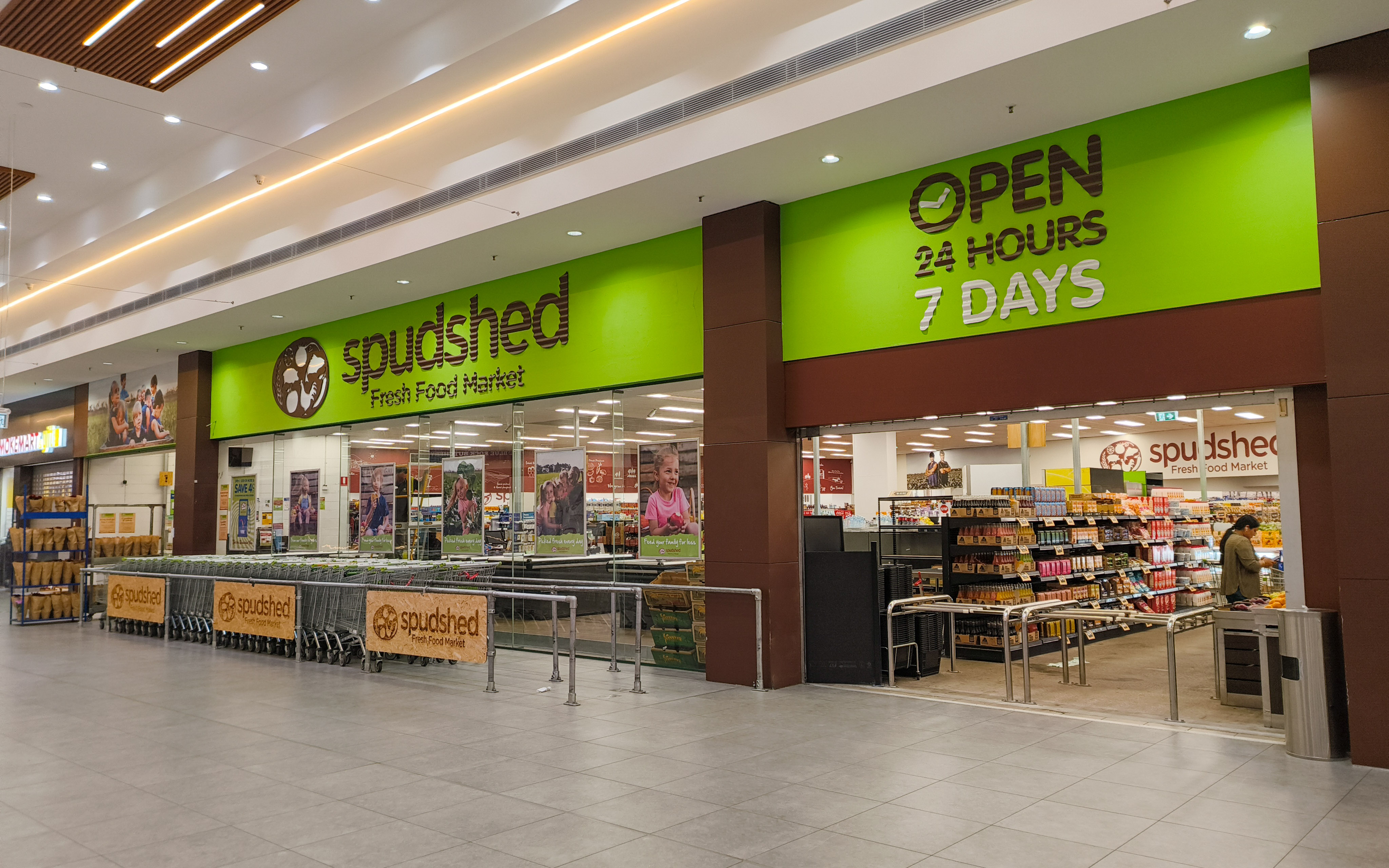
- Spudshed store in Thornlie
- Type: Private
- Industry: Agribusiness; Retail
- Founded: 1998 in Baldivis, Western Australia
- Founder: Tony and Vince Galati
- Headquarters: 10 Clarke Street, O'Connor, Western Australia, Australia
- Number of locations: 21 stores (October 2026)
- Area served: Western Australia
- Products: Fruit and vegetables, groceries, meat
- Revenue: $404 million (2020)
- Net income: $7.6 million (2020)
- Number of employees: 1154 (estimated) (June 2020)
- Website: www.spudshed.com.au

Spudshed is an independent supermarket chain in Western Australia. (Note: Spud is a colloquial term for potato in English.) The store was founded by Tony and Vince Galati, and forms part of the family-owned Galati Group.

As of October 2026, the chain comprises a total of 21 stores across Western Australia. Its main competitors are Woolworths, Coles, Aldi and IGA. Spudshed differentiates itself by operating most stores 24 hours a day, and retailing low-cost produce grown on Galati family farms throughout the state.

== History ==
The first Spudshed was opened in Baldivis in November 1998, originally as a farmers market in a shed on Galati's Baldivis property.

In September 2009, the Baldivis store burned down after an electrical fault started a fire. The store was subsequently rebuilt.

Tony Galati became a household name in Western Australia for his protracted legal battles against the Potato Marketing Corporation of Western Australia (PMC). In 2015, the PMC launched legal action against Galati, alleging that he had planted more than his allocated quota of potatoes. Prohibited from selling excess potatoes due to legal quotas, Galati used free potato giveaways at his Spudshed stores to protest against what he considered to be unfair and excessive control by the board. Galati ultimately prevailed when the state government deregulated the industry, with the PMC becoming defunct in December 2016.

In 2018, Spudshed reported profit growth of 76%, or $4 million. The battle between Tony Galati and the PMC was celebrated in a Fringe World musical in 2019, returning again in 2020.

In June 2026, a company owned by the Galati Group was fined $20,000 for building and operating an unlicensed potato chip factory in Myalup. The factory was used to manufacture "Spuddies" store brand potato chips which were introduced in Spudshed stores in 2024.

== See also ==
- List of supermarket chains in Oceania
