= Basel Institute on Governance =

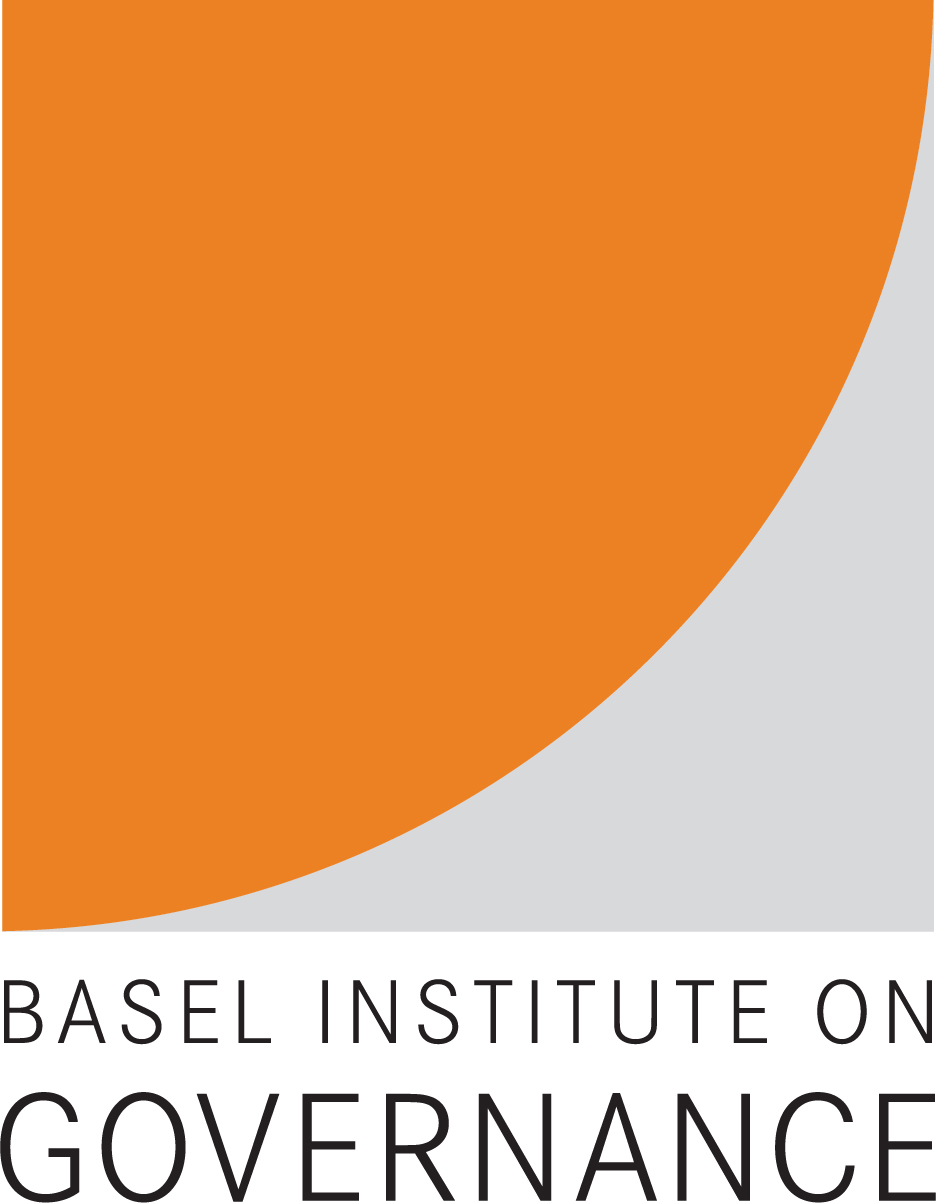
- Formation: 2003
- Founder: Mark Pieth
- Type: NGO
- Legal status: Swiss foundation
- Purpose: Anti-corruption and governance
- Headquarters: Basel, Switzerland
- Region served: Global
- Executive Director: Elizabeth Andersen
- President: Peter Maurer
- Website: www.baselgovernance.org

The Basel Institute on Governance is an independent, international non-profit organisation dedicated to preventing and combating corruption and other financial crimes and to strengthening governance around the world. The organisation was established in Basel, Switzerland in 2003 by Professor Mark Pieth.

It has a regional office for Latin America in Lima, Peru, and field staff based in several countries including in Indonesia, Latin America and Sub-Saharan Africa.

The Basel Institute is an Associated Institute of the University of Basel. It is an Institute of the United Nations Crime Prevention and Criminal Justice Programme Network.

It is known for producing the Basel AML Index, an annual ranking for measuring and comparing countries' risk of money laundering and terrorist financing.

== Structure and activities ==
The Basel Institute is registered as a Swiss foundation. It has over 150 staff (as of 2024). The organisation's activities are overseen by a Foundation Board comprising prominent experts in the fields of anti-corruption and law, from both the private sector and academia. The President of the Board is Peter Maurer and the Vice-President is Anne Peters. The Institute works with public, private, and non-governmental stakeholders through its divisions, and an international centre of excellence in asset recovery.

=== International Centre for Asset Recovery ===
The Basel Institute's International Centre for Asset Recovery (ICAR) assists partner countries in a broad spectrum of asset recovery matters with the primary aim of building the capacity of the country's institutions to trace and recover corruptly acquired assets from abroad.

It provides intensive training courses to law enforcement, financial investigators, prosecutors and the judiciary of partner countries in topics including financial investigation, mutual legal assistance, interviewing skills for investigators and money laundering using Bitcoin.

The centre also provides technical assistance on cases and legal matters in partner countries, as well as support for policy reform. It has also published an open-access book on illicit enrichment laws that target unexplained wealth, with an accompanying database of laws and guidance on proving illicit enrichment cases in court. The book is available for free in English, Spanish and French.

Core donors to ICAR are the Swiss Agency for Development and Cooperation, the UK Foreign, Commonwealth and Development Office, the Principality of Liechtenstein, the Government of Jersey and the Norwegian Agency for Development Cooperation.

=== Private Sector engagement ===
The Basel Institute supports companies and multi-stakeholder groups with advice on anti-corruption Collective Action initiatives. It hosts the B20 Collective Action Hub, an online platform for anti-corruption Collective Action resources under a mandate from the B20 group of global business leaders.

Among other initiatives, the Basel Institute has collaborated with the OECD and Transparency International to develop the High Level Reporting Mechanism, an independent mechanism to quickly resolve alerts about suspected acts of corruption in public procurement projects. It is actively engaged in research and support for other Collective Action tools such as integrity pacts with the aim of making anti-corruption Collective Action a global compliance norm.

The Siemens Integrity Initiative, a USD100 million-dollar fund created by Siemens to fight corruption and fraud through Collective Action, education and training, has supported the Basel Institute's Collective Action work with multi-year grants in all three of its funding rounds. Additional funding partners in the past and present include the Global Fund and the KBA NotaSys Integrity Fund.

In addition, the Basel Institute's Compliance specialists provide advice on anti-corruption compliance and crisis management for companies and other organisations. A notable mandate in this field was Mark Pieth's appointment in November 2011 as chairman of the Independent Governance Committee tasked with overseeing improvements to governance and transparency of FIFA.

=== Public Governance research ===
The Basel Institute's Public Governance team conducts research on the root causes of corruption, develops evidence-based anti-corruption approaches and provides training and assessments on relevant political and social aspects.

It is known in particular for its work on social norms and informal governance structures that facilitate corrupt practices. Current research in these areas includes two major projects under the DFID-funded "Global Integrity Anti-Corruption Evidence Programme" on addressing bribery in the Tanzanian health sector: a behavioural approach and harnessing informality: Designing anti-corruption network interventions and strategic use of legal instruments.

=== Public Finance Management ===
Through the Basel Institute's regional office in Peru, a team of specialists provides comprehensive support to 11 Peruvian local and regional governments to generate more effective, efficient and transparent use of public funds. The programme is funded by the Swiss State Secretariat for Economic Affairs through its economic cooperation and development programme in Peru and was extended for a second four-year term in December 2019.

=== Green Corruption programme ===
The Basel Institute implements a programme of work focused on applying anti-corruption and governance tools to environmental crimes including the illegal wildlife trade. As part of this effort, the Basel Institute partnered with the OECD on a series of public-private dialogues on topics of environmental crime, corruption and illicit trade.

== Digital tools ==
The Basel Institute develops and maintains several digital tools to support anti-corruption compliance, financial investigation and policy decisions. The tools are projects of the International Centre for Asset Recovery and are designed for use by public and private sector actors as well as policymakers and academia.

- Basel AML Index: An interactive country ranking and risk assessment tool for money laundering and terrorist financing. The public ranking has been published annually since 2012 and reveals slow progress across the board in tackling money laundering risks.
- Basel Open Intelligence: A targeted search tool for open-source research on people and organisations for compliance, due diligence and investigation.
- Basel LEARN / eLearning courses: Free self-paced online courses on asset tracing, intelligence gathering, financial analysis, international cooperation and terrorist financing, and open-source intelligence, in several languages. Some courses have been developed in collaboration with the Egmont Group of Financial Intelligence Units.
