= Claudia Rosett =

American journalist (1955–2023)

Claudia Rosett (May 29, 1955 – May 27, 2023) was an American author and journalist. An editorial board member of The Wall Street Journal, she was the only print journalist to witness the Tiananmen Square massacre and later broke the United Nations’ Oil for Food scandal, the largest public fraud in history. After her Journal career in Hong Kong, Moscow, and New York, she wrote a foreign affairs column for Forbes, blogged for PJ Media, and made regular appearances on national television and radio, including Fox Business. She also worked for the Independent Women's Forum and the London Center for Policy Research, and served as an adjunct fellow at the Hudson Institute.

== Background ==
Rosett earned a BA in English at Yale University in 1976, an MA in English at Columbia University in 1979, and an MBA at the University of Chicago in 1981.

Rosett joined The Wall Street Journal in 1984, and was named editorial page editor at The Asian Wall Street Journal in Hong Kong in 1986. In 1996, she worked in Moscow, first as a reporter for the Journal, then as Moscow Bureau Chief, before taking leave to live in India. In 1997, she returned to New York, where she served on the editorial board of The Wall Street Journal until 2002. She wrote a regular column, "The Real World,” for The Wall Street Journal Europe and OpinionJournal.com from July 2000 to December 2005.

In 1990, she received an Overseas Press Club Citation for Excellence in recognition of her on-the-scene reporting of the Tiananmen Square protests of 1989. In 1994 she broke the full story of North Korean labor camps in the Russian Far East, reporting from the camps. She also broke the U.N.'s Oil for Food scandal.

Rosett, also contributed to National Review, The New York Times, The Philadelphia Inquirer, USA Today, Commentary, The New Republic and The Weekly Standard, among others.

Rosett died on May 27, 2023, at the age of 67.

== On the United Nations ==
Rosett was a frequent critic of corruption in the United Nations. In 2004 and 2005, she wrote a series of articles exposing the corruption behind the U.N.'s Oil-for-Food program. As Michael Barone, a senior writer at U.S. News & World Report, explained:

The U.N. Oil for Food program, we learn from the reporting of Claudia Rosett in The Wall Street Journal, was a rip-off on the order of $21 billion—with money intended for hungry Iraqis going instead to Saddam Hussein and his henchmen, to bribed French and Russian businesses and, evidently, to the U.N.'s own man in charge, Benon Sevan. For this work, she was honored with the 2005 Eric Breindel Award for Excellence in Opinion Journalism and a "Mightier Pen" award from the Center for Security Policy.

In June and July 2006, Rosett covered the trial of Tongsun Park via a blog at the National Review's website.
