= Oil-for-Food Program Hearings =

Investigation sessions

The Oil-for-Food Program Hearings were held by the U.S Senate Permanent Subcommittee on Investigations beginning in 2004 to investigate abuses of the United Nations (UN) Oil-for-Food Programme in which the economically sanctioned country of Iraq was intended to be able to sell limited amounts of oil in exchange for vital food and medicine for its population.

In December 2004, the subcommittee's chairman Senator Norm Coleman called for UN Secretary-general Kofi Annan to resign because of the "UN's utter failure to detect or stop Saddam's abuses" of the program and because of related fraud allegations against Annan's son.

In May 2005, the subcommittee held the hearings on their investigation of abuses of the program, including oil smuggling, illegal kickbacks and use of surcharges, and Saddam Hussein's use of oil vouchers for the purpose of buying influence abroad. These hearings covered certain corporations and several well-known political figures, including Russia's Vladimir Zhirinovsky and drew significant media attention for the combative appearance of British politician George Galloway, an anti-Iraq-War member of parliament for RESPECT The Unity Coalition (Respect), who vigorously denied the subcommittee's allegations against him and said they were politically motivated.

U.S. oil company Bayoil was among the corporations investigated by the committee, and its executive David Chalmers was convicted of conspiracy to commit wire fraud.

== Alleged US corporate complicity ==
It has been alleged that the American government was aware of the scandal and chose to not prevent the smuggling because their allies Turkey and Jordan benefited from the majority of the smuggled oil. US Senator Carl Levin (D-Michigan) was quoted in an interview for the New York Times as saying, "There is no question that the bulk of the illicit oil revenues came from the open sale of Iraqi oil to Jordan and to Turkey, and that that was a way of going around the Oil-for-Food Programme [and that] we were fully aware of the bypass and looked the other way."

== Galloway testimony ==
Next to testify was the British Member of Parliament for Bethnal Green and Bow, George Galloway. Senator Coleman accused Galloway of receiving money from oil deals in Iraq, stating: "We have your name on Iraqi documents, some prepared before the fall of Saddam, some after, that identify you as one of the allocation holders." Galloway responded "Senator, I am not now nor have I ever been an oil trader....", stating that the charges were false and part of a diversionary "mother of all smoke screens" by pro-Iraq-War U.S. politicians to deflect attention from the "theft of billions of dollars of Iraq's wealth... on your watch" that had occurred not during the Oil-for-Food program but under the post-invasion Coalition Provisional Authority by "Halliburton and other American corporations... with the connivance of your own government."

Galloway claimed that the subcommittee's dossier was full of distortions and rudimentary mistakes, citing, for example, the charge that he had "many meetings" with Saddam Hussein when they had met twice. He also challenged the claim that he was "an outspoken supporter of the Hussein regime" and provided evidence from the British parliamentary record Hansard, dating back to 1990 of him condemning Hussein. The unusual appearance of a British MP before a US Senate committee drew much media attention in both America and Britain.

The Majority Staff of the subcommittee prepared a subsequent report pertaining to Galloway, which was released in October 2005. It elaborated on allegations and evidence of the committee and included disputed testimony from former Iraqi foreign minister Tariq Aziz. It also alleged that another officer of Mariam Appeal, Amineh Abu-Zayyad (Galloway's then-wife), received $150,000 in oil kickbacks, which she denied. Senator Coleman conveyed these reports to the U.S. Department of Justice, the Manhattan DA, the Washington DC and New York federal prosecutors, the UK Parliamentary Commissioner for Standards, and the Charity Commission. None saw fit to pursue charges.

== Australian Wheat Board Involvement ==
The subcommittee considered and may have done some preliminary work to investigate Australian Wheat Board (AWB) in connection with Oil-for-Food Program abuses. The Australian ambassador to the U.S., Michael Thawley, met with Sen. Coleman in late 2004 to lobby against any investigation of AWB. On June 2, 2006, Coleman responded to criticism that he had insufficiently investigated them by saying that there were legal and cost hurdles. Iowa Senator Tom Harkin and others had claimed it was a political favor being paid back. The Australian Prime Minister John Howard was a supporter of the invasion of Iraq.

== Indictments and conviction ==
On January 6, 2006, South Korean businessman Tongsun Park was arrested by the FBI in Houston after he was indicted for illegally accepting millions of dollars from Iraq in the UN Oil-for-Food Programme. The criminal charges against him were unsealed in a U.S. District Court in Manhattan. In July 2006, he was convicted on conspiracy charges. He became the first person convicted through the oil-for-food investigation. On February 22, 2007 he was sentenced to five years in prison. He was also fined $15,000 and required to forfeit $1,200,000.

On January 16, 2007, former UN official Benon Sevan was indicted by a Manhattan federal prosecutor for taking about $160,000 in bribes. Michael J. Garcia, the U.S. attorney from the Southern District of New York, issued a warrant through Interpol for the arrest of Sevan at his home in Cyprus, as well as a warrant for Efraim "Fred" Nadler, a New York businessman who was indicted on charges of channelling the illegal payments to Sevan. Nadler's whereabouts are unknown.

== See also ==
- Cole Inquiry – Australian Royal Commission
