= Tony Galati =

Australian businessman (born 1961)

Antonino Galati (born 1 April 1961) is an Australian businessman. He is the co-founder of Spudshed, a supermarket chain in Western Australia.

== Life and career ==
Tony Galati is the eldest son of Sicilian migrants Francesco and Carmela Galati. His father was from Tortorici and his mother was from Agrigento. After emigrating to Australia in 1954, they settled in Yangebup, south of Perth. He has two brothers (Vince and Sam) and two sisters (Maria and Carolina). Galati attended Spearwood Primary School and Hamilton Senior High School. He left high school in Year 10 to do farmwork.

His family started a 2-hectare (4.9-acre) market garden in Spearwood in the 1960s. As a child, Galati and his brothers would help his parents in the market garden before school. From around 12 years old, he helped with managing the business' accounting as his father did not speak English. He later became a fruit and vegetable manager then a purchasing officer for Coles. He was involved with wholesale fruit and vegetable markets for around four years. Galati and other family members established an independent growers market called Spudshed in 1998 after purchasing farm land in Wattleup and Baldivis.

Galati has three sons and a daughter. He divorced his first wife in the 2000s after a 22 year marriage. Galati became a household name in Western Australia for his protracted legal battles against the Potato Marketing Corporation of Western Australia (PMC). In 2015, the PMC launched legal action against Galati, alleging that he had planted more than his allocated quota of potatoes. Prohibited from selling excess potatoes due to legal quotas, Galati used free potato giveaways at Spudshed stores to protest against what he considered to be unfair and excessive control by the board. Galati ultimately prevailed when the state government deregulated the industry, with the PMC becoming defunct in December 2016.

The battle between Galati and the PMC was celebrated in a Fringe World musical in 2019 and 2020. In mid-2021, Galati purchased a mansion in Mosman Park for $6.2 million. Galati raised more than $300,000 for the Channel Seven Perth Telethon in October 2021 by shaving his trademark thick eyebrows.
