= Cole Inquiry =

Australian Royal Commission

- Also known as: AWB oil-for-wheat scandal
- Outcome: 5 Recommendations in the Final Report
- Inquiries: UN Independent Inquiry Committee (Volcker Inquiry); Royal Commission of Inquiry into certain Australian companies in relation to the UN Oil-For-Food Programme (Cole Inquiry)
- Commissioner: Justice Terence Cole AO RFD QC
- Inquiry period: 10 November 2005 – 27 November 2006
- Constituting instrument: Royal Commissions Act 1902
- Website: www.oilforfoodinquiry.gov.au

The Cole Inquiry, formally the Inquiry into certain Australian companies in relation to the UN Oil-For-Food Programme, was a Royal Commission established by the Australian government pursuant to the Royal Commissions Act 1902 to investigate "whether decisions, actions, conduct or payments by Australian companies mentioned in the Volcker Inquiry into the United Nations Oil-for-Food Programme breached any Federal, State or Territory law."

The inquiry commenced on 10 November 2005 and was overseen by a sole Royal Commissioner, Justice Terence Cole AO RFD QC. Justice Cole handed the commission's five volume report to the Governor-General on 24 November 2006; and the report was tabled in parliament on 27 November 2006.

== Background ==
The Volcker Inquiry was set up to investigate the systematic corruption of the Oil-for-Food Programme (or Program) by the Arab nationalist and Arab socialist government of the fifth President of Iraq, Saddam Hussein.

=== The Volcker Inquiry ===
The United Nations Independent Inquiry Committee was formed to investigate allegations of corruption and fraud in the UN Oil-for-Food Programme. In exchange for trouble-free disembarkation of wheat purchased under the Oil for food program, AWB paid 'trucking charges' totaling A$300 million to Alia, a Jordanian trucking company. Volcker found that Alia kept a small percentage of the 'charges', and passed the remainder to the government of Saddam Hussein. An accompanying statement released with the report by the Secretary-General of the United Nations, Kofi Annan requested that "national authorities take steps to prevent the recurrence of such practices in the future and that they take action, where appropriate, against companies falling within their jurisdiction".

=== Establishment of the Cole Inquiry ===
In response to Volcker's findings, the Australian Government established a Royal Commission to further investigate the claims raised by the UN report. By Letters Patent issued on 10 November 2005 the commission was asked to inquire into and report on:

1. whether any decision, action, conduct, payment or writing of any of the three Australian companies mentioned in the Final Report ("Manipulation of the Oil-for-Food Programme by the Iraqi Regime") of the Independent Inquiry Committee into the United Nations Oil-for-Food Programme, or any person associated with one of those companies, might have constituted a breach of any law of the Commonwealth, a State or Territory; and
2. if so, whether the question of criminal or other legal proceedings should be referred to the relevant Commonwealth, State or Territory agency.

== Commissioner and Counsel ==
The Royal Commissioner was Justice Terence Cole AO RFD QC, a former Judge of Appeal of the Supreme Court of New South Wales. The Cole Inquiry was the second Royal Commission where Justice Cole was the sole Commissioner. The 2001–2003 Royal Commission into the Building and Construction Industry is commonly referred to as the Cole Royal Commission hence to avoid confusion the 2005–06 Royal Commission is commonly referred to as the Cole Inquiry.

Cole was supported by John Agius SC, Counsel Assisting and three other barristers, Gregory Nell, Michael Wigney and Miles Condon.

The three Australian companies adversely mentioned in the UN report (AWB, Alkaloids of Australia Pty Ltd, and Rhine Ruhr Pty Ltd) were granted leave to be represented by counsel before the Royal Commission

== Hearings ==
Prior to the public hearings the commission held a series of closed hearings in December 2005 and January 2006. Some witnesses who were examined in the closed hearings also gave evidence in the public hearings.

The commission's public hearings commenced on 16 January 2006. During the first six weeks of public hearings evidence led by Agius and cross examination by him of witnesses brought out a series of revelations that showed the conduct of AWB's executives and directors in a very poor light. Apart from interrupting assisting counsel's question to ask witnesses his own probing questions, Cole frequently made reproving comments about the behaviour and evidence of witnesses particularly those in responsible and often highly remunerative positions with AWB and the Wheat Export Authority, who among other things frequently claimed memory loss, inability to locate diaries and notes and notoriously, in the case of former AWB board chairman Trevor Flugge, hearing loss.

On 6 February 2006 the inquiry's terms of reference were extended to include the activities of BHP Billiton in relation to the Oil for Food Program.

On 16 February 2006 Commissioner Cole invited broadcast media into the inquiry's hearing room to record an invitation to anyone with information about kickbacks or the Iraqi oil-for-food scandal to appear before his inquiry. Cole emphasised that this appeal applied to anyone saying: "I am extending a specific invitation to any Member of Parliament, any member of the media, any public servant, or any member of the public who believes that they have information relevant to this aspect of the inquiry to provide any such information to those assisting me".

On 2 March 2006 counsel assisting, John Agius, threatened to serve search warrants on AWB following claims of memory lapses and loss of documents by a former company manager, Andrew McConville. This was countered by counsel for AWB who suggested that the search for documents by the company was being conducted in a rigorous manner and at considerable expense.

On 3 March 2006, Cole applied for the inquiry's terms of reference to be amended to extend the period of the inquiry for up to two months (i.e. from the end of March to May 2006). Prime Minister John Howard indicated the government's agreement to this request two days later.

Howard was asked to write and submit a statement in regard to this matter, and was cross examined on 13 April for 53 minutes. Howard previously stated to a media conference held in Sydney, "If asked I will naturally be happy to appear." "I've said all along that this is an utterly transparent process, which is not protecting the Government, which is designed to get to the truth of this matter and I am more than happy to comply with the request made by the commission."

== Outcome ==
On 28 August 2009 the Australian Federal Police (AFP) decided to drop its investigation into the scandal in which wheat exporter AWB was found to have been funding the Iraqi regime in breach of UN sanctions. It was found that it was not even clear that breaching a UN sanction is a criminal offence and a conviction "was not in the public interest". The decision means no former employee or director of AWB will face criminal charges, although an investigation by corporate watchdog Australian Securities & Investments Commission continued. The AFP announced that the decision to drop the investigation was made after a review of the evidence by senior barrister Paul Hastings QC, who declared the prospect of convictions was limited and "not in the public interest".

In 2009, The Australian reported "It has hardly been a secret that the AFP investigation was under-funded and under-resourced, and it received little co-operation from AWB, which sees itself as a new entity, with all staff associated with the corrupt dealings having left." Hastings told the AFP that in his opinion there was no reasonable prospect of a conviction. It was not even clear that breaching a UN sanction is a criminal offence.

== See also ==
- Oil-for-Food Program Hearings
- AWB Oil-for-Wheat Scandal
