= Mark Pieth =

Swiss defence lawyer (born 1953)

Mark Pieth (Note: Sometimes Marc Pieth) (born 9 March 1953) is a defence lawyer. He has worked as Professor of Criminal Law at the University of Basel, Switzerland and a prominent anti-corruption expert.

Pieth's career as a legal expert, defence lawyer, judge and compliance advisor includes several roles on the international stage, such as a member of the Financial Action Task Force on Money Laundering, Chair of a United Nations Intergovernmental Expert Group on illicit drug trafficking and 24 years as Chair of the OECD Working Group on Bribery, which monitors the OECD Anti-Bribery Convention.

He is known for spearheading initiatives to combat corruption and money laundering in all its forms through regulations, country monitoring, compliance, advocacy and arbitration. In the field of commodities, he was appointed by the UN Secretary General Kofi Annan to the Independent Inquiry Committee into the Iraq Oil-for-Food Programme.

He served as President of the Basel Institute on Governance from 2003 to 2020, a research and policy institute he founded to help combat public and private sector abuses of power. Since 2020 he opened a law firm specialized in international cases.

== Publications ==
Over the last 17 years, Mark Pieth has authored or edited 34 books in the fields of economic and organised crime, corruption, money laundering and criminal law. The ones in English include:

- Pieth, Mark, Lucinda A. Low, and Nicola Bonucci. The OECD Convention on Bribery: A Commentary : a Commentary on the Convention on Combating Bribery of Foreign Public Officials in International Business Transactions of 21 November 1997. Cambridge: Cambridge University Press, 2014.
- Pieth, Mark. Financing Terrorism. Dordrecht: Springer, 2011.
- Pieth, Mark,(editor) and Eva Joly. Recovering stolen assets. Bern ]: Peter Lang, 2008.
- Pieth, Mark, and Gemma Aiolfi. A Comparative Guide to Anti-Money Laundering: A Critical Analysis of Systems in Singapore, Switzerland, the UK and the USA. Cheltenham: Elgar, 2004.

Recent publications aimed the general public include:

- Pieth, Mark; Heimann, Fritz (2017). Confronting Corruption: Past Concerns, Present Challenges, and Future Strategies. Oxford University Press.
- Pieth, Mark (2019). Gold Laundering: The Dirty Secrets of the Gold Trade - And How to Clean Up. Salis.

Footnotes
