= Paul Volcker Committee =

Committee to investigate the United Nations Oil for food program in Iraq

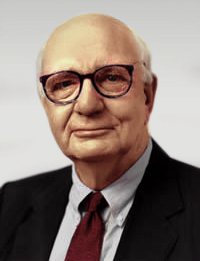
Paul Volcker Committee

The Paul Volcker Committee (Independent Inquiry Committee) was formed to investigate alleged corruption and fraud in the United Nations Oil-for-Food Programme in Iraq.

The committee was appointed by UN Secretary-General Kofi Annan in April 2004, following calls for a Security Council inquiry, which was approved in Resolution 1538. The three-member inquiry was chaired by former Federal Reserve chairman and United Nations Association of the United States of America director Paul Volcker. The other members of the inquiry were South African Justice Richard Goldstone and Swiss Professor of Criminal Law Mark Pieth. The committee's 60 members of staff, which included three support personnel on loan from the UN, operated on a $30 million budget drawn from the UN Oil-for-Food escrow account.

The Independent Inquiry Committee (IIC) into the United Nations Oil-for-Food Programme released its interim report during February 2005.

== See also ==
- Oil-for-Food Program Hearings
