= Oilexco =

Oilexco Incorporated (TSX: OIL, LON: OIL) was an oil and gas exploration and production company. The company's producing properties and exploration activities were located in the United Kingdom Central North Sea, specifically in the Outer Moray Firth and Central Graben areas. In June 2007, oil production commenced from the company's first operated offshore field developments, the 100% owned Brenda Field and the 70% owned Nicol fields. The company had a wholly owned subsidiary, Oilexco North Sea Limited (ONSL), which is based in Aberdeen, Scotland. The company entered administration in early 2009 and ONSL was eventually bought over by independent British oil company Premier Oil in June 2009.

== History ==
Oilexco was founded in 1994 and currently trades on the over-the-counter exchange (OTCBB) under the symbol "OILXF". On 8 September 2006 Oilexco was added to the TSX Composite Index. Their first day of trading as part of the index was 18 September 2006. On 29 June 2007 their shares began trading on the main market of the LSE.

== Problems at Oilexco North Sea Limited ==
On 7 January 2009, Oilexco North Sea Limited filed for administration due to financial constraints facing its North Sea operations.

On 25 March 2009, it was announced that Premier Oil has proposed an acquisition of Oilexco North Sea Limited for $505m (£346m), launching a rights issue for £171m and securing bank loans to fund the acquisition.

== Saddam's oil vouchers ==
The company received 1 million barrels worth of oil vouchers in the United Nations Oil-for-Food Programme, according to the paper "The Beneficiaries of Saddam's Oil Vouchers: The List of 270".
