= Export Wheat Commission =

Former Australian authority

The Export Wheat Commission (EWC) was a statutory authority of the Australian government. The EWC was established on 1 October 2007 and superseded the Wheat Export Authority (WEA). The EWC was a statutory commission operating under the Financial Management and Accountability Act 1997.

== Funding and role ==
The EWC's role was determined by the Wheat Marketing Act 1989 (the Act) and its operations were funded from three sources:

1. Wheat Export Charge In June 2003, the Wheat Marketing Act 1989 was amended to make provision for the introduction of a Wheat Export Charge (WEC) on all Australian wheat exports. The WEC came into effect by regulation on 1 October 2003 and was set at 22 cents per tonne. It remained at that level during the reporting period. Income provided by the WEC for the EWC in 2007–08 was AUD1,191 million (representing 33% of total funding requirements) compared with AUD2.208 million (61%) in 2006–07, and AUD3.321 million (97%) in 2005–06. The Primary Industries (Customs) Charges Regulations 2000, made under the Primary Industries (Customs) Charges Act 1999, provided for the collection of the WEC. The WEC was collected by the Department of Agriculture, Fisheries and Forestry's Levy and Revenue Service which charged the EWC for the administration of its collection and disbursement and exporter payment compliance. This service cost AUD1,660 per month in 2007–08, compared with AUD1,830 per month in 2006–07 and AUD2,080 in 2005–06.

2. Export Application Fee In August 2003, an amendment to the Wheat Marketing Regulations 1990 established a AUD50 fee on all export consent applications. This made up a minor proportion of EWC income. During 2007–08 export application fees amounted to AUD950, compared to AUD15,000 in both 2006–07 and 2005–06.

3. Additional Funding As income through the WEC was significantly reduced due to the drought and reduced wheat exports in 2006–07, the Government provided a grant of AUD2 million in September 2007 to allow the agency to continue operating until 31 March 2008. This grant covered ongoing operational costs and the transition from the former Wheat Export Authority to the EWC. The EWC's financial position was transferred to Wheat Exports Australia on 1 July 2008 under the Wheat Export Marketing Act 2008.

The EWC facilitated the operations of Australia's legislated wheat export arrangements and informed Government and growers of outcomes.

The EWC:

- controlled the export of bulk wheat from Australia;
- monitored and reported on AWB International's performance in relation to the export of wheat from the National Pool (also referred to as the single desk marketing system);
- monitored compliance with the conditions of export consents;
- administered the Non-bulk Wheat Quality Assurance Scheme; and
- managed operations efficiently and effectively, consistent with corporate governance principles, and
- informed stakeholders of its activities.

The EWC assumed responsibility for the role of the former Wheat Export Authority to monitor and report on Australia's single desk wheat export arrangements, under which AWB (International) Ltd (AWB(I)) was given a near monopoly on exporting wheat, in particular bulk exports. The 2007/08 National Pool was the last one to be managed by AWBI.

== Overview ==
The Export Wheat Commission (EWC) was established as an Australian Government statutory authority on 1 October 2007, under the Wheat Marketing Act 1989 (the Act) after legislative changes in June 2007. This Overview is based on the EWC's Corporate Plan 2007–08 and the Portfolio Budget Statement 2008–09.

=== Vision ===
The EWC vision was for a sustainable, innovative and internationally competitive wheat export sector that continued to provide optimal returns for growers and develop Australia's broader interests.

=== Mission ===
The EWC facilitated the operations of Australia's legislated wheat export arrangements and informed Government and growers of outcomes.

=== About ===
The EWC was an Australian Government agency within the Agriculture, Fisheries and Forestry portfolio. It operated under the Financial Management and Accountability Act 1997 and was required to meet related financial management and reporting requirements. EWC staff were employed under the Public Service Act 1999. The EWC comprised a Chairman and four other Commissioners, appointed for a period of up to three years by the Minister for Agriculture, Fisheries and Forestry. The Commissioners were supported by a Secretariat which comprised up to 16 full-time staff headed by a Chief Executive Officer (CEO). The Commissioners were responsible for fulfilling the statutory requirements of the EWC. The Secretariat assisted the Commissioners in meeting their obligations. The Commissioners carried out major decision-making functions and provided guidance to the Acting CEO who had delegated authority to undertake many of the functions and responsibilities of the EWC. Day-to-day control over core areas of EWC activity rested with a small executive team who worked closely with Secretariat staff.

=== Primary functions ===
Under the Act the EWC had three functions:

- to control the export of wheat from Australia (other than the export of wheat in bags or containers)
- to monitor AWB International Limited's (AWBI's) performance in relation to the export of wheat and examine and report on the benefits to growers that result from that performance
- to undertake such other functions as administered by the Commission — such as the Non-bulk Wheat Quality Assurance Scheme, that commenced on 27 August 2007.

=== Operations ===
In delivering those functions the EWC:

- provided assurance to stakeholders that the export performance of AWBI and the returns to growers were independently and accurately monitored
- increased stakeholder awareness and confidence in the performance monitoring of AWBI
- received and independently assessed bulk wheat export applications from non-AWBI exporters, and made recommendations to the Minister
- granted export consents as directed by the Minister
- monitored and reported on non-AWBI exporter compliance with the conditions of export consents
- responded to stakeholder needs and changes in the EWC's operating environment and contributed to the ongoing development of Australia's wheat export arrangements
- managed operations effectively, consistent with Australian Government corporate governance principles, and sought to inform stakeholders about the EWC and its activities.

== People ==
=== The Minister ===
Under the Act, the EWC was required to provide the Minister with a report on its monitoring of AWBI's export performance and the impact on growers. Known as the Performance Monitoring Report (PMR), it contained considerable commercial-inconfidence information. With the late closing of the 2005/06 National Pool, the EWC produced a 2007 PMR Addendum report to the Minister.

The EWC was also required to notify the Minister of significant wheat export related events and to keep the Minister informed on the EWC's operations. The EWC also provided the Minister with a Corporate Plan and an Annual Operational Plan (AOP) during the year. The EWC presented the Annual Report 2006–07 for the former Wheat Export Authority to the Minister who tabled it in Parliament on 13 May 2008.

Under the Act, the Minister held the power of veto over bulk wheat exports until 30 June 2008. The EWC processed applications to export wheat in bulk in line with the published Export Consent Guidelines and referred these to the Minister for decision.

=== Growers ===
The EWC reported to growers on the non commercial-in-confidence findings of the PMR activity through the Growers Report. The Growers Report was published on the EWC website and mailed to more than 25,000 growers. In addition, with the late closing of the 2005/06 National Pool, the EWC published the Growers Report 2007 Addendum which was similarly distributed to growers.

=== Stakeholders ===
Beyond meeting its legislated requirements to the Minister and growers, the EWC was also committed to delivering and communicating results to other stakeholders in Australia's wheat export arrangements. The EWC's key stakeholders were:

- the Minister for Agriculture, Fisheries and Forestry
- Australian wheat growers
- AWB International Ltd
- Australian wheat exporters.

Other stakeholders included:

- grower bodies, such as the Grains Council of Australia (GCA) and the Grain Growers

Association (GGA)

- State grain merchant associations (representing small to medium grain businesses)
- various industry and exporter organisations, such as the Australian Grain Exporters

Association (AGEA)

- large and small exporters
- independent grain consultants
- other Australian Government departments and agencies with an interest in the grain industry and related transport and export arrangements.

== Non-bulk Wheat Quality Assurance Scheme ==
By 30 June 2008 the EWC had accredited:

- 62 packing companies (in 103 locations in five States)
- 12 laboratories (in 31 locations)
- 6 superintendence companies (in 18 locations).

By 30 June 2008, the EWC had received 4,094 notification forms for the export of 1,929,293 tonnes to 41 countries.

The EWC's performance also included the following results:

- The development of an online service enabling wheat exporters to electronically submit their notification forms and contracts to the EWC. This streamlined the notification process and reduced processing time for both the EWC and the exporter, and enabled exporters to forward the information to packers and laboratories.
- Following deregulation, non-bulk exporters were able to export wheat in containers to overseas customers that they were previously unable to supply under the former export consent application arrangements.
- This also meant exporters could better align grain quality with specific customer requirements.
- Some non-bulk exporters developed stronger links with growers

== New directions ==
The November 2007 Federal election resulted in a change of Government and reform of Australia's wheat marketing arrangements towards the liberalisation of exports in bulk. This reform included the release of draft legislation and a Senate Committee Inquiry into the Wheat Export Marketing Bill 2008 and the Wheat Export Marketing (Repeal and Consequential Amendments) Bill 2008. The related drafting of a new Wheat Export Accreditation Scheme for bulk exports, became a major focus for the EWC and the industry during the reporting period.

The EWC monitored and reported on AWBI's export performance in managing the National Pool and presented the Minister with two Performance Monitoring Reports (PMRs) and published two Growers Reports.

This was a significant result as the Act only required the EWC to produce one performance monitoring report to the Minister and one related report to growers during the year.

=== Legislative change ===
On 5 March 2008, the Minister released an exposure draft of the Wheat Export Marketing Bill 2008. The EWC was required to undertake considerable preliminary work on new governance and other arrangements in the lead-up to the establishment of the new body, Wheat Exports Australia.

The changes presented new challenges for the EWC, including a requirement to draft a legislative instrument to create an accreditation scheme for bulk exporters. The EWC consulted widely with industry in formulating the Wheat Export Accreditation Scheme (Bulk-Scheme), undertaking preliminary consultations in March and then releasing an exposure draft of the Scheme in June.

In June 2008, the Government passed legislation in Parliament that reformed the export of wheat in bulk, ending the wheat export monopoly arrangement held by AWBI since privatisation of the Australian Wheat Board in 1999.

== Other outcomes ==
The EWC significantly improved its performance in all areas of its ongoing business while successfully meeting the new demands of the legislative changes and without undue disruption to the export wheat industry.

The EWC continued to refine its business processes in its key functional areas of bulk export consents, administration the Non-bulk Wheat Quality Assurance Scheme (Non-bulk Scheme) and the performance monitoring of AWBI. At the direction of the Minister, the EWC also completed three Ministerial investigations during the reporting period.

During 2007–08, the EWC received and assessed a total of 54 applications for bulk exports, consulting with AWBI and providing detailed comments and recommendations to the Minister. The Minister approved six applications for 950,000 tonnes in five markets. The EWC ensured that its consent compliance requirements for bulk wheat exports were met by exporters.

Following the liberalisation of wheat exports in containers and bags on 27 August 2007, the EWC administered the Non-bulk Scheme and during the reporting period, accredited 62 packers with 103 sites, 12 laboratories with 31 sites and six superintendence companies with 18 sites.

The EWC also processed and checked more than 4,000 packer notifications of exports in bags and containers and ensured they complied with the Non-bulk Scheme.

The EWC liaised with industry and grower organisations in relation to the Non-bulk Scheme during the year and introduced a new online notification form to increase efficiency for users as well as the EWC.

The EWC also continued to liaise with the Australian Customs Service and non-AWBI exporters on compliance with non-bulk export consents given by the former Wheat Export Authority prior to deregulation.

=== Ministerial directions ===
During the previous reporting period, 1 October 2006 to 30 September 2007, the Minister had directed the former Wheat Export Authority to conduct one investigation under section 5DC of the Act. The EWC presented two interim reports and then delivered its final report on the investigation to the Minister on 14 December 2007. During the reporting period the Minister gave the EWC directions to undertake two further investigations (see page 59). While these placed additional requirements on the Secretariat, I am pleased to advise that these were concluded in an efficient and timely manner. The EWC presented its findings to the Minister in two confidential reports.

=== Performance monitoring ===
Due to the late closure of the 2005/06 National Pool, the EWC produced two reports on the performance of AWBI instead of the required one. The EWC delivered the 2007 PMR to the Minister in December 2007, in accordance with its requirements under the Act. This 177-page report was adapted into a 28-page report to growers, with the commercial-in-confidence elements removed. The EWC subsequently produced a 108-page commercial-in-confidence Addendum to the PMR and then published a 20-page Addendum to the Growers Report 2007 during 2007–08 to inform the Minister and growers on the performance of AWBI and a number of other topical wheat industry issues.

Drought had a major impact on growers and exporters during the 2007/08 harvest which yielded 13.04 million tonnes, although this was 2.23 million tonnes above the 2006/07 harvest.

The EWC statistics showed that approximately 5.4 million tonnes of wheat were exported during 2007/08. Western Australia and South Australia were the major wheat exporting States.

On 1 July 2008, following the passage of legislative change, the EWC was replaced by Wheat Exports Australia.
