= Benon Sevan =

Cypriot international diplomat (1937–2026)

- Բենոն Սևան

Assistant Secretary-General in the UN Department of Political Affairs
- In office 20 July 1992 – 7 August 2005
- Appointed by: Boutros Boutros-Ghali

Personal details
- Born: Benin Vahe Sevan; 18 December 1937 Nicosia, British Cyprus
- Died: 5 October 2026 (aged 88) Cyprus
- Children: 1 daughter
- Education: Columbia University
- Occupation: Diplomat
- Known for: Oil-for-Food corruption

Benon Vahe Sevan (Armenian: Բենոն Վահե Սևան; 18 December 1937 – 5 October 2026) was a Cypriot international diplomat who was head of the United Nations' Oil-for-Food Programme, established in 1996 and charged with preventing Baathist Iraq's government from using the proceeds from oil exports for anything but food, medicine and other items to benefit the civilian population.

== Life and career ==
Born into an Armenian-Cypriot family in Nicosia, British Cyprus, Sevan was educated at the prestigious Melkonian Educational Institute in Nicosia. He obtained a BA in History and Philosophy at Columbia College, New York City, and a further degree from the School of International and Public Affairs at Columbia University.

Sevan joined the United Nations in 1965 and worked in among other places, for a U.N.-administered plebiscite in West Irian, as well as on issues related to prisoners of war in the Iran-Iraq War. From 1982 to March 1988, Sevan was Secretary of the United Nations Economic and Social Council (ECOSOC). In April 1988, he was appointed director and senior political advisor to the Secretary-General's representative on the Afghan conflict. In January 1991, the Secretary-General appointed him to head the Office coordinating humanitarian aid to Afghanistan. On 15 April 1992, as Afghan president Mohammad Najibullah readied his resignation amidst the collapse of his government, Sevan flew alone to Kabul to escort Najibullah into exile. However, as Najibullah approached the airport, his car was blocked by militia forces loyal to Abdul Rashid Dostum. Najibullah quickly backtracked into the city and took refuge at the Kabul UN compound (where he was to remain for the next four years, until the Taliban took control and killed him).

Later in July 1992, he was named Assistant Secretary-General in the UN Department of Political Affairs. But Sevan came to world attention as investigations began into the Oil-for-Food Programme. Sevan reportedly accepted bribes from Saddam Hussein in the form of oil vouchers, and allowed Saddam to garner $11 billion for military and other uses which violated the UN sanctions against his regime, even as Sevan tried to persuade the United Nations Security Council to make concessions to the Iraqi regime.

On 19 August 2003, Sevan was wounded in the Canal Hotel Bombing in Baghdad.

On 7 February 2005, United Nations Secretary-General Kofi Annan suspended Sevan and another UN official with pay ($1 per year plus benefits, including diplomatic immunity from prosecution) because of their roles in the fraud. On 8 August 2005, a UN-appointed panel, led by Paul Volcker, published a report on its investigation into the scandal. In the report, the panel concluded that Sevan had accepted bribes from the former Iraqi regime and recommended that his UN immunity be lifted, to allow for a criminal investigation. Sevan had resigned from the UN on 7 August 2005, just one day before the report was due to be published.

In October 2005, it was reported he had fled the U.S. and returned to his native Cyprus. The extradition treaty between the U.S. and Cyprus did not require Cyprus to send Sevan to the United States.

Sevan was married with one daughter. He died on 5 October 2026, at the age of 88.
