= Potato Marketing Corporation of Western Australia =

- Formerly: Western Potatoes
- Company type: Statutory body
- Industry: Potato
- Founded: 1946
- Defunct: 2016
- Headquarters: Perth
- Area served: Western Australia
- Services: Marketing, research, licensing
- Parent: Government of Western Australia
- Website: pmc.wa.gov.au

The Potato Marketing Corporation of Western Australia (PMC) was a statutory corporation founded by the Government of Western Australia pursuant to the Marketing of Potatoes Act 1946. It was charged with managing the supply of fresh table potatoes in Western Australia. The statutory corporation operated to ensure licensed growers supplied potatoes year round to the WA consumer market. The corporation was self-funded by revenue from licence fees and did not receive financial support from the state government. The agency dictated the varieties and volume in the WA potato market.

== History ==
The statutory marketing body was created in 1946. The PMC had 78 licensed growers in its books as of 2014. They used to output 50 000 tonnes of potatoes to the market. In 2004, there were 151 growers. Further consolidation of growers is expected as the market changes due to technology and market pressures.

The PMC had a high-profile dispute with Tony Galati of the Spudshed supermarket chain. In 1998, the PMC refused to accept trucks of potatoes from Galati for not arriving on time. Galati proceeded to give the potatoes away for free whilst calling for the regulatory agency to be scrapped and allow free competition. The campaign succeeded in 2015 when the state government confirmed it would abolish the agency within two years.

The President of the Potato Growers Association of WA, Dean Ryan was opposed to scrapping the agency and claimed it would put growers out of business. This came from the Harper Competition Policy Review and also the Economic Regulation Authority of WA which points to this as a case study of regulation restricting competition. The Potato Growers Association of WA launched a new website to counter criticism from those in favour of scrapping the board.

== Abolition ==
The passage of the Marketing of Potatoes Amendment and Repeal Act 2016 in September amended the Marketing of Potatoes Act 1946 to abolish the PMC on 31 December 2016 and to provide transitional provisions as to its winding up.

== Varieties ==
The PMC approved the following varieties of potatoes that growers could grow.

- Carlington
- Delaware
- Desiree
- Eureka
- Kestrel
- Kipfler
- Mondial
- Nadine
- Royal Blue
- Ruby Lou
- White Star

== See also ==
- Potato Council
- Single desk
