= Andrew Lindberg =

Australian businessman (born 1953)

Andrew Alexander Lindberg (born 29 April 1953) is an Australian businessman.

From 2000 until February 2006, he held the positions of managing director and board member of AWB Limited. He resigned from these positions in the wake of his appearance at the Cole Inquiry. Despite "the trial by media" that occurred throughout the inquiry, in November 2006, he was exonerated. But this revelation came too late, as the reputation of Lindberg, AWB and many other parties involved, had already been tainted. Despite being cleared by the Cole Inquiry, Andrew was pursued by ASIC. The Judge in charge of the case has criticised ASIC for its conduct in relation to their charges against Lindberg and the long protracted proceedings. Lindberg was eventually fined and banned from managing a company for one year for his role in the scandal.

Prior to that, he had been Chief Executive of WorkCover in Victoria and worked for the Victorian Accident Compensation Commission since 1987.

After completing his Bachelor of Science at University of Melbourne, he had first worked as an industrial relations advisor in the mining and food production industries.

He migrated from Scotland to Australia with his family at age six.
