= Wheat Exports Australia =

Wheat Exports Australia (WEA) was an Australian government agency that regulated the export of bulk wheat through the bulk Wheat Export Accreditation Scheme ("the Scheme"). The Wheat Export Marketing Amendment Act 2012 was passed by parliament on 29 November 2012, abolishing Wheat Exports Australia.

The WEA was established on 1 July 2008 under the Wheat Export Marketing Act 2008 ("the Act"). It succeeded the Export Wheat Commission.
