= Terence Cole (jurist) =

Australian judge (born 1937)

The Honourable Terence Cole AO RFD KC

Royal Commissioner for the Inquiry into certain Australian companies in relation to the UN Oil-For-Food Programme
- In office 10 November 2005 – 27 November 2006
- Nominated by: John Howard (Prime Minister)
- Appointed by: Michael Jeffery (Governor-General)

Royal Commissioner for the Royal Commission into the Building and Construction Industry
- In office 29 August 2001 – 27 March 2003
- Nominated by: John Howard (Prime Minister)
- Appointed by: Peter Hollingworth (Governor-General)

Judge of the Supreme Court of New South Wales
- In office 1988 – 1998

Judge of the Court of Appeal of New South Wales
- In office 1994 – 1998

Deputy Judge Advocate General, Australian Defence Force
- In office 1994 – 1998

Commissioner of the Chief of the Australian Defence Force's Inquiry into the Loss of HMAS Sydney
- In office 2008 – 2009

Personal details
- Born: Terence Rhoderic Hudson Cole; 31 October 1937 (age 88) Longreach, Queensland
- Education: Fort Street High School; University of Sydney
- Occupation: Jurist
- Profession: Lawyer; barrister
- Awards
- Website: www.disputeresolution.net.au/Terence_Cole.htm

Military service
- Allegiance: Australia
- Branch/service: Royal Australian Naval Reserve
- Years of service: 1969 – 1998 (18–19 years)
- Rank: Commodore / Deputy Judge Advocate General

Terence Rhoderic Hudson Cole (born 31 October 1937), is an Australian jurist, known best for presiding over two Australian Government Royal Commissions.

== Background ==
Cole was born in Longreach, Queensland, and was educated at Fort Street High School in Sydney; where he was school Vice Captain. He graduated from the University of Sydney in 1961 with a BA LL.B.

== Legal career ==
Cole practiced as a solicitor before he was admitted to the bar in 1962 where he represented in commercial and common law matters and before the Land and Environment Court. He was appointed a Queen's Counsel in 1976.

Cole was appointed as a judge to the Supreme Court of New South Wales in 1988 in the Common Law Division; and then in the Commercial Division of the Court until 1994. He was promoted as a judge of the Court of Appeal of New South Wales in 1994 and served until 1998. Between 1998 and 2000 Cole became a Court appointed referee, arbitrator and mediator in various commercial disputes.

With an active military service in the Royal Australian Naval Reserve that commenced in 1969, rising to the rank of Commodore, Cole served as Deputy Judge Advocate General of the Australian Defence Force between 1992 and 1998.

He was commissioner of the 2000-2003 Cole Royal Commission into the Building and Construction Industry and the 2005-2006 Cole Inquiry investigating allegations that AWB Limited paid illegal bribes to the Iraqi regime of Saddam Hussein in order to secure wheat sales to Iraq.

On 31 March 2008, Cole was appointed by the Chief of the Australian Defence Force to head an inquiry into the loss of the cruiser HMAS Sydney in a mutually destructive battle during World War II.

== Honours ==
Cole was appointed an Officer of the Order of Australia in 2005 for services to the judiciary, particularly judicial administration, to reform of the building and construction industry, and to the community through the Australian Naval Reserve and conservation and arts organisations.

He received the Reserve Force Decoration in 1994 for fifteen years service to the Australian Naval Reserve.
