= Oil-for-Food Programme =

Programme headed by the United Nations

- Abbreviation: OIP, OFFP
- Formation: 1995
- Legal status: Dissolved in 2003
- Head: Benon Sevan
- Parent organization: United Nations Secretariat
- Website: www.un.org/Depts/oip

The Oil-for-Food Programme (OIP) was established by the United Nations in 1995 (under UN Security Council Resolution 986) to allow Iraq to sell oil on the world market in exchange for food, medicine, and other humanitarian needs for ordinary Iraqi citizens without allowing Iraq to boost its military capabilities.

The programme was introduced by United States President Bill Clinton's administration in 1995, as a response to arguments that ordinary Iraqi citizens were inordinately affected by the international economic sanctions aimed at the demilitarisation of Saddam Hussein's Iraq, imposed in the wake of the first Gulf War. The sanctions were discontinued on 21 November 2003 after the U.S. invasion of Iraq, and the humanitarian functions turned over to the Coalition Provisional Authority.

The programme was de facto terminated in 2003 and de jure terminated in 2010. Although the sanctions were effective, there were revelations of widespread corruption in the programme and abuse of its funds.

== Background and design ==
The Oil-for-Food Programme was instituted to relieve the extended suffering of civilians as the result of the United Nations' imposition of comprehensive sanctions on Iraq following Iraq's invasion of Kuwait in August 1990. Security Council Resolution 706 of 15 August 1991 was introduced to allow the sale of Iraqi oil in exchange for food.

Security Council Resolution 712 of 19 September 1991 confirmed that Iraq could sell up to US$1.6 billion in oil to fund an Oil-For-Food Programme. After an initial refusal, Iraq signed a memorandum of understanding (MOU) in May 1996 for arrangements to be taken to implement that resolution.

The Oil-for-Food Programme started in December 1996, and the first shipments of food arrived in March 1997. Sixty percent of Iraq's twenty-six million people were solely dependent on rations from the oil-for-food plan.

The programme used an escrow system. Oil exported from Iraq was paid for by the recipient into an escrow account possessed until 2001 by BNP Paribas bank, rather than to the Iraqi government. The money was then apportioned to pay for war reparations to Kuwait, ongoing coalition and United Nations operations within Iraq. The remainder, the majority of the revenue, was available to the Iraqi government to purchase regulated items.

The Iraqi government was permitted to purchase only items that were not embargoed under the economic sanctions. Certain items, such as raw foodstuffs, were expedited for immediate shipment, but for many items, including pencils and folic acid, the process typically took six months. Items deemed to have potential application in chemical, biological or nuclear weapons development were banned regardless of their stated purpose.

== Financial statistics ==
Over US$54 billion worth of Iraqi oil was sold on the world market. About US$46 billion of these funds intended to provide humanitarian aid to the Iraqi people. This included food and medicine, given the context of international economic sanctions. A considerable portion was spent on Gulf War reparations paid through a compensation fund (25% starting December 2000). UN administrative and operational costs for the programme was US$1.2 billion; the cost of the weapons inspection programme was also paid from these funds. Internal audits have not been made public.

== End of the programme ==
The bad news, therefore, is that the UN proved unequal to the task of preventing a rogue regime from stealing some of its own money. The good news is that this same UN machinery proved equal to the task of preventing that same regime from fielding WMD, developing nuclear weapons and reconstituting a military threat to its neighbours. Most observers would conclude that the UN, however inadequate its financial oversight, certainly got its priorities right.

The UN sanctions regime against Iraq, including the Oil for Food program, is worth close scrutiny not because it was a scandal, although scandal there was, but because taken as a whole, it is the most successful use of international sanctions on record. Documenting the why and wherefores of that success is as important as correcting the shortfalls that allowed a rogue regime, in connivance with unscrupulous international businessmen, to siphon funds from UN-administered Iraqi accounts.

— Testimony on A Comparative Evaluation of United Nations Peacekeeping by James Dobbins presented before the US House Committee on Foreign Affairs in 2007

Shortly before US-led Coalition forces launched an invasion of Iraq, UN Secretary-General Kofi Annan suspended the programme and evacuated more than 300 workers monitoring the distribution of supplies.

On 28 March 2003, Annan, the United States, and Britain asked the UN Security Council to ensure that nearly US$10 billion in goods Iraq had ordered and that were already approved—including US$2.4 billion for food—could enter the country once conditions allowed. The resolution under discussion made clear that the chief responsibility for addressing humanitarian consequences of the war would fall to the United States and Britain if they took control of the country. Under the 1949 Fourth Geneva Convention these are the responsibilities of the occupying power.

On 22 May 2003, UN Security Council Resolution 1483 granted authority to the Coalition Provisional Authority to use Iraq's oil revenue. The programme's remaining funds, $10 billion, were transferred over a six-month winding-up period to the Development Fund for Iraq under the Coalition Provisional Authority's control; this represented 14% of the programme's total income over 5 years.

The programme was formally terminated on 21 November 2003 and its major functions were turned over to the Coalition Provisional Authority.

== Corruption ==
The programme also suffered from widespread corruption and abuse. Throughout its existence, the programme was dogged by accusations that some of its profits were unlawfully diverted to the government of Iraq and to UN officials. These accusations were made in many countries, including the US and Norway.

Until 2001, the money for the Oil-for-Food Programme went through BNP Paribas, whose main private share-holder is Iraqi-born Nadhmi Auchi, a man whose estimated worth is about $1 billion according to Forbes estimates, the 13th-richest man in Britain according to The Guardian. Auchi received a 15-month suspended sentence for his involvement in the Elf scandal, which the British newspaper called "the biggest fraud inquiry in Europe since the Second World War", saying "Elf became a private bank for its executives who spent £200 million on political favours, mistresses, jewellery, fine art, villas and apartments". Elf, an oil company, merged with TotalFina to become Total in 2003.

=== Misapplication of funding ===
According to information from Aqila al-Hashimi, who was senior bureaucrat with the Oil-for-Food Programme in Iraq, of the programme's total of $60 billion, "roughly 65% was actually applied to aid". Over 193 so-called electrical consultants each received $15,000 per month while the electricity only worked a few hours at a time.

Benon Sevan of Cyprus, who headed the programme, defended it, claiming that it had only a 2.2% administrative cost and that it was subject to more than 100 internal and external audits. He blamed Security Council restrictions for making the situation difficult and said that 90 percent of Iraq's population relied on the programme for its monthly food basket. Sevan stonewalled efforts to review and investigate the programme. He ordered his staff to enforce a policy that complaints about illegal payoffs should be formally filed with the whistleblower's country, making them public and allowing Iraq to bar any whistleblowers. In 2000, Dileep Nair, the UN corruption watchdog, wanted to determine the programme's level of vulnerability. Sevan and UN Deputy Secretary-General Louise Frechette rejected any such investigation, claiming that it would be too expensive to be worthwhile. UN Chef de Cabinet Iqbal Riza ordered the shredding of years' worth of documents in his office concerning the programme. He said that they were from a working file that contained copies of documents received by his office, and were purged due to lack of space, and also that the originals were held elsewhere.

In response to these criticisms, and to evidence acquired after the 2003 invasion of Iraq, accusations were made that skimmed profits were being used to buy influence at the UN and with Kofi Annan himself. An investigation cleared Annan of any personal wrongdoing.

=== Adulterated foods ===
According to an interim report released on 3 February 2005 by former Federal Reserve chairman Paul Volcker's commission (see Investigations below), much of the food aid supplied under the programme "was unfit for human consumption". The report concluded that Sevan had accepted nearly $150,000 in bribes over the course of the programme, and in 2005 he was suspended from his position at the United Nations as a result of the fraud investigation.

=== Al Mada list ===
One of the earliest allegations of wrongdoing in the programme surfaced on 25 January 2004, when al Mada, a daily newspaper in Iraq, published a list of individuals and organizations alleged to have received oil sales contracts via the UN's Oil-for-Food Programme. The list came from over 15,000 documents which were reportedly found in the state-owned Iraqi oil corporation, the Iraq National Oil Company, which had close links to the Iraqi Oil Ministry.

Named in the list of beneficiaries were George Galloway, then a British Member of Parliament (MP), and his charity, the Mariam Appeal; former French Interior Minister Charles Pasqua; Shaker al-Kaffaji, an Iraqi-American businessman; Indian Foreign Minister Natwar Singh, and Bheem Singh. Many prominent Russian firms and individuals were also included on the al Mada list. Even the Russian Orthodox Church was supposedly involved in illegal oil trading. The former assistant to the Vatican secretary of state, Reverend Jean-Marie Benjamin, is said to have received the rights to sell 4.5 million barrels (720,000 m^{3}). George Galloway subsequently won two libel actions against the Christian Science Monitor and Daily Telegraph, which had reported the allegations.

The president of Oilexco Ltd, Arthur Millholland, whose name also appeared on the al Mada list, denied wrongdoing but confirmed that illegal surcharges were being paid to the Iraqi government by contractors. Few deny that in Iraq, like in many third-world countries, bribes and kickbacks were regularly paid to the leadership in order to get contracts; however, the al Mada list does not discuss bribes paid to Iraq – it discusses bribes paid to individuals to support Iraq.

=== Operation of the scheme ===
The scheme is alleged to have worked in this way: individuals and organizations sympathetic to the Iraqi regime, or those just easily bribed, were offered oil contracts through the Oil-for-Food Programme. These contracts for Iraqi oil could then be sold on the open world market and the seller was allowed to keep a transaction fee, said to be between $0.15 and $0.50/barrel (0.94 and 3.14 $/m^{3}) of oil sold. The seller was then to refund the Iraqi government a certain percentage of the commission.

Contracts to sell Iraq humanitarian goods through the Oil-for-Food Programme were given to companies and individuals based on their willingness to kick back a certain percentage of the contract profits to the Iraqi regime. Companies that sold commodities via the Oil-for-Food Programme were overcharging by up to 10%, with part of the overcharged amount being diverted into private bank accounts for Saddam Hussein and other regime officials and the other part being kept by the supplier.

The involvement of the UN itself in the scandal began in February 2004 after the name of Benon Sevan, executive director of the Oil-for-Food Programme, appeared on the Iraqi Oil Ministry's documents. Sevan received vouchers for at least 11,000,000 barrels (1,700,000 m^{3}) of oil, worth some $3.5 million in profit. Sevan denied the charges.

=== BNP Paribas ===
The sole bank handling funds transfers for the Oil-for-Food Programme was the New York branch of the Banque Nationale de Paris-Paribas, or BNP Paribas. This French bank was the sole bank administering the $64 billion UN programme. An investigation by the US House Committee on International Relations found that BNP Paribas made payments for goods without proof of delivery and allowed payments to third parties not identified as authorized recipients. Investigators estimate that the bank received more than $700 million in fees under the UN programme, which began in 1996 and ended after the ouster of Saddam in March 2003.

=== Duelfer Report ===
The Iraq Survey Group, which was tasked with finding evidence of weapons of mass destruction in Iraq, found that OFF saved the Iraqi economy from decline after the imposition of sanctions. Furthermore, the Iraqi regime found that it could corrupt OFF to get hard currency that could be used to manipulate the Iraq Sanctions Committee and undermine sanctions as well as to obtain more weapons.

The final official version of the Iraq Survey Group report, known as the Duelfer Report, cited only France, Russia and China (countries who were also strongly anti-war) as violators who paid kickbacks. According to the report, the top three recipients of oil included Russia (30%), France (15%), and China (10%), which are all members of the UN Security Council. The US received 2–3% of the oil. US recipients included ExxonMobil, ChevronTexaco Corp. and the El Paso Corp. The list of US companies was originally censored by CIA lawyers, citing privacy issues, but was later leaked.

Nationality of recipients	Oil received (% of total volume)
Russia	30
France	15
China	10
Switzerland	6
Malaysia	5
Syria	6
Jordan	4
Egypt	4
Other (inc. US)	20

On 5 June 2007, the German chapter of the anti-corruption organisation Transparency International (TI) lodged a complaint with the German Federal Ministry for Economic Affairs and Energy (BMWi) against 57 German companies for allegedly paying $11.9m in kickbacks in the United Nations' Oil for Food Programme in Iraq.

=== Oil coupons as bribes ===
The US-funded satellite network Al Hurra broadcast a story on 6 January 2005 detailing allegations that Saddam's regime had bribed news reporters with oil coupons. Reporters named include Ahmed Mansour of Al Jazeera and Hamida Na'na, a writer based in France known for her pro-Saddam positions. Two types of oil coupons were used: silver coupons that entitled holders to nine million barrels of oil, and gold coupons worth more. Hamida Naanaa is said to have received a gold coupon.

=== Ingersoll-Rand pays $2.5m in fines for kickbacks ===
In October 2007, the SEC brought a case against Ingersoll-Rand alleging kickbacks by three different subsidiaries to Iraqi Government officials. Ingersoll-Rand's German subsidiary ABG, subsidiary I-R Italiana and the Irish subsidiary Thermo King paid "after-sales service fees" (ASSFs), although no bona fide services were performed. Ingersoll-Rand, without admitting or denying the allegations in the commission's complaint, consented to the entry of a final judgment permanently enjoining it from future violations of Sections 13(b)(2)(A) and 13(b)(2)(B) of the Securities Exchange Act of 1934, ordering it to disgorge $1,710,034 in profits, plus $560,953 in pre-judgment interest, and to pay a civil penalty of $1,950,000. Ingersoll-Rand was also ordered to comply with certain undertakings regarding its compliance program for the Foreign Corrupt Practices Act, and to pay a $2,500,000 fine pursuant to a deferred prosecution agreement with the U.S. Department of Justice, Fraud Section.

=== Complaints by Kurds ===
The Iraqi Kurds complained since the programme began that they were not being paid their fair share of the oil revenues. According to the guidelines set up by the Oil-for-Food Programme, the revenues were to be divided up in such a way as to protect Iraq's predominantly Kurdish regions. The allegations include claims that the Cairo office of the UN's World Health Organization, run by an individual alleged to have received oil sales contracts, managed to stall the building of a new general hospital for the Kurdish city of Sulaymaniya, even though the funds for the project had been available since 1998.

=== Potential Annan link ===
On 14 June 2005, two 1998 memos surfaced that appeared to link Kofi Annan to Cotecna Inspection S.A. The first one described a meeting between Annan and Cotecna while the company was bidding on the programme, after which the company raised its bid. A second one mentioned that Cotecna was confident that they would get the bid due to "effective but quiet lobbying" in New York diplomatic circles. The source of the documents was a Cotecna executive.

The Second Interim Report by the IIC confirmed that Cotecna won the Oil for Food contract fairly and based on merit. The Committee concluded that there was no link between Kofi Annan and the award of Cotecna's contract, and Cotecna has been transparent and cooperative through this investigation.

=== Alleged involvement of Russian intelligence ===
According to high-ranking Russian SVR defector Sergei Tretyakov, the Oil-for-Food Programme was sabotaged by an undercover Russian intelligence officer, Alexander Kramar, a UN employee who set up the artificially low oil prices in 1998 to allow Saddam to use the oil vouchers as lucrative bribes. The difference between the market price and the price defined by Kramar was pocketed by people who received the vouchers from Saddam. Among the bribed were top officials from Russia, France, and China. The biggest part of vouchers (to buy 1,366 billion barrels (2.172×10^{11} m^{3}) of oil) went to forty-six individuals or organizations in Russia, including the Russian Orthodox Church. They pocketed $476 million. Among Russians who received the money were Alexander Voloshin and Vladimir Zhirinovsky. Sergei Isakov, a friend of Voloshin, carried "bags with money" from Moscow to Baghdad taking the "earned" money as kickbacks to Saddam.

=== Alleged use for financing of Saddam Hussein regime ===
Former United Nations procurement officer Alexander Yakovlev, a Russian official in the UN Procurement Department, pleaded guilty to accepting nearly $1 million in bribes from contractors involved in the U.N.'s Oil-for-Food programme in Iraq. His prosecution followed the decision by U.N. Secretary-General Kofi Annan to waive Yakovlev's diplomatic immunity. He later resigned and pleaded guilty to corruption charges. The program was also linked to Ahmed Idris Nasreddin, who was designated as a financier of terrorism by the United Kingdom and the United States, and identified by the United Nations as being associated with or a member of Al Qaeda. Nasreddin was removed from these lists in 2007 after he demonstrated that he had severed all business ties with Youssef Nada, who co-founded the Al Taqwa Bank with him, and pledged to have no further dealings with either Nada or the bank. Petra Navigation Group was a company that was on the blacklist of firms blocked from doing business with the U.S. for sanctions-busting activities designed to help Saddam's regime. According to some sources, Saddam provided millions of dollars from the Oil-for-Food program to Iraqi Officials and the Ba'ath Party.

=== Oil for wheat ===
A report by UN investigator Paul Volcker released in October 2005 found that the Australian Wheat Board was the biggest single source of kickbacks for the Iraqi government. In exchange for trouble-free disembarkation of wheat purchased under the Oil-for-Food Programme, the Australian Wheat Board paid 'trucking charges' totalling A$300 million to Alia. Alia is a real Jordanian trucking company, but one with no role in the distribution of Australian wheat in Iraq. Alia kept a small percentage of 'charges', and passed the remainder on to Saddam's government. The AWB was fully compensated for the charges by increases in the price paid; the payments were approved by the Department of Foreign Affairs & Trade. The Australian Government commissioned judge Terence Cole to further investigate whether Australian companies had indeed paid kickbacks to the Saddam regime. The Cole Inquiry commenced in December 2005.

The Cole Inquiry has received testimony from senior Australian Government officials, including Prime Minister John Howard, Deputy Prime Minister Mark Vaile, Foreign Minister Alexander Downer and various officials from the Department of Foreign Affairs and Trade. During the course of the inquiry numerous AWB officials have resigned, including managing director Andrew Lindberg. In 2009, the Australian Federal Police ended the investigation related to the scandal.

== Investigations ==
=== GAO investigation ===
After the 2003 invasion of Iraq and subsequent Coalition victory over the Iraqi Army, the US Government Accountability Office (GAO) was given the task of finalizing all Oil-for-Food-related supply contracts made with the now-defunct regime and of tracking down the personal fortunes of former regime members. During the execution of this task, the GAO found weaknesses in the programme that allowed kickbacks and other sources of wealth for Saddam Hussein. The GAO estimates that the Saddam Hussein regime generated $10.1 billion in illegal revenues. This figure includes $5.7 billion from oil smuggling and $4.4 billion in illicit surcharges on oil sales and after-sales charges on suppliers. The scale of the fraud was far more extensive than the GAO had previously estimated. A U.S. Department of Defense study, cited by the GAO, evaluated 759 contracts administered through the Oil-for-Food Programme and found that nearly half had been overpriced, by an average of 21 percent. Unlike the 661 committee, members of the Security Council had the authority to launch investigations into contracts and to stop any contract they did not like. The British and the Americans had turned down hundreds of Oil-for-Food contract requests, but these were blocked primarily on the grounds that the items being imported were dual-use technologies.

To quote the GAO report, in its summary:

Both the UN Secretary-General, through the Office of the Iraqi Programme (OIP) and the Security Council, through its sanctions committee for Iraq, were responsible for overseeing the Oil-for-Food Programme. However, the Iraqi government negotiated contracts directly with purchasers of Iraqi oil and suppliers of commodities, which may have been one important factor that allowed Iraq to levy illegal surcharges and commissions.

Joseph A. Christoff, director of international affairs and trade at the General Accounting Office, told a House hearing that UN auditors had refused to release the internal audits of the Oil-for-Food Programme. Benon Sevan, with support from Kofi Annan, had written letters to all former Oil-for-Food contractors asking them to consult Sevan before releasing any documents to GAO or US congressional inquiry panels. Throughout its history, the programme had received both complaints from critics saying that it needed to be more open and complaints from companies about proprietary information being disclosed.

The United Nations has denied all requests by the GAO for access to confidential internal audits of the Oil-for-Food Programme.

While attempting to determine the complexity of the Oil-for-Food Programme for articles in The Wall Street Journal, investigative journalist Claudia Rosett of the Foundation for the Defence of Democracies and the Hudson Institute discovered that the UN treated details such as the identities of Oil-for-Food contractors; the price, quantity and quality of goods involved in the relief deals; and the identities of the oil buyers and the precise quantities that they received as confidential. The bank statements, the interest paid, and the transactions were all secret as well. Rosett has come under harsh criticism from Denis Halliday and Benon Sevan, who have claimed that many of Rosett's claims (such as Oil-for-Food funding the approval of an Olympic stadium, and where responsibility for various issues lay according to the UN resolutions) were incorrect.

The US House Committee on International Relations investigated the Oil-for-Food Programme and discovered that money was provided by Sabah Yassen, the former Iraqi ambassador to Jordan, to pay the families of Palestinian suicide bombers between $15,000 to $25,000. From September 2000 until the invasion of Iraq, the families of Palestinians killed or wounded in the conflict with Israel (including 117 responsible for suicide bombings in Israel) received over $35 million. It is alleged that this money came from the UN Oil-for-Food Programme.

=== Independent Inquiry Committee ===
After initial opposition to an investigation, UN Secretary-General Kofi Annan stated on 19 March 2004 that a full independent investigation would be launched. In an official press interview, Annan said "[...] it is highly possible that there has been quite a lot of wrongdoing, but we need to investigate [...] and see who was responsible." "00:00:03". (audio clip, @5:56) However, Annan was emphatic that most of the claims were "outrageous and exaggerated", and that most of the criticisms had to do with things over which the programme had no authority.

The following individuals were chosen in April 2004 to head the United Nations' Independent Inquiry Committee:

- Paul Volcker, former United States Federal Reserve System chairman and director of the United Nations Association of the United States of America;
- Mark Pieth of Switzerland, an expert on money-laundering in the Organisation for Economic Co-operation and Development (OECD); and
- Richard Goldstone of South Africa, former Prosecutor of the International Criminal Tribunal for the former Yugoslavia (ICTY) and the International Criminal Tribunal for Rwanda (ICTR).

On 22 April 2004, the United Nations Security Council passed a unanimous resolution endorsing the Volcker inquiry into corruption in the United Nations Oil-for-Food Programme for Iraq, calling upon all 191 member states to cooperate.

The definitive report was presented by Paul Volcker to the Security Council on 7 September 2005.

A leaked internal UN audit, which surfaced on mineweb.com, shows massive discrepancies between Cotecna reports and UN agency reports for the value of the shipments into northern Iraq. The audit found that Cotecna did no "value" inspections on nearly US$1 billion worth of aid shipments for the Inter-Agency Humanitarian Programme into northern Iraq. However, in a subsequent report published by the Independent Inquiry Committee (IIC) (27 October 2005) it was concluded that "there were no major complaints by the United Nations or its member states about Cotecna's performance" and that "the audit did not report any deficiencies in Cotecna's inspections". Benon Sevan was briefed in December 2002 on the findings of the audit.

The audit is available here. Its summary states:

OIOS' overall conclusion is that the management of the Contract has not been adequate and certain provisions of the Contract had not been adhered to. In addition, the incorporation of additional costs, such as rehabilitation of camps in the man-day-rate was an unacceptable arrangement. Also, the contract had been amended prior to its commencement, which was inappropriate. OIP needs to strengthen its management of contracts and the Procurement Division (PD) should ensure that the basis of payment is appropriate in order to avoid additional costs to the Organization

After reading the leaked audit, congressman Henry Hyde wrote to Kofi Annan wondering why "The U.S. Congress – which provides 22 percent of the U.N.'s budget and which has publicly requested copies of the 55 internal audits – should be required to depend on media leaks for source documents."

==== Interim report results ====
In a 219-page initial report, the Volcker Commission documented how OIF chairman Benon Sevan used his position to solicit and receive allocations of oil from Iraq during the years he oversaw the humanitarian relief programme. Internal records from SOMO (Iraq's State Oil Marketing Organization), as well as interviews with former Iraqi officials involved in illicit oil deals, show that Sevan had requested and received allocations of 7.3 million barrels (1,160,000 m^{3}) of oil on behalf of a Panama-registered trading company called African Middle East Petroleum Co.

Although the report makes no specific allegations of criminal activity by Sevan, Volcker does not rule out the possibility that charges might be filed by authorities in countries with relevant jurisdiction. The report called Sevan's conduct "ethically improper", noting that Sevan had received large cash payments totalling $160,000 each year he had headed the programme. Sevan claims the money came from an aunt in Cyprus who has since died, but the panel found no evidence to back this claim.

Volcker also reported in January that a review of 58 confidential UN internal OIF audits showed UN officials ignored early signs that humanitarian goods shipped to Iraq before the 2003 Invasion war were given little if any inspections by the Swiss company Cotecna. However, Volker concluded on 27 October 2005 IIC report that "the audit did not report any deficiencies in Cotecna's inspections". Cotecna paid Kojo Annan, Kofi Annan's son, consulting fees until November 2003. Volcker said that future reports would deal with questions regarding Kojo Annan.

=== Investigations by Iraqi Governing Council ===
International accounting firm KPMG had been selected by the Iraqi Governing Council to investigate the al Mada claims, along with Freshfields Bruckhaus Deringer. It was due to release its findings to the Iraqi Governing Council in May 2004. However, in June 2004, KPMG stopped working on the project because it was owed money by the IGC.

The US has been harshly critical of the KPMG probe led by associates of Ahmed Chalabi, accusing it of undermining the main probe established by Paul Bremer. That probe had been run by the head of Iraq's independent Board of Supreme Audit, Ehsan Karim, with assistance from Ernst & Young. The Board of Supreme Audit is within the Iraqi Finance Ministry. In June 2004, Karim's investigation agreed to share information with the Volcker panel. However, on 1 July 2004, Karim was killed by a bomb magnetically attached to his car.

Claude Hankes-Drielsma, a British national and long-time friend of Ahmed Chalabi, was appointed by the IGC to coordinate its investigation of the Oil-for-Food Programme. Drielsma testified in front of the US Congress (on 21 April 2004) that the KPMG investigation "is expected to demonstrate the clear link between those countries which were quite ready to support Saddam Hussein's regime for their own financial benefit, at the expense of the Iraqi people, and those that opposed the strict application of sanctions and the overthrow of Saddam". He also testified that Chalabi was in charge of the investigation for the IGC.

In late May 2004, on the same day that Chalabi's offices at the Iraqi National Congress were raided by coalition forces, Drielsma claimed that an individual or individuals hacked into his computer and deleted every file associated with his investigation. He also claimed that "a back-up databank" was also deleted. When asked by Claudia Rosett if he had been physically threatened as well, Drielsma replied with "no comment". Drielsma has also been an outspoken critic of the UN's refusal to release any internal Oil-for-Food audit information to the IGC.

=== Criminal investigation in France ===
The French criminal justice system is investigating the alleged involvement of two former officials from the French Ministry of Foreign Affairs, Jean-Bernard Mérimée and Serge Boidevaix. The two are accused of having used their extensive network of connections in the Arab world in order to commit "influence peddling" and "corruption of foreign public agents". They have been put under formal criminal investigation by investigating magistrate Philippe Courroye, a famous specialist in cases of corruption and other financial dealings. Both men had retired at the time of the alleged crimes and acted in their personal capacity, not as official envoys of the French government; however, Boidevaix claims that he kept the Ministry of Foreign Affairs informed of his actions in Iraq. The Ministry claims to have warned both men formally in 2001 (during the administration of Lionel Jospin).

Some other people, including Bernard Guillet, an aide to French senator Charles Pasqua, are also under formal investigation. Guillet and Pasqua deny any wrongdoing.

=== US Senate investigations ===
US Senator Norm Coleman called for Kofi Annan to resign over the scandal and held a number of hearings on the matter. The most spectacular of these hearings occurred after the subcommittee released a report that accused (then) British Member of Parliament (MP) George Galloway, Russian politician Vladimir Zhirinovsky, and former French Interior Minister Charles Pasqua of receiving oil allocations from Iraq in return for being political allies of Saddam Hussein's regime. Galloway, in an unusual appearance of a British MP before a US Senate subcommittee, responded angrily to the allegations against him in a confrontational public hearing which drew much media attention in both America and Britain. Galloway denied the allegations.

It is estimated that as much as $10 billion to $21.3 billion went unaccounted for and/or was directed to Saddam Hussein and his government in the form of kickbacks and oil smuggling. Record keeping of illegal behaviour is hard to come by and rare at best. To date, only 1 of 54 internal UN audits of the Oil-for-Food Programme has been made public. The UN has refused all requests for its audits.

Warren Hoge alleged that the American government was aware of the scandal and chose to not prevent the smuggling because their allies Turkey and Jordan benefited from the majority of the smuggled oil. US Senator Carl Levin (D-Michigan) is quoted in an interview for the New York Times as saying, "There is no question that the bulk of the illicit oil revenues came from the open sale of Iraqi oil to Jordan and to Turkey, and that that was a way of going around the Oil-for-Food Programme [and that] we were fully aware of the bypass and looked the other way."

=== Indictments ===
On 6 January 2006, South Korean businessman Tongsun Park was arrested by the FBI in Houston after he was indicted for illegally accepting millions of dollars from Iraq in the UN Oil-for-Food Programme. The criminal charges against him were unsealed in a U.S. District Court in Manhattan.

After an investigation by the Federal Bureau of Investigation's New York Field Office, on 16 January 2007, Benon Sevan was indicted by prosecutors from the Southern District of New York for taking about $160,000 in bribes. Michael J. Garcia, the U.S. Attorney for the Southern District of New York, issued a warrant through Interpol for the arrest of Sevan at his home in Cyprus, as well as a warrant for Efraim "Fred" Nadler, a New York businessman who was indicted on charges of channelling the illegal payments to Sevan. Nadler's whereabouts are unknown.

=== Daimler AG Kickbacks Case ===
On 1 April 2010, Daimler AG pleaded guilty to bribery charges brought by the U.S. Department of Justice and the U.S. Securities and Exchange Commission and will pay US$185 million as settlement, but remains subject to a two-year deferred prosecution agreement and oversight by an independent monitor. The German automaker of Mercedes-Benz vehicles was accused of violating the terms of the United Nations' Oil for Food Program with Iraq by including kickbacks 10 percent of the contract values to the Iraqi government. The SEC said the company earned more than $4 million from the sale of vehicles and spare parts.

The SEC case was sparked in 2004 after David Bazzetta, a former auditor at then DaimlerChrysler Corp, filed a whistle-blower complaint after he was fired for raising questions about bank accounts controlled by Mercedes-Benz units in South America. Bazzetta alleged that he learned in a July 2001 corporate audit executive committee meeting in Stuttgart that business units "continued to maintain secret bank accounts to bribe foreign government officials", though the company knew the practice violated U.S. laws.

The investigation for the case also revealed that Daimler made some $56 million in bribes related to more than 200 transactions in 22 countries that earned the company $1.9 billion in revenue and at least $91.4 million in illegal profits. "Using offshore bank accounts, third-party agents and deceptive pricing practices, these companies [Daimler AG and its subsidiaries] saw foreign bribery as a way of doing business", said Mythili Raman, a principal deputy in the Justice Department's criminal division.

"It is no exaggeration to describe corruption and bribe-paying at Daimler as a standard business practice", Robert Khuzami, director of the SEC's enforcement division, said in a statement.

Judge Richard J. Leon of United States District Court in Washington, approved the plea agreement and settlement, calling it a "just resolution".

== See also ==
- Iraq sanctions
- Economy of Iraq
- Management of Iraq Reconstruction Programme
- Oil-for-Food Program Hearings
- Fuel vs food
- Oil price
