= AWB Limited =

Former Australian Wheat Board

- Formerly: Australian Wheat Board
- Traded as: ASX: AWB
- Industry: Grain
- Founded: 1939
- Founder: Government of Australia
- Defunct: 2010
- Headquarters: Melbourne, Australia
- Products: Wheat, barley, canola, sorghum
- Revenue: $5.5 billion (2010)
- Operating income: $407 million (2010)
- Net income: $13 million (2010)
- Number of employees: 2,200
- Website: www.awb.com.au

AWB Limited was a major grain marketing organisation based in Australia. Founded in 1939 by the Government of Australia as the Australian Wheat Board, in 1999 it became a private company, owned by wheat growers. It was acquired by Agrium in 2010.

== History ==
The AWB was founded in 1939 to regulate the wheat market after the excesses of the Great Depression. The single desk dates to this period. This type of arrangement was not unique to Australia, as the Canadian Wheat Board was created in 1935 in a similar fashion (but its history dates back to an earlier wheat marketing board created during World War I, and also includes the experience of cooperative wheat pools during the 1920s).

For much of its early history, it was a government-run and owned company. In July 1999, it was restructured as a private company. It offered "class A" shares to those who met its definition of growers and who had the ability to elect the majority of its board and chairperson, and from August 2001, 'class B' were publicly traded on the Australian Securities Exchange. In 2008, constitutional amendments were passed. Despite resistance from several wheat lobbies and industry groups, it consolidated ownership of AWB into one type of share, giving growers no special consideration. This change was proposed by the AWB management as necessarily to having a simpler, lower-risk business model.

After privatisation, AWB grew to incorporate a number of subsidiaries to diversify its income away from its wheat exports. Its subsidiary businesses include GrainFlow to manage collection of grain from farmers to ports, companies to ship the grain overseas to customers, and Landmark rural services.

== Corporate structure ==
AWB Limited was a holding company owning a number of subsidiaries. Its shares were freely traded on the Australian Securities Exchange.

AWB Limited had a number of subsidiaries. Some of these subsidiaries existed due to legislative requirements relating to the operation of the single desk; others exist for the purpose of controlling credit risk. As of early 2006, they were:

- AWB Limited - the holding company
- AWB (International) Limited - the corporation authorised by federal legislation to export wheat under the monopsony
- AWB (Australia) Limited - domestic wheat trading and export of non-wheat grains
- AWB Services Limited - provides services (e.g. financial services, IT services, asset management) to the rest of the AWB group
- AWB Harvest Finance Limited, AWB Commercial Funding Limited, and AWB Riskassist Limited - provide finance and financial risk management for wheat export transactions
- AWB GrainFlow Pty Ltd - provides bulk grain handling and transport facilities
- Landmark (comprised Landmark Operations Limited and Landmark (Qld) Limited) provides finance, insurance, real estate, commodities trading, farming equipment sales, etc. to Australian farmers (including other agricultural sectors such as wool and livestock)

AWB announced a new strategy in 2009 to simplify and de-risk the business. This resulted in the divestment of the financial services loan book to the ANZ Bank in December 2009.

In March 2010, AWB announced the signing of a memorandum of understanding to sell the Geneva business and to joint venture the local grain trading business.

== Oil for food scandal ==
Previously a low profile organisation, the AWB made headlines in late 2005 when it was alleged that it had knowingly paid kickbacks to the Iraq Government, in violation of United Nations sanctions and Australian law. Following the Iraqi invasion of Kuwait in 1990, the United Nations had imposed a financial and trade embargo on Iraq. However, after facing criticism over the humanitarian impacts of the sanctions, the UN from 1995 until late 2003 allowed Iraq to trade oil on the world market in exchange for food, medicine and other humanitarian needs.

Despite this, at the insistence of the Iraq government of dictator Saddam Hussein, the AWB agreed to pay "transportation fees" of around $A$290 million. This money was paid to a Jordanian transportation company, Alia. Alia kept a small percentage of the fees, and paid the remainder onto Saddam's government. This breached the sanctions placed on the Iraqi regime.

The government-sanctioned Cole Inquiry into the company's role in the scandal has been completed and was tabled by Attorney-General Philip Ruddock on 27 November 2006. The report found that, from mid-1999, AWB had knowingly entered into an arrangement that involved paying kickbacks to the Iraqi government, in order to retain its business. The Inquiry recommended that 12 people be investigated for possible criminal and corporations offences over the scandal.

At the height of the investigation, the single-desk arrangement from which AWB benefits came under criticism. In 2006, the Australian Grain Exporters Association asked the Government to remove AWB's monopoly export powers. The oil-for-wheat scandal cast doubt among some grain exporters over the trust placed in the company, especially as they lost the ability to export to Iraq during the length of the Cole Inquiry, losing one of their biggest markets.

The scandal resulted in international condemnation and litigation. On 11 July 2006, North American farmers claimed $1 billion in damages from AWB at Washington, D.C., alleging the Australian wheat exporter used bribery and other corrupt activities to corner grain markets. The growers claimed that AWB used the same techniques to secure grain sales in other markets in Asia and other countries in the Middle East. The lawsuit was dismissed in March 2007.

In August 2009, the Australian Federal Police dropped their investigation into any criminal actions undertaken by AWB and others in this matter. This decision came after Paul Hastings QC declared the prospect of convictions was limited and "not in the public interest". The Australian Securities & Investments Commission then proceeded with several civil cases against six former directors and officers of AWB. AWB's former managing director Andrew Lindberg and former chief financial officer Paul Ingleby were ultimately fined and banned from managing a company for one year. Former chairman Trevor Flugge was also fined, and banned from managing a company for five years. A civil suit brought by shareholders of AWB was settled out of court for $39.5 million in February 2010.

Australia's government has distanced itself from the payments to Saddam Hussein's regime, given Australia's contribution to military action against Hussein in the 2003 invasion of Iraq. Andrew Lindberg resigned as managing director on 9 February 2006 and from the board of directors on 22 February 2006 under intense public and media pressure.

== Business performance post Cole Inquiry ==
In the years immediately following the Cole Inquiry, AWB continued to be dogged by bad performance.

Following the publication of the Cole Inquiry, a new management team was installed under the leadership of Gordon Davis who was recruited from Orica in August 2006. Davis successfully reformed the constitution and the shareholder structure to consolidate into 1 class of shareholder.

This new management team has not been entirely without controversy. On 26 April 2007, Yahoo News reported that AWB also breached US sanctions on Iran. These sanctions prohibit American citizens and companies using American currency from trading with Iran. In 2006, AWB's US subsidiary attempted to pay an Iranian transport company approximately $1 million, in clear breach of the US sanctions.

In 2009, the company faced difficulties in another new market, when it was forced to recapitalise the balance sheet after the company produced significant losses from the expansion of trading activities into Brazil under Davis.

Despite making a small profit in 2009, in March 2010, the company announced a profit downgrade from domestic trading activities. In May 2010, it reported a half-year loss of $64.8 million, which it claimed due to the cost of settling the shareholder class action for $39.5m, and a loss of $65.4m on restructuring costs associated with its sale of the Landmark Financial Services loan and deposit books.

== Sale ==
In July 2010, AWB entered into an agreement to merge with GrainCorp. This did not proceed, after Agrium made a successful takeover offer that was completed in December 2010, with the company delisted from the Australian Securities Exchange. In 2011, Cargill acquired the AWB Commodity Management business from Agrium.
