= Combet =

Combet may refer to:

- Combet v Commonwealth, Australian court case decided in 2005
- Greg Combet (born 1958), Australian politician
- Louis Combet (1927–2004), French scholar of Spanish language
