= Jammes =

Jammes is a surname. Notable people with the surname include:

- André Jammes (1927–2026), French bookseller and photography historian
- Francis Jammes (1868–1938), French poet
- Jean-Vital Jammes (1825–1893), French opera singer
- Robert Jammes (1927–2020), French linguist

== See also ==
- Saint-Jammes, a commune of Pyrénées-Atlantiques, France
- James (disambiguation)
