= Master contract (labor) =

A master contract or master agreement is a collective bargaining agreement which covers all unionized worksites in an industry, market or company, and which establishes the terms and conditions of employment common to all workers in the industry, market or company.

== About master contracts ==
A master contract may be geographically limited and occur at the local, regional or national level. It may also be limited to a specific market, whether local, regional or national. Although a master contract governs the general terms of employment that apply uniformly across the company or industry, master contracts often provide for local terms to be negotiated. Some master contracts may also permit local or regional variations in order to meet special economic, competitive, or other circumstances for a union or company. For example, in the early 1980s the United Auto Workers exempted Chrysler from the master contract governing the U.S. auto industry because the company was in deep financial trouble.

Master contracts are common in the automobile manufacturing, shipping, package express, mining (especially coal mining), and general manufacturing industries. For example, the UAW and the "Big Three" American automakers tend to operate in this pattern: the union selects one manufacturer with which it does most of its negotiation; when an agreement is reached, the union attempts to apply the same contract to the others. Other areas where master agreements can be found include tire manufacturing, public education, baking, custodial and housekeeping services, and healthcare.

In some cases, the goal of a master agreement is to standardize pay and benefit conditions in a market or industry so that employers compete on the grounds of quality services, quality products, or improved workplace safety.

Master contracts also make it easier for newly organized workers, who get rolled into existing contract rather than having to negotiate their own first contract (with the risk that negotiations may drag on or collapse, causing the new union to eventually collapse).

Traditionally, such contracts have been struck as exclusive class actions between the whole class of workers and the whole class of (or a single) employer(s), excluding the employment of any workers outside of it. In the United States in particular there has been pressure from the employing class generally on this.

== Strategy ==
When negotiating a master contract, the union often selects the financially strongest employer or worksite to negotiate with it. This agreement becomes the master contract, and sets the pattern for bargaining with the other employers or worksites.

Master contracts can also be used strategically for other ends such as organizing and to break down employer resistance to collective bargaining. In Canada, unions have used master contracts to organize thousands of new workers. A master agreement has tended to weaken an employer's resistance to the spread of the union to unorganized worksites or divisions, and some industries and markets welcome the standardization of pay and fringe benefits that unionization brings. In the United States, some unions have sought to create master agreements which provide for a neutrality agreement, code of conduct for the organizing election, or neutral third-party oversight of an election in order to make union organizing easier. Some master agreements even state that new workers will automatically come under the master agreement. Master bargaining also reduces the likelihood that employers will refuse to bargain or seek to whittle away at unionization workplace by workplace.

== Criticisms ==
Some union members criticize master contracts for submerging local differences, and for being undemocratic. Many critics point to master contracts which impose certain fundamental terms and conditions of employment (such as wages, fringe benefits, pensions and certain working conditions) as being nothing more than company unionism. In the United States, unions have engaged in bitter battles over such master agreements in California and Ohio.

In Australia, master contracts proved so contentious that they were essentially outlawed under the 1996 WorkChoices legislation and its 2005 amendments.
