= Australian labour movement =

Social and political movement

- National organization(s): ACTU
- Regulatory authority: Fair Work Commission
- Primary legislation: Fair Work Act 2009
- Total union membership: 1.6 million (August 2024)
- Percentage of workforce unionised: 13.1%

Global Rights Index
- 2 Repeated violations of rights

International Labour Organization
- Australia is a member of the ILO

Convention ratification
- Freedom of Association: 28 February 1973
- Right to Organise: 28 February 1973

The Australian labour movement began in the early 19th century and since the late 19th century has included industrial (Australian unions) and political wings (Australian Labor Party). Trade unions in Australia may be formed on the basis of craft unionism, general unionism, or industrial unionism. Almost all unions in Australia are affiliated with the Australian Council of Trade Unions (ACTU). Many unions have undergone a significant process of amalgamations, especially in the late 1980s and early 1990s. The leadership and membership of unions hold and have at other times held a wide range of political views, including socialist, democratic and right-wing views.

According to ABS figures, in August 2013, there were 1.7 million members of trade unions in relation to their main job (17% of all employees). A further 4% did not know whether they were trade union members or not, while 1% were trade union members not in conjunction with their main job. Of those who were a trade union member in relation to their main job, over two-thirds (68%) had been members for five years or more. Trade union membership has steadily declined over recent years, with 2013 being the lowest proportion in the history of the ABS series. According to ACTU figures, the number of members of trade unions in 1983 was 2,376,900 but by 2002 it was 1,833,700, and declining.

The Australian Labor Party at both a federal and state/colony level pre-dates, among others, both the British Labour Party and the New Zealand Labour Party in party formation, government, and policy implementation. In particular, the 1910 federal election represented a number of firsts: it was Australia's first elected federal majority government; Australia's first elected Senate majority; the world's first Labour Party majority government at a national level; after the 1904 Chris Watson minority government the world's second Labour Party government at a national level; and the first time it controlled both houses of a bicameral legislature.

== History ==
=== Early history ===
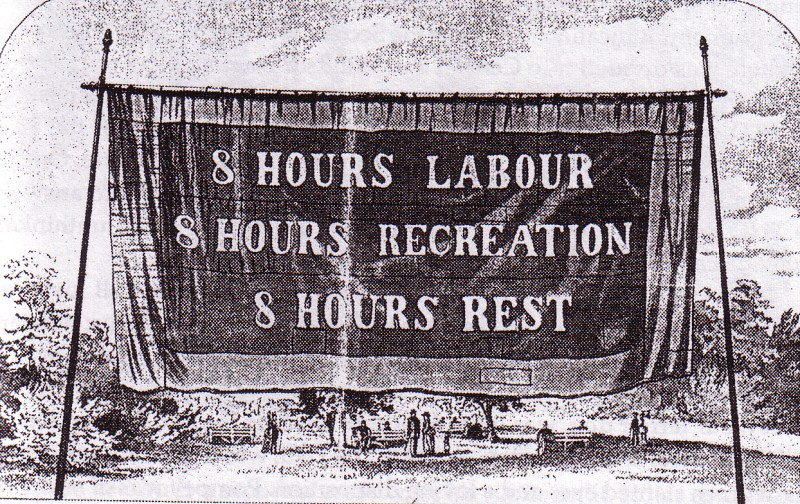
Eight-hour day banner, Melbourne, 1856

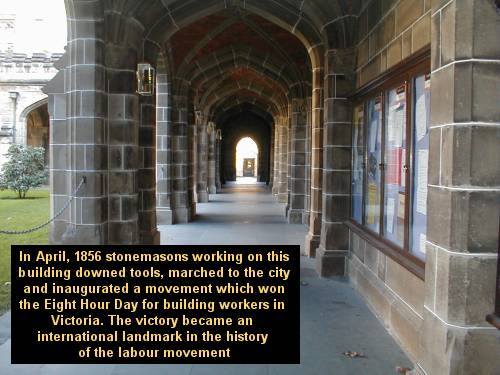
University of Melbourne site where Stonemasons won the 8-hour day in 1856

In 1788, the First Fleet landed in Sydney and subsequently established the colony of New South Wales as a penal colony. Working conditions were analogous to slavery, with convicts that were transported to the colony required to work, without pay, for either the colony's administration or private landholders. Others, particularly the "Kanaka" from the South Pacific islands, were either kidnapped or otherwise induced into exploitative long-term indentured service contracts.

Initially, following British laws, trade unions in Australia were suppressed, particularly under the Combination Act 1799 (39 Geo. 3. c. 81) and Combination Act 1800 (39 & 40 Geo. 3. c. 106). A trade union or other association could also be regarded as illegal because of being considered a "restraint of trade". The British Master and Servant Act 1823 (4 Geo. 4. c. 34), and subsequent updates, were generally regarded as heavily biased towards employers, and designed to discipline employees and repress the "combination" of workers in trade unions. The law required the obedience and loyalty from servants (i.e., workers) to their contracted employer, with infringements of the contract, or disobedience, subject to criminal penalties, often with a jail sentence of hard labour; and the calling for strikes was punished as an "aggravated" breach of contract. Over time though, the position was slowly liberalised and through the British Trade Union Act 1871 (34 & 35 Vict. c. 31), alongside the subsequent Conspiracy, and Protection of Property Act 1875 (38 & 39 Vict. c. 86), trade unions were legitimised. Craft unions in Australia began in the early 19th century as craft associations of highly skilled urban workers who sought to organise (form a labour union), to increase their low wages and decrease their high number of hours.

By 1902, the Master and Servant Act 1823 had been modified to include forfeit of wages if the written or unwritten contract for work was unfulfilled. Absence from place of work was punishable by imprisonment of up to three months with or without hard labour. There were also penalties of up to £10 for anyone who harboured, concealed or re-employed a 'servant' who had deserted or absconded or absented himself from his duty implied in the 'contract'. The act was used against workers organising for better conditions from its inception until well after the first United Kingdom Trade Union Act 1871 was implemented, which secured the legal status of trade unions. Under the Master and Servant Acts enacted in the Australian colonies in the 1840s, employees who left their employment without permission were subject to being hunted down under the Bushrangers Act. As little as one hour's absence by a free servant without permission could precipitate a punishment of prison or the treadmill. In the Melbourne jurisdiction, between 1835 and 1845, when labour shortages were acute, over 20% of prison inmates were convicted under the New South Wales Master and Servant Act for offences including leaving place of work without permission and being found in hotels.

==== Eight-hour day campaign ====
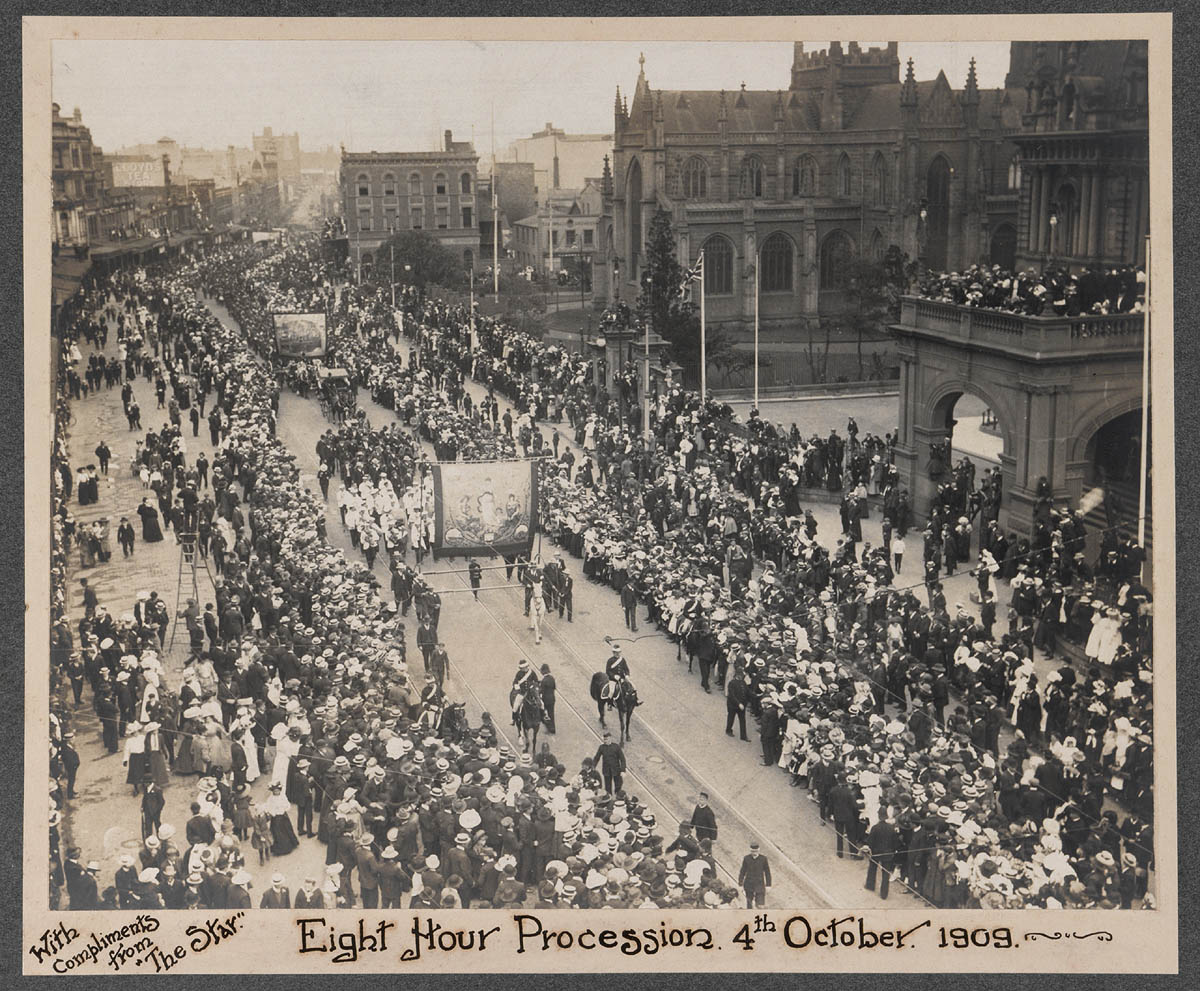
Eight Hour Procession, 4 October 1909

In the 1800s, most Victorians worked up to 14 hours a day, six days a week. There was no sick leave, no holiday leave, and employers could sack employees at any time, without giving a reason.

On 18 August 1855 the Stonemasons Society in Sydney issued an ultimatum to employers that in six months time, masons would only work an eight-hour day. However men working on the Holy Trinity Church (Garrison Church) in Argyle Cut, and on the Mariners Church, (an evangelical mission to seafarers, now an art gallery and café) in Lower George Street (98-100 George Street), could not contain their enthusiasm and decided not to wait. They pre-emptively went on strike, won the eight-hour day, and celebrated with a victory dinner on 1 October 1855. On 21 April 1856 Stonemasons led by Cooper Bridges, building workers on building sites around Melbourne stopped work and marched from the University of Melbourne to Parliament House to achieve an eight-hour day. Their direct action protest was a success, and they are noted as being among the first organised workers in the world to achieve the eight-hour day with no loss of pay.

It took further campaigning and struggles by trade unions to extend the reduction in hours to all workers in Australia. The Eight Hours Act 1916 (No. 11 (NSW)) was passed granting the eight-hour day to a wide range of workers in New South Wales. The eight-hour day was not achieved nationally until the 1920s, but that was in the context of a 48-hour week. The Commonwealth Arbitration Court gave approval of the 40-hour five-day working week nationally beginning on 1 January 1948.

==== Trades Halls ====
During 1856 the Melbourne Trades Hall Committee was formed and received a grant of land to build the Melbourne Trades Hall, which was completed in 1859. The Trades and Labor Council of Sydney was formed by eight unions in 1871, and Sydney Trades Hall was built between 1888 and 1895. The United Trades and Labour Council of South Australia has a history dating back to 1884.

==== 1890s great strikes ====
As the craft union movement broadened, less skilled and rural workers began to organise which led to the colonies of Australia being convulsed by a number of great strikes in the 1890s; The response to these events of union action saw the use of breakup actions. For Instance, the 1890 maritime strike was met by the New South Wales and Victorian armed forces to combat protestors. The 1891 shearers' strike in Queensland was broken after 13 union leaders were charged with sedition and conspiracy, and convicted. The 1892 Broken Hill miners' strike in New South Wales collapsed after several strike leaders were arrested and tried for 'unlawful conspiracy and inciting riots', found guilty and sentenced to imprisonment and it became unpracticable for locals to defend the mines from imported labour. In the 1894 shearers' strike sheep shearers in Queensland struck against poor conditions and wages that were being lowered, with the strike broken by the use of non-union labour and police.

Each of these industrial conflicts was seen as a demoralising blow for the labour movement. William Lane and many others sought refuge in building a new society called New Australia in Paraguay. Others in the labour movement, demoralised with direct action, turned to a political solution and sought election to colonial parliaments, and led to the formation of the Australian Labor Party.

==== Trade union banners ====
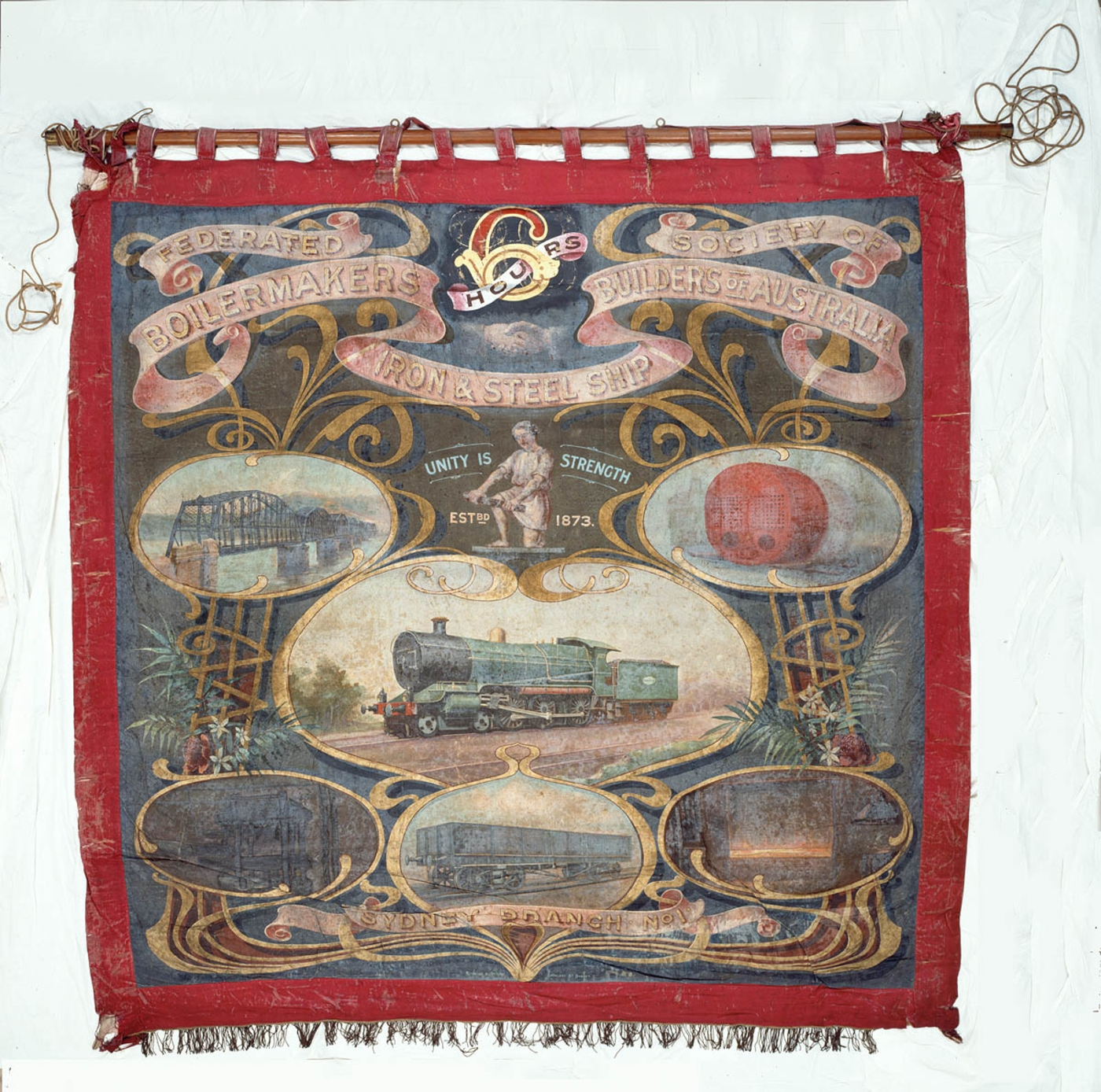
Federated Society of Boilermakers, Iron & Steel Shipbuilders of Australia Union banner

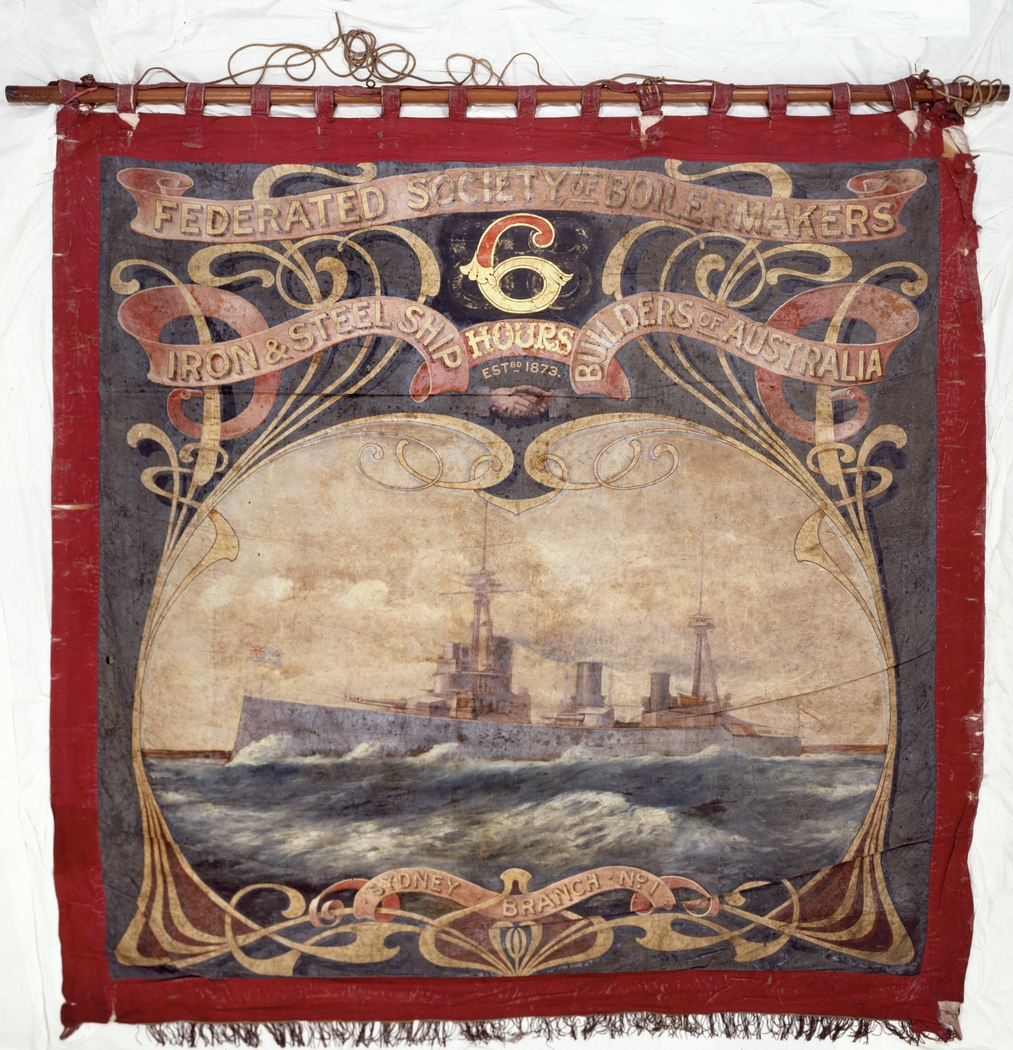
Banner back

In the late 19th and early 20th centuries, trade union banners were unfurled with pride in annual eight-hour day marches which advocated 'Eight Hours Labour, Eight Hours Recreation and Eight Hours Rest'. These marches were one of the most prominent annual celebrations staged in Australia by any group. In Sydney alone, by the early 20th century, thousands of unionists representing up to seventy different unions would take part in such parades, marching behind the banner emblematic of their trade. Most of these banners have not survived; Unions NSW has the largest surviving collection at Sydney Trades Hall in Sussex Street, Sydney.

The State Library of NSW has a small collection of trade union banners that were donated to the library in the early 1970s such as this photograph of a Federated Society of Boilermakers, Iron & Steel Shipbuilders of Australia banner thought to have been made c. 1913–1919. The banner features a kneeling figure in the centre surrounded by scroll work and is decorated with Australian native flowers and images representative of the work of union members such as a New South Wales Government Railways 34 class steam locomotive, the Hawkesbury River rail bridge built in 1889, and a furnace. The reverse of the banner shows the warship "Australia" at sea. The banner is painted on canvas.

==== Support for White Australia policy ====
Melbourne Trades Hall was opened in 1859 with Trades and Labour Councils and Trades Halls opening in all cities and most regional towns in the following forty years. During the 1880s Trade unions developed among shearers, miners, and stevedores (wharf workers), but soon spread to cover almost all blue-collar jobs. Shortages of labour led to high wages for a prosperous skilled working class, whose unions demanded and got an eight-hour day and other benefits unheard of in Europe.

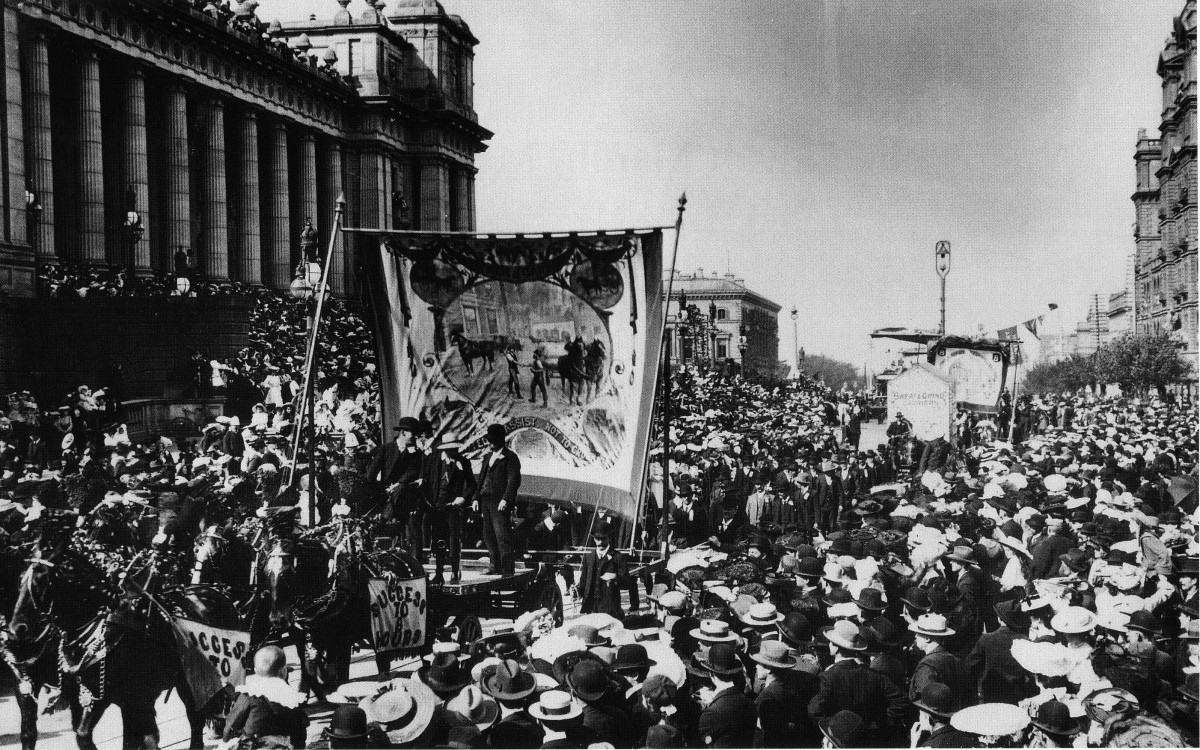
Eight-hour day march c. 1900, outside Parliament House in Spring Street, Melbourne

Australia gained a reputation as "the working man's paradise." Some employers tried to undercut the unions by importing Chinese labour. This produced a reaction which led to all the colonies restricting Chinese and other Asian immigration. This was the foundation of the White Australia Policy. The "Australian compact", based around centralised industrial arbitration, a degree of government assistance particularly for primary industries, and White Australia, was to continue for many years before gradually dissolving in the second half of the 20th century.

The growth of the sugar industry in Queensland in the 1870s led to searching for labourers prepared to work in a tropical environment. During this time, thousands of "Kanakas" (Pacific Islanders) were brought into Australia as indentured workers. This and related practices of bringing in non-white labour to be cheaply employed was commonly termed "blackbirding" and refers to the recruitment of people through trickery and kidnappings to work on plantations, particularly the sugar cane plantations of Queensland (Australia) and Fiji. In the 1870s and 1880s, the growing trade union movement began a series of protests against foreign labour. Their arguments were that Asians and Chinese took jobs away from white men, worked for "substandard" wages, lowered working conditions and refused unionisation.

Objections to these arguments came largely from wealthy land owners in rural areas. It was argued that without Asiatics to work in the tropical areas of the Northern Territory and Queensland, the area would have to be abandoned. Despite these objections to restricting immigration, between 1875 and 1888 all Australian colonies enacted legislation which excluded all further Chinese immigration. Asian immigrants already residing in the Australian colonies were not expelled and retained the same rights as their Anglo and Southern compatriots.

Agreements were made to further increase these restrictions in 1895 following an Inter-colonial Premier's Conference where all colonies agreed to extend entry restrictions to all non-white races. However, in attempting to enact this legislation, the governors of New South Wales, South Australia and Tasmania reserved the bills, due to a treaty with Japan, and they did not become law. Instead, the Natal Act of 1897 was introduced, restricting "undesirable persons" rather than any specific race.

The British government in London was not pleased with legislation that discriminated against certain subjects of its Empire, but decided not to disallow the laws that were passed. Colonial Secretary Joseph Chamberlain explained in 1897:

We quite sympathise with the determination...of these colonies...that there should not be an influx of people alien in civilisation, alien in religion, alien in customs, whose influx, moreover, would seriously interfere with the legitimate rights of the existing labouring population.

The Barton government which came to power following the first elections to the Commonwealth parliament in 1901 was formed by the Protectionist Party with the support of the Australian Labor Party. The support of the Labor Party was contingent upon restricting non-white immigration, reflecting the attitudes of the Australian Workers Union and other labour organisations at the time, upon whose support the Labor Party was founded.

Ted Grayndler general secretary of the Australian Workers' Union (AWU) (1912-1941), and Tom Dougherty (1944-1972) supported the White Australia Policy.

The AWU abandoned its support for the White Australia policy in 1972.

=== Growth of the trade and industrial unions ===
At the beginning of the 20th century, the union movement was in disarray across Australia. Only a few tough craft unions had survived. The majority of workers were un-unionised. A variety of skilled organisers turned this around and achieved remarkably high union membership density rates by 1914.

The threats of wild cat industrial action on a national level convinced the Federal Parliament to adopt a system of compulsory registration of unions, and compulsory arbitration in disputes. The Conciliation and Arbitration Act was assented to in 1904, and dictated the terrain of industrial relations conflicts and unionism until the 1990s.

In part this was caused by two new ideas of unionism: trade unionism and industrial unionism. Trade unionists sought to organise all people engaged in the same trade on job sites. Rather than simply organising the ditch diggers into one craft union and the dirt movers into another craft union, trade unionists sought to organise all people who moved earth into one union.

Industrial unionism went one step further, claiming that all workers on one worksite, diggers, plasterers, engine drivers, cleaners, caterers, engineers, accountants and clerks should belong to one union, as part of a "construction industry." Industrial unionists sought to organise all workers into One Big Union which could then conduct a strike across the entire society and peacefully usher in socialism. The 1912 Brisbane General Strike showed the combined power of the labour movement, effectively operating as an alternative social administration for five weeks, undermining the power of the conservative government.

At the time there was no real conflict or division between the trade and industrial union mentality. Many supporters of the ALP in the Trades and Labour Councils were radical, militant and supported socialism.

=== Politics ===
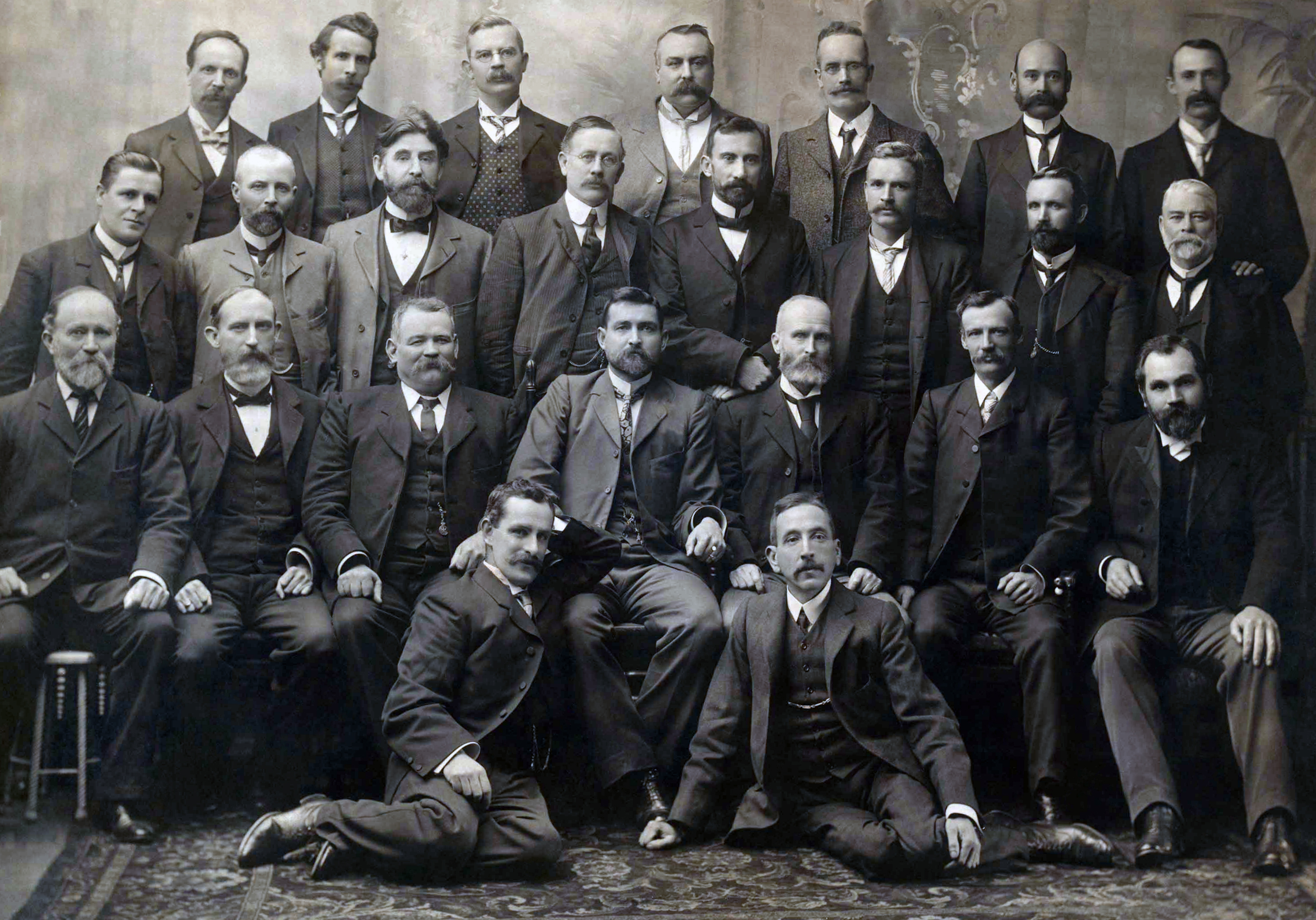
Federal Labour Party MPs elected at the inaugural 1901 election, including Chris Watson, Andrew Fisher, Billy Hughes, Frank Tudor, and King O'Malley

The failure of each of the industrial conflicts of the 1890s was seen as a demoralising blow for the labour movement. Some unionists, demoralised with direct action, turned to a political solution and sought election to colonial parliaments, and led to the formation of the Australian Labor Party. The first general election contested by Labour candidates was the 1891 New South Wales election, where Labour Electoral League of New South Wales candidates won 35 of 141 seats, giving Labour the balance of power. Also in 1891, three United Labor Party (ULP) of South Australia candidates were elected to the South Australian Legislative Council. At the 1893 South Australian election the United Labor Party led by John McPherson won 10 of the 54 seats and the balance of power in the House of Assembly, allowing the liberal government of Charles Kingston to be formed, ousting the conservative government of John Downer. By the 1905 South Australian election Thomas Price became the first Labor Premier of South Australia. Re-elected at the 1906 double dissolution election serving until his death in 1909, it was the world's first stable Labour Party government. So successful, John Verran led Labor to form the state's first of many majority governments at the 1910 South Australian election.

Labour candidates emerged in the late 19th century with much success, being a part of informal coalition governments from the early 1890s. In 1899, Anderson Dawson formed a Labour minority government in Queensland, the first Labour government in the world, which lasted one week while the conservatives regrouped after a split. . The first national Labour government in the world was that of Chris Watson in 1904, whose government lasted four months. Labour held the balance of power in the early years of federation, and was able to use it to secure the setting up of the protectionist system in Australia, and the passage of the Commonwealth Conciliation and Arbitration Act 1904, to set up a compulsory arbitration system in Australia. In the 1870s and 1880s, the trade union movement had organised a series of protests against "foreign" (by which was meant non-Anglo-Saxon) labour. Their arguments were that Asians and Chinese took jobs away from white men, worked for "substandard" wages, lowered working conditions and refused unionisation. The movement gave support to the White Australia policy following federation, which involved the expulsion of the Kanakas (South Pacific islanders) and stopping all immigration of non-white people.

A scandalised establishment, took measures to counter Labour's growing electoral dominance. Believing that an anti-socialist alliance was necessary, it pressured Deakin and Anti-Socialist Party's new leader, Joseph Cook, to begin merger talks. The main body of Protectionists, including Deakin and his supporters, merged with the Anti-Socialist Party in May 1909 to become the Commonwealth Liberal Party. The more liberal Protectionists joined Labour.

The 1910 federal election was a straight two-party contest between Labour and the combined anti-Labour forces. The election delivered total victory to Labour under the leadership of Andrew Fisher. It delivered the first national Labour majority government in the world, the first national majority government in Australia, and the first Senate majority in Australia.

The Fisher government was able to pass 113 Acts in the three years of the government, an unprecedented record, a period of reform unmatched in the Commonwealth up until that point. The Fisher government carried out many reforms dear to the labour movement in defence, constitutional matters, finance, transport and communications, and social security. They included: establishing old-age and disability pensions; a maternity allowance for new mothers; workers compensation; issuing Australia's first paper currency; starting the Trans-Australian Railway; expanding the High Court of Australia; founding Canberra; and establishing the government-owned Commonwealth Bank.

The party's state branches formed their first majority governments in New South Wales and South Australia in 1910, in Western Australia in 1911, and in Queensland in 1915. Such success eluded equivalent social democratic and labour parties in other countries for many years.

=== World War I ===
The Australian labour movement united around opposition to conscription, largely due to vocal opposition by the IWW and Catholic archbishop of Melbourne, Daniel Mannix. Two referendum proposals to introduce conscription by Labor Prime Minister Billy Hughes were defeated, making Australia and South Africa the only nations at war during the First World War not to introduce conscription. The Labor governments of Hughes in the Federal sphere, and William Holman in New South Wales, were held in low regard by much of the labour movement due to their policies on military conscription.

The chief proponent of industrial unionism in Australia was the Industrial Workers of the World, which actively sought out conflicts with management. The IWW also acted on a political plane, opposing boyhood conscription, then the first world war. On 23 September 1916 twelve members of the IWW (most of them active organisers) were arrested and charged with treason under the Treason Felony Act (1848). As four buildings had been deliberately damaged by fire, the charge of arson was added to the charges. They became known as the Sydney Twelve with in the labour movement actively campaigning for their release for several years. The Unlawful Associations Act (1916) was rushed through Federal Parliament in late December and the IWW was declared an illegal organisation. The IWW simply changed its name to Workers' Defence and Release Committee, and continued as normal. In late July 1917 the Act was amended resulting in any organisation or individual able to be easily proscribed. In return the IWW ran a 'free speech movement' campaign in which over 80 members in Sydney were sentenced to 6 months hard labour (the maximum) for simply proclaiming their membership, which was enough to scare many others away from open defiance. Those not born in Australia were subsequently deported at the end of their sentences, mostly to Chile. A chain of international protests about the Sydney Twelve IWW prisoners followed.

At the end of the first world war in Australia there were a number of major industrial and political actions which threatened the stability of society. In Queensland counter-revolutionary and racist riots broke out in the Red Flag Riots, when it was made illegal to fly or wear the red flag, except as a sign of danger. The New South Wales General Strike of 1917 started on 2 August 1917, by railway workers over the introduction of the Taylor system of determining where work could be speeded-up. It was the most widespread labour upheaval since the 1890s, and ended when mining workers returned to work on 15 October 1917.

=== Interwar period ===
The Communist Party of Australia was formed in October 1920 by a group of Trades Hall radicals that included Jock Garden, the members of the illegal IWW, and members of earlier socialist organisations in Australia. The party achieved some influence in the trade union movement in New South Wales, but by the mid-1920s it had dwindled to an insignificant sect, and Garden and other communists were expelled from the Labor Party in 1924. However, the Communist Party began to win positions in particular trade unions, such as the Miners Federation and the Waterside Workers' Federation of Australia.

Strikes in this period were commonplace, and remained threatening to the Commonwealth government, which took measures to control union activity. In 1926 the federal Crimes Act was amended for the Act to apply to unions and in 1928 the Transport Workers Act 1928 (more commonly referred as the Dog Collar Act) was enacted, directed against the Waterside Workers' Federation. Of particular note is the 1923 Victorian Police strike.

Trade union membership was 703,000 in 1921 and reached its peak in 1927, according to Green and Cromwell, when trade union membership "comprised less than 15 per cent of the whole population, only 47 per cent of the workforce." In 1931 union membership was 769,000.

==== The Great Depression ====
After the Transport Workers Act 1928, more widely known as The Dog Collar Act, was passed, the Australian union movement sought to protect itself by forming a permanent national trade union organisation, the Australian Council of Trade Unions. By this point the idea of trade unionism had won out over industrial unionism. This was in part encouraged by the industrial courts which freely gave registration to small, shop and trade-specific unions. While the Communist Party of Australia would always argue for industrial unions, the idea of industrial unions smouldered until the 1960s, and only received support from the ACTU and the ALP in the 1980s.

The Dog Collar Act was used to break up strong unions, in forestry and on the docks. These unions were perceived to be revolutionary, or at least militant. At the same time the fragmented trade unions sought to maintain member conditions in an environment of massive unemployment. For instance, rates of male unemployment in the industrial city of Newcastle never dropped below 20% throughout the 1920s. When the Great Depression hit, formal unemployment rates rose above 30%.

The 1929 Australian timber workers' strike was the first large strike during the depression when Justice Lukin handed down a new timber industry award that increased the working week from 44 to 48 hours and reduced wages. During the strike Lukin ordered a secret ballot to be held which was the first attempt to enforce a secret ballot in an industrial dispute.

A 15-month lockout during 1929–1930 of miners on the northern New South Wales coalfields was particularly bitter. The Rothbury riot resulted in police shooting at miners, killing Norman Brown and seriously injuring many more.

The trade union response to unemployment was not inspiring. Before the depression, some strong trade unions would provide welfare for unemployed members, and seek jobs for them. However, the depression rendered this system unworkable, where it existed at all. (Union welfare primarily existed in seasonal work with militant unions, like dock-working. It was precisely these unions that were attacked by the Dog Collar Act).

In response to the depression, the remains of the IWW set up a union for the unemployed. This idea was quickly taken up by both the CPA and the ALP, both of which established associations (not organised as unions of workers) for the unemployed. The militance of unemployed workers who identified with the CPA or ALP, and the spirit of universal unionism which remained from the IWW, changed these movements of the unemployed into effective unions. The unemployed unions attacked local councils, and occasionally landlords, in order to win conditions. Infamously, a series of CPA inspired riots occurred against evictions in Newtown, Bankstown, Newcastle and Wollongong. The unemployed movements did not win significant employment, payment or condition victories for the unemployed workers. No future union of the unemployed would ever match the achievements of the unemployed unions of the 1930s.

As Australia approached the Second World War, the Dalfram dispute of 1938 in Port Kembla showed that trade unions and workers were not afraid to take strike action on political issues, in this case the export of pig iron to a military aggressive Japan invading China. Although workers returned to work after 10 weeks and 2 days on strike, the Transport Workers Act of 1928 (The Dog Collar Act) had been shown to be ineffective when concerted action and solidarity was undertaken. Attorney General Robert Menzies earned his nickname of Pig Iron Bob during this dispute as a result of significant union protest.

=== World War II and after ===
World War II created a significant feeling of sympathy for the Soviet Union among Australian workers, and the CPA attempted to take advantage of this by industrial agitation after the war in the 1948 Queensland Railway strike and the 1949 Australian coal strike (the first time the military were used in peacetime to break a strike), and disputes on the waterfront and in the meat industry. This attempt to seize control of the union movement failed and was the start of the decline in communist leadership and influence in the labour movement. At the same time, agitation by Catholic organisations such as the National Civic Council (or Groupers) started setting up Industrial Groups within unions to counter the influence of communists.

The 1950s and 1960s period were generally one of industrial peace, dictated by preference agreements and closed shops. This period saw union membership keep pace with the growth of the workforce.

The post-war years saw the Australian labour movement support Indigenous Australians in their fight for human rights, cultural rights and native title, through supporting the 1946 Pilbara strike, The Gurindji Strike at Wave Hill in the Northern Territory, equal pay for Aboriginal people and Torres Strait Islanders, and support for the Noonkanbah people in their land rights dispute with the Western Australian Government over mining companies disturbing sacred sites.

During the 1960s, a number of unions became locked in contests with governments and employers. Governments relied on penal powers to keep union activists in line. The general strike over Clarrie O'Shea's imprisonment broke the government law and ushered in a period of rising union demands. These demands existed in the context of a general social radicalisation under Gough Whitlam and Malcolm Fraser.

The militant wave was broken by the Australian Labor Party's Prices and Incomes Accord in 1984 under Labor Prime Minister Bob Hawke. After 1984 industrial militance declined, and a newly amalgamated trade union movement presided over falls in real wages. In the 1985 Mudginberri dispute and the 1986 Dollar Sweet's dispute employer organisations such as the National Farmers Federation successfully backed legal sanctions to defeat union industrial action. The 1989 Australian pilots' strike saw the Federal Labor government using RAAF planes and pilots to break industrial action by the Australian Federation of Air Pilots, taken outside the Prices and Incomes Accord.

During the Hawke Labor government in the 1980s, Australia experienced a push for economic reform encompassing deregulation of a number of previously regulated markets, including the labour market. This was first pursued by the Keating Labor government in 1991, through the Enterprise Bargaining Agreements introduced into Australia under the Prices and Incomes Accord in 1991 (Mark VII). They later became the centrepiece of the Australian industrial relations system when the Accord was next revised in 1993 (Mark VIII). This ended nearly a century of centralised wage-fixing based industrial relations.

Under the post-1996 Howard Liberal government, increasing pressure was brought to bear on industrial relations reforms, aiming to reduce the industrial power of Australian trade unions. This included the introduction of Australian Workplace Agreements — individual contractual agreements on pay and conditions between an employee and employer — and the reduction of minimum conditions contained in Industrial awards. One of the first targets of the conservative Government was to undermine the power of the Maritime Union of Australia, through breaking its closed shop on waterfront labour. The 1998 Australian waterfront dispute resulted with the stevedoring firm, Patrick Corporation under CEO Chris Corrigan, attempting to sack its entire waterfront workforce of 1400 people through company restructuring. The Australian Council of Trade Unions condemned the sacking as a gross act of collusion between Patrick, the Government, and the National Farmers Federation, and with the threat of legal action against the Government and Patrick Corporation, a settlement was negotiated to allow some reform with the MUA retaining its effective closed shop.

When the Howard Liberal government won an unexpected Senate majority at the 2004 election, despite not being part of their election manifesto they took the opportunity to introduce WorkChoices, a decision which would ultimately seal their fate at the 2007 election.

==== WorkChoices ====
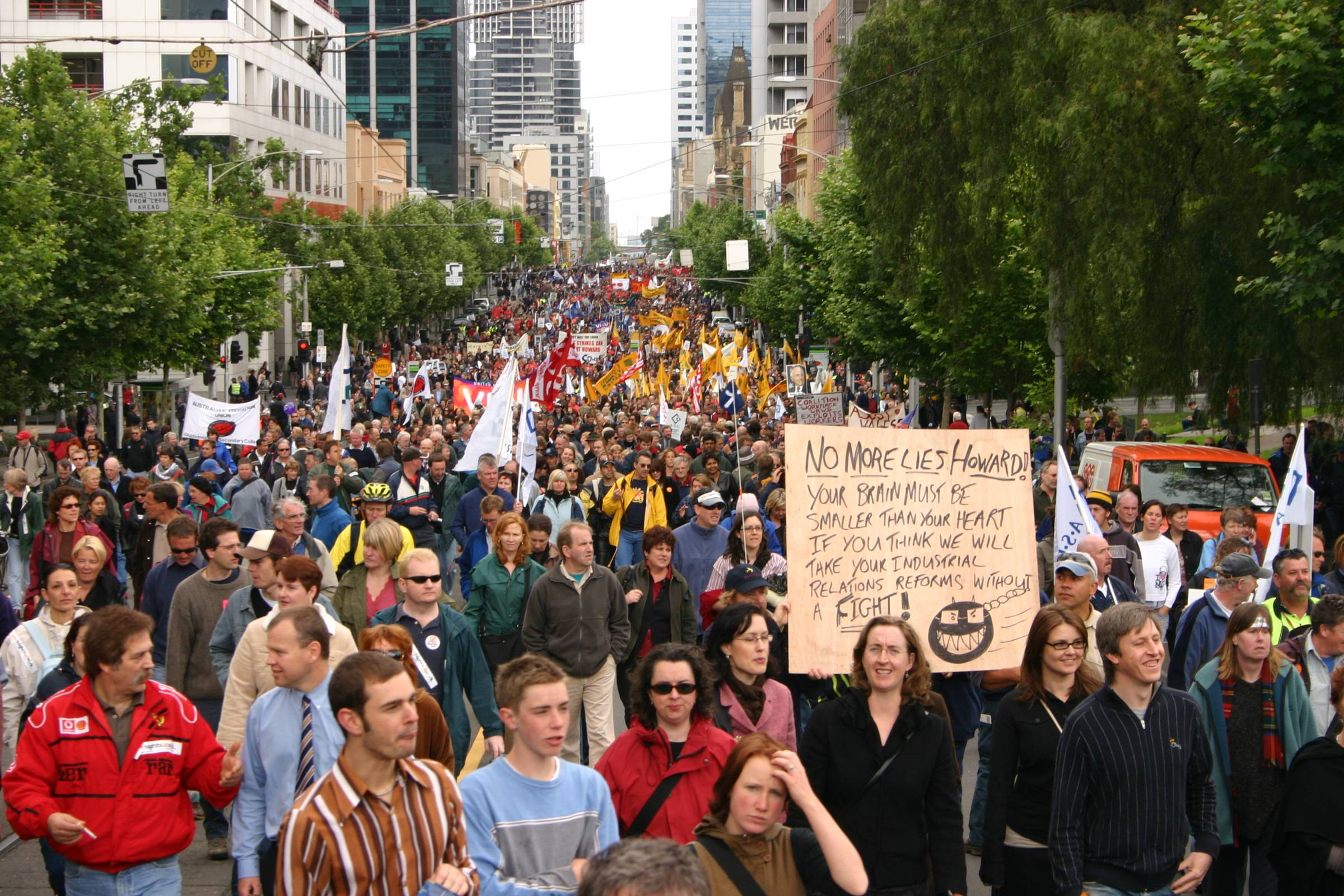
A view of the rally in La Trobe Street, Melbourne, giving an indication of the size of the crowd

After the Howard Liberal government's 2004 election victory, and with a majority in the Senate from 1 July 2005, changes to industrial laws to further reduce the collective bargaining power of trade unions continued. In May 2005 the Howard government announced its Industrial Relations changes known as WorkChoices. This legislation received widespread criticism from the Australian union movement, many religious and community groups and, significantly (but not widely reported), the International Labour Organization, of which Australia is a member.

On 30 June 2005, up to 100,000 people marched through Melbourne in opposition to the proposed industrial relations changes, with meetings also held in capital cities and regional towns around Australia.

On 15 November 2005, the ACTU organised a national day of protest, during which the ACTU estimated 546,000 people took part in marches and protests in Australia's state capitals and other cities. The rallies were addressed by State premiers and religious leaders. Other notable Australians, including former Prime Minister Bob Hawke, also spoke in opposition to the industrial relations changes. John Howard said that the protests will not change his policy and employer groups estimated that 95% of the workforce did not attend.

The Bill was passed by the Senate, with minor amendments, by a vote of 35-33 on 2 December 2005 and received the Royal Assent on 14 December.

Following the defeat of the Howard Liberal government at the 2007 federal election, the Rudd Labor government moved quickly to outlaw Australian Workplace Agreements (AWAs) besides other changes.

WorkChoices legislation was superseded by the Fair Work Act 2009 on 1 July 2009 which, whilst seen as an improvement for workers, has attracted criticism from industry experts, the Australian Greens and organised labour, especially the Victorian Branch of the Electrical Trades Union. In May 2009 the findings of a secret report on the new legislation, commissioned by the executive of the Australian Council of Trade Unions (ACTU), were revealed. The report found that "the act does not bring our laws into compliance with ILO standards". Geoff Borenstein, an in-house solicitor of the ETU stated that the Fair Work legislation breaches ILO conventions regarding the right to strike, industrial action generally and restrictions on the content of industrial instruments (awards, collective agreements &c). Professor Ron McCallum of the University of Sydney asserts that the new legislation will "probably" be deemed a breach of international law by the International Labour Organization, particularly in regards to ILO Conventions 87 and 98.

== 457 visas ==
The "Temporary Business (Long Stay)" (subclass 457) visa was introduced soon after John Howard became Prime Minister in 1996. It soon became the most common visa for Australian or overseas employers to sponsor skilled overseas workers to work temporarily in Australia. From 2013, the visa became strongly criticised by Australian unions and others. It was replaced by the "Temporary Skill Shortage Visa" (subclass 482) on 18 March 2018 by the Turnbull government.

== Overseas farm workers ==
=== Pacific labour scheme ===
In 2012 the Australian government introduced a seasonal worker scheme under the 416 and 403 visas to bring in Pacific Islander labour to work in the agricultural industry performing tasks such as picking fruit. By 2018, around 17,320 Islanders, mostly from Vanuatu, Fiji and Tonga, had been employed with the majority being placed on farms in Queensland. Workers under this programme have often been subject to working long hours in extreme temperatures and being forced to live in squalid conditions. Poor access to clean water, adequate food and medical assistance has resulted in at least 12 deaths. These reports together with allegations of workers receiving as little as $10 a week after rent and transport deductions resulted in the "Harvest Trail Inquiry" into the conditions of migrant horticultural workers. The ACTU and other labour groups gave evidence. This inquiry confirmed widespread exploitation, intimidation and underpayment of workers with at least 55% of employers being non-compliant in regard to payments and conditions. (As was then standard in the industry, many workers were contracted under a "piece rate" of pay with no written agreement and no minimum hourly rate.) Even though some wages were recovered and a number of employers and contractors were fined, the inquiry found that much more regulation was needed. Despite this report, the government expanded the programme in 2018 with the Pacific Labour Scheme which included three year contracts. Critics have decried the scheme as modern day blackbirding with sixteen labourer deaths occurring between 2019 and 2021. After 1,181 seasonal workers ran away from their employers amidst allegations of inhumane conditions, the Australian government launched a campaign in 2021 warning the pickers that they would bring shame to their families if they absconded.

=== Backpacker schemes ===
Slavery-like exploitation of young foreign tourists as agricultural labourers during the 2010s and 2020s on the subclass 417 Working Holiday visa have also been reported. On this visa these tourists, usually backpackers, are obligated to work 88 days in regional areas in order to get approval for the second year of the visa. Widespread sexual harassment, wages as low as $2.50 to $4 an hour and blackmail have been described.

The introduction of the Modern Slavery Act 2018 into Australian law was partly based upon concerns of slavery being evident in the agricultural sector. Further to this, a landmark provisional ruling by the Fair Work Commission in November 2021 ruled that farm workers in Australia on piece rates must be paid a minimum wage of $25.41 an hour.

=== Undocumented farm workers ===
In 2021 there were estimated 60,000 to 100,000 undocumented migrant workers labouring in the Australian agricultural industry. Poorly regulated migration agents entice many of these people to Australia on invalid visas and then in conjunction with farmers, force them to work off their debts in regional agricultural districts. Some are paid only around $30 a day for back-breaking work, forced to rent substandard housing, have poor access to health care, and are subject to abuse and sexual harassment. This exploitative labour system is openly acknowledged to be propping up many aspects of the Australian farm sector, and there appears to be little desire to implement any meaningful government regulation.

== See also ==
- Australian labour law
- List of trade unions in Australia
- Australian Labor Party
