= Master contract =

Master contract or master agreement may refer to:

- Master contract (labor), agreement between a trade union and employer(s) which frames local negotiations.
- Master service agreement, agreement between a client and a supplier regarding terms of work (common among professional contractors).
