= Fairness test =

The "fairness test" was a central concept of the WorkChoices industrial relations laws that operated in Australia from 2006 to 2010.

It was implemented in the Workplace Relations Amendment (A Stronger Safety Net) Act 2007, which came into operation on 1 July 2007. The Act saw the renaming of the then Office of Workplace Services, which became the Workplace Ombudsman, and the creation of the Workplace Authority, combining the former Office of the Employment Advocate and parts of the then Department of Employment and Workplace Relations, now the Department of Education, Employment and Workplace Relations.

The fairness test operated retrospectively from 7 May 2007. The test was introduced by the then Howard government as a “fine-tuning” of WorkChoices, but received criticism from both employer associations (due to the complexity and additional burden to businesses) and trade unions including the Transport Workers Union (for not providing adequate protections to employees).

The fairness test applied to all Collective Agreements and Australian Workplace Agreements (AWAs) lodged with the Workplace Authority between 7 May 2007 and 10 April 2008 (signed on or before 27 March 2008), where employees earned under $75,000 base annual salary (for AWAs only) and worked in industries or occupations usually covered by awards and where the CA or AWA removed or modified protected Award conditions. Protected award conditions included penalty rates and loadings (including overtime penalties, weekend and public holiday rates, shift loadings and annual leave loading), monetary allowances, public holidays, rest breaks and incentive based payments and bonuses.

Where protected award conditions had been varied or removed, agreements had to provide ‘adequate compensation’ to employees. The Workplace Authority had to take into consideration the particular circumstances of the employee/s, such as their pattern of work. Adequate compensation could include monetary benefits (such as a higher base rate of pay), or non-monetary benefits (such as child care or a parking space) of ‘significant value’ to the employee.

The fairness test applied where a business was, prior to 27 March 2006, bound to a State Award, which became a Notional Agreement Preserving a State Award (NAPSA), a Federal Award, or where the work done by the employee was in an industry or occupation which would have been covered by an Award or NAPSA prior to 27 March 2006. Where the business was not bound to a particular Award or NAPSA, the Workplace Authority could designate a Federal Award for the purposes of the fairness test.

If an agreement did not pass the fairness test, the Workplace Authority notified the employer and allowed them the opportunity to vary the agreement in order to pass. If the agreement was not varied or the variation did not pass the fairness test, the agreement did not apply at all, and the employee derived their minimum terms and conditions at work from the industrial instrument (agreement, Award or NAPSA) otherwise capable of applying to the employee Where an employee was previously not covered by any industrial instrument (an ‘Award-free’ employee) but had an Award designated for the purpose of the fairness test, the protected Award conditions continued to apply to the employee.

The fairness test did not check agreements for prohibited content or compliance with the Australian Fair Pay and Conditions Standard.

== Abolition of fairness test ==
The Workplace Relations Amendment (Transition to Forward with Fairness) Act 2008 (see Workchoices) (the Forward with Fairness Act) came into operation on 28 March 2008. It removed the fairness test for agreements made on or after 28 March 2008 (for AWAs signed on or before 27 March 2008, the 14-day lodgement period remained), and instead introduced the new "no disadvantage" test.
