= Robert Jammes =

French linguist (1927–2020)

- Born: 26 April 1927; Casablanca, French Protectorate in Morocco
- Died: 12 October 2020 (aged 93); Villefranche-de-Lauragais, France
- Occupation: Linguist

Robert Jammes (26 April 1927 – 12 October 2020) was a French linguist, specializing in the Spanish language.

== Biography ==
Born in 1927, Jammes studied at the École normale supérieure in Paris, where he earned an agrégation in Spanish. He first taught at the Lycée de Carcassonne from 1951 to 1953, then as a teaching assistant at the University of Montpellier from 1953 to 1958. He was a teaching officer at Grenoble Alpes University from 1957 to 1962 before working for the French National Centre for Scientific Research from 1962 to 1965. Most notably, he was a professor at the University of Toulouse-Jean Jaurès from 1965 until his retirement in 1987.

Relative to his teaching, Jammes dedicated his research to the Spanish Golden Age and the works of Spanish poet Luis de Góngora. With the help of his colleagues in Toulouse, he was able to organize a research group dedicated to the Spanish Golden Age, which launched the journal Criticón, which continues to this day. In addition to his teaching career, he has also served as a judge in multiple university competitions.

Robert Jammes died in Villefranche-de-Lauragais on 12 October 2020 at the age of 93.

== Publications ==
- Études sur l’œuvre poétique de don Luis de Góngora y Argote (1967)
- Rétrogongorisme (1978)
- Poesia erótica del Siglo de Oro (1984)
- Anuario aureo (1985)
- Vingt-six versions espagnoles traduites et commentées (1987)
- Une autre Espagne du Siècle d'Or (1988)
- Glosario de voces anotadas en los 100 primeros volumenes (1993)
- Histoire de la littérature espagnole d'expression castillane (1994)
- Vocabulario de refranes y frases proverbiales (1627). Edition de Louis Combet (1967), revue et modernisée par Robert Jammes et Maité Mir-Andreu (2000)
- Comprendre Góngora. Anthologie bilingue présentée et traduite par Robert Jammes (2009)
