= André Jammes =

French bookseller and photography historian (1927–2026)

- Born: 14 June 1927; Paris, France
- Died: 15 January 2026 (aged 98); Paris, France
- Occupations: Bookseller; Photography historian

André Jammes (French: [ɑ̃dʁe ʒam]; 14 June 1927 – 15 January 2026) was a French bookseller and photography historian.

== Life and career ==
Born in the 6th arrondissement of Paris on 14 June 1927, Jammes was the son of Paul Jammes, who founded a bookstore in the Saint-Germain-des-Prés quarter. Jammes and his brother, Pierre, succeeded their father as owners. As a specialist in antique books, he also passionately collected old photographs and wrote books on printing techniques, typography, and calligraphy. On 13 June 1961, he organized the first auction in Europe to be centered around photographs at the Librairie Nicolas Rauch in Geneva. He participated in the foundation of the Musée de l'Imprimerie in Lyon in 1964. In 2008, he and his wife, Marie-Thérèse, began to sell off their antique photographs, which Sotheby's described as the "sale of the century".

Jammes died in Paris on 15 January 2026, at the age of 98.

== Publications ==
- Essai sur les ex-libris modernes français (1947)
- Les Petits Romantiques français (1949)
- La Réforme de la typographie royale sous Louis XIV : Le Grandjean (1961)
- Charles Nègre photographe : 1820-1880 (1963)
- L'Estampe : cinq siècles de recherches et de technique (1964)
- Essai sur la lettre d'imprimerie. À propos des collections conservées au Musée de l'imprimerie et de la banque (1968)
- William H. Fox Talbot: Inventor of the Negative-Positive Process (1973)
- Hippolyte Bayard : ein verkannter Erfinder und Meister der Photographie (1975)
- Nadar. Introduction, repères chronologiques, notes bibliographiques et techniques (1982)
- The Art of French Calotype. With a Critical Dictionary of Photographers, 1845-1870 (1983)
- Didotiana (1994)
- Spécimens de caractères de Firmin et Jules Didot (2002)
- Collection de spécimens de caractères : 1517-2004 (2006)
- Alde, Renouard & Didot : bibliophilie & bibliographie (2008)
- Libri vaincu : enquêtes policières et secrets bibliographiques, documents inédits (2008)
- Papiers dominotés. Trait d'union entre l'imagerie populaire et les papiers peints : France 1750-1820 (2010)
- L’Imprimerie polytype : une officine expérimentale et clandestine au service du duc d'Orléans, 1783-1787 (2012)
- Relier Rimbaud. Conversations (2014)
- Images populaires (2017)

== Distinctions ==
- Prix Nadar (1964)
- Commander of the Ordre des Arts et des Lettres (2009)
- Prix SNA-Café Marly du Livre d'Art (2011)
