= Australian industrial relations legislation national day of protest, 2005 =

Coordinates: 37.817798°S 144.968714°E

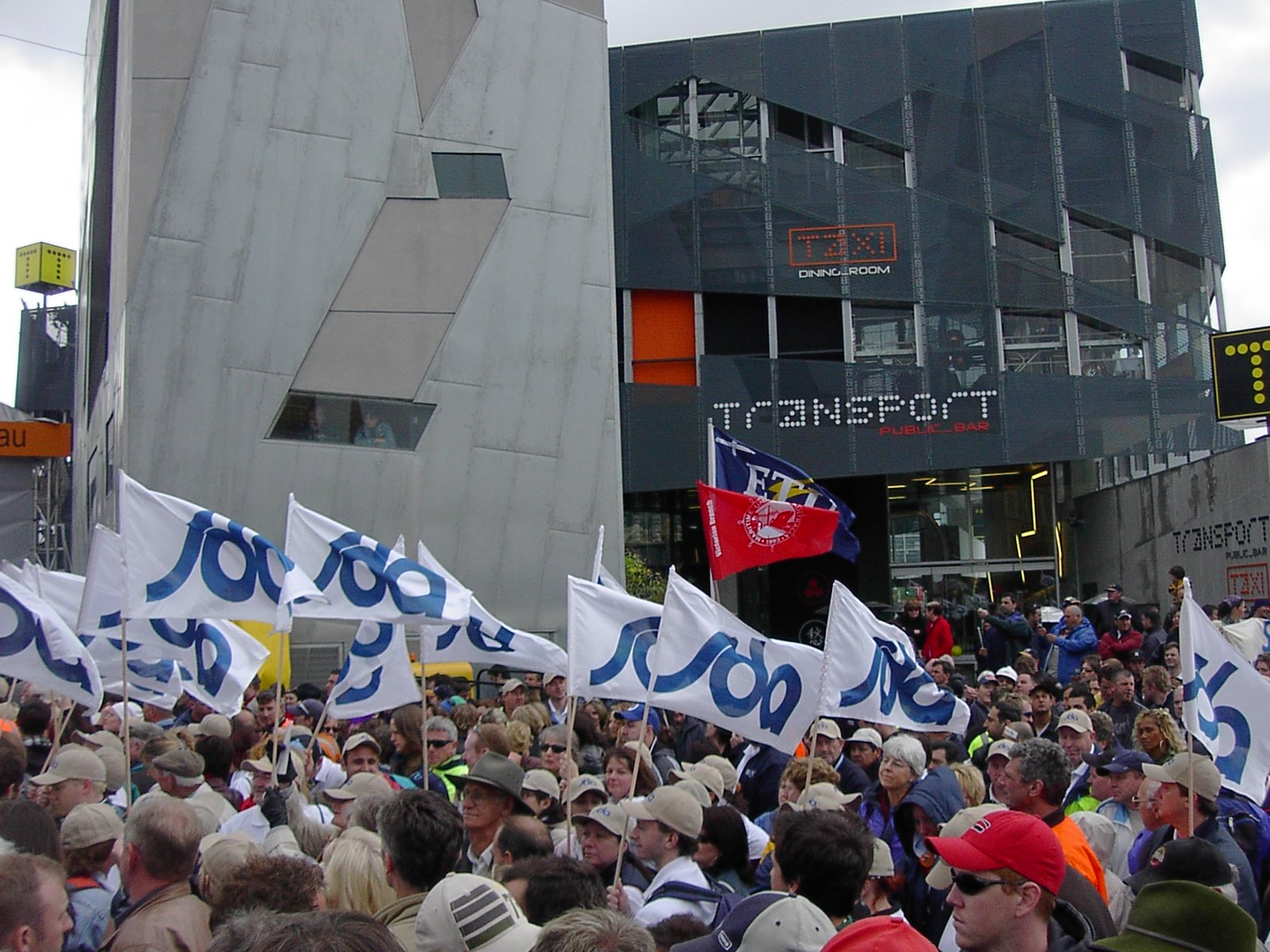
Trade union supporters rally at Federation Square in Melbourne. The blue and white flags are the banners of the Shop, Distributive and Allied Employees Association (SDA)

A national day of protest was held in Australia on 15 November 2005, to protest against the industrial relations legislation being introduced by the government of Prime Minister John Howard. The day was organised by the Australian Council of Trade Unions (ACTU) and its state, territory and local affiliates, with the support of the Australian Labor Party, the Australian Greens, the Australian Democrats, and various other political and community organisations.

Estimates of the number of people taking part varied widely, with organisers claiming more than 500,000. Police and media estimates suggested that about 250,000 people took part in capital city rallies. Tens of Thousands of people also attended hundreds of meetings in rural and regional towns across Australia.

Government ministers such as John Howard and Industrial Relations Minister Kevin Andrews said they would ignore the protests. Howard said that in a year's time the legislation would be accepted. Andrews described the ACTU campaign as "irresponsible and hysterical." The Australian Chamber of Commerce and Industry said that "more than 95 per cent of workers ignored the call-out to join the protest."

Commonwealth Public Servants were prohibited from attending with one report saying "The Department of Employment and Workplace Relations has just advised agencies that [the national day of community protest] is a form of industrial action and as such access to leave and flex leave should not be given to employees wishing to attend."

In Melbourne, the rally, at Federation Square, was addressed by the Premier of Victoria, Steve Bracks, the ACTU President, Sharan Burrow, and the ACTU Secretary, Greg Combet. In Brisbane, the Premier of Queensland Peter Beattie and federal Labor Party Leader Kim Beazley addressed the rally, with Beazley promising to repeal the legislation if Labor wins the election expected in 2007.

Combet, who was the main organiser of the union movement's resistance to the government's legislation, told the Melbourne rally that "working people will not be denied a central place in Australia's future. Working families built this country. They fought and died for it. They do not deserve to have their rights at work taken away."

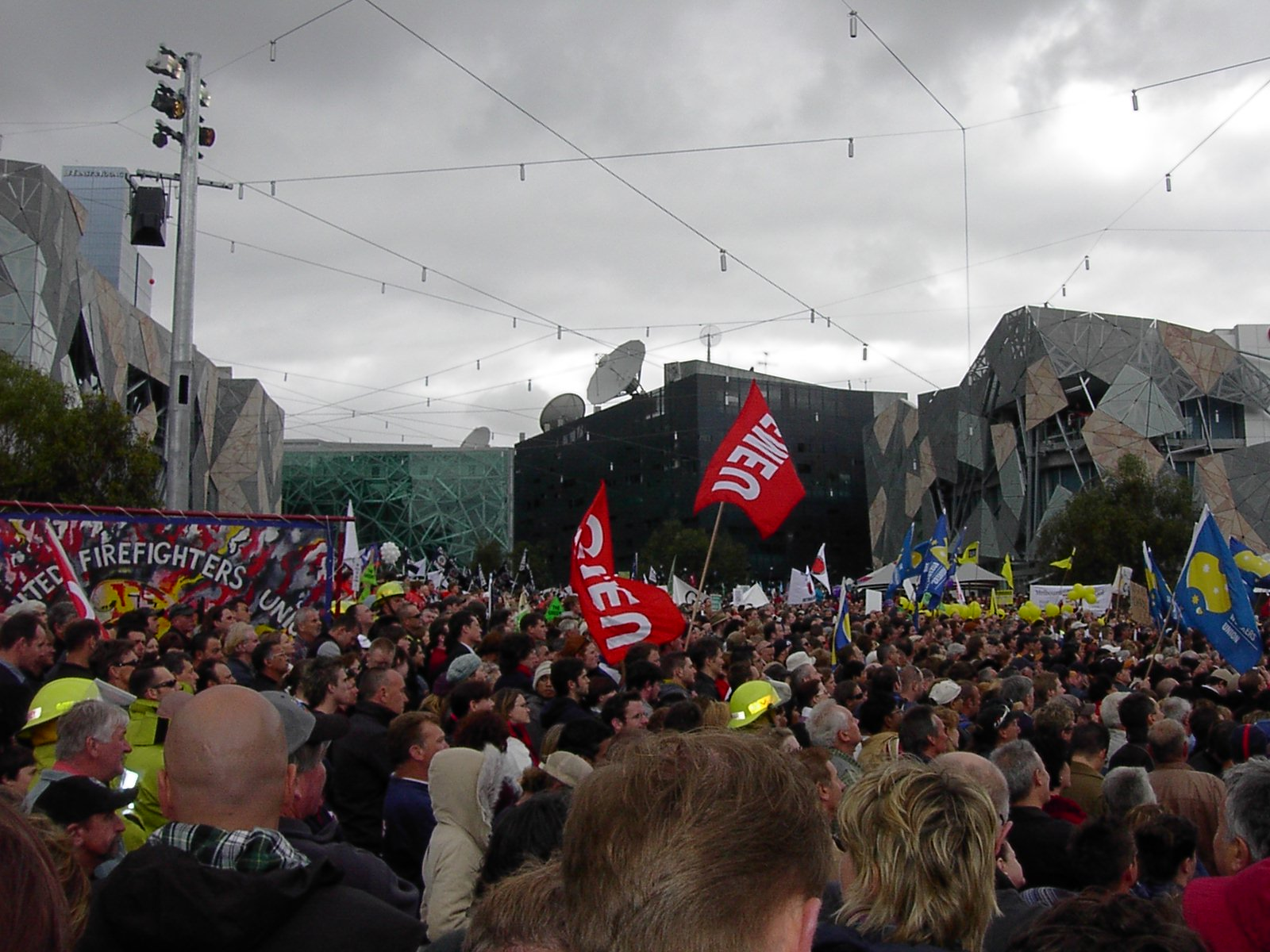
Part of the crowd at Federation Square. The red flags are the banners of the Construction, Forestry, Mining and Energy Union (CFMEU)

Combet said the expected passage of the industrial relations bills through the Australian Senate in the next few weeks would not mark the defeat of the unions' campaign. "Rather, it will signal the start of a determined, relentless effort to overturn these laws and put in their place decent rights for the working people of this country," he said.

Combet said that he and other union officials would "not be intimidated" by the prospect of the fines and imprisonment threatened in the legislation if officials break the new laws. "Unions must continue to stand up for people," he said. "As a union leader let me make this clear. I will not pay a $33,000 fine for asking for people to be treated fairly." This line drew an enormous cheer from the crowd.

"We must be disciplined and responsible," Combet said. "There is no place for foolhardy or reckless behaviour. But we must also be firm in our resolve to stand up for people. It is true that it will take time for some people to be affected by the laws. But the rights of every person will be diminished. And for many the change will come quickly – particularly the most vulnerable."

Organisers estimated the Melbourne crowd at 245,000 protesters. Police estimated the crowd at 150,000. Organisers claimed that 45,000 people marched in Sydney, while the Sydney Morning Herald put the number at 30,000. Although Sydney is bigger than Melbourne, protest crowds are usually bigger in the southern city. Up to 120,000 people across New South Wales took part in 227 separate stopwork meetings, linked by a statewide video hook-up.

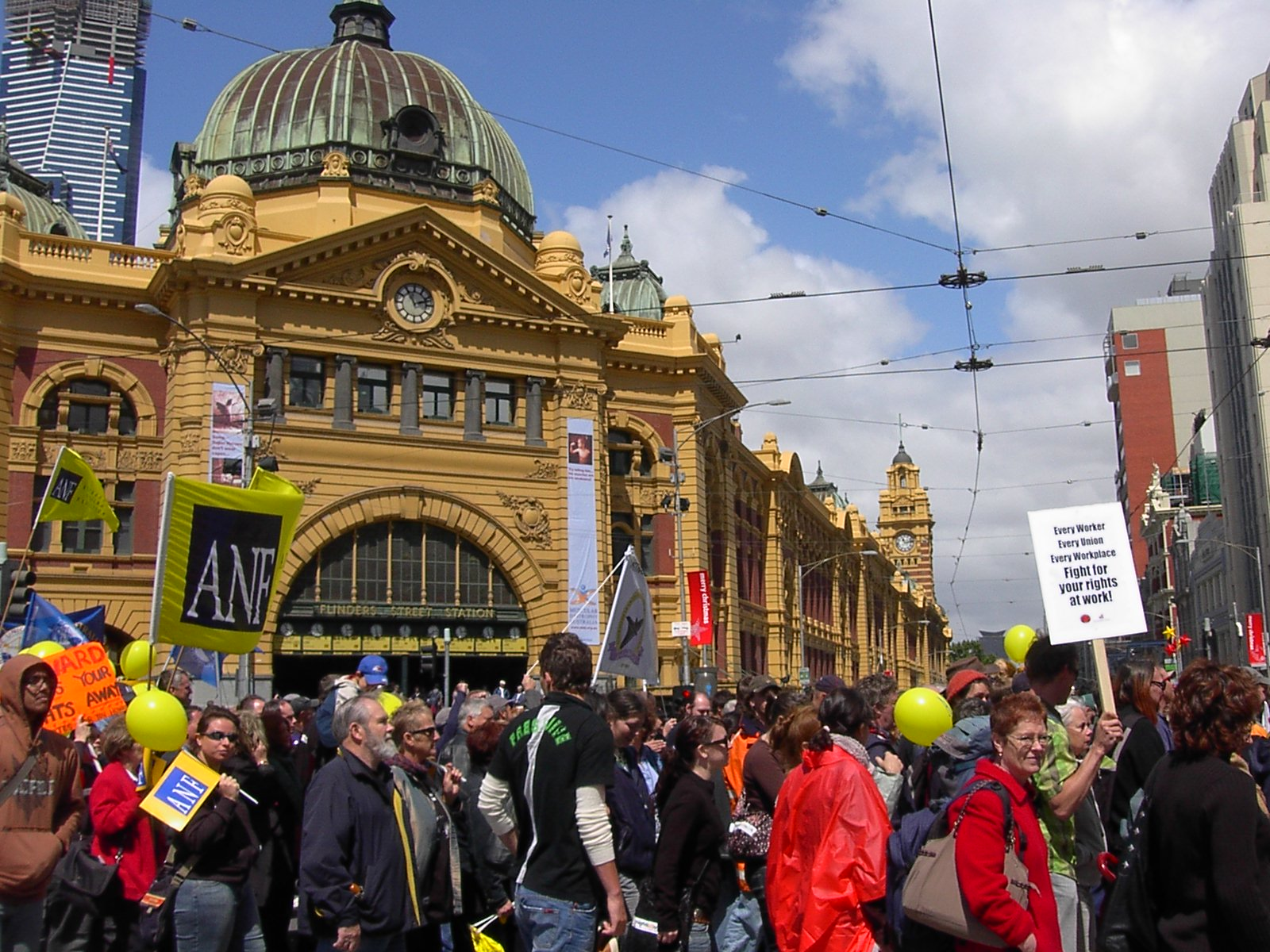
Part of the crowd marching up Swanston Street, Melbourne, past Flinders Street station

Organisers claimed 40,000 marchers in Adelaide, 30,000 in Perth, 25,000 in Brisbane, 6,000 in Hobart, 5,000 in Canberra and 3,000 in Darwin. Rallies were held in about 300 cities and towns.

The day of protest was largely peaceful, but in Sydney more than 3,000 transport workers voted to block the M4, a major arterial route into the city, disrupting traffic. More than 15 freight trucks blocked traffic in both directions on the M4, while seven trucks stopped traffic at the entrance to the M4 from the Homebush Bay overpass. Thousands of protesters sat on the road, chanting and waving placards. The blockage lasted about half an hour. In most places there was effective co-operation between the organisers and police.

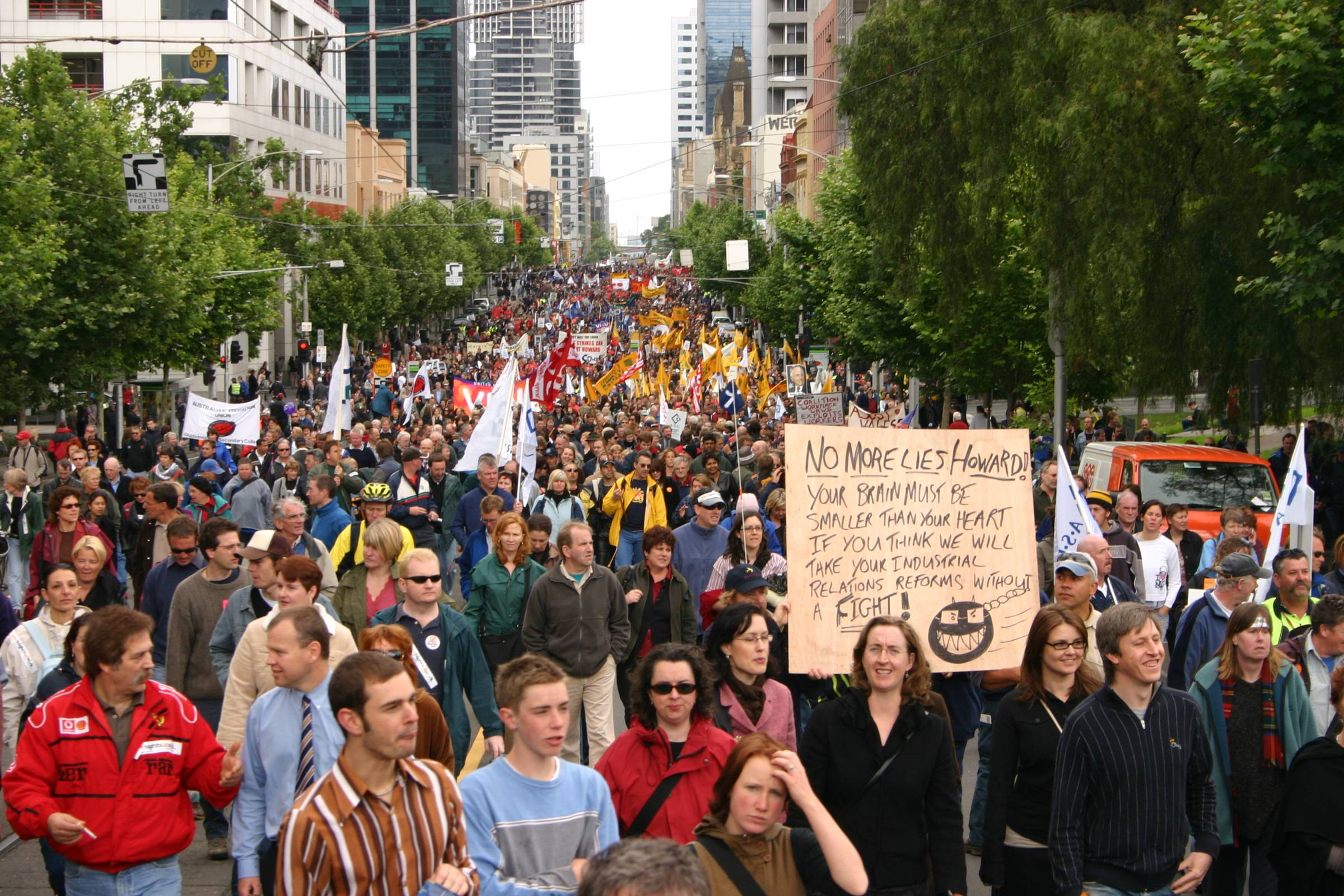
A view of the rally in La Trobe Street, Melbourne, giving an indication of the size of the crowd

Unions warned that the day of protest was only the start of a campaign which would continue until the next election. Bill Shorten, national secretary of the Australian Workers' Union, said: "The strategy is to fight, to fight in the workplace, to fight in the community, to fight in the media and to get rid of the Howard government."

== Comparisons ==
Organisers and some media described the 15 November rallies as the largest ever held in Australia. This claim is frequently made. It was also made about the Vietnam Moratorium demonstrations in 1970, the rallies against uranium mining in the late 1970s, rallies against the 2003 Iraq War and, in Melbourne, about the 1992 rally against the Kennett government's industrial relations legislation. In each case organisers estimated the crowd numbers at 100,000 or more, while police estimates were considerably lower. It is unlikely that any of these rallies were as large as the 15 November rally in Melbourne, which even the police estimated at 150,000 and early reports from Skynews based on aerial shots showing packed Melbourne city streets estimated as 175,000.
