= WorkChoices =

Former Australian industrial relations law

Workplace Relations Amendment (Work Choices) Act 2005
- Coat of Arms of Australia

Parliament of Australia
- Long title: An Act to amend the law relating to workplace relations, and for related purposes
- Enacted by: Parliament of Australia
- Status: Repealed

WorkChoices was the name given to changes made to the federal industrial relations laws in Australia by the Howard government in 2005, being amendments to the Workplace Relations Act 1996 by the Workplace Relations Amendment (Work Choices) Act 2005, sometimes referred to as the Workplace Relations Amendment Act 2005, that came into effect on 27 March 2006.

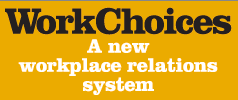
"WorkChoices: A new workplace relations system": WorkChoices logo from the Federal Government's advertising campaign.

In May 2005, Prime Minister John Howard informed the Australian House of Representatives that the federal government intended to reform Australian industrial relations laws by introducing a unified national system. WorkChoices was ostensibly designed to improve employment levels and national economic performance by dispensing with unfair dismissal laws for companies under a certain size, removing the "no disadvantage test" which had sought to ensure workers were not left disadvantaged by changes in legislation, thereby promoting individual efficiency and requiring workers to submit their certified agreements directly to the Workplace Authority rather than going through the Australian Industrial Relations Commission. It also made adjustments to a workforce's ability to legally go on strike, enabling workers to bargain for conditions without collectivised representation, and significantly restricting trade union activity.

The passing and implementation of the new laws was strongly opposed by the left side of politics, particularly the trade union movement. It was argued that the laws stripped away basic employee rights and were fundamentally unfair. The Australian Council of Trade Unions (ACTU), the peak association for Australian trade unions, consistently ran television advertisements attacking the new laws and launching its "Your Rights at Work" campaign opposing the changes. The campaign involved mass rallies and marches, television and radio advertisements, judicial action, and e-activism. The week of action culminated on 1 July 2005 with a "SkyChannel" meeting of union delegates and members organised by Unions NSW. The meeting was followed by a large rally in Sydney and events in regional areas. Individual state governments also opposed the changes. For example, the Victorian Government introduced the Victorian Workplace Rights Advocate as a form of political resistance to the changes.

WorkChoices was a major issue in the 2007 federal election, with the Australian Labor Party (ALP) led by Kevin Rudd vowing to abolish it. Labor won government at the 2007 election and repealed the whole of the WorkChoices legislation and replaced it with the Fair Work Act 2009.

== WorkChoices changes ==
WorkChoices made a number of significant changes to the Workplace Relations Act 1996, including:

- formation of a single national industrial relations system in relation to incorporated corporations, to replace the separate State and federal systems.
- establishment of the Australian Fair Pay Commission to determine minimum wages in place of National Wage Cases at the Australian Industrial Relations Commission (AIRC).
- streamlined the making of Certified Agreements and Australian workplace agreements, including increasing the maximum life of agreements from three years to five years.
- reduction in the number of allowable matters, which could be covered by awards.
- creation of five minimum workplace conditions.
- exemption of companies with fewer than 101 employees from unfair dismissal laws.
- exemption of all companies from unfair dismissal laws, where a dismissal is for a bona fide operational reason.
- increased restrictions on allowable industrial action.
- mandated secret ballots for industrial action.
- outlawed pattern bargaining and industry-wide industrial action.

== Scope of the system ==
Before the commencement of WorkChoices the Commonwealth relied on the conciliation and arbitration power (section 51(xxxv) of the Constitution) which provides that the Commonwealth may make laws with respect to "conciliation and arbitration for the prevention and settlement of industrial disputes extending beyond the limits of any one State".

The Howard government sought to bring as many employees under WorkChoices as was within its constitutional powers. It relied on the corporations power (Section 51(xx) of the Constitution of Australia) extending its coverage to an estimated 85% of Australian employees. All employees of "constitutional corporations" (i.e. trading, financial, and foreign corporations) became covered by the WorkChoices system. Other constitutional powers used by the federal government to extend the scope of the legislation included the territories power to cover the Australian territories, including the external territories of the Christmas and Cocos Islands, the external affairs power, the interstate and overseas trade and commerce power, and the powers of the Commonwealth to legislate for its own employees. Victoria had voluntarily referred its industrial relations powers to the Commonwealth in 1996, under section 51(xxxvii) of the Constitution.

While one of the purposes of these changes was to provide a single national industrial relations system, in practice, each of the States' systems (except Victoria and the territories) remained in force. State industrial relations systems continued to apply to employers that were not covered by federal agreements (Australian workplace agreements or collective agreements), bound to a federal award, or were not incorporated and trading, financial or foreign organisations. Employers that remained in the State systems included sole traders, partnerships, incorporated associations which are not "trading and financial corporations" and state government bodies.

Court decisions may be required to establish whether an organisation falls under this definition; areas of contention include local government and incorporated associations that undertake some trading activities, such as not-for-profit organisations. There have been several test cases in state and federal jurisdictions, including Bysterveld v Shire of Cue and Bankstown Handicapped Children's Centre Association Inc v Hillman. The general principles established by this case and similar cases since the introduction of WorkChoices were that the types of activities carried out by an individual organisation and the extent and value of these activities must be assessed on a case-by-case basis to determine whether the activities are considered substantially "trading and financial".

== Significant changes ==
=== Changing dismissal protection laws for most employees ===
WorkChoices contained provisions relating to both unfair dismissal and unlawful termination, which are separate matters. The Australian Industrial Relations Commission (AIRC) retained some of its role in hearing unfair dismissal and unlawful termination cases, but increased the emphasis on mediation and conciliation. It also reduced the timeframe within which employees were able to lodge such claims; claims had to be lodged within 21 days from the date of termination. Employees could apply for an extension of this timeframe, but a review of published decisions shows that extensions were infrequently granted. Fees applied for applications, at one time $55.70.

Both unfair dismissal and unlawful termination claims went through an initial hearing and compulsory conciliation conference at the AIRC. Only when the conciliation was unsuccessful and a conciliation certificate issued could the claim proceed to the next step. For unfair dismissal claims, the claim proceeded to arbitration by the AIRC, where a Member of the Commission could issue a binding decision. For unlawful termination claims, the claim proceeded to a court with appropriate jurisdiction such as the Federal Court or the Industrial Division of the Federal Magistrates Court.

Prior to WorkChoices, unfair dismissal protections existed in awards or through state industrial relation commissions. The changes to dismissal laws was part of WorkChoices which reduced the protections of previous unfair dismissal laws, which were introduced at a federal level by the Labor government of Paul Keating in 1993. The arguments for these changes related to creating jobs by removing the burden on business of dismissing unsuitable employees. Arguments against the changes included the lack of job security for employees.

WorkChoices introduced several restrictions on who was able to lodge an unfair dismissal claim with the AIRC. Unfair dismissal was defined by the Workplace Relations Act 1996 (the Act) as dismissal which is "harsh, unjust or unreasonable." Employees had to be working for a business that had more than 100 employees, and served a qualifying period of 6 months to claim unfair dismissal. Other reasons that excluded an employee from taking unfair dismissal action included where an employee was employed on a seasonal basis or on a contract of employment for a specified period or task, employed on a probationary period that was reasonable and determined in advance, a short-term casual employee, a trainee engaged for a specific period, or an employee not employed under an award or workplace agreement and earning more than $101,300 per year.

Significantly, the Act also excluded employees who were dismissed for "genuine operational reasons or reasons including genuine operational reasons". "Genuine operational reasons" were defined in the Act as "reasons of an economic, technological, structural or similar nature." Interpretation of this clause by the AIRC had created precedent for a broad application of this section of the Act. In Carter v Village Cinemas, the Full Bench of the AIRC decided upon appeal that an operational reason need only be a reason for dismissal, not the sole or dominant reason for dismissal. In another significant decision, Andrew Cruickshank v Priceline Pty Ltd, Mr Cruickshank was employed at Priceline on a package of $101,150. He was terminated and Priceline subsequently hired a new employee in the same position on a package of $65,000–$75,000. Priceline claimed, successfully, that they had not breached the unfair dismissal provisions of the Act, as the dismissal saved the business money, therefore was for a reason including a genuine operational reason.

Unlawful termination encompassed several parts; notice of termination, Centrelink notification, and prohibited reasons. Under Section 661 of the Act, employees, other than excluded employees (including casual employees with less than 12 months' regular ongoing service, apprentices) were required to be given a specified period of notice of termination or payment in lieu of this notice. Where this was not provided to an employee, an unlawful termination application could have been lodged. In certain circumstances where a business terminates 15 or more employees, the business needed to give written notice to a body prescribed by the Workplace Relations Regulations 2006, currently Centrelink.

Prohibited reasons for termination included discriminatory reasons such as age, race, national extraction, political opinion, sex, sexual preference, religion, marital status, disability, pregnancy and family responsibilities; refusal to sign an Australian workplace agreement (AWA) (however, it was not prohibited to deny employment to a new employee who refuses to sign an AWA); being involved in proceedings against an employer for alleged breach of the law; membership or non-membership of a union or participation in union activities; and absence from work due to illness or injury, parental leave or emergency management activities. Unlike unfair dismissal provisions, there were no restrictions on employees who can lodge unlawful termination claims for prohibited reasons.

=== Removing the "No Disadvantage Test" for agreements ===
Prior to the WorkChoices coming into force, certified agreements, subsequently called Collective Agreements (CAs) and individual Australian workplace agreements (AWAs), had to pass a No Disadvantage Test. This test compared a proposed agreement to an underpinning and relevant award that had or should have covered employees up until the proposal for an agreement. The No Disadvantage Test weighed the benefits of the award against the proposed agreement to ensure that, overall, employees were no worse off.

WorkChoices required that employers provide employees with five minimum entitlements, which covered maximum ordinary working hours, annual leave, parental leave, personal/carer's leave and minimum pay scales. These five minimum entitlements were referred to as the Australian Fair Pay and Conditions Standard. However, the standard did not have any bearing on agreements that were certified prior to the commencement of WorkChoices: Notional Agreements Preserving State Awards (NAPSAs) if their conditions were more generous than what is provided for under the standard, those conditions will continue to apply.

Those who supported the scrapping of the No Disadvantage Test claimed that it was too complex and argued that its removal would create more opportunities for unemployed people to be offered a job. The example of "Billy" was used in material supporting the Government's position. Unions and other groups opposed to WorkChoices claimed that Billy was a perfect example of why the new laws were unfair and would lead to bosses exploiting their workers.

In response to widespread criticism, the government introduced a fairness test to replace the standard. However, the legislation was not retrospective and so did not apply to agreements created between the inception of the original WorkChoices legislation on 27 March 2006 and when the Fairness Test became operative on 7 May 2007.

=== Streamlined process for agreement certification ===
Previously, certified agreements, which were collective agreements about employment entitlements and obligations, made by an employer directly with employees or with unions, had to be lodged and certified in the Australian Industrial Relations Commission (AIRC).

The new legislated changes transferred responsibility for overseeing the agreement certification process to the Workplace Authority, which had some of its other powers of investigation transferred to the Workplace Ombudsman. Now instead of appearing before a Commissioner at the AIRC, parties to a collective agreement were only required to lodge the agreement with the Workplace Authority.

This new process was criticised by those opposed to WorkChoices as they believed that it would give unions less opportunity to scrutinise and intervene where they believed an agreement had been unfairly drafted. However, the government stated in response that the intention of this part of the Act was to improve the turn-around time for agreement certification. In addition, the newly amended Act provided for substantial penalties upon employers, employees and unions where a collective agreement did not comply with the new regulations or included prohibited content.

=== Office of the Employment Advocate survey ===
The Office of the Employment Advocate, now known as the Workplace Authority, conducted a survey ending in September 2006 which showed the following results with respect to 'protected' conditions lost in WorkChoices legislation: of all AWAs sampled, 88 per cent abolished or 'modified' overtime rates; 89 per cent of AWAs either abolished or 'modified' shiftwork loading; 91 per cent abolished or 'modified' monetary allowances; 85 per cent abolished or 'modified incentive payments; 82 per cent abolished or 'modified' public holiday payments; and 83 per cent abolished or 'modified' rest breaks. In each of these cases conditions were more often abolished than modified, and all modifications represented decreases in conditions. Lastly, though 66 per cent of AWAs resulted in wage increases, 52 per cent of these increases were unquantified or not guaranteed.

== Passage into law ==
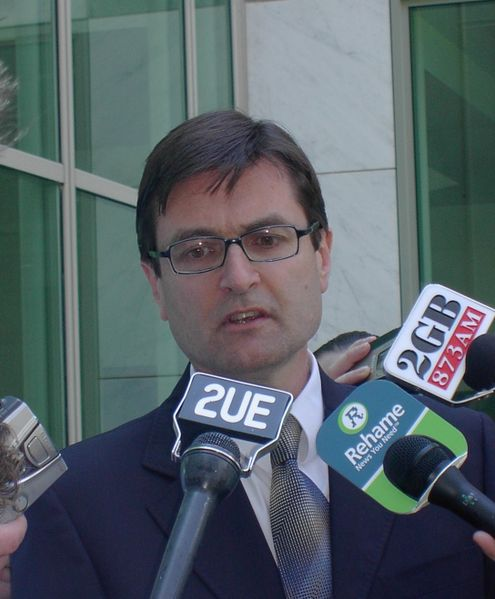
Greg Combet, Secretary of the Australian Council of Trade Unions, tells a media conference on 2 November 2005 that "the Australian labour movement will overturn this legislation, no matter how long it takes"

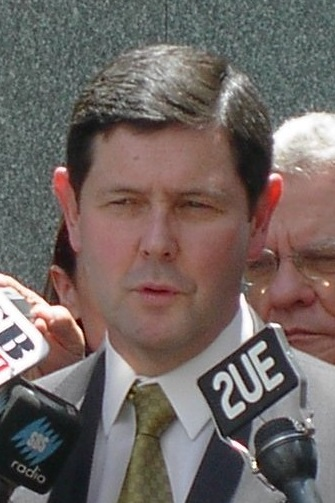
The then Minister for Employment and Workplace Relations, Kevin Andrews, who introduced the Australian industrial relations legislation, speaking at a press conference on 8 November 2005

The Workplace Relations Amendment (WorkChoices) Bill 2005 (Cth) was introduced into the Australian House of Representatives on 2 November 2005 by the Minister for Employment and Workplace Relations, Kevin Andrews. The Australian Labor Party claimed it was not provided with enough copies of the Bill when it entered the House and mounted a campaign against the Bill in the House throughout the day. During Question Time, Opposition members continually interjected while Government members were speaking, leading the Speaker (and later the Deputy Speaker) to remove 11 of them.

On the same day, the Senate referred the Bill to its Employment, Workplace Relations and Education Committee. The committee allowed five days for submissions to be made to the committee, with the closing date being 9 November 2005. Five days of hearings were scheduled to be held at Parliament House in Canberra commencing 14 November with the committee reporting to the Senate on 22 November. The decision to have a rather short inquiry was criticised by Labor, who claimed that it was an attempt by the Government to avoid proper scrutiny of the Bill. By 9 November, the Senate committee had received more than 4,500 submissions, of which only 173 were published on its website. The committee did not individually acknowledge and publish all submissions, due to the large number of submissions, at least partially resulting from the Australian Council of Trade Unions (ACTU) campaign against WorkChoices, which included setting up a form on its website by which people could make a submission.

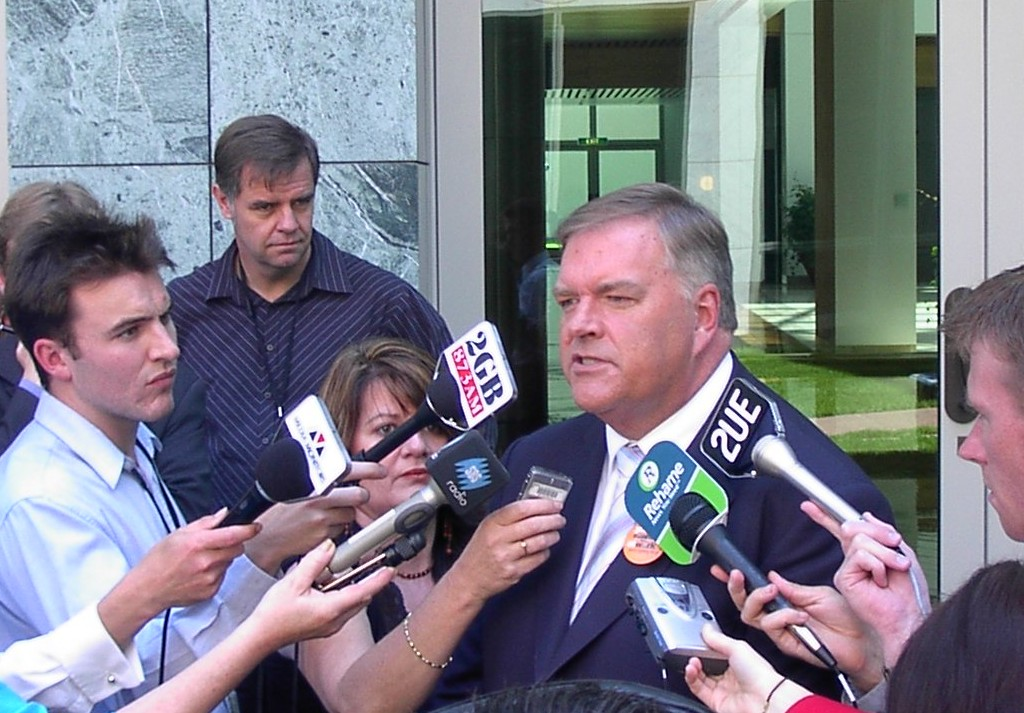
Kim Beazley in November 2005 declaring Labor will "oppose the Howard government's industrial relations legislation in every respect, at every stage until the next election"

The Bill passed through the House of Representatives on 10 November and was introduced into the Senate later that day by Special Minister of State, Senator Eric Abetz.

On 14 November the Senate Inquiry began its five-day hearing—in which only a fraction of the submissions were heard—with the submissions of State and Territory Industrial Relations Ministers and representatives. The representatives were each allowed only seven minutes to address the Inquiry, during which they criticised the package as being unconstitutional and undermining the rights and conditions of workers. The Bill was passed, with amendments, by the Senate, by a vote of 35–33 on 2 December 2005.

The Bill received Royal Assent on 14 December and the parts concerning the Australian Fair Pay Commission, wages for school based trainees and apprentices, and redundancy pay for small employers came into force immediately from that date.

The Minister for Employment and Workplace Relations released the first set of regulations for the Bill on 17 March 2006 and following that the complete Act was proclaimed by Australia's Governor-General Michael Jeffery. The Act commenced on 27 March 2006.

In July 2007, a biography of John Howard said he pushed the WorkChoices legislation through in 2006 so it would not be announced in an election year, and that several cabinet ministers expressed concerns that the legislation would disadvantage too many workers.

== Campaigns and counter-campaigns ==
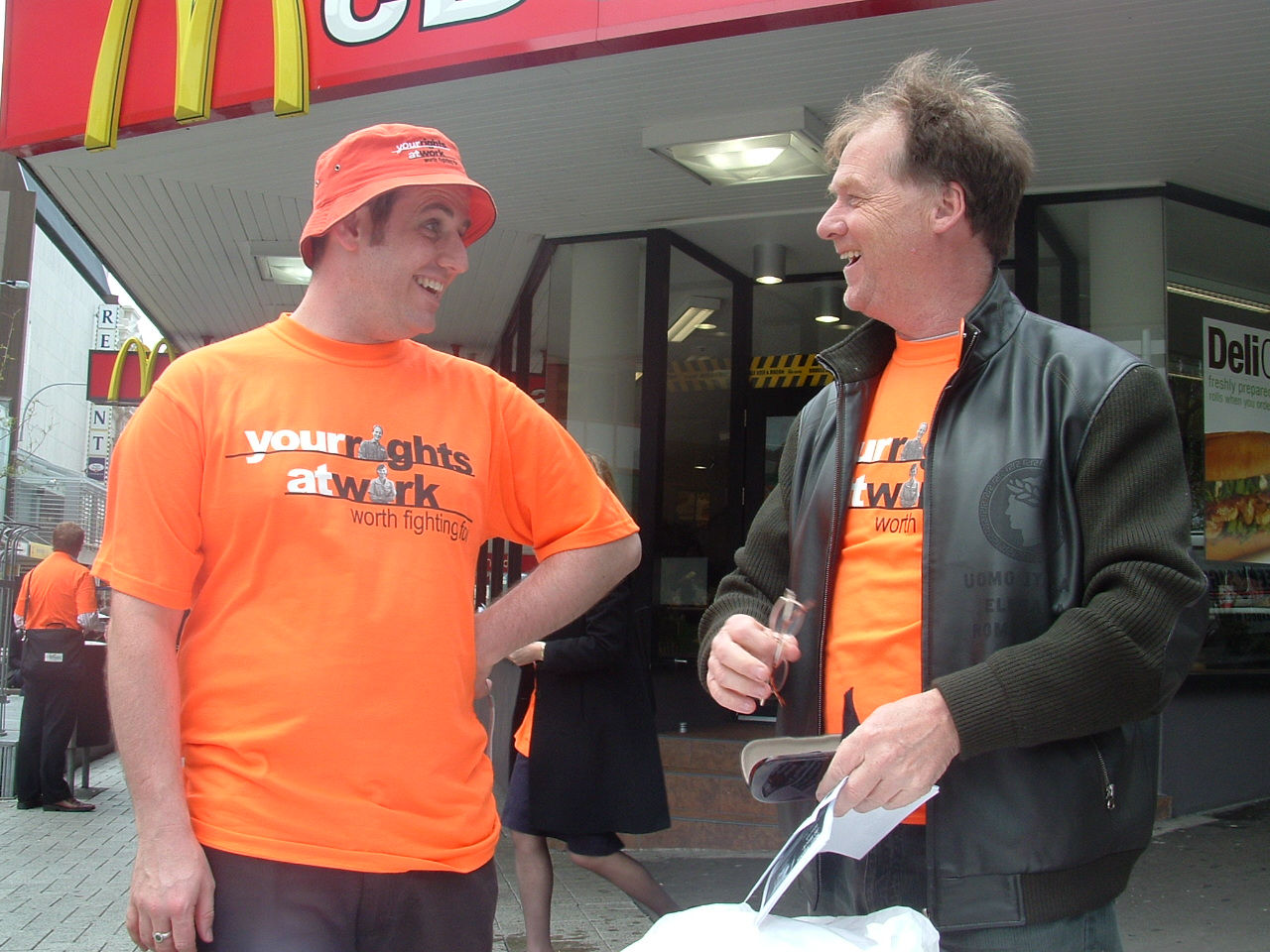
"Your Rights at Work" is the name of a campaign launched by the Australian labour movement since the introduction of WorkChoices, resulting in widespread coverage through mass protest rallies.

=== High Court challenge ===
The ACTU's media campaign triggered a government counter-campaign promoting the reforms. Stage one of the government campaign preceded the release of the legislation and cost approximately $46 million, including advertisements from both the government and the Business Council of Australia, information booklets and a hotline. Government polling of the period August 2005 to February 2006, not released until March 2008, revealed that the government's advertising campaign failed to make workers less apprehensive about WorkChoices.

The ALP, minor parties and the ACTU attacked the advertising campaign, with ACTU President Sharan Burrow describing the advertisements as deceitful party-political advertising funded through taxes. The Government argued that such expenditure is normal procedure when introducing radical change, citing the example of the GST advertising. However, that advertising was severely criticised at the time, and for the same reasons. The expenditure was challenged in the High Court of Australia by the ALP and the ACTU, in Combet v Commonwealth, on the grounds that the expenditure was not approved by Parliament. On 29 September 2005 the High Court rejected this argument in a majority decision.

=== National days of protest ===
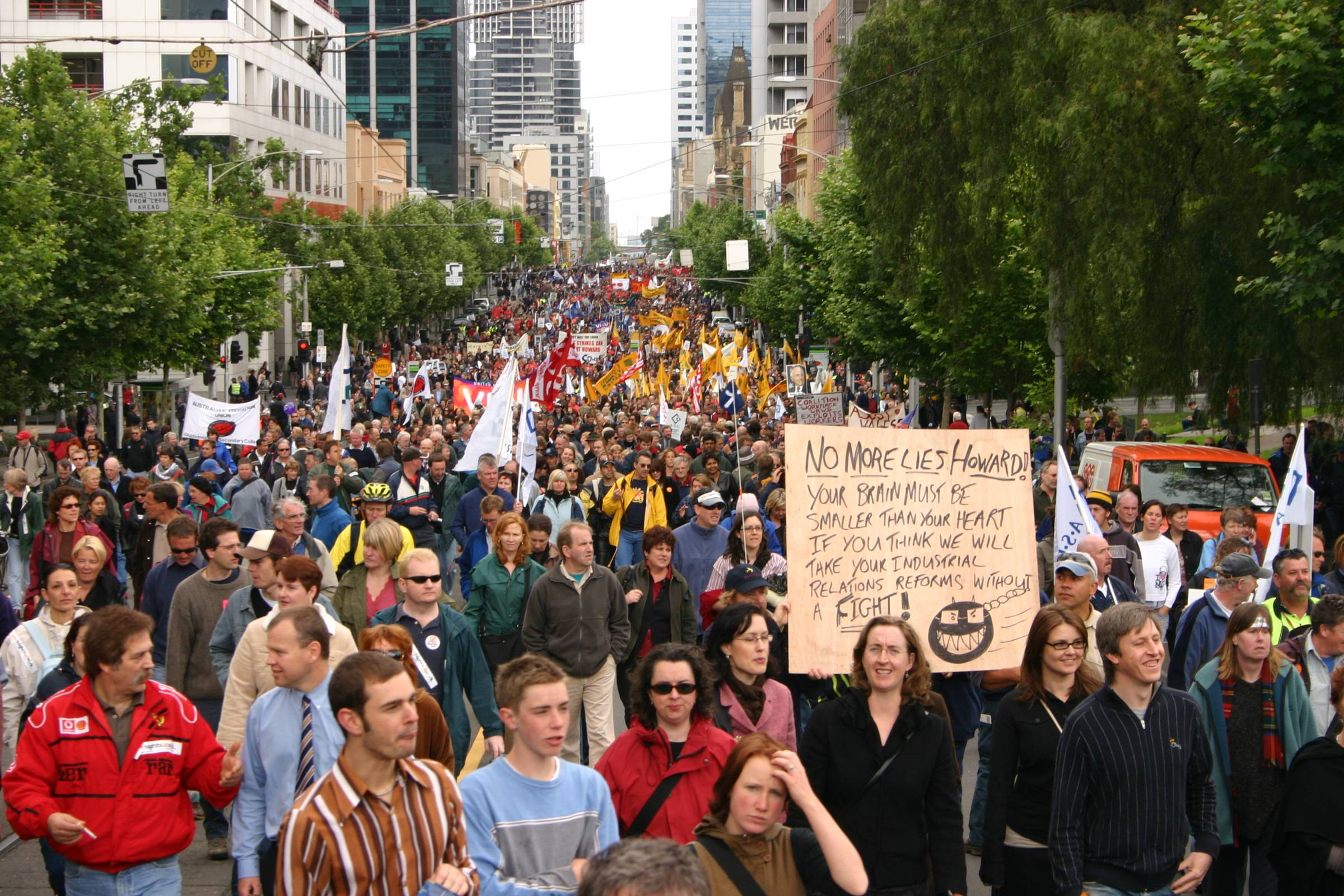
A view of a rally on 15 November 2005 in La Trobe Street, Melbourne, giving an indication of the size of the crowd

On 15 November 2005, the ACTU organised a national day of protest, during which the ACTU estimated 546,000 people took part in marches and protests in Australia's state capitals and other cities. The rallies were addressed by Labor State Premiers. Other notable Australians, including former Labor Prime Minister Bob Hawke, also spoke in opposition to the industrial relations changes.

A second national day of protest was held across Australia on 30 November 2006 with rallies or meetings in about 300 sites nationwide. At the MCG the entertainment included Jimmy Barnes and the crowd was addressed by such speakers as the leader of the opposition Kim Beazley. Estimates for the Melbourne crowd ranged from 45,000 to 65,000 people at the MCG and the march to Federation Square. In other cities, an estimated 40,000 people attended a similar rally in Sydney, 20,000 in Brisbane, 7,000 in Adelaide, 3,000 in Perth, 2,000 in Darwin, and 1,000 in Canberra.

=== Online campaigns ===
As part of its campaign against WorkChoices, the ACTU set up the "Your Rights at Work" campaign website, with more than 170,000 people signing up to receive updates about the campaign and the e-list also being part of the online campaign actions. One of the most well-supported campaigns was "Take a Stand Barnaby!", petitioning National Party of Australia Senator Barnaby Joyce to act on his concerns about WorkChoices and vote against them in the Senate in November 2005. Ultimately unsuccessful, the petition received 85,189 signatures, thought by the ACTU to be a record for an Australian online petition at that time.

Other internet activism campaigns undertaken by the Rights at Work website supporters included raising $50,000 in five working days to erect a billboard on Melbourne's Tullamarine Freeway raising awareness of WorkChoices. The online campaigns also targeted employers, like Darrell Lea CEO John Tolmie. In April, Mr Tolmie bowed to pressure and halted plans to shift his workforce onto AWA individual contracts after 10,000 Rights at Work supporters emailed him asking him to reconsider.

== High Court challenge ==
At the commencement of the WorkChoices reforms every state and territory of Australia had a Labor government. The States lodged a challenge to the Constitutional validity of WorkChoices in the High Court of Australia. Various union groups also lodged their own challenge in the High Court. The High Court heard arguments between 4 May 2006 and 11 May 2006. On 14 November 2006 the High Court, by a 5 to 2 majority, rejected the challenge, upholding the Government's use of the constitutional corporations power as a constitutionally valid basis for the WorkChoices reforms.

== Political reactions and consequences ==
When it was tabled in the Parliament, there was significant concerns from civil libertarians and the Opposition that the Bill was passed far too quickly for those voting on it to actually read the document closely, and that insufficient physical copies of the bill had been given to the Opposition to read before a vote was held.

Employer associations such as the Business Council of Australia and the Australian Chamber of Commerce and Industry had indicated they supported WorkChoices at the time, figures that ran counter to the 50 per cent of employers cited in a 2007 AC Nielsen poll as opposing the measures. The Australian labour movement, represented by the Australian Council of Trade Unions, ran a very effective media campaign attacking the proposed changes, and alternate models were proposed by the centre-left Australian Labor Party (ALP), who won the subsequent election in a landslide. The Liberal (center-right) Government at that time used federal funds to produce and air an advertising campaign promoting WorkChoices, a decision that which was criticised by the federal opposition and challenged in the High Court. In addition, the state governments of Australia (all of which were Labor at the time) used the High Court to challenge the legality of the Commonwealth using the Corporations power to sidestep the usual parliamentary oversight and implement WorkChoices, but were ruled against.

WorkChoices was not a 2004 Liberal party election policy. However, following the 2004 federal election, the Liberal–National coalition held a majority in both houses of parliament, and amendments were introduced into the House of Representatives on 2 November 2005. A senate inquiry was held into the Bill from 14 November 2005 to 22 November 2005. The length of this was criticised by the Opposition as being too short. A survey by the Workplace Authority found that although most AWAs (Australian workplace agreement) removed some leave loadings, this was also accompanied by a wage rise in most cases. WorkChoices was passed by the Senate on 2 December 2005. The primary changes came into effect on 27 March 2006.

In December 2005, the federal ALP caucus formed an Industrial Relations Taskforce in order to investigate the adverse effects of the legislation, chaired by Brendan O'Connor, with special emphasis on the impact on regional and rural communities, women and young people. During 2006, the Taskforce traveled to every state and territory in Australia, convening meetings with individuals, employers, church and community groups and trade unions, collecting testimony in order to inform federal Labor's policy response and to publicise instances of actual exploitation. An interim report, "WorkChoices: A Race to the Bottom" was launched by Opposition Leader Kim Beazley at Parliament House, Canberra on 20 June 2006, and widely distributed.

WorkChoices was a prominent issue in the defeat of the centre-right Howard Liberal government at the 2007 federal election. The centre-left Rudd Labor government dismantled the legislation in 2008, declaring it "dead".

== "WorkChoices" brand discarded ==
A spoof "15-dollar" note issued by unions criticising Joe Hockey's role as the main spokesperson on the WorkChoices policy during the 2007 election campaign

The Australian Government stopped using the name "WorkChoices" to describe its industrial relations changes on 17 May 2007. Workplace Relations Minister Joe Hockey said the brand had to be dropped due to the union and community campaign against the WorkChoices laws. "It has resonated because it has been the most sophisticated and articulate political campaign in the history of this country." The ACTU countered that the name may have changed but the laws were the same. The Government did not rename the brand, but did launch a new advertising campaign that did not refer specifically to WorkChoices. This gave rise to the jibe from critics and commentators alike that the policy was one that dare not speak its name, an allusion to the euphemism coined by Lord Alfred Douglas for homosexuality. Another notable curiosity was the continuation of the website.

== Legacy ==
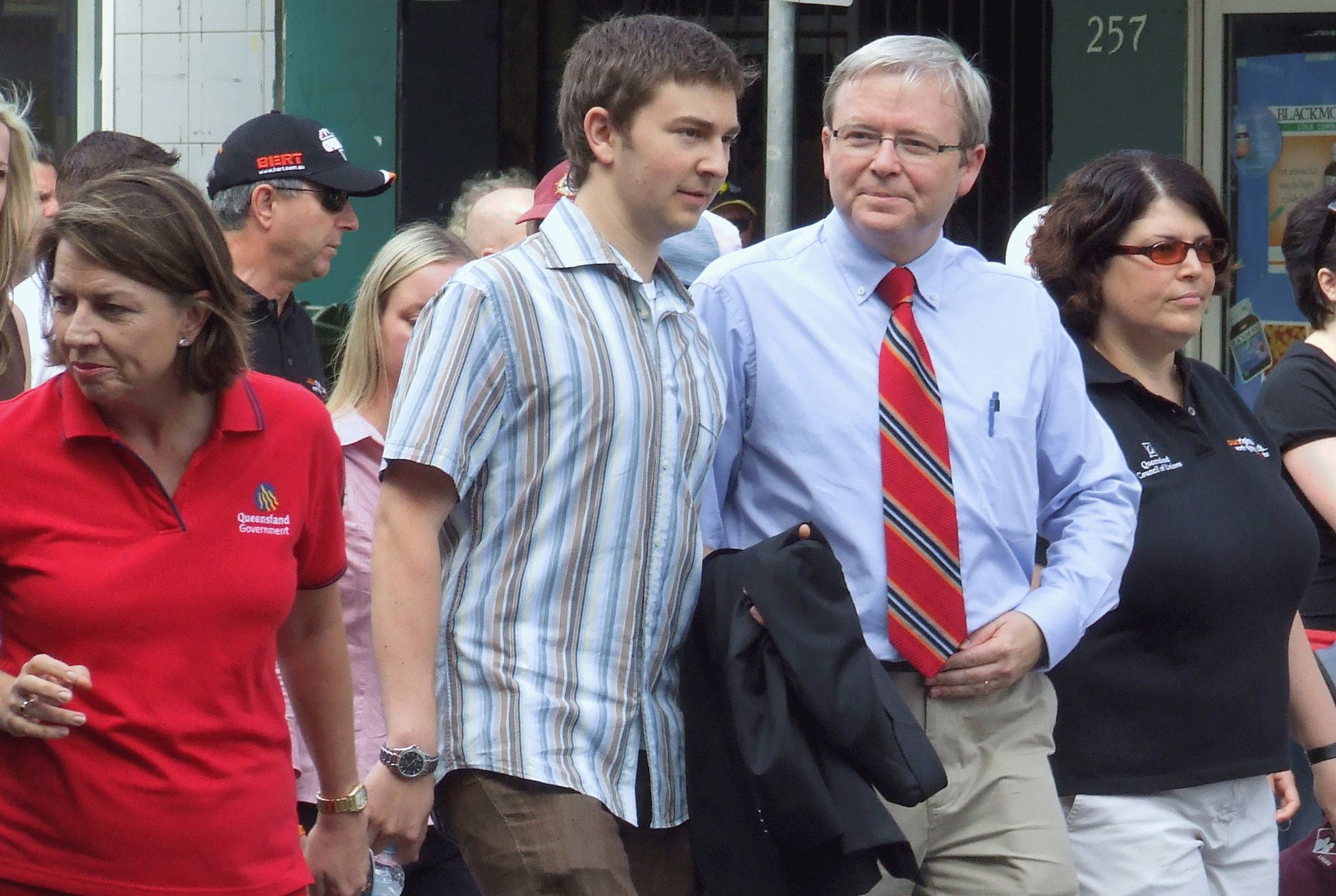
Kevin Rudd (second from right) campaigning against WorkChoices at Labour Day 2007

Kevin Rudd took over the Australian Labor Party leadership on 4 December 2006, and in the process reaffirming his opposition to WorkChoices. As Labor won government at the 2007 federal election, it retained a federal rather than states-based system. Additionally, it planned to phase out Australian workplace agreements (AWAs) over a period of years with a preference of collective agreements and awards with an exclusion to those earning over $100,000. Unfair dismissal laws were to be restored to all businesses; however, employees joining companies with under 15 employees will be placed under a twelve-month probationary period. Restrictive right of entry rules in to workplaces for unions introduced under WorkChoices were to remain and secret ballots (rather than open ballots) to decide on carrying out strikes were to continue, which would become banned except during periods of collective bargaining. The dismantling of the group of industrial relations bodies created by the government would also occur, and in their place a service known as Fair Work Australia would be created.

Rudd used part of the 2007 election debate to argue that the Liberal Party was being influenced by the H. R. Nicholls Society to make further reforms to industrial relations, citing Nick Minchin's attendance to last year's H. R. Nicholls Society conference, where he told the audience that the Coalition knew its reform to WorkChoices were not popular but the process of change must continue, and that "there is still a long way to go ... awards, the IR commission, all the rest of it". The Australian Labor Party stated that "We know the HR Nicholls society supports the abolition of awards, supports the abolition of the minimum wage, supports the abolition of the independent umpire, the Industrial Relations Commission".

In 2007, the society criticised the WorkChoices legislation for creating even more regulation. The society admonished the WorkChoices model particularly for its length and the amount of red tape, claiming it was "all about regulation" and comparing it to the "old Soviet system of command and control", as well as on federalist grounds saying "This attempt on his part to diminish the role of the states, to concentrate all power in Canberra, is very much to Australia's detriment". Society President Ray Evans stated that in creating WorkChoices "John Howard has assumed an omnipotence that Labor will inherit and to which no mortal should aspire. It will end in tears." Des Moore stated on behalf of the Society that "The HR Nicholls Society is very disappointed with the work choices changes."

Howard's successor as leader of the Liberal Party, Brendan Nelson declared that his party has "listened and learned" from the Australian public. He also declared that WorkChoices was "dead" and would never be resurrected as part of Coalition policy, and called on Rudd to move quickly to introduce draft industrial relations legislation. Former IR minister Joe Hockey said the laws "went too deep" but were introduced with "the best intentions". "As I said yesterday and I've said since election day, WorkChoices is dead, and there is an overwhelming mandate for the Labor Party's policy of tearing up WorkChoices," he said.

Former prime minister John Howard broke his post-election silence in March 2008 by attacking Rudd's industrial relations policy while defending WorkChoices.

In March 2008, industrial relations Minister Julia Gillard revealed that the previous government had spent $121 million on what she described as "WorkChoices propaganda" including promotional material such as 98,000 mousepads, 77,000 pens and 100,000 plastic folders.

On 19 March 2008, a bill was passed in the Senate that prevented new AWAs from being made, and set up provisions for workers to be transferred from AWAs into intermediate agreements.

On 27 March 2008, the ban on new AWAs came into effect in Australia. The date was chosen by Acting Prime Minister Julia Gillard to have the law given royal assent as it coincided with the second anniversary of the WorkChoices legislation. "On this two-year anniversary of WorkChoices, we are here to start burying WorkChoices," announced Julia Gillard. Brendan Nelson, leader of the opposition, made it clear that the Liberal-National Coalition will not seek to reintroduce AWAs, saying: "I made it clear on behalf of the Coalition prior to Christmas that WorkChoices is dead."

Greens MP Adam Bandt criticised the 2014 budget as allowing WorkChoices to make an "insidious comeback".

In January 2014, Liberal prime minister Tony Abbott distanced himself from senator Cory Bernardi after the latter called for more flexible industrial relations laws.

== See also ==
- List of political controversies in Australia
- Australian labour law
- Australian Council of Trade Unions (ACTU)
- Australian Industrial Relations Commission (AIRC)
- Australian labour movement
- Section 51(xx) of the Constitution of Australia, article on the 'corporations power' of the Australian Constitution
- New South Wales & Ors v Commonwealth (Workplace Relations Challenge)
- Public holidays in Australia
