= Combet v Commonwealth =

Judgement of the High Court of Australia

- Court: High Court of Australia
- Full case name: Combet and another v The Commonwealth of Australia and others
- Decided: 21 October 2005
- Citations: [2005] HCA 61, (2005) 224 CLR 494; 80 ALJR 247, 221 ALR 621

Case opinions
- Majority: Gummow, Hayne, Callinan & Heydon JJ, Gleeson CJ agreeing (5:2) Expenditure of public funds on advertising promoting Work Choices was authorised by the Appropriation Act (No. 1) 2005–2006
- Dissent: McHugh & Kirby J

Combet v Commonwealth, was an Australian court case commenced in the original jurisdiction of the High Court of Australia by Greg Combet, then the secretary of the Australian Council of Trade Unions, and Nicola Roxon. The plaintiffs challenged the Australian Government's use of public funds to advertise the new Work Choices legislation. The High Court found that the expenditure was authorised by the Appropriation Act (No. 1) 2005–2006.

== Background to the case ==
In May 2005 the Prime Minister informed the Australian House of Representatives that the federal government intended to reform industrial relations laws by introducing a unified national system. In the following weeks, the Australian Council of Trade Unions (ACTU) began an opposition campaign to the proposed laws which included extensive television advertising. On 23 July 2005, the first defendant, the Commonwealth of Australia, printed advertisements in newspapers and on 15 August 2005, the Commonwealth entered into contracts amounting to AU$3.84 million for the purpose of advertising the proposed reforms. The funding for the advertisement was to be drawn out of the public funds of the treasury of the Commonwealth. In October 2005, the ACTU and the Australian Labor Party brought an action against the Federal Government, claiming that the public funds used to advertise the Work Choices legislation were not appropriated by law.

== Arguments ==
Under section 81 of the Australian Constitution, all monies raised by the executive government of the Commonwealth must "be appropriated for the purposes of the Commonwealth in the manner and subject to the charges and liabilities imposed". Section 83 of the Constitution provides that no money shall be drawn from the Treasury of the Commonwealth except under appropriation made by law. Government expenditure is appropriated by law through the annual passing of one or more Appropriation Acts. The question for the High Court was one of statutory construction – that is, whether the advertising was authorised by the Appropriation Act (No. 1) 2005–2006, rather than whether the Act was itself constitutionally valid.

The plaintiffs contended that, contrary to section 83 of the Constitution, the expenditure was not "appropriated by law" as it did not fall within the relevant outcomes set out in schedule 1 of the Appropriation Act. The defendants contended that the advertisements would at least fall within outcome 2, "higher productivity, higher pay workplaces" and also, appropriations should be interpreted broadly.

== Judgment ==
=== Gummow, Hayne, Heydon and Callinan JJ ===
Gummow, Hayne, Heydon and Callinan JJ ruled in favour of the defendants on the basis that departmental items were not tied to their outcomes. In other words, government expenditure was lawful as long as the government had stated what the funds were being used for and that it was not the job of the courts to decide whether government policy would result in its stated goals.

=== Gleeson CJ ===
Chief Justice Gleeson ruled that the advertisement could possibly result in "higher productivity, higher wages" and that it was for parliament to decide how best to achieve its aims.

=== Kirby and McHugh JJ ===
Justices Kirby and McHugh dissented on the account of public funded advertisement not being appropriated at law when it has no nexus with the aims of the expenditure.
