= Pattern bargaining =

Pattern bargaining is a process in labour relations, where a union gains a new and superior entitlement from one employer and then uses that agreement as a precedent to demand the same entitlement or a superior one from other employers.

In the United States, pattern bargaining was pioneered by unions such as the United Auto Workers and the Teamsters. The first step of the bargaining process is the identification of a target employer that is most likely to agree to a favourable employment contract. For the selected company, this provides an opportunity to influence the contract for the industry, while the downside is the risk of a labour disruption if negotiations stall or fail. Once this contract has been successfully negotiated and ratified by the unionized workers, the union declares it a "pattern agreement" and presents it to the other employers as a take-it-or-leave-it offer.

In Australia, pattern bargaining was specifically outlawed under the now-repealed WorkChoices legislation. The law was repealed by the Labor Party after their victory in the 2007 election, but Labor's Fair Work Act, which came into force on 1 July 2010, still outlaws pattern bargaining.
