= Louis Combet =

French paremiologist

Louis Combet (born 23 April 1927 in Aspiran, died 2004) was a French scholar of Spanish language and culture. He specialised in paremiology (the study of proverbs) and was also an authority on the work of Miguel de Cervantes.

Combet was a professor at Lumière University Lyon 2. He bequeathed his private library of Spanish literature, including works on the Spanish Golden Age, Cervantes and paremiology, to the Gabriel Aresti library at the Instituto Cervantes in Lyon.

== Selected works ==
- Correas, Gonzalo (1967). Combet, Louis (ed.). Vocabulario de refranes y frases proverbiales (1627) : Texte établi, annoté et présenté par Louis Combet [Vocabulary of proverbs and sayings (1627) : Text established, annotated and presented by Louis Combet]. Bordeaux: Institut d'etudes Iberiques et Ibero-Americaines de l'Universite de Bordeaux.
- Cervantès, ou, Les incertitudes du désir: une approche psychostructurale de l'œuvre de Cervantès [Cervantes, or, The Uncertainties of Desire: A Psychostructural Approach to Cervantes' Work]. Presses universitaires de Lyon. 1980. ISBN 978-2-7297-0067-6.
