= Philosophical Transactions of the Royal Society =

Scientific journal published by the Royal Society

Philosophical Transactions
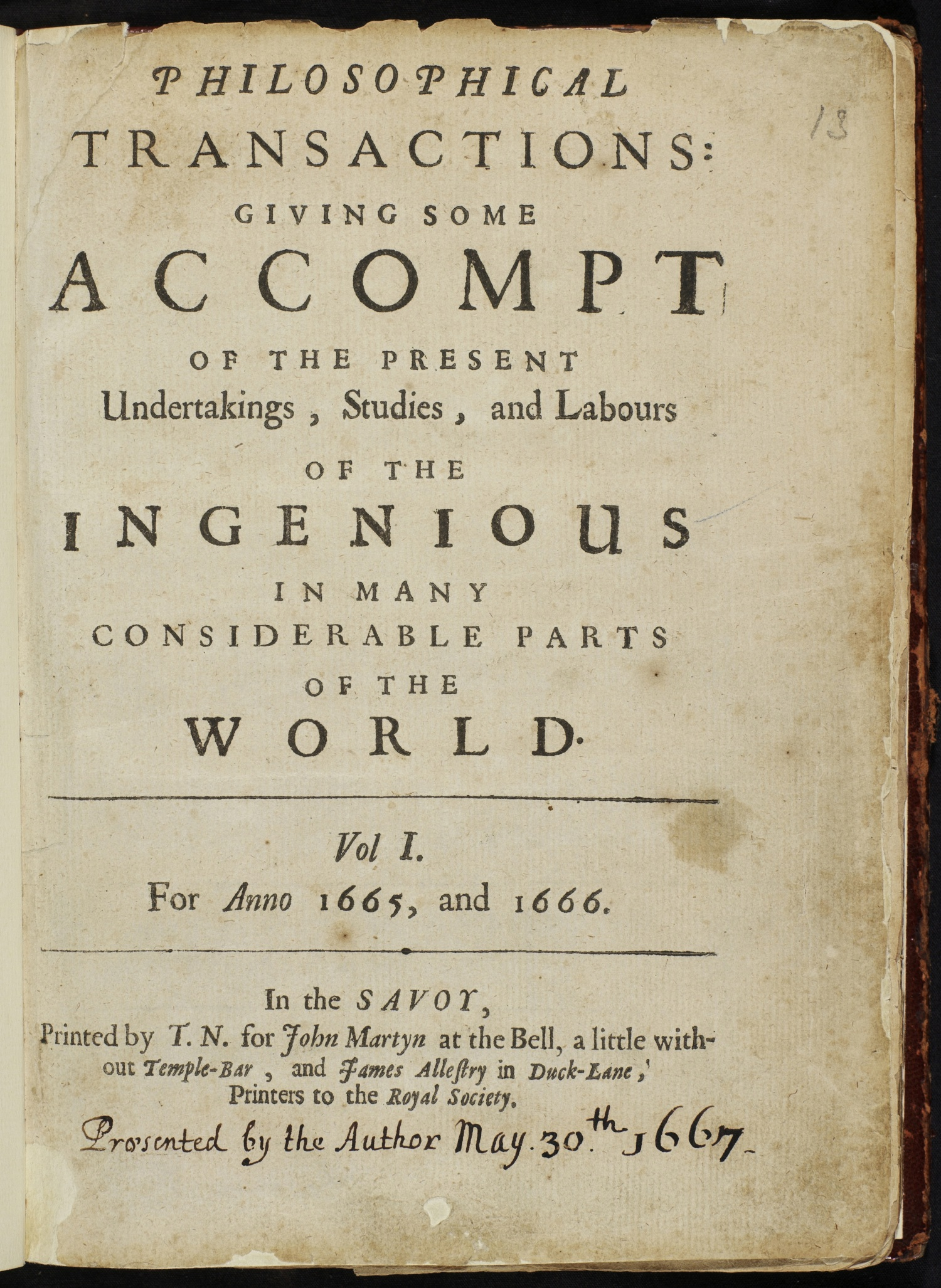
- First volume title page
- Discipline: Multidisciplinary science
- Language: English

Publication details
- History: 6 March 1665; 361 years ago
- Publisher: The Royal Society

Standard abbreviations
- ISO 4: Philos. Trans. R. Soc.

Indexing
- ISSN: 0261-0523 (print); 2053-9223 (web)
- JSTOR: philtran1665167
- OCLC no.: 1697286

Links
- Journal homepage

Philosophical Transactions of the Royal Society is a scientific journal published by the Royal Society. In its earliest days, it was a private venture of the Royal Society's secretary. It was established in 1665, making it the second journal in the world exclusively devoted to science, after the Journal des sçavans, and therefore also the world's longest-running scientific journal. It became an official society publication in 1752. The use of the word philosophical in the title refers to natural philosophy, which was the equivalent of what would now be generally called science.

== Current publication ==
In 1887 the journal expanded and divided into two separate publications, one serving the physical sciences (Philosophical Transactions of the Royal Society A: Mathematical, Physical and Engineering Sciences) and the other focusing on the life sciences (Philosophical Transactions of the Royal Society B: Biological Sciences). Both journals now publish themed issues and issues resulting from papers presented at the scientific meetings of the Royal Society. Primary research articles are published in the sister journals Proceedings of the Royal Society, Biology Letters, Journal of the Royal Society Interface, Interface Focus, Open Biology and Royal Society Open Science.

== Origins and history ==
=== Origins ===
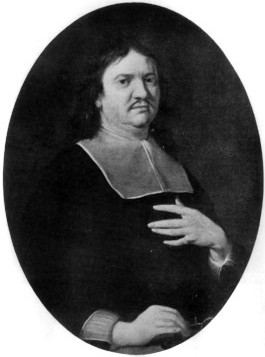
Henry Oldenburg, founding editor and publisher

The first issue, published in London on 6 March 1665, was edited and published by the Royal Society's first secretary, Henry Oldenburg, four-and-a-half years after the society was founded. The full title of the journal, as given by Oldenburg, was "Philosophical Transactions, Giving some Accompt [sic] of the present Undertakings, Studies, and Labours of the Ingenious in many considerable parts of the World". The society's council minutes dated 1 March 1664 (in the Old Style calendar; equivalent to 11 March 1665 in the modern New Style calendar) ordered that "the Philosophical Transactions, to be composed by Mr Oldenburg, be printed the first Monday of every month, if he have sufficient matter for it, and that that tract be licensed by the Council of this Society, being first revised by some Members of the same". Oldenburg published the journal at his own personal expense and seems to have entered into an agreement with the society's council allowing him to keep any resulting profits. He was to be disappointed, however, since the journal performed poorly from a financial point of view during his lifetime, just about covering the rent on his house in Piccadilly. Oldenburg put out 136 issues of the Transactions before his death in 1677.

The familiar functions of the scientific journal—registration (date stamping and provenance), certification (peer review), dissemination, and archiving—were introduced at inception by Philosophical Transactions. The beginnings of these ideas can be traced in a series of letters from Oldenburg to Robert Boyle:

- [24 November 1664] "We must be very careful as well of regist'ring the person and time of any new matter, as the matter itselfe, whereby the honor of the invention will be reliably preserved to all posterity" (registration and archiving)
- [3 December 1664] "...all ingenious men will thereby be incouraged to impact their knowledge and discoverys" (dissemination)
- The council minutes of 1 March 1665 made provisions for the tract to be revised by members of the council of the Royal Society, providing the framework for peer review to eventually develop, becoming fully systematic as a process by the 1830s.

The printed journal replaced much of Oldenburg's letter-writing to correspondents, at least on scientific matters, and as such can be seen as a labour-saving device. Oldenburg also described his journal as "one of these philosophical commonplace books", indicating his intention to produce a collective notebook between scientists. Over the years the form of the contributions to the journal evolved as part of the changing expectations for persuasive scientific claims and the changing roles of scientists with respect to publication.

Issue 1 contained such articles as: an account of the improvement of optic glasses; the first report on the Great Red Spot of Jupiter; a prediction on the motion of a recent comet (probably an Oort cloud object); a review of Robert Boyle's Experimental History of Cold; Robert Boyle's own report of a deformed calf; "A report of a peculiar lead-ore from Germany, and the use thereof"; "Of an Hungarian Bolus, of the Same Effect with the Bolus Armenus"; "Of the New American Whale-Fishing about the Bermudas", and "A Narrative Concerning the Success of Pendulum-Watches at Sea for the Longitudes". The final article of the issue concerned "The Character, Lately Published beyond the Seas, of an Eminent Person, not Long Since Dead at Tholouse, Where He Was a Councellor of Parliament". The eminent person in question was Pierre de Fermat, although the issue failed to mention his last theorem. In the first year of the journal, also the formula for determining the year of the Julian Period, given its character involving three four-digit numbers, was published by Jacques de Billy.

Oldenburg referred to himself as the "compiler" and sometimes "Author" of the Transactions, and always claimed that the journal was entirely his sole enterprise—although with the society's imprimatur and containing reports on experiments carried out and initially communicated by of many of its Fellows, many readers saw the journal as an official organ of the society. It has been argued that Oldenburg benefitted from this ambiguity, retaining both real and perceived independence (giving the publication an air of authenticity) and the prospect of monetary gain, while simultaneously enjoying the credibility afforded by the association. The society also enjoyed the benefits of ambiguity: it was able to communicate advances in natural philosophy, undertaken largely in its own name, without the worry that it was directly responsible for its content. In the aftermath of the Interregnum, the potential for censorship was very real. Certainly the tone of the early volumes was set by Oldenburg, who often related things he was told by his contacts, translated letters and manuscripts from other languages, and reviewed books, always being sure to indicate the provenance of his material and even to use this to impress the reader.

By reporting ongoing and often unfinished scientific work that may otherwise have not been reported, the journal had a central function of being a scientific news service. At the time of Philosophical Transactions' foundation, print was heavily regulated, and there was no such thing as a free press. In fact, the first English newspaper, The London Gazette (which was an official organ of government and therefore seen as sanitized), did not appear until after Philosophical Transactions in the same year.

Oldenburg's compulsive letter writing to foreign correspondents led to him being suspected of being a spy for the Dutch and interned in the Tower of London in 1667. A rival took the opportunity to publish a pirate issue of Philosophical Transactions, with the pretense of it being Issue 27. Oldenburg repudiated the issue by publishing the real 27 upon his release.

Upon Oldenburg's death, following a brief hiatus, the position of Editor was passed down through successive secretaries of the society as an unofficial responsibility and at their own expense. Robert Hooke changed the name of the journal to Philosophical Collections in 1679—a name that remained until 1682, when it changed back. The position of editor was sometimes held jointly and included William Musgrave (Nos 167 to 178) and Robert Plot (Nos 144 to 178).

=== Eighteenth century ===
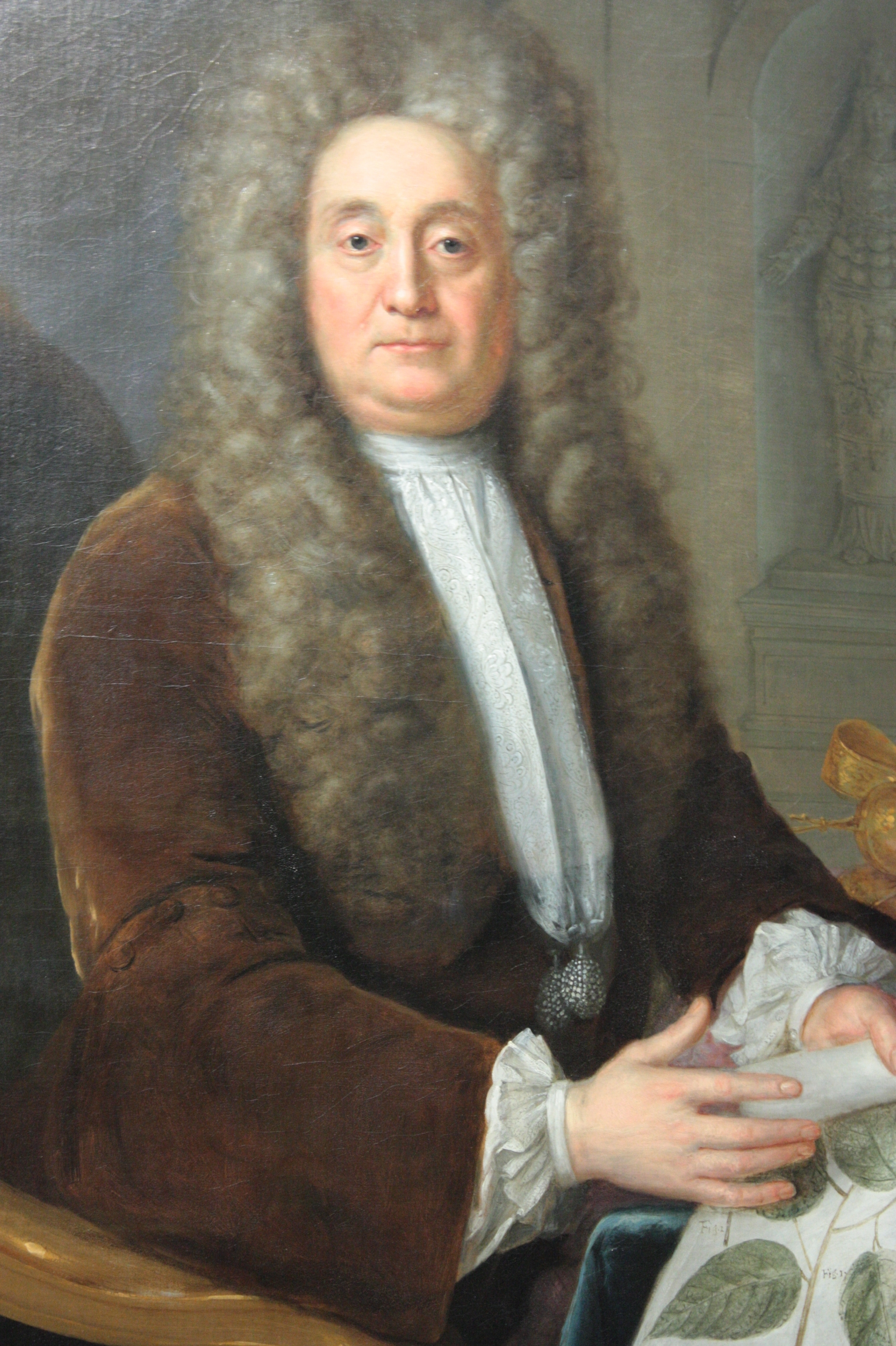
Hans Sloane by Stephen Slaughter, 1736

By the mid-eighteenth century, the most notable editors, besides Oldenburg, were Hans Sloane, James Jurin and Cromwell Mortimer. In virtually all cases the journal was edited by the serving secretary of the society (and occasionally by both secretaries working in tandem). These editor-secretaries carried the financial burden of publishing the Philosophical Transactions. By the early 1750s, the Philosophical Transactions had come under attack, most prominently by John Hill, an actor, apothecary, and naturalist. Hill published three works in two years, ridiculing the Royal Society and the Philosophical Transactions. The society was quick to point out that it was not officially responsible for the journal. Yet, in 1752 the society took over the Philosophical Transactions. The journal would henceforth be published "for the sole use and benefit of this Society"; it would be financially carried by the members' subscriptions; and it would be edited by the Committee of Papers.

After the takeover of the journal by the Royal Society, management decisions including negotiating with printers and booksellers, were still the task of one of the secretaries—but editorial control was exercised through the Committee of Papers. The committee mostly based its judgements on which papers to publish and which to decline on the 300 to 500-word abstracts of papers read during its weekly meetings. But the members could, if they desired, consult the original paper in full. Once the decision to print had been taken, the paper appeared in the volume for that year. It would feature the author's name, the name of the Fellow who had communicated the paper to the society, and the date on which it was read. The Royal Society covered paper, engraving and printing costs. The society found the journal to be a money-losing proposition: it cost, on average, upwards of £300 annually to produce, of which they seldom recouped more than £150. Because two-fifths of the copies were distributed for free to the journal's natural market, sales were generally slow, and although back issues sold out gradually it would usually be ten years or more before there were fewer than 100 left of any given print run.

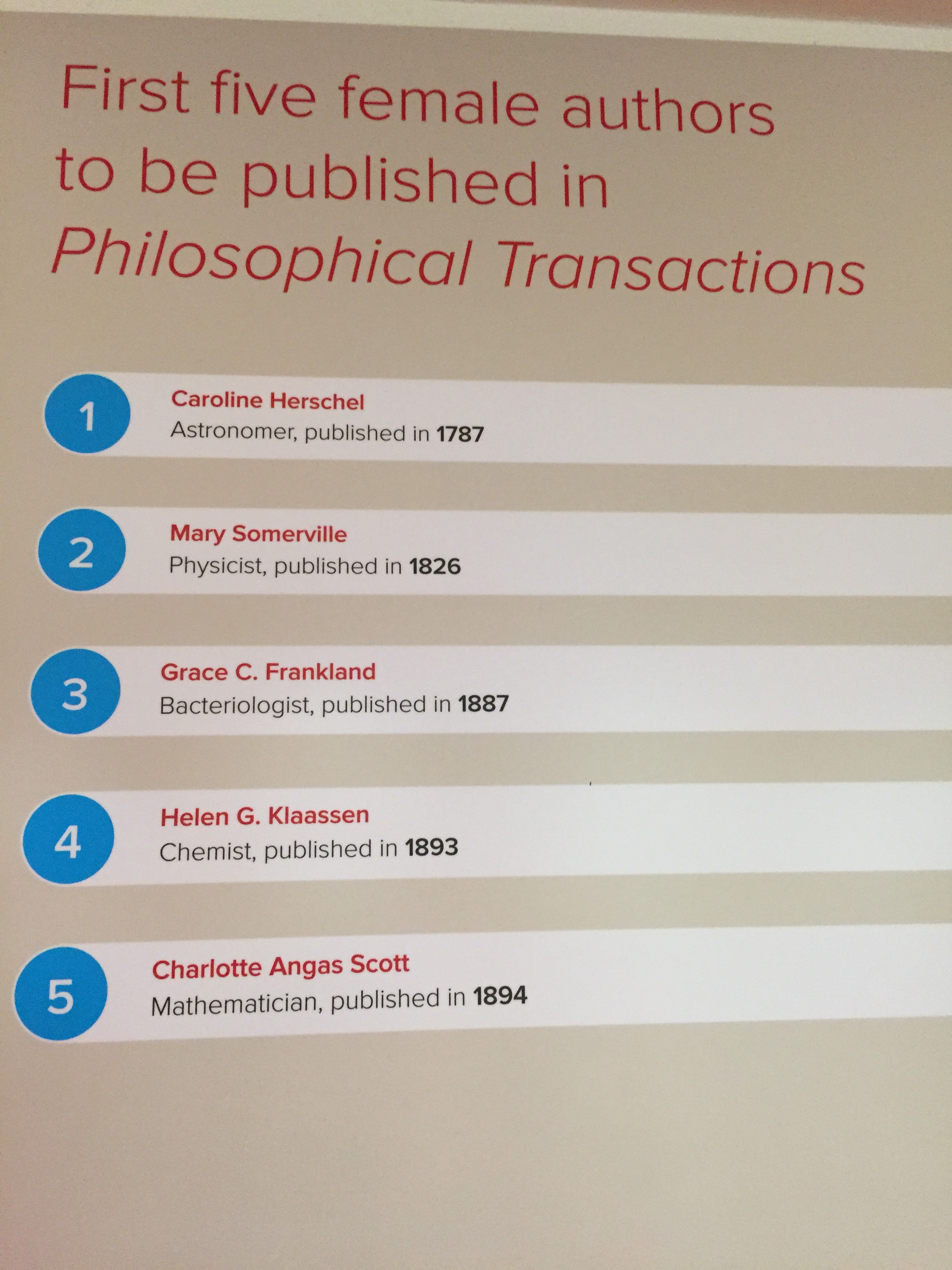
In 1787, Caroline Herschel became the first woman published in the journal and the only one in the 18th century. Poster at Publishing 350 Exhibit, 2015.

During the presidency of Joseph Banks the work of the Committee of Papers continued fairly efficiently, with the President himself in frequent attendance. There was a number of ways in which the president and secretaries could bypass or subvert the Royal Society's publishing procedures. Papers could be prevented from reaching the committee by not allowing them to be read in the first place. Also—though papers were rarely subjected to formal review—there is evidence of editorial intervention, with Banks himself or a trusted deputy proposing cuts or emendations to particular contributions. Publishing in the Philosophical Transactions carried a high degree of prestige and Banks himself attributed an attempt to unseat him, relatively early in his presidency, to the envy of authors whose papers had been rejected from the journal.

=== Nineteenth century ===
Transactions continued steadily through the turn of the century and into the 1820s. In the late 1820s and early 1830s, a movement to reform the Royal Society rose. The reformers felt that the scientific character of the society had been undermined by the admission of too many gentleman dilettantes under Banks. In proposing a more limited membership, to protect the society's reputation, they also argued for systematic, expert evaluation of papers for Transactions by named referees.

Sectional Committees, each with responsibility for a particular group of disciplines, were initially set up in the 1830s to adjudicate the award of George IV's Royal Medals. But individual members of these committees were soon put to work reporting on and evaluating papers submitted to the Royal Society. These evaluations began to be used as the basis of recommendations to the Committee of Papers, who would then rubber-stamp decisions made by the Sectional Committees. Despite its flaws—it was inconsistent in its application and not free of abuses—this system remained at the heart of the society's procedures for publishing until 1847 when the Sectional Committees were dissolved. However, the practice of sending most papers out for review remained.

During the 1850s, the cost of the Transactions to the society was increasing again (and would keep doing so for the rest of the century); illustrations were always the largest expense. Illustrations had been a natural and essential aspect of the scientific periodical since the later seventeenth century. Engravings (cut into metal plates) were used for detailed illustrations, particularly where realism was required; while wood cuts (and, from the early nineteenth century, wood-engravings) were used for diagrams, as they could be easily combined with letterpress.

By the mid-1850s, the Philosophical Transactions was seen as a drain on the society's finances and the treasurer, Edward Sabine, urged the Committee of Papers to restrict the length and number of papers published in the journal. In 1852, for example, the amount expended on the Transactions was £1094, but only £276 of this was offset by sales income. Sabine felt this was more than the society could comfortably sustain. The print run of the journal was 1000 copies. Around 500 of these went to the fellowship, in return for their membership dues, and since authors now received up to 150 off-prints for free, to circulate through their personal networks, the demand for the Transactions through the book trade must have been limited. The concerns with cost eventually led to a change in the printer in 1877 from Taylor & Francis to Harrison & Sons—the latter was a larger commercial printer, able to offer the society a more financially viable contract, although it was less experienced in printing scientific works.

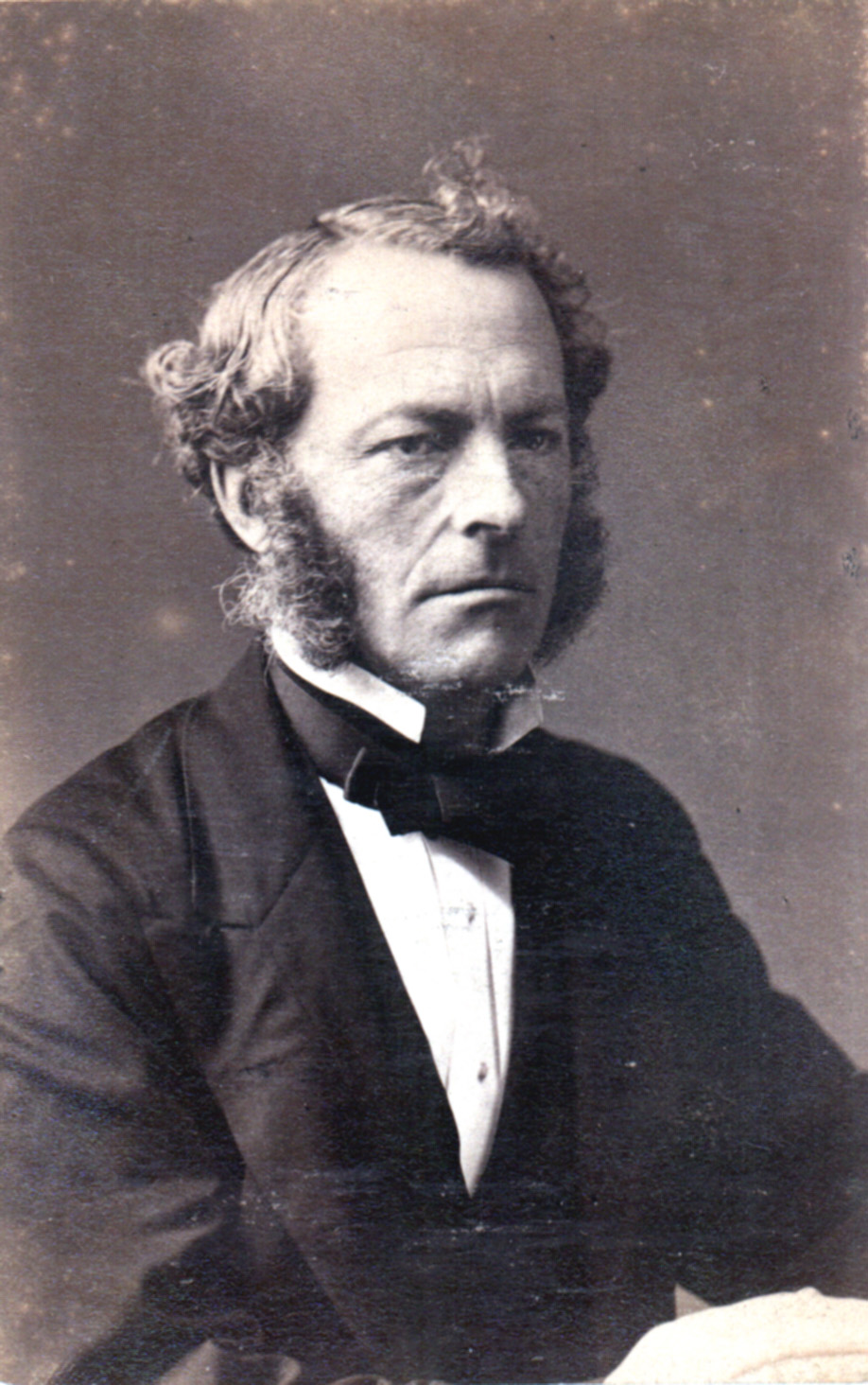
Sir George Stokes

While expenditure was a worry for the treasurer, as secretary (from 1854), George Gabriel Stokes was preoccupied with the actual content of the Transactions and his extensive correspondence with authors over his thirty-one-year term. He took up most of his time beyond his duties as Lucasian Professor at Cambridge. Stokes was paramount in establishing a more formalized refereeing process at the Royal Society. It was not until Stokes' presidency ended in 1890 that his influence over the journal diminished. The introduction of fixed terms for society officers precluded subsequent editors from taking on Stokes' mantle and meant that the society operated its editorial practices more collectively than it had done since the mechanisms for it were established in 1752.

By the mid-nineteenth century, getting a paper published in the Transactions still relied on the paper first being read by a Fellow. Many papers were sent immediately for printing in abstract form in Proceedings of the Royal Society. But those which were being considered for printing in full in Transactions were usually sent to two referees for comment before the final decision was made by the Committee of Papers. During Stokes' time, authors were given the opportunity to discuss their paper at length with him before, during and after its official submission to the Committee of Papers.

In 1887, the Transactions split into series "A" and "B", dealing with the physical and biological sciences respectively. In 1897, the model of collective responsibility for the editing of the Transactions was emphasized by the re-establishment of the Sectional Committees. The six sectional committees covered mathematics, botany, zoology, physiology, geology, and (together) chemistry and physics, and were composed of Fellows of the society with relevant expertise. The Sectional Committees took on the task of managing the refereeing process after papers had been read before the society. Referees were usually Fellows, except in a small number of cases where the topic was beyond the knowledge of the fellowship (or at least, of those willing to referee). The Sectional Committees communicated referee reports to authors; and sent reports to the Committee of Papers for final sanction. The Sectional Committees were intended to reduce the burden on the secretaries and Council. Consequently, the secretary in the 1890s, Arthur Rucker, no longer coordinated the refereeing of papers, nor did he generally correspond extensively with authors about their papers as Stokes had done. However, he continued to be the first port of call for authors submitting papers.

=== Twentieth century ===
Authors were increasingly expected to submit manuscripts in a standardized format and style. From 1896, they were encouraged to submit typed papers on foolscap-folio-sized paper to lighten the work of getting papers ready for printing and to reduce the chance of error in the process. A publishable paper now had to present its information in an appropriate manner, as well as being of remarkable scientific interest. For a brief period between 1907 and 1914, authors were under even more pressure to conform to the society's expectations, due to a decision to discuss cost estimates of candidate papers alongside referees' reports. The committees could require authors to reduce the number of illustrations or tables or, indeed, the overall length of the paper, as a condition of acceptance. It was hoped that this policy would reduce the still-rising costs of production, which had reached £1747 in 1906; but the effect appears to have been negligible, and the cost estimates ceased to be routine practice after 1914.

It was only after the Second World War that the society's concerns about the cost of its journals were finally allayed. There had been a one-off surplus in 1932, but it was only from 1948 that the Transactions began regularly to end the year in surplus. That year, despite a three-fold increase in production costs (it was a bumper year for papers), there was a surplus of almost £400. Part of the post-war financial success of the Transactions was due to the rising subscriptions received, and a growing number of subscriptions from British and international institutions, including universities, industry, and government; this was at the same time as private subscriptions, outside of fellows, were non-existent. By the early 1970s, institutional subscription was the main channel of income from publication sales for the society. From 1970 to 1971, 43,760 copies of Transactions were sold, of which casual purchasers accounted for only 2070 copies.

All of the society's publications now had a substantial international circulation; in 1973, for example, just 11% of institutional subscriptions were from the United Kingdom; 50% were from the United States. Contributions, however, were still mostly from British authors: 69% of Royal Society authors were from the United Kingdom in 1974. A Publications Policy Committee suggested that more overseas scientists could be encouraged to submit papers if the requirement to have papers communicated by Fellows was dropped. This did not happen until 1990. There was also a suggestion to create a "C" journal for molecular sciences to attract more authors in that area, but the idea never materialized. The conclusion in 1973 was a general appeal to encourage more British scientists (whether Fellows or not) to publish papers with the society and to pass on the message to their overseas colleagues; by the early 2000s, the proportion of non-UK authors had risen to around a half; and by 2017 it had passed 80%.

As the twentieth century came to a close, the editing of the Transactions and the society's other journals became more professional with the employment of a growing in-house staff of editors, designers and marketers. In 1968 there were about eleven staff in the Publishing Section; by 1990, the number had risen to twenty-two. The editorial processes were also transformed. In 1968 the Sectional Committees had been abolished (again). Instead, the secretaries, Harrie Massey (physicist) and Bernard Katz (physiologist), were each assigned a group of Fellows to act as associate editors for each series ("A" and "B") of the Transactions. The role of the Committee of Papers was abolished in 1989 and since 1990 two Fellows (rather than the secretaries) have acted as the editors with assistance from associate editors. The editors serve on the Publishing Board, established in 1997 to monitor publishing and report to the council. In the 1990s, as these changes to the publishing and editorial teams were implemented, the Publishing Section acquired its first computer for administration; the Transactions were first published online in 1997.

== Famous and notable contributors ==
Over the centuries, many important scientific discoveries have been published in the Philosophical Transactions. Famous contributing authors include:

Isaac Newton	His first paper New Theory about Light and Colours, (1672) can be seen as the beginning of his public scientific career.
Anton van Leeuwenhoek	Leeuwenhoek's 1677 paper, the famous 'letter on the protozoa', gives the first detailed description of protists and bacteria living in a range of environments, sent by the author in a Dutch letter of the 9 Octob. 1676 concerning little animals by him observed in rain-well-sea and snow water; as also in water wherein pepper had lain infused.
Benjamin Franklin	The American statesman was the sole or co-author of 19 papers in Philosophical Transactions, including an experiment on the calming effects of oil on water (of great significance to current scientific fields including surface chemistry and physics, and self-assembly) carried out on a Clapham Common pond. But his reputation was cemented by his "Philadelphia Experiment", A Letter of Benjamin Franklin, Esq; to Mr. Peter Collinson, F. R. S. concerning an Electrical Kite – recognized as one of the most famous scientific experiments of all time – and published in the Philosophical Transactions in 1753. He later founded the American Philosophical Society in Philadelphia, closely modelled on the Royal Society.
William Roy	Between 1747 and 1755, William Roy organised and carried out an innovative Military Survey of Scotland. He then gained military rank, and throughout his career promoted extending this to a survey triangulation of the whole of Britain. In the 1780s Major General William Roy measured the distance between the Greenwich and Paris observatories, promoting a method of triangulation and instruments designed and built by Jesse Ramsden. This work led to much more accurate records of longitudes for both the British and French – remarkable during a century of near-constant warfare between the two nations. The work was written up in three papers in Philosophical Transactions, culminating in a 1790 publication, An Account of the Trigonometrical Operation, Whereby the Distance between the Meridians of the Royal Observatories of Greenwich and Paris Has Been Determined (with Isaac Dalby). While, like most English maps at the time, the prime meridian is centred on St Paul's cathedral (a system the vestiges of which can be found in the naming of the British road network), Roy's figure showing the triangulation of major distances between England and France takes Greenwich as the prime meridian. While this had been suggested before, notably by Edmund Halley in 1710, this was one of the first major works to take Greenwich as prime meridian, anticipating its status as the universal prime meridian. Roy's work in Philosophical Transactions led to the Ordnance Survey of Great Britain.
Caroline Herschel	The first paper by a woman in the journal, An account of a new comet appeared in 1787. Caroline Herschel was paid a salary of £50 per annum by the King to work with her brother William Herschel as an astronomer – unusual at a time when most who worked in astronomy or science did so without pay, regardless of gender
Mary Somerville	On the Magnetizing Power of the More Refrangible Solar Rays was one of two papers submitted to Philosophical Transactions by the Scottish polymath, translator of Laplace and friend of J. M. W. Turner. In it, she communicates her finding that the ultraviolet components of the electromagnetic spectrum could magnetize a steel needle. While subsequent experiments were not able to reproduce this finding, leading Somerville to retract her claim (exactly in accordance with what would be expected of a scientist today), her reputation was secured. In some ways, her hypothesis remarkably prescient: the photoelectric effect is more likely to occur when metals are irradiated by light at the violet end of the spectrum.
Charles Darwin	Darwin's only paper in Philosophical Transactions, the snappily titled Observations on the Parallel Roads of Glen Roy, and of Other Parts of Lochaber in Scotland, with an Attempt to Prove That They Are of Marine Origin (1837) describes parallel lines cut horizontally across the hillsides of Glen Roy, and proposes that they had marine origins as had similar features he had seen at Coquimbo in Chile while on the Beagle expedition. In 1840 the lines were explained by French geologist Louis Agassiz as due to a lake formed in an ice age. After many years of argument, Darwin conceded in 1862 that his paper was "one long gigantic blunder". In his autobiography, Darwin claims, "This paper was a great failure, and I am ashamed of it."
Michael Faraday	Publishing over 40 papers in the journal, Faraday rose from a fairly humble background to become a world-famous and highly respected scientist. His final paper in the journal, which was given as the Bakerian Lecture in 1857, Experimental Relations of Gold (and Other Metals) to Light, introduced the idea of metal particles that were smaller than the wavelength of light – colloidal sols or what would now be called nanoparticles.
James Clerk Maxwell	In On the Dynamical Theory of the Electromagnetic Field (1865) Maxwell described how electricity and magnetism could travel as a wave and inferred from the velocity given by the wave equation, and by known experimental determinations of the speed of light, that light was an electromagnetic wave.
Kathleen Lonsdale	Lonsdale's work carried out at the Royal Institution led to 17 papers in Royal Society journals, two of which were in Philosophical Transactions. Like many notable figures in the 'new sciences' of structural and cell biology, and also the new physics (which included Paul Dirac), she published the bulk of her work in the more regular Proceedings of the Royal Society. Her 1947 paper, Divergent-Beam X-Ray Photography of Crystals, built on earlier work to show how this nuanced technique could reveal information about the purity and degree of 'perfection' of a crystal.
Dorothy Hodgkin	Dorothy Crowfoot Hodgkin's record of publishing in Royal Society journals spanned 50 years, beginning in 1938. Out of 20 papers, only two were published in Philosophical Transactions, the first in 1940, when she was still called Dorothy Crowfoot and was working with JD Bernal. The second, in 1988, was her final publication in a Royal Society journal. Hodgkin used advanced techniques to crystallize proteins, allowing their structures to be elucidated by X-ray crystallography, including Vitamin B-12 and insulin
Alan Turing	Turing's 1952 paper, On the Chemical Basis of Morphogenesis, gave a chemical and physical basis for many of the patterns and forms found in nature, a year before the structure of DNA was reported by Watson and Crick, who published their initial findings in Nature and subsequently published an expanded version in Proceedings of the Royal Society A, another of the Royal Society's journals. In his paper, Turing coins the term morphogen, which is now used in the sciences of developmental biology and epigenetics, to denote a chemical species that modulates the growth of a species.
Stephen Hawking	A 1983 paper The Cosmological Constant was actually Hawking's seventh in a Royal Society journal, but his first in Philosophical Transactions (all the others appeared in Proceedings). The paper was first presented at a themed meeting at the Royal Society, providing a model for the journal's content that continues to this day (unlike Proceedings, which publishes new research on any scientific subject, divided along the physical and life sciences, Philosophical Transactions is now always themed and roughly half of the time taken from open 'discussion' meetings at the society's headquarters in London, which are free to attend). The meeting in this instance also featured papers given by future Astronomer Royal and President of the Royal Society Martin Rees, then-recent Nobel Laureate Steven Weinberg, future winners of Royal Society premier medals Chris Llewellyn Smith and John Ellis, and Michael Faraday Prize winner and popular science author John D Barrow.

== Public domain and access ==
In July 2011 programmer Greg Maxwell released through The Pirate Bay the nearly 19,000 articles that had been published before 1923 and were therefore in the public domain in the United States, to support Aaron Swartz in his case. The articles had been digitized for the Royal Society by JSTOR for a cost of less than US$100,000 and public access to them was restricted through a paywall.

In August 2011, users uploaded over 18,500 articles to the collections of the Internet Archive. The collection received 50,000 views per month by November 2011.

In October of the same year, the Royal Society released for free the full text of all its articles prior to 1941 but denied that this decision had been influenced by Maxwell's actions.

In 2017, the Royal Society launched a completely re-digitised version of the complete journal archive back to 1665 in high resolution and with enhanced metadata. All the out of copyright material is completely free to access without a login.

== Literary references ==
The protagonist of Nathaniel Hawthorne's "The Birthmark" alludes to the older editions of the Philosophical Transactions, comparing them to the occult writings of earlier natural philosophers:

Hardly less curious and imaginative were the early volumes of the Transactions of the Royal Society, in which the members, knowing little of the limits of natural possibility, were continually recording wonders or proposing methods whereby wonders might be wrought.

— Nathaniel Hawthorne, "The Birthmark"

The journal is also mentioned by the narrator in Chapter 6 of The Time Machine by H. G. Wells

Had I been a literary man I might, perhaps, have moralised upon the futility of all ambition. But as it was, the thing that struck me with keenest force was the enormous waste of labour to which this sombre wilderness of rotting paper testified. At the time I will confess that I thought chiefly of the Philosophical Transactions and my own seventeen papers upon physical optics.

— H. G. Wells, the Time Machine (1895)

== See also ==
- Journal des sçavans: the first academic journal (started two months earlier than the present one), although it is not the longest-running journal because publication was interrupted for 24 years (between 1792 and 1816); it published some science, but also contained subject matter from other fields of learning, and its main content type was book reviews.
