= Tim Hunt =

British biochemist

Sir Tim Hunt FRS FRSE FMedSci MAE
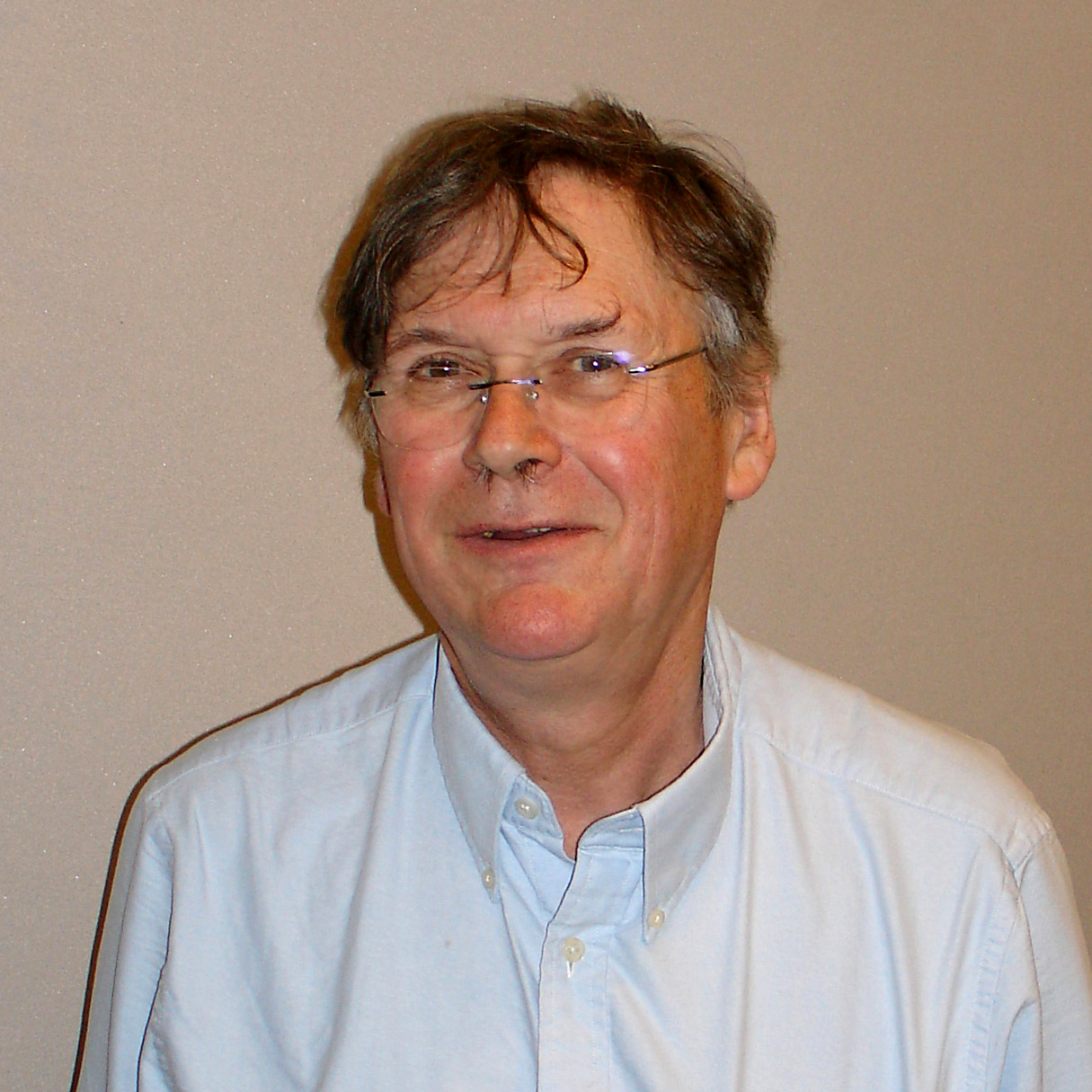
- Hunt at UCSF in 2009
- Born: Richard Timothy Hunt; 19 February 1943 (age 83); Neston, Cheshire, England
- Education: Dragon School; Magdalen College School, Oxford
- Alma mater: University of Cambridge (BA, PhD)
- Known for: Cell cycle regulation
- Spouse: Mary Collins (m. 1995)
- Children: Two daughters
- Awards: Nobel Prize in Physiology or Medicine (2001); Royal Medal (2006); Knight Bachelor (2006)
- Scientific career
- Fields: Biochemistry
- Workplaces: London Research Institute; University College London; Imperial Cancer Research Fund; University of Cambridge; Marine Biological Laboratory; Francis Crick Institute
- Thesis: The synthesis of haemoglobin (1969)
- Doctoral advisor: Asher Korner
- Doctoral students: Hugh Pelham; Jonathon Pines

Sir Richard Timothy Hunt (born 19 February 1943) is a British biochemist and molecular physiologist. He was awarded the 2001 Nobel Prize in Physiology or Medicine with Paul Nurse and Leland H. Hartwell for their discoveries of protein molecules that control the division of cells. While studying fertilized sea urchin eggs in the early 1980s, Hunt discovered cyclin, a protein that cyclically aggregates and is depleted during cell division cycles.

== Early life and education ==
Hunt was born on 19 February 1943 in Neston, Cheshire, to Richard William Hunt, a lecturer in palaeography in Liverpool, and Kit Rowland, daughter of a timber merchant. After the death of both his parents, Hunt found his father had worked at Bush House, then the headquarters of BBC World Service radio, most likely in intelligence, although it is not known what he actually did. In 1945, Richard became Keeper of the Western Manuscripts at the Bodleian Library, and the family relocated to Oxford. At the age of eight, Hunt was accepted into the Dragon School, where he first developed an interest in biology thanks to his science teacher, the German educator Gerd Sommerhoff. When he was fourteen, he moved to Magdalen College School, Oxford, becoming even more interested in science and studying subjects such as chemistry and zoology.

In 1961, he was accepted into Clare College, Cambridge, to study Natural Sciences, graduating in 1964 and immediately beginning work in the university Department of Biochemistry under Asher Korner. There, he worked with scientists such as Louis Reichardt and Tony Hunter. A 1965 talk by Vernon Ingram interested him in haemoglobin synthesis, and at a Greek conference in 1966 on the subject, he persuaded the haematologist and geneticist Irving London to allow him to work in his laboratory at Albert Einstein College of Medicine in New York, staying from July to October 1966. His PhD was supervised by Asher Korner and focused on haemoglobin synthesis in intact rabbit reticulocytes (immature red blood cells), and was awarded in 1968.

== Career and research ==
=== Early career ===
Following his PhD, Hunt returned to New York to work with London, in collaboration with Nechama Kosower, her husband Edward Kosower, and Ellie Ehrenfeld. While there, they discovered that tiny amounts of glutathione inhibited protein synthesis in reticulocytes and that tiny amounts of RNA killed the synthesis altogether. After returning to Cambridge, he again began work with Tony Hunter and Richard Jackson, who had discovered the RNA strand used to start haemoglobin synthesis. After 3–4 years, the team discovered at least two other chemicals acting as inhibitors.

Hunt regularly spent summers working at the Marine Biological Laboratory at Woods Hole, Massachusetts, which was popular with scientists for its advanced summer courses, and in particular, with those interested in the study of mitosis. The location provided a ready supply of surf clams (Spisula solidissima) and sea urchins (Arbacia punctulata) amongst the reefs and fishing docks, and it was these invertebrates that were particularly useful for the study of the synthesis of proteins in embryogenesis, as the embryos were simply generated with the application of filtered sea water, and the transparency of the embryo cells was well suited to microscopic study.

=== Discovery of cyclins ===
It was at Woods Hole around July 1982, using Arbacia sea urchin eggs as his model organism, that he discovered cyclin proteins. Cyclins play a key role in regulating the cell-division cycle. Hunt was observing the eggs undergo cell division after fertilization. The study also included a control group where the eggs had been activated without fertilization by a calcium ionophore. The eggs were incubated with the amino acid methionine in which some of the atoms were radioactive isotopes (radiolabelled), with samples being taken from the eggs at 10 minute intervals. During the egg development, the radioactive methionine was uptaken into the cells and used to make proteins. From the samples, proteins were precipitated and then separated by mass into distinct bands on a resolving gel mat, which were then observed by photographic film that could detect the radioactivity emitted by the proteins. Observing the changes in the bands across the samples, Hunt noticed that one of the proteins rose in abundance before disappearing during the mitosis phase of cell division. Hunt named the protein "cyclin" based on his observation of the cyclical changes in its levels. It was later discovered that cyclins are continuously synthesised, but are specifically targeted for proteolysis during mitosis. The discovery of cyclins was reported in a study published in Cell in 1983. Hunt later demonstrated that cyclins were also present in another sea urchin, Lytechinus pictus, as well as in Spisula clams.

Hunt was aware that the discovery of cyclins was significant, but was initially unsure of how cyclins functioned in regard to cell division. This was clarified in later papers in the 1980s and 1990s, some of which Hunt co-authored. These again utilized sea urchin eggs as well as eggs of the frog Xenopus, and demonstrated that cyclins were present in the cells of most organisms, and combine with kinase enzymes (specifically cyclin-dependent kinases) to form maturation-promoting factor (MPF). MPF has previously been identified in 1971 by Yoshio Masui and Clement Markert from Xenopus eggs. MPF induces mitosis, with the cyclic activation and inactivation of MPF being a key element in regulating and progressing the cell cycle.

=== Later career ===
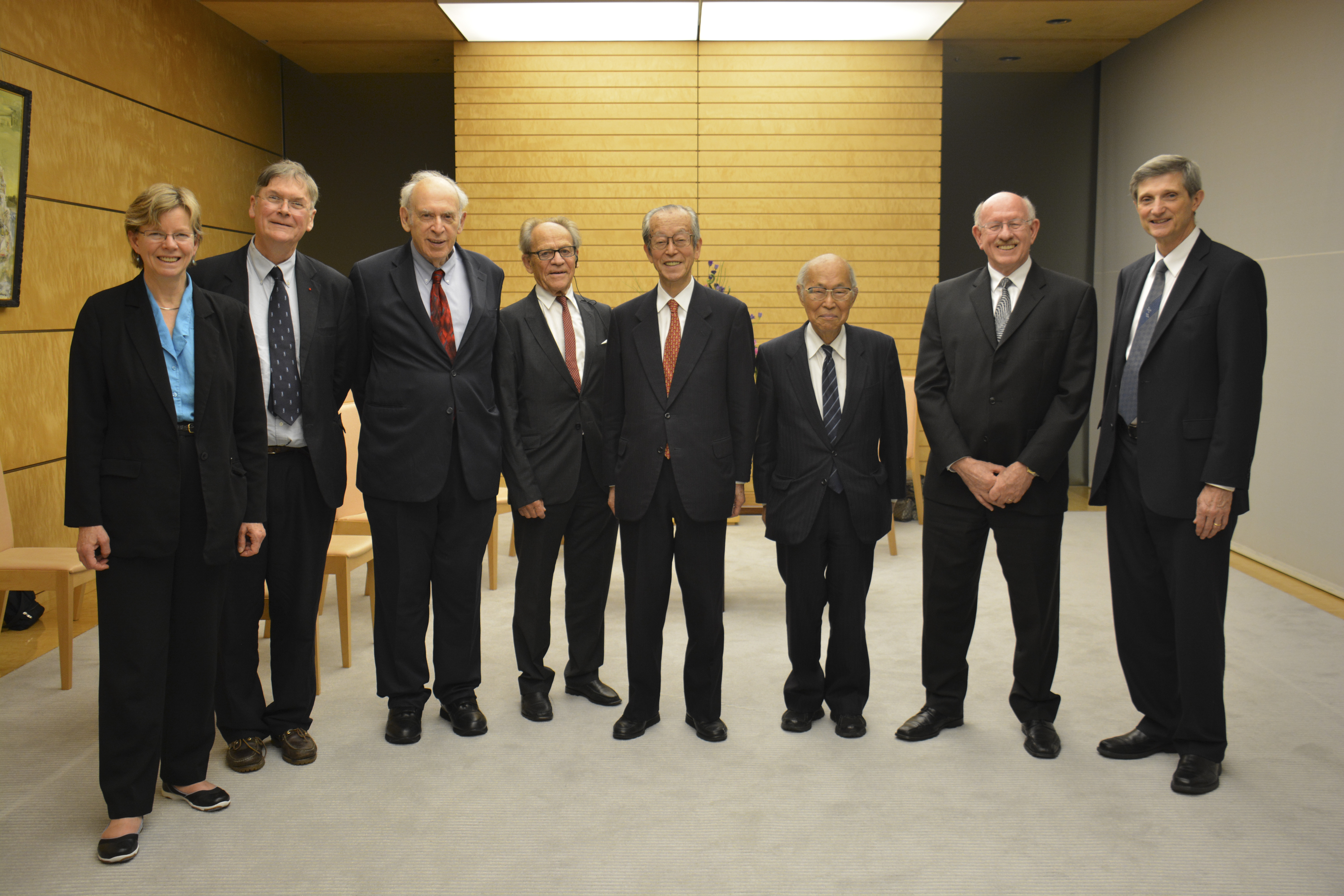
with Cherry A. Murray, Jerome Isaac Friedman, Torsten Wiesel, Kōji Omi, Akito Arima, Jonathan M. Dorfan and Robert Baughman

In 1990, he began work at Imperial Cancer Research Fund, later known as the Cancer Research UK London Research Institute, in the United Kingdom, where his work focused on understanding on what makes cell go cancerous, that is: proliferate uncontrollably, with the ordinary inhibitory signals switched off. That same year, Hunt defined the concept of short linear motifs, parts of protein sequences that mediate interactions with other proteins. In 1993, the book The Cell Cycle: An Introduction, which Hunt co-authored along with Andrew Murray, was published by Oxford University Press. Hunt had his own laboratory at the Clare Hall Laboratories until the end of 2010, and remains an Emeritus Group Leader at the Francis Crick Institute. He is a member of the Advisory Council for the Campaign for Science and Engineering. He has served on the Selection Committee for the Shaw Prize in Life Science and Medicine. In 2010, Hunt joined the Academic Advisory Board of the Austrian think tank Academia Superior, Institute for Future Studies.

Hunt has been a mentor and collaborator to researchers in the scientific community. During his career, he has supervised numerous PhD students, including Hugh Pelham and Jonathon Pines.

=== Science advocacy ===
In addition to his scientific contributions, Hunt is a lifelong advocate for scientific research. After winning the Nobel Prize in 2001, he spent much of his time traveling the world, talking to both popular and specialist audiences. In these talks he offered his characteristic perspective on inquiry, which emphasizes the importance of having fun and being lucky. He also believes that science benefits when power is given to young people, himself having been given full autonomy and authority at age 27.

==== 2015 controversy ====
At the World Conference of Science Journalists in Seoul in June 2015, Hunt gave a impromptu toast at a lunch for female journalists and scientists. As recounted by an EU official, Hunt said:

It's strange that such a chauvinist monster like me has been asked to speak to women scientists. Let me tell you about my trouble with girls. Three things happen when they are in the lab: you fall in love with them, they fall in love with you, and when you criticise them they cry. Perhaps we should make separate labs for boys and girls? Now, seriously, I'm impressed by the economic development of Korea. And women scientists played, without a doubt, an important role in it. Science needs women, and you should do science, despite all the obstacles, and despite monsters like me.

Parts of the remarks were widely publicised on social media due to their perceived sexist nature, resulting in an intense online backlash, which some described as an act of public shaming. Hunt resigned from his honorary professorship at University College London after the university told him to; he also resigned from several other research positions. Hunt apologised and stated that the remarks were in jest. He said that they had been taken out of context, as the remarks had originally been reported without the words starting with "now seriously". Hunt also stated he "did mean the part about having trouble with girls". Some public figures and scientists, including some who had worked with Hunt, suggested that the backlash against him was disproportionate.

== Awards and honours ==
Hunt was elected a member of the European Molecular Biology Organization (EMBO) in 1978, serving as a member of the organisation's Fellowship Committee 1990–1993, its Meeting Committee 2008–2009, and its governing body, the Council, 2004–2009. He was elected a Fellow of the Royal Society (FRS) in 1991, his certificate of election reads:

Distinguished for his studies of the control of protein synthesis in animal cells and for the discovery of cyclin, a protein which regulates the eukaryotic cell cycle. Together with Jackson and their students, he defined steps in formation of the initiation complex in protein synthesis, showing that the 40S ribosomal subunit binds initiator tRNA before it binds mRNA, and that this step was the target of inhibitors such as double-stranded RNA or haem deficiency. They showed that inhibition of protein synthesis is mediated by reversible phosphorylation of initiation factor eIF-2 by two distinct protein kinases and they elucidated the unexpected roles of thioredoxin and thioredoxin reductase in protein synthesis. With Ruderman and Rosenthal, he demonstrated selective translational control of mRNA in early clam embryos. This led to Hunt's discovery of cyclin as a protein which is selectively destroyed in mitosis. He subsequently cloned and sequenced cyclin cDNA from sea urchins and frogs and showed by elegant mRNA ablation experiments that cyclin translation is necessary for mitosis in frog embryos. He has also shown that cyclin is a subunit of the mitosis-promoting factor which regulates entry into mitosis. His discovery and characterization of cyclin are major contributions to our knowledge of cell cycle regulation in eukaryotic cells.

Hunt was elected a fellow of the UK's Academy of Medical Sciences (FMedSci) in 1998, and a foreign associate of the US National Academy of Sciences in 1999.

In 2001, he was awarded the Nobel Prize in Physiology or Medicine with Leland Hartwell and Paul Nurse for their discoveries regarding cell cycle regulation by cyclin and cyclin-dependent kinases. The three laureates are cited "for their discoveries of key regulators of the cell cycle," while Hunt in particular

is awarded for his discovery of cyclins, proteins that regulate the CDK function. He showed that cyclins are degraded periodically at each cell division, a mechanism proved to be of general importance for cell cycle control.

In 2003, Hunt was made an honorary Fellow of the Royal Society of Edinburgh (HonFRSE). In 2006, he was awarded the Royal Society's Royal Medal, two of which are presented annually for "the most important contributions to the advancement of natural knowledge", in his case for "discovering a key aspect of cell cycle control, the protein cyclin which is a component of cyclin dependent kinases, demonstrating his ability to grasp the significance of the result outside his immediate sphere of interest".

Hunt was knighted in the 2006 Birthday Honours for his service to science.

== Personal life ==
Hunt is married to the immunologist Mary Collins, who was provost of the Okinawa Institute of Science and Technology in Japan, and is Director of the Blizard Institute Queen Mary University of London. The couple have two daughters.

== Bibliography ==
- Murray, Andrew; Hunt, Tim (1993). The Cell Cycle: An Introduction. Oxford: Oxford University Press. ISBN 978-0-19-509529-6.
- Wilson, John; Hunt, Tim (2014). Molecular Biology of the Cell: The Problems Book (6th ed.). Taylor & Francis Ltd. ISBN 978-0-8153-4453-7.
