= Jonathon Pines =

British oncologist (born 1961)

Professor Jonathon Pines FRS FMedSci
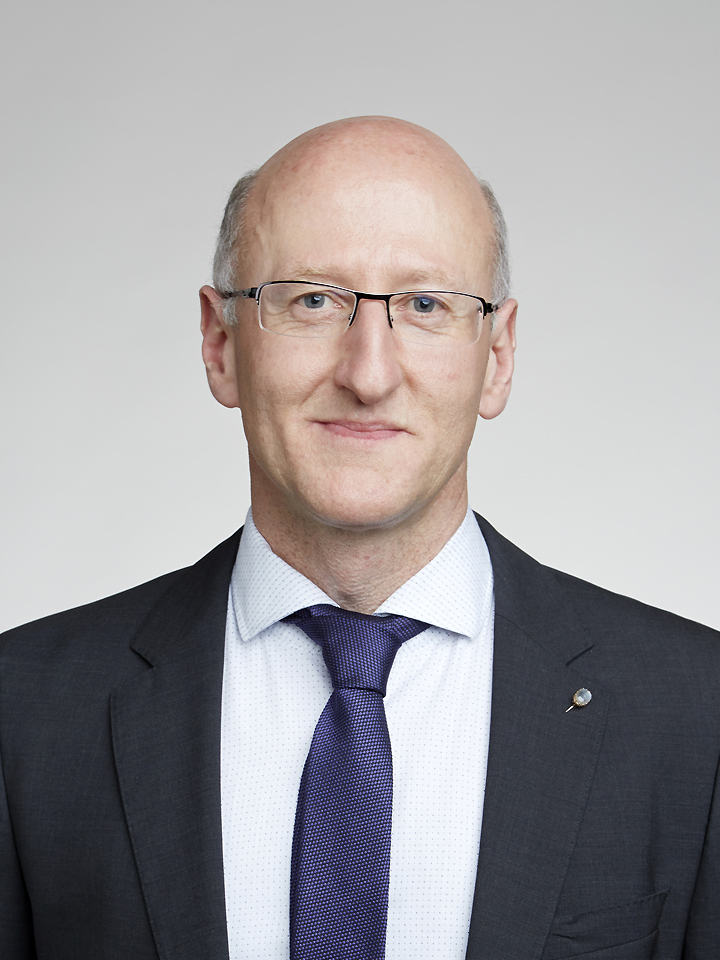
- Pines in 2016
- Born: Jonathon Noë Joseph Pines; 11 October 1961 (age 64)
- Education: University of Cambridge (BA, PhD)
- Awards: EMBO Member (2001)
- Scientific career
- Fields: Cyclin; Mitosis; Cell cycle
- Workplaces: Gurdon Institute; Institute of Cancer Research; Salk Institute for Biological Studies
- Thesis: Cyclin: a major maternal message in sea urchin eggs (1987)
- Doctoral advisor: Tim Hunt
- Other academic advisors: Anthony R. Hunter
- Doctoral students: Viji Draviam
- Website: icr.ac.uk/our-research/researchers-and-teams/professor-jonathon-pines

Jonathon Noë Joseph Pines (born 11 October 1961) is head of the Cancer Biology Division at the Institute of Cancer Research in London. He was formerly a senior group leader at the Gurdon Institute at the University of Cambridge.

== Education ==
Pines was educated at the University of Cambridge where he was awarded a PhD in 1987 for research on cyclin in sea urchin eggs supervised by Tim Hunt.

== Research and career ==
Following his PhD, Pines was a postdoctoral researcher supervised by Anthony R. Hunter at the Salk Institute in La Jolla, California before moving to the Gurdon Institute at the University of Cambridge then the Institute of Cancer Research in 2015.

Pines research investigates cyclin, the cell cycle and mitosis. He pioneered the use of fluorescent tags to analyse the dynamic behaviour and stability of these regulators in living cells.

Pines discoveries have revealed that mitotic regulators are targeted to specific substructures at specific times, and that mitosis is exquisitely coordinated by the destruction of key regulators at different times in cell division. Pines work has provided insights into how chromosome behaviour in mitosis controls both the time and the rate at which essential mitotic regulators are destroyed, and these discoveries have wider implications for how cancers develop.

Since 2020, Pines has been Editor-in-Chief of the Royal Society journal Open Biology.

=== Awards and honours ===
Pines was elected a member of the European Molecular Biology Organisation (EMBO) in 2001 and a Fellow of the Academy of Medical Sciences (FMedSci) in 2005. His citation on election reads:

He has made key discoveries in the cell cycle field, many of which have opened up new avenues of research. He cloned the original 'cyclin' as a PhD student with Tim Hunt and demonstrated that it had mitosis-promoting activity. This discovery was essential to the subsequent cloning of Xenopus cyclins and kept the Hunt lab at the forefront of cyclin research. Subsequently he cloned and characterised the first human cyclins with Tony Hunter. This was crucial to recognising that cyclins are conserved critical regulators of cell division. He provided the first evidence that there is a family of cyclin-dependent kinases by identifying the second Cdk, Cdk2, and identified the first link between cyclins and oncoproteins by showing that cyclin A bound to adenovirus E1A, thus linking cyclins to the E2F/Retinoblastoma pathway. These discoveries sparked intensive efforts by many laboratories. In leading his own group he has shown the importance of analysing both the spatial and temporal control of the cell cycle, pioneering fluorescence time-lapse microscopy to study the cell cycle. After discovering that mitotic cyclins localise to different sub-cellular compartments he showed how they dynamically specify their localisation. Recently, he discovered that the mitotic kinase, cyclin B1-Cdk1 is activated on centrosomes, and thereby prompted considerable interest in the role of the centrosome in initiating mitosis. He has developed a novel live-cell assay for proteolysis and uncovered new mechanisms by which cells control mitosis. His analyses have shown how ubiquitin-mediated proteolysis coordinates chromosome congression with cytokinesis and mitotic exit by degrading specific proteins at specific times.

Pines was elected a Fellow of the Royal Society (FRS) in 2016.
