= Alan Munro =

Alan Munro may refer to:

- Alan Munro (immunologist) (born 1937), British immunologist and entrepreneur
- Alan Munro (jockey) (born 1967), English flat racing jockey
- Alan Munro (politician) (1898–1968), member of the Queensland Legislative Assembly
