= Alan Munro (immunologist) =

British immunologist and entrepreneur (born 1937)

- Born: 1937 (age 88–89); Madras, India
- Education: University of Cambridge
- Known for: autoimmune system
- Scientific career
- Doctoral advisor: Asher Korner
- Doctoral students: Philippa Marrack

Alan James Munro (born 19 February 1937) is a British immunologist and entrepreneur who served as the Master of Christ's College, Cambridge (1995–2002).

== Early life and education ==
Munro was born in Madras, India to John Bennet Lorimer Munro, CB, CMG and his wife Gladys. He was educated at the Edinburgh Academy in Scotland. He attended the University of Cambridge, specialising in biochemistry. His PhD in the area of protein synthesis was supervised by Asher Korner at the Department of Biochemistry (1964).

== Career and research ==
His early posts were in the Cambridge biochemistry department (1963–68). His collaborators during this period include Tim Hunt. He joined the MRC Laboratory of Molecular Biology in Cambridge in 1968 to set up a cellular immunology programme. In 1971, he joined the Immunology Division of the Department of Pathology at the University of Cambridge. He spent sabbatical years at the Salk Institute, La Jolla, USA (1965–66) and University of Leiden, the Netherlands (1976–77). He became acting head of the Pathology Department in 1987.

His research interests during this period included the regulation of the immune response and the generation of therapeutic antibodies. He was instrumental in the early investigation of the Campath series of antibodies, which eventually resulted in the cancer treatment, alemtuzumab.

In 1988, Munro spent a sabbatical year working in the biotechnology company Celltech. He left the university in 1989 to co-found the highly successful Cambridge-based biotechnology company Immunology Ltd, later renamed Cantab Pharmaceuticals plc (now part of Celtic Pharma), specialising in therapeutic vaccines and immunotherapy, and he acted as its scientific director until 1995. He was also Chairman of Lorantis Ltd, another Cambridge-based immunology company.

He served as Master of Christ's College, Cambridge 1995–2002, being particularly active in establishing the college's fundraising campaign for the 2005 quincentenary.

As of 2006, Munro chairs the New Agents Committee of Cancer Research UK and holds non-executive directorships of Blackwell Publishing Ltd and Paradigm Therapeutics.

== Personal life ==
He married Mary Robertson in 1960. They have two sons: Sean Munro, FRS, is a cell biologist.

Academic offices
Preceded by Hans Kornberg	Master of Christ's College, Cambridge; 1995–2002	Succeeded by Malcolm Bowie
