= Interface Focus =

- Discipline: Interdisciplinary
- Language: English
- Edited by: Russell Foster

Publication details
- History: 2008–present
- Publisher: The Royal Society (United Kingdom)
- Frequency: Bi-monthly
- Open access: Hybrid
- Impact factor: 4 (2025)

Standard abbreviations
- ISO 4: Interface Focus

Indexing
- ISSN: 2042-8901
- OCLC no.: 712021929

Links
- Online access; Online archives

Interface Focus is the Royal Society's cross-disciplinary themed publication promoting research at the interface between the physical and life sciences. It is the sister journal to Journal of the Royal Society Interface with the main difference being that each issue of Interface Focus contains related articles based on a theme, which is guest edited by prominent researchers in a particular field.

Each Interface Focus themed issue is devoted to a specific subject at the interface of the physical sciences and life sciences. Formed of high-quality articles, each issue aims to facilitate cross-disciplinary research across this traditional divide by acting as a forum accessible to all. Topics may be newly emerging areas of research or dynamic aspects of more established fields. Organisers of each Interface Focus issue are strongly encouraged to contextualise the journal within their chosen subject.

According to the Journal Citation Reports, the journal has a 2025 impact factor of 4.

== Access ==
For three years Interface Focus was published as a supplement to Journal of the Royal Society Interface. As of January 2011 Interface Focus became an independent journal, published bi-monthly. Previous issues of Interface Focus are available to read free.
