= Nullius in verba =

Latin for "no one's words", as in "take nobody's word for it"; motto of the Royal Society

Coat of arms of the Royal Society with the motto Nullius in verba along the bottom

Nullius in verba (Latin for "no one's words" or "take nobody's word for it") is the motto of the Royal Society. John Evelyn and other fellows of the Royal Society chose the motto soon after the Society's founding in 1660.

== Meaning and etymology ==
The Royal Society website says that the motto is "an expression of the determination of Fellows to withstand the domination of authority and to verify all statements by an appeal to facts determined by experiment."

The phrase comes from Horace's Epistle (Book I, Epistle I) to his benefactor Maecenas, where he claims not to be devoted to any particular sect but is rather an eclectic by nature. The motto was extracted from the first of two hexameters, as indicated in bold:

Nullius addictus iurare in verba magistri, – quo me cumque rapit tempestas, deferor hospes.
(Not bound to swear by the words of a master; where the storm drives me I turn in for shelter.)

The minor planet known as 11059 Nulliusinverba in the asteroid belt is named after the expression. The phrase is also widely used and cited elsewhere.
