= Asher Korner =

British biochemist (1929–1971)

- Born: 5 February 1927
- Died: 22 September 1971 (aged 42)
- Resting place: Hoop Lane Jewish Cemetery
- Education: Trinity College, Cambridge
- Spouse: Shirley Ornstein Austin
- Children: Deborah; Simon; Joseph; Jessica
- Scientific career
- Workplaces: Clare College, Cambridge; University of Sussex
- Doctoral students: Tim Hunt; Anthony R. Hunter; Alan Munro

Asher Korner (5 February 1927 – 22 September 1971) was a British biochemist.

== Early life and education ==
"After service in the Royal Air Force he pursued an outstanding undergraduate career at Trinity College, Cambridge, holding first a senior scholarship and then a research scholarship. After obtaining a PhD in the department of biochemistry [1957] he held there a John Jaffe studentship of the Royal Society".

== Career and research ==
Korner became Director of Studies in Biochemistry at Clare College, Cambridge, where he was made a fellow in 1960 and served as a lecturer from 1960 to 1967. During this time, Korner supervised the PhD of the future Nobel laureate Tim Hunt. In 1967, Korner moved to the University of Sussex, where he became the university's first professor of biochemistry. His main field of interest was in the control of the synthesis of proteins and nucleic acids in the tissues of mammals, and in particular in the role played by hormones in this control.

== Awards and honours ==
Korner is commemorated at the University of Sussex through the Korner Travelling Fellowship Fund.

== Private life ==
Korner was born in Hackney, a son of Solomon Korner, a gown machinist salesman and Hetty (née Kerkland), a dressmaker. He married Shirley Ornstein Austin in Hendon in 1952. They had 4 children: Deborah (b. 1952), Simon (1957), Joseph (1960) and Jessica (1963).

Asher and Shirley Korner, who died 7 months apart, were buried in Hoop Lane Jewish Cemetery.
