= Viji Draviam =

Biologist

- Born: Viji Mythily Draviam
- Education: National Centre for Biological Sciences (BSc); University of Cambridge (PhD)
- Scientific career
- Fields: Cell biology Aneuploidy; Mitosis; Kinetochore; Spindle apparatus
- Workplaces: Queen Mary University of London; Harvard Medical School; Massachusetts Institute of Technology
- Thesis: Studies on human B- type cyclins (2002)
- Doctoral advisor: Jonathon Pines
- Website: www.draviamlab.uk

Viji Mythily Draviam is a Professor of Quantitative Cell and Molecular Biology at Queen Mary University of London. Her research considers the molecular level mechanisms that underpin cell division. Whilst working at Massachusetts Institute of Technology Draviam identified a process that caused the formation of tumours.

== Early life and education ==
Draviam earned a master's degree at the National Centre for Biological Sciences in Bangalore. She moved to the United Kingdom for her graduate studies, where she joined the University of Cambridge. She completed her PhD on B-type cyclins in the laboratory of Jonathon Pines at Trinity College, Cambridge.

== Research and career ==
Draviam moved to the United States for her postdoctoral research, spending in time in both the Harvard Medical School and Massachusetts Institute of Technology. Whilst at the Massachusetts Institute of Technology Draviam discovered one of the processes that caused tumours to form. Aneuploidy describes the situation where a cell contains an abnormal number of chromosomes, and often occurs in aggressive tumour cells. Before the work of Dravian it was known that checkpoint proteins work to limit abnormal cell division, but not clear why aneuploidy can still occur in cells with checkpoint proteins. Draviam demonstrated that checkpoint proteins may be unable to differentiate defective or normal cells, where the differences can be very small. She showed that checkpoint proteins have to 'sense' that both the adenomatous polyposis coli and EB1 proteins to support normal cell division. During her time at MIT Dravian founded CellCentives, a clinical science initiative to eradicate tuberculosis. In 2007 she proposed using mobile phones to remind people to improve their tuberculosis management.

Draviam returned to the United Kingdom in 2008, where she was made a Cancer Research UK Fellow and established her own research group. She moved to Queen Mary University of London in 2015 and was promoted to Professor of Cell And Molecular Biology in 2019. The Draviam laboratory investigate sub-cellular movements that are involved with maintaining chromosome number. They study kinetochore proteins through selective mutations and investigations using single molecule microscopy. Specifically, Draviam monitors chromosome microtubule attachment, end-on conversion, chromosome mis-segregation and how cells position spindles.

=== Selected publications ===
Her publications include:

- Timing and checkpoints in the regulation of mitotic progression
- The ch-TOG/XMAP215 protein is essential for spindle pole organization in human somatic cells
- Chromosome segregation and genomic stability

Draviam serves as an editor of the scientific journal PeerJ.
