= Mary Collins (immunologist) =

British immunologist

- Born: Mary Katharine Levinge Collins
- Education: University of Cambridge (BA); University of London (PhD)
- Known for: Development of lentivirus viral vectors
- Spouse: Sir Tim Hunt (m. 1995)
- Children: Two daughters, born c. 1994 and 1998
- Awards: FMedSci
- Scientific career
- Fields: Immunology
- Workplaces: Okinawa Institute of Science and Technology; Institute of Cancer Research; University College London; Queen Mary University of London
- Thesis: The mechanism of action of mitogens for cultured murine fibroblasts : regulation of mitogenic receptors and response (1983)
- Academic advisors: Enrique Rozengurt, Richard C. Mulligan
- Website: iris.ucl.ac.uk/iris/browse/profile?upi=MKLCO33

Mary Katharine Levinge Collins, Lady Hunt is a British Professor of virology and the director of the Queen Mary University of London Blizard Institute. She served as Provost at the Okinawa Institute of Science and Technology in Japan. Formerly, Collins taught in the Division of Infection and Immunity at University College London, and was the head of the Division of Advanced Therapies at the National Institute for Biological Standards and Control, and the Director of the Medical Research Council Centre for Medical Molecular Virology. Her research group studies the use of viruses as vectors for introducing new genes into cells, which can be useful for experimental cell biology, for clinical applications such as gene therapy, and as cancer vaccines.

== Education ==
Collins was born in Reading, England and grew up in Cheltenham Spa, attending Cheltenham Ladies' College as a day girl. She won an entrance scholarship to Clare College, Cambridge, where she studied Natural Sciences (Biochemistry). She did her postgraduate research work supervised by Enrique Rozengurt at the Imperial Cancer Research Fund for which she was awarded a PhD by the University of London in 1983.

== Career and research ==
After her PhD, she moved to a postdoctoral fellowship with Avrion Mitchison at University College London studying the locations of T cell receptor gene clusters, and next worked with Richard C. Mulligan at the Whitehead Institute at the Massachusetts Institute of Technology, where she developed retroviral vectors expressing cytokines and cytokine receptors.

Collins started her research group in 1987 at the Institute of Cancer Research in London and moved in 1997 to University College London, where she has since held a variety of leadership positions. She served as the head of UCL Immunology & Molecular Pathology from 2000 to 2007, became Director of the Medical Research Council Centre for Medical Molecular Virology in 2005, became Director of the UCL Division of Infection & Immunity in 2003, and served as the Dean of the Faculty of Life Sciences between 2009 and 2014. She stepped down as dean to become the head of the Division of Advanced Therapies at the National Institute for Biological Standards and Control.

Collins was among the prominent UCL women scientists featured in a series of interviews published by the MRC in celebration of International Women's Day in 2011 and was one of two UCL women to participate in a women in science event in collaboration with Central Saint Martins College of Art and Design in 2012. In December 2015, it was announced that Professor Collins would become Dean of Research at the Okinawa Institute of Technology. Forbes Magazine speculated that she would supervise of $110m in Japanese government funding at the Institute. She was appointed Provost in 2018 and lead the University's response to the COVID-19 pandemic.

In October 2022, she returned to London to take up the post of Director of the Blizard Institute, Queen Mary University of London.

Collins' research group studies the use of viruses, particularly lentiviruses (the group to which the human immunodeficiency virus belongs), as vectors for delivering novel genes to cells and as platforms for the development of vaccines. Because lentiviruses like HIV specifically infect immune cells called T-cells, a genetically engineered inactivated version of the virus can be used to deliver immunogenic proteins to T-cells to induce an immune response. This system has been studied successfully in laboratory mice.

== Awards and honours ==
Collins was elected a Fellow of the Academy of Medical Sciences (FMedSci)in 1999.

She won the Suffrage Science award in 2011.

== Personal ==
Collins married Tim Hunt in 1995, who was awarded the Nobel Prize in Physiology or Medicine in 2001, and knighted in 2006. They have two children.
