= Anthony R. Hunter =

British-American biologist (born 1943)

Tony Hunter
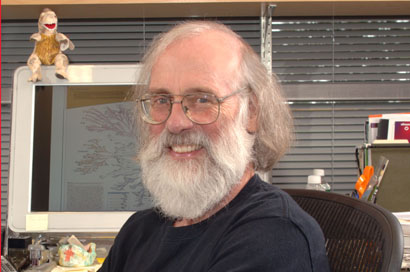
- Anthony Rex Hunter
- Born: Anthony Rex Hunter; 23 August 1943 (age 83); United Kingdom
- Education: Felsted School; University of Cambridge (PhD)
- Known for: Kinases
- Awards: FRS (1987); Charles S. Mott Prize (1994); Keio Medical Science Prize (2001); Louisa Gross Horwitz Prize (2004); Wolf Prize in Medicine (2005); BBVA Foundation Frontiers of Knowledge Award (2014); The Sjöberg Prize (2017); Tang Prize (2018); Albany Medical Center Prize (2026)
- Scientific career
- Fields: Biology
- Workplaces: Salk Institute; University of California San Diego
- Thesis: Aspects of mammalian protein synthesis (1969)
- Doctoral advisor: Asher Korner
- Notable students: Jonathon Pines (postdoc)
- Website: www.salk.edu/scientist/tony-hunter/

Anthony Rex Hunter (born 23 August 1943) is a British-American biologist who is a professor of biology at the Salk Institute for Biological Studies and the University of California San Diego. His research publications list his name as Tony Hunter.

Professor Hunter is an elected member of the UK's Royal Society and the USA's National Academy of Sciences.

== Early life and education ==
Hunter was born in 1943 in the United Kingdom and educated at Felsted School, prior to Christ's College, Cambridge, where he was awarded a PhD in 1969 for research on protein synthesis.

== Career and research ==
Following his PhD, Hunter held a fellowship at Christ's College, Cambridge, in Cambridge (1968–1971) and (1973–1975). From 1971 to 1973, he was a postdoctoral research associate of the Salk Institute for Biological Studies in La Jolla, California. He was then assistant professor 1975–78, associate professor 1978–82, professor 1982 onwards and since 2008 director of the Salk Institute Cancer Center. He also sits on the Selection Committee for Life Science and Medicine which chooses winners of the Shaw Prize.

Hunter is one of the foremost recognized leaders in the field of cell growth control, growth factor receptors and their signal transduction pathways. He is well known for discovering that tyrosine phosphorylation is a fundamental mechanism for transmembrane-signal transduction in response to growth factor stimulation and that disregulation of such tyrosine phosphorylation, by activated oncogenic protein tyrosine kinases, is a pivotal mechanism utilized in the malignant transformation of cells. His work is important in signaling pathways and their disorders.

Hunter was a founder of Signal Pharmaceuticals.

== Awards and honors ==
He won the Wolf Prize in Medicine in 2005 for "the discovery of protein kinases that phosphorylate tyrosine residues in proteins, critical for the regulation of a wide variety of cellular events, including malignant transformation". He has been granted along with Charles Sawyers and Joseph Schlessinger with the 2014 BBVA Foundation Frontiers of Knowledge Award in the Biomedicine category for "carving out the path that led to the development of a new class of successful cancer drugs".

- 1987 Fellow of the Royal Society (FRS)
- 1994 Charles S. Mott Prize by the General Motors Cancer Research Foundation.
- 1994 Gairdner Foundation International Award.
- 1998 Member of the US National Academy of Sciences.
- 2001 Keio Medical Science Prize
- 2004 Louisa Gross Horwitz Prize from Columbia University.
- 2005 Wolf Prize in Medicine
- 2006 Pasarow Award in Cancer Research.
- 2014 Royal Medal
- 2014 BBVA Foundation Frontiers of Knowledge Award in Biomedicine
- 2017 Sjöberg Prize for Cancer Research
- 2018 Tang Prize
- 2018 Pezcoller Foundation-AACR International Award for Cancer Research
- 2026 Albany Medical Center Prize
