= Open Biology =

- Discipline: Natural sciences
- Language: English
- Edited by: Jonathon Pines

Publication details
- History: 2011–present
- Publisher: Royal Society (United Kingdom)
- Frequency: Continuous
- Open access: Yes
- License: CC-BY 4.0
- Impact factor: 3.1 (2025)

Standard abbreviations
- ISO 4: Open Biol.

Indexing
- CODEN: OBPICQ
- ISSN: 2046-2441
- OCLC no.: 758836335

Links
- Journal homepage; Online access; Online archive

Open Biology is a peer-reviewed open access scientific journal published by the Royal Society covering biology at the molecular and cellular levels. The first issue was published in September 2011 with an editorial about the launch of the journal. The editor-in-chief is Jonathon Pines (The Institute of Cancer Research) who was appointed in 2020.

== Contents and themes ==
The journal publishes research articles, reviews, invited perspectives, commentaries, comments, and invited replies.

== Abstracting and indexing ==
The journal is abstracted and indexed in the Science Citation Index Expanded, BIOSIS Previews, Scopus, and Index Medicus/MEDLINE/PubMed. According to the Journal Citation Reports, the journal has a 2025 impact factor of 3.1.
