= Royal Society Open Science =

- Discipline: Natural sciences
- Language: English
- Edited by: Wendy Hall

Publication details
- History: 2014–present
- Publisher: Royal Society (United Kingdom)
- Frequency: Upon acceptance
- Open access: Yes
- Impact factor: 3 (2025)

Standard abbreviations
- ISO 4: R. Soc. Open Sci.

Indexing
- ISSN: 2054-5703

Links
- Journal homepage

Royal Society Open Science is a peer-reviewed, open access scientific journal published by the Royal Society since September 2014. Its launch was announced in February 2014. It covers all scientific fields, operates objective peer review and publishes articles which are scientifically sound, leaving any judgement of impact to the reader. As of 2022, the editor-in-chief, Wendy Hall, is supported by a team of subject editors and associate editors. Commissioning and peer review for the chemistry section of the journal is managed by the Royal Society of Chemistry. The journal offers Registered Reports across all subject disciplines, and Replications as a formal article type in the Psychology and Cognitive Neuroscience Section (as of 2019), though the journal welcomes replications in other disciplines, too. In 2021, the journal launched a new 'Science, Society and Policy' section of the journal.

Articles published in Royal Society Open Science are regularly covered in the mainstream media, such as BBC News and The Independent.

The journal is indexed by a number of services, including PubMed, PubMed Central, Scopus, the Directory of Open Access Journals (DOAJ) and the Astrophysics Data System. The journal has been awarded a DOAJ Seal, demonstrating its commitment to best practice in open access publishing.

After an article is accepted, authors must pay an article processing charge to see the article published. The fee, as of January 2024, is GBP 1400, or USD 1960, or EUR 1680. The journal offers a number of article processing charge waivers.
