= Journal of the Royal Society Interface =

- Discipline: Interdisciplinary
- Language: English
- Edited by: Richard Cogdell

Publication details
- History: 2004–present
- Publisher: The Royal Society (United Kingdom)
- Frequency: Monthly
- Open access: Hybrid
- Impact factor: 3.4 (2025)

Standard abbreviations
- ISO 4: J. R. Soc. Interface

Indexing
- CODEN: JRSICU
- ISSN: 1742-5662
- OCLC no.: 711051718

Links
- Journal homepage; Online access

The Journal of the Royal Society Interface is a monthly peer-reviewed scientific journal covering the interface between the life sciences and the physical sciences, including chemistry, engineering, materials science, mathematics, and physics. The editor-in-chief is Richard Cogdell (University of Glasgow). The journal was established in 2004 and is published by the Royal Society.

== Abstracting and indexing ==
The journal is abstracted and indexed in the Chemical Abstracts Service, Science Citation Index, BIOSIS Previews, Current Contents/Life Sciences, The Zoological Record, Scopus, and Index Medicus/MEDLINE/PubMed.
