= Prisoner transport =

Transportation of imprisoned persons

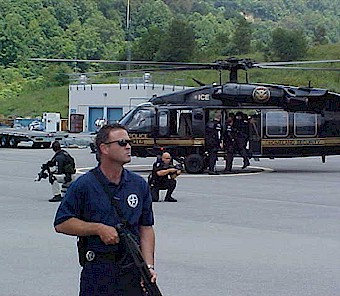
United States Marshals securing an immigration and customs prisoner transport.

Prisoner transport is the transportation of prisoners from one secure location to another. It may be carried out by law enforcement agencies or private contractors such as Prisoner Transportation Services.

To extradite a suspected or convicted criminal from one jurisdiction to another, a rendition aircraft may be used, although the high cost involved means that it is normally used only to transport the most dangerous of prisoners; more commonly, a person convicted of a non violent crime with low risk of escape would be put onto a commercial airliner, albeit escorted by law enforcement officers. One notable example of a prisoner transported on a commercial airliner was that of Christopher Tappin, a Briton extradited to the United States in February 2012 to face American charges of selling arms parts to Iran. Tappin was flown on United Airlines flights from London Heathrow Airport to El Paso, Texas via Houston accompanied, but not handcuffed, by US Marshals at all times.

== Risks ==
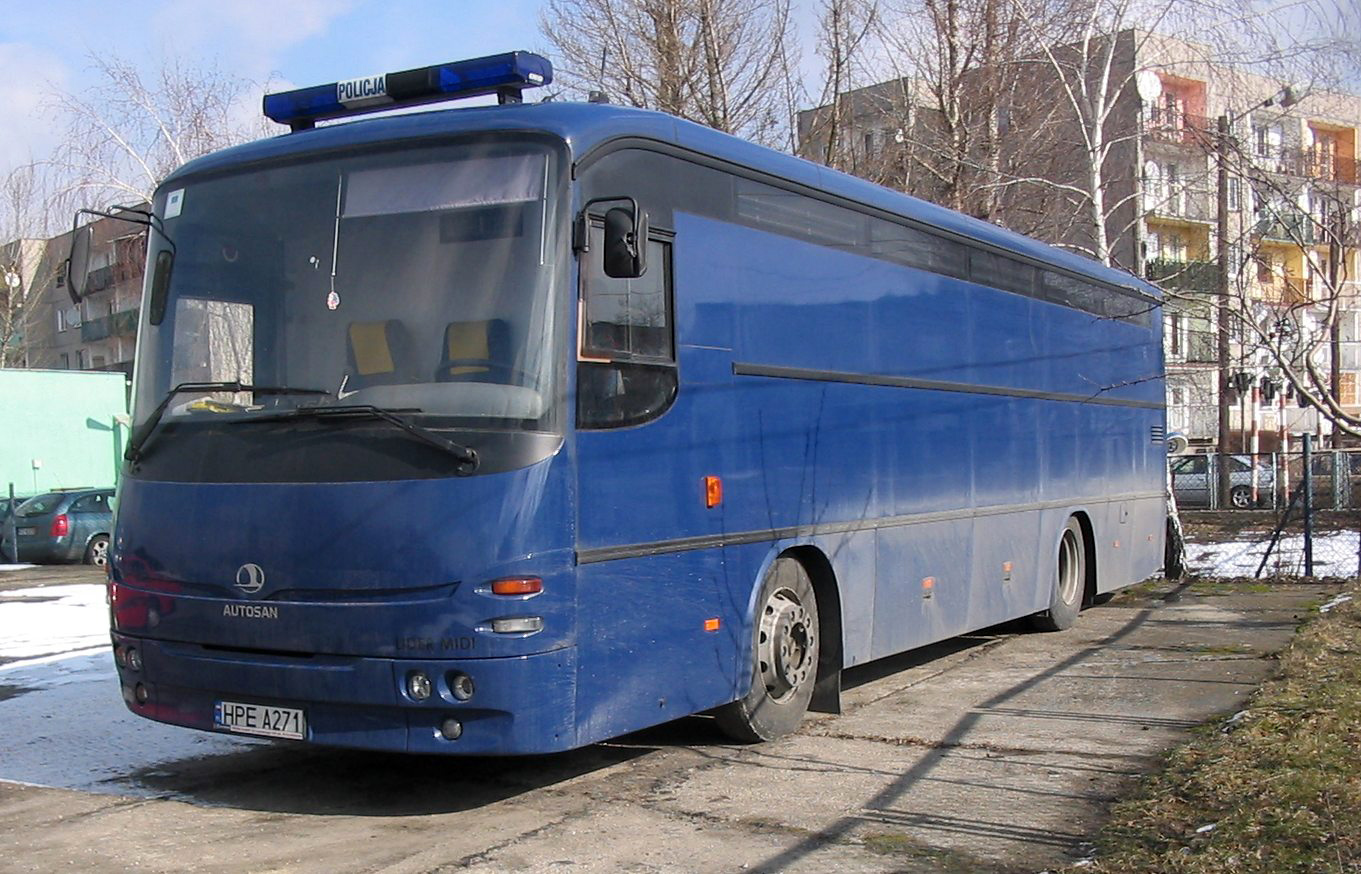
Polish police coach used for prisoner transport.

Prisoner transport is risky due to the fact that dangerous inmates are temporarily introduced into a public environment. Specially-designed prisoner transport vehicles are used to fulfill security requirements. Many inmates see this time as an opportunity to escape. Some inmates prepare for escape during transport by bringing along tiny objects (e.g. paper clips) that can be used to pick the locks of their handcuffs prior to escape from the vehicles.

Law enforcement agencies, aware of this, often take extra security measures on inmates being transported, especially those who are more prone to escape or violence. This includes additional forms of restraint on the bodies, more secure vehicles, and escorts from additional law enforcement agents. Many transports are started at night to minimize the chance of harm to civilians.

== Outfitting ==
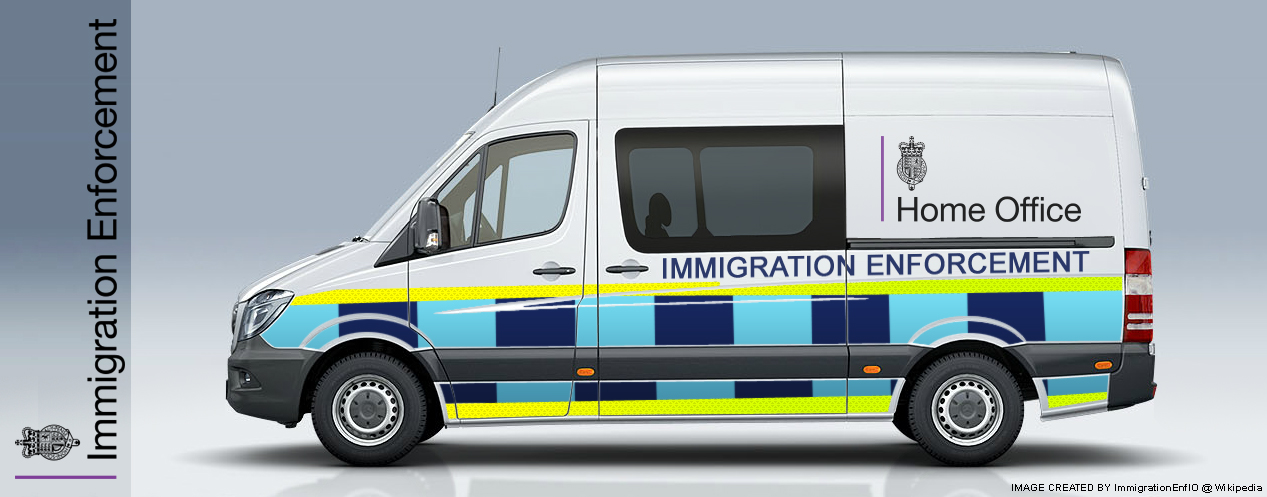
A Cell Van used by UK Immigration Enforcement to transport alleged offenders

As a safeguard against escape, prisoners are routinely placed in physical restraints for transport. The type of restraints used depends on the security level of the prisoners and may vary from department to department. As a rule, most prisoners will have to wear at least handcuffs as a minimum restraint. Often, a belly chain is added so that the prisoner's hands are shackled to the waist. Leather or nylon belts may be used instead of belly chains. To prevent the prisoner from manipulating the keyhole of the handcuffs, for instance if they get hold of a handcuff key or a lockpick, a handcuff cover may be placed around the handcuffs. The additional precaution of leg irons may also be taken, particularly if the prisoner will be walking outside of a secure area. When a prisoner is shackled at their hands, legs, and around their waist, this is commonly known as being placed in "full restraints".

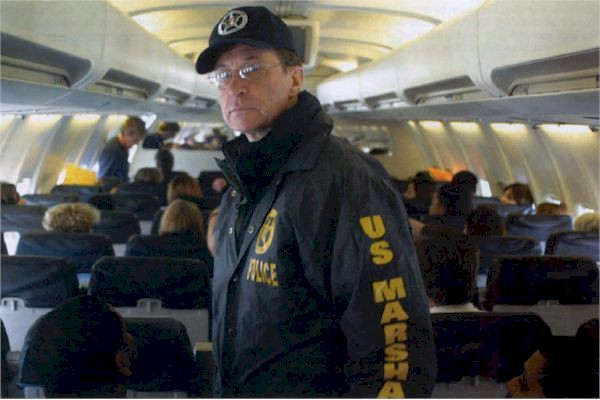
US Marshals and prisoners onboard a Con Air flight

Specific prisoner transport restraints (e.g. Smith & Wesson model 1850 "transport restraint") are combinations which consist of a pair of handcuffs, attached by a longer chain to a pair of leg irons. When being placed in such transport restraints, the prisoner will still have the possibility to manage normal steps, but is prevented from running by the leg irons. The connecting chain also prevents the prisoner from lifting their arms. For transporting prisoners by car, special combinations called auto restraints are used where the chains of the leg irons as well as the connecting chains are shortened, allowing the prisoner only a stooping shuffling walk when they are outside the car.

In addition to restraints, a stun belt may be fastened around the prisoner's waist for further control. In the event of the prisoner attempting to escape or attack someone, the escorting officers can activate the belt via a remote control to give the subject an electric shock.

=== Clothing ===
When being transported, prisoners will in most cases have to wear a prison uniform to make them instantly identifiable. Sometimes, special high-visibility jackets are added for enhanced security.

== See also ==
- Penal transportation
- Corrections officer
- Justice Prisoner Air Transportation System
- Federal Marshals in the United States
- Prisoner Transportation Services
- Sheriff
- United States Marshals Service
- Bailiffs in Ontario
