= Prisoner Transportation Services =

US privately-held company

Prisoner Transportation Services is a privately held company that moves prisoners from one jurisdiction to another in the United States. Established in 2001, it is based in Nashville, Tennessee and headed by Joel Brasfield. It was the largest such firm in the United States and it transports more than 100,000 persons each year. The firm's subsidiaries include U.S. Prisoner Transport and U.S. Corrections. The companies operate prisoner transport vehicles ranging in size from four-person automobiles to buses that can transport thirty-five people.

Since 2012, at least five people have died on private extradition vans operated by Prisoner Transportation Services, leading to a Justice Department investigation. An April 2018 lawsuit filed against the company alleges negligence, intentional infliction of emotional distress, and violation of 14th Amendment rights by a detainee held in a Prisoner Transportation Services van for 18 consecutive days.

== See also ==
- Incarceration in the United States
