= Death of Kelly Savage =

Former Assistant Language Teacher in Japan

Kelly Robert Savage
- Born: December 27, 1989; Reno, Nevada, US
- Died: May 17, 2017 (aged 27); Yamato, Kanagawa Prefecture, Japan
- Education: Victoria University of Wellington, New Zealand (BA)
- Occupation: Assistant Language Teacher
- Parent(s): Martha Kane Savage and Michael Leonard Savage

Kelly Robert Savage (27 December 1989 – 17 May 2017) was a New Zealand-American Assistant Language Teacher living in Japan whose death sparked an international outcry and a national debate in Japan about their psychiatric system and its use of long-term physical restraints. Savage was a dual citizen of New Zealand and the United States, and worked in Shibushi, Kagoshima, Japan, from August 2015 until his death in May 2017.

== Background ==
Kelly Robert Savage was born on 27 December, 1989, in Reno, Nevada, United States, to parents Michael Leonard Savage and Martha Kane Savage. He had a brother, Patrick Evan Savage, and was the grandson of physicist Evan O'Neill Kane. Savage moved with his family to Wellington, New Zealand, and became a New Zealand citizen, but still retained his US citizenship.

At high school in Onslow College, Savage developed an interest in Japanese culture and language. While an undergraduate at the Victoria University of Wellington, Savage began suffering from depression and was hospitalized for five weeks in 2012 as a result of a psychotic episode. Savage graduated from the university with a Bachelor of Arts in May 2015, double majoring in psychology and Japanese.

In August 2015, Savage started a position teaching English as an Assistant Language Teacher with the Japanese Exchange and Teaching (JET) programme in the city of Shibushi, Kagoshima Prefecture. He was reported to have been loved by his students and fellow teachers.

== Death ==
In early 2017, Savage began taking his psychiatric medicine irregularly, and in April 2017, psychotic symptoms began reappearing. He took medical leave to visit his brother in Yokohama City, but his symptoms worsened considerably and he stopped taking all medication and began acting erratically. He entered a manic psychotic state and was compulsorily admitted to a psychiatric hospital, Yamato Hospital, in Kanagawa Prefecture on 30 April.

Savage was not reported as having harmed himself or anybody else, and did not exhibit severe symptoms upon arriving at the hospital. Nonetheless, on admission, he was tied to his bed with restraints on both wrists, both ankles, and the waist. Savage's family was not allowed to visit from 3 to 7 May because it was the Golden Week holiday and there were not enough personnel to allow for family visits. After ten days spent nearly continuously in restraints, Savage's breathing and heartbeat suddenly stopped. CPR was administered until he could be transferred to Yamato City Hospital, a general hospital. At the hospital his heart was started, and he was put on life support. However, he had severe brain damage and never regained consciousness. Savage was pronounced dead on 17 May. A cardiologist at the hospital wrote in a report “To speculate, given that he was restrained for 10 days, we should consider the possibility that he developed deep vein thrombosis (DVT) at some point and this led to a pulmonary embolism” and cardiac arrest.

Memorial services for Savage were held in Japan, as well as at Victoria University of Wellington on 29 July.

== Initial response ==
Savage's family contacted Yamato City Hospital, asking them to provide his medical records, and asked the hospital to investigate their prolonged use of restraints. The hospital did not acknowledge any wrongdoing and initially refused to provide the medical records. As a result, Savage's family turned to the media and the New Zealand Ministry of Foreign Affairs and Trade (MFAT). The family also met with Toshio Hasegawa, Professor of Health Sciences at Kyorin University, who had published a book about the use of restraints in Japan. Hasegawa helped to set up a press conference with the Japanese media in Tokyo on 19 July 2017. He also started a group to lobby for stronger limitations on the use of restraints in psychiatric care.

Prior to the press conference in Japan, reporters from the New Zealand Herald and Radio New Zealand broke the story in New Zealand on July 13. On July 14, the first article in Japan about the incident was published in Kyodo News, an English language newspaper. By July 20, several major international news outlets had picked up on the story, including Reuters the Associated Press, The Guardian, and SBS News. High-profile journals in Japan including the Japan Times, Yomiuri Shimbun and Asahi Shimbun published accounts of the tragedy.

== Later developments ==
The New Zealand MFAT requested, on the family's behalf, for the Japanese Ministry of Health, Labour and Welfare to ask Yamato City Hospital to supply the family with the relevant medical records. The hospital records were reported as being contradictory, alternating between stating that Savage was calm, and in a state of duress that justified restraints. In 2021, the Ministry of Health, Labour and Welfare published the results of an investigation they had promised into the use of restraints in Japanese hospital settings. However, no external investigation was conducted into Savage's death, despite repeated requests by his family.

The event led to an increased discussion about the psychiatric use of restraints within Japan. Yomiuri Shimbun wrote an article on 10 August, highlighting Savage's death as an example of the failure of the self-reporting component of Japan's medical accident investigation system. They followed it with further articles about the case and about international comparisons. In June 2019, NHK, the Japanese national television station, ran a 29-minute documentary about Kelly Savage and how New Zealand psychiatric institutions care for patients without mechanical restraints.

On 15 November 2017, a 28-year-old Japanese man was found dead while he was restrained in a psychiatric hospital, and it was reported in Asahi Shimbun along with a reminder about Savage's case. In 2018, three new cases of wrongful use of restraints were publicised in Japan when family members or victims themselves sued hospitals.

In November 2018, Savage's family presented a letter to Japan's Ministry of Health, Labour and Welfare signed by 31 leading psychiatrists from around the world, asking them to convene an international panel to investigate the issue of psychiatric care in Japan's hospitals. The World Psychiatric Association responded to this letter by starting a Taskforce on Minimising Coercion in Mental Health Care, which was renamed in 2020 to the "Working Group on Implementing Alternatives to Coercion in Mental Health Care". Japan's Ministry of Health, Labor and Welfare annually surveys psychiatric hospitals to determine how many patients are being restrained or kept in solitary confinement. Martha Savage's campaign against the use of restraints in Japan saw the number of people restrained drop 9 percent between 2017 and 2018, which was only the second time that number had dropped since 2003.

On 17 May 2019, Susan Strongman of Radio New Zealand published a long-form article about Savage's death and collaborated in a 10-minute video documentary about Kelly and the Japanese psychiatric system, called Death Bed: The story of Kelly Savage. The videographer, Luke McPake, won the 2020 Voyager Media Award for Best Feature or Current Affairs Video (single video journalist).

== UN Universal Periodic Review ==
The United Nations (UN) Human Rights Council conducts Universal Periodic Reviews (UPRs) of each member nation every five years. Japan was reviewed on 14 November 2017 in Geneva. The UPR report included concerns from New Zealand and several other countries about Japan's psychiatric care system and their treatment of people with disabilities. After the review, the New Zealand government discussed their concerns with the Japanese Embassy. The 2022 review also notes concerns about restraints.
