= Martha Savage =

New Zealand geologist

Martha Kane Savage
- Education: University of Wisconsin-Madison
- Scientific career
- Fields: Geology / seismology
- Workplaces: Victoria University of Wellington
- Thesis: Spectral properties of Hawaiian microearthquakes : source, site, and attenuation effects (1987)

Martha Kane Savage is a New Zealand geology academic, and as of 2018, is a full professor at the Victoria University of Wellington.

== Academic career ==
After an undergraduate degree at Swarthmore College and a 1987 PhD thesis titled 'Spectral properties of Hawaiian microearthquakes : source, site, and attenuation effects' at the University of Wisconsin--Madison, she moved to the Victoria University of Wellington, rising to full professor.

Savage was elected a Fellow of the Royal Society of New Zealand in 2013 and a Fellow of the American Geophysical Union in 2015. As part of her fieldwork, Savage has over-wintered at the South Pole.

In 2017, Savage was selected as one of the Royal Society Te Apārangi's "150 women in 150 words", celebrating the contributions of women to knowledge in New Zealand.

She was awarded the 2020 New Zealand Association of Scientists Marsden Medal. The citation reads "Professor Martha Savage has been awarded the 2020 Marsden Medal for her pathbreaking research in the fields of seismology, plate tectonics and volcanology, as well as her distinguished record of service to New Zealand and the global scientific community. In her pioneering work, Prof Savage used remotely sensed texture—seismic anisotropy—of rocks deep below Earth’s surface to fundamentally change how plate-boundary processes are studied and understood. The observations at the heart of her work, separation of seismic waves into components that travel at slightly different speeds, are due to rock textures and once detected, those textures reveal how tectonic plates move and respond to stresses built up within them. She has conducted comparative studies of deep crustal properties and processes in New Zealand and the western United States, investigated the relationship between time-varying anisotropy and volcanic eruption sequences, and developed new observational approaches and new computational methods to interpret seismic data. Her work showcases New Zealand as a rich natural laboratory in which to develop globally relevant geophysical methods and process understanding. Prof Savage was also a pathbreaker as the second woman to winter-over in Antarctica. Her Antarctic work was focused on cosmic-ray observations at Amundsen–Scott South Pole Station, but she credits it to have also allowed her to learn about the importance of personal character and positive, supportive relationships in science. Professor Savage has a distinguished record of service, to New Zealand and the global scientific community, through review panels, advisory boards, editorial boards and mentorship. She is a Fellow of the Royal Society of New Zealand and is the first New Zealand woman to have been elected Fellow of the American Geophysical Union."

== Personal life ==
In 2017, Savage's son Kelly died in a Japanese hospital after being restrained for 10 days, and she has since campaigned for an end to the practice.

== Selected works ==
- Savage, M. K. (1999). "Seismic anisotropy and mantle deformation: What have we learned from shear wave splitting?". Reviews of Geophysics. 37 (1): 65–106. Bibcode:1999RvGeo..37...65S. doi:10.1029/98RG02075.
- Silver, Paul G.; Savage, Martha K. (1994). "The Interpretation of Shear-Wave Splitting Parameters in the Presence of Two Anisotropic Layers". Geophysical Journal International. 119 (3): 949–963. Bibcode:1994GeoJI.119..949S. doi:10.1111/j.1365-246X.1994.tb04027.x.
- Savage, Martha Kane (1998). "Lower crustal anisotropy or dipping boundaries? Effects on receiver functions and a case study in New Zealand". Journal of Geophysical Research: Solid Earth. 103 (B7): 15069–15087. Bibcode:1998JGR...10315069S. doi:10.1029/98JB00795.
- Anderson, John G., James N. Brune, John N. Louie, Yuehua Zeng, Martha Savage, Guang Yu, Qingbin Chen, and Diane dePolo. "Seismicity in the western Great Basin apparently triggered by the Landers, California, earthquake, 28 June 1992." Bulletin of the Seismological Society of America 84, no. 3 (1994): 863–891.
- Savage, Martha Kane; Silver, Paul G. (1993). "Mantle deformation and tectonics: Constraints from seismic anisotropy in the western United States". Physics of the Earth and Planetary Interiors. 78 (3–4): 207–227. Bibcode:1993PEPI...78..207S. doi:10.1016/0031-9201(93)90156-4.
