= Female prison officers =

Women have served as prison and correctional officers since the early 19th century in London. The focus of research on female correctional officers has mostly been comparatively discussing the male officers' experience versus the female officer's experience. A number of studies are extensions of interviews or surveys solely of corrections staff and commonly emphasize employment opportunities and working conditions with an inclusion of legal and social obstacles, such as differing types of discrimination, that female officers face on a regular basis, in their respective field. Increased interest in the distinction of gender for workers in correctional facilities has some relevance to the shift in this occupation being predominantly male-dominated to, in some cases, being more female-dominated. The increase in the number of females working in this field is mainly due to helping alleviate staff shortages and providing women seeking employment with more opportunities to work in the correctional system.

== History ==
For a long time, a majority of female correctional officers were working exclusively with female inmates due to the work of Elizabeth Fry and other rehabilitation volunteers in the early 1800s in London. These volunteers were religious, conservative women with comfortable economic backgrounds, who isolated themselves from men in order to provide female convicts with a safe environment to feel comfortable in.

Mary Weed was the first female warden in 1793. Shortly after this time, the first female correctional officer was appointed in America in 1822.

== Experiences and discrimination in the workplace ==
Holistically, the concept of women working in the correctional work space is perceived negatively by society. Generalized theories held by the public and politicians make powerful resistance for these perceptions to change. These conceptions range from women being useless in disrupting inmate altercations due to their smaller size in comparison to men, less mental capability of handling hardships of the male-dominated correctional field, coercion into relationships with other male or female inmates or fellow guards, causing additional problems for the other staff members. Female correctional officers have different experiences working in correctional prison facilities depending on policies and their relationships in the workplace.

=== Superior-to-guard ===
Though correctional officers have limited interactions with their superiors as opposed to their coworkers, they still have a huge effect on their experiences. The assignments that superiors give out are usually gendered, and show a clear division between men's work and women's work in the facility. Since privacy rights place restrictions on certain assignments women are allowed to do in male prisons, this can be used as an excuse for limitations in women's workload and deployment.

Britton found that discretion in distribution of work for prison officers was greater in state versus federal prisons, because state officials make significant decisions rather than elected representatives. Female prison officers are less likely to be assigned to jobs that were considered unsafe because of the influence of the association of masculinity with physical stature. These positions typically involve a lot of contact with inmates who were perceived as more violent than others. Instead female officers can be assigned to visitation and control areas, or even assigned secretarial desk-jobs. While some female officers accept this "protection", others resent it and realize that they commonly receive weaker evaluations and less opportunities for upward mobility and promotion in the correctional field.

=== Guard-to-guard ===
Female corrections officers experience more hostility from male coworkers than they do from male prisoners. Many researchers have found that male officers are most concerned over the issue of female officers becoming too friendly with inmates, causing them to treat these officers poorly. Male officers fear that female officers will threaten the security of their facility by having inappropriate relations with inmates, or gathering unfair promotions by granting sexual favours to their superiors. Female correctional staff are viewed as "tokens, sex objects and as inferior" by their male coworkers. When these women work in an all-male maximum security setting, this attitude increases substantially, giving room for more discrimination from male correctional officers to their female counterparts. In similar research, female officers were more inclined to make complaints about coworkers as opposed to the inmates that they guarded, and the highest percentage of problem complaints were towards male officers of comparable rank and position. This, as a result, causes a gender-like tolerance dynamic, where female corrections staff are much more tolerant of their own gender of officers than male officers in the same institution and vice versa.

=== Inmate-to-guard ===
Title VII allows female correctional officers to supervise both male and female inmates, unless they are nude for prolonged periods of time, or have to come in contact with male genitalia. Inmates have varying levels of respect and receptiveness for their female guards. Depending on how the female guard is perceived by the group of inmates, they are either respected or disrespected as a whole. Although some inmates may respect their female guards, some do wish that female guards were not present to tempt their sexual desires. There are also inmates that feel as though females working in correctional facilities should be kept to a minimum because their positive impact is diminished by their potential to create conflict (usually sexual). Men in the incarceration system feel shameful and vulnerable, and they feel that one way to reduce these negative feeling surrounding their current state, female guarding should be kept to a minimum, as female guards can sometimes be seen as threatening to the manhood of male inmates.

With more contact, inmate perceptions of officers can either be more positive or more negative. If offenders are required to interact appropriately and respectfully with the women guarding them, they have more potential to see females in power more confidently and have better attitudes towards them. Inmates may be able to stop viewing female correctional officers as weak and incapable of doing their jobs effectively, and see them, instead, as strong women. As much as privacy and sexual assault can be cause for concern, a majority of inmates (interviewed for a study) that had been supervised by a female indicated little sexual temptation or frustration, no invasion of privacy, and no resentment or stripping of manhood from having to take orders from female guards. Since women are seen as "softer" in demeanor and intervention style than men, many inmates actually prefer female guards over their male counterparts. Depending on the nature of the guard-to-inmate interactions, there can be negative repercussions as well. If the interaction is not a positive one, it may cause more tension between them. Older inmates also find frustration in female guarding, because they are not used to it. Female officer number counts are on the rise, but they were not always that way. The elder inmates tend to resent changes made to the gender of the staff members in their facilities.

Inmate perceptions of female officers are dependent on the length of their sentencing, as well. Among minimum, medium, and maximum custody inmates, inmates with shorter sentences (usually minimum sentences) are more likely to have negative perceptions about the competency and ability of female officers to do their job effectively and efficiently than medium and maximum- sentenced inmates. These findings may be due to the fact that inmates with longer sentences have been or will be in prison for a longer period of time with little-to-no outside interactions, therefore, they appreciate female interactions more.

The race of the inmates may be relevant to whether or not they appreciate the presence of female officers in correctional facilities. Close-custody inmates, who are usually non-white, enjoy and welcome female presence and are pleased with their competency levels and how well they do their jobs. One explanation is that men of color in the incarceration system have a higher prevalence of being raised by a strong female disciplinarian over a male figure. Because of this, they may be more likely to respect a female authority figure.

=== Harassment ===
Issues of harassment have high prevalence in correctional facilities. Many inmates still "haze" new female officers by staring at them in uncomfortable ways for prolonged periods of time and making suggestive remarks and expressions. Women officers usually restrain from disclosing information about the harassment they face in fear of its effects on the environment of their workplace or its repercussions on their job.

Being a correctional officer puts females in a position of power as well as vulnerability, making them more inclined to abuse that power. In addition to being seen as victims of harassment, they are also seen as perpetrators as well. Female correctional officers make up about sixty-one percent of sexual misconduct among staff and twenty-one percent of staff harassment. There are also reports stating that sixty-nine percent of jail and prison inmates report victimization with female staff members as the perpetrators.

== Coping strategies ==
=== Presentation of self ===
Constructed situation-specific gender roles form salient role identity, by which individuals are perceived and reacted to. Attractiveness is no marker for whether or not female presence in correctional facilities is appreciated. Female prison officers are known to use different strategies to present themselves in ways that can be beneficial or perhaps sometimes detrimental to the receptiveness of their coworkers and/or their inmates as well.

==== Normative-feminine presentation ====
The normative-feminine presentation is the best received presentation out of the various that are used. This presentation is the stereotypically feminine type that women are expected to present. Those who actively participate in this presentation of self are generally less aggressive, have longer hair, smile more often, have softer voices, are more nurturing and have less-muscled bodies. They handle altercations in a calmer, more relaxed fashion as well. They usually see common, positive results amongst their inmates. Depending on the guard, they can attract inmates in a negative manner as well. Female guards may not feel comfortable with the interactions that they have with other inmates at times, as well as they may not feel comfortable with the way any of their interactions may be perceived when performing this way. It also has potential to cause problems with other male guards, because they do not appreciate "prisoner-friendly" guards, in fear that they are being too soft, ruining the masculine, dominant dynamic of the prisons. This may cause male guards to turn against these types of female guards, or treat them disrespectfully. As a result, the more alienated female guards feel, the more likely that they will take part in inappropriate relations with inmates, become hyper-masculine, or quit. There are many benefits to this presentation style, some guards may feel uncomfortable displaying themselves this way and end up leaving their facility.

==== Hyper-masculine presentation ====
Hyper-masculinity is a different type of presentation of female prison guards. Characteristics of the females that present this way are unbending, unapproachable, hardcore, aggressive, and controlling. Since masculine norms of prison require both male guards and male inmates to appear tough and aggressive, this can cause stress in inmate perception of guards presenting in this manner. Inmates either view these women as "man haters" who have been done wrong by men, thus seeking revenge on male prisoners, or the lesbian enemies of the prison because of their short, cropped hairstyles and their demeanors. This type of self-presentation is usually not received in the best way by the inmates and usually causes tension and hostility between them and the female guards. Though female officers may be drawn to this style of presentation in efforts to disguise their femininity (perceived as weak), it has potential to backfire, being that the negative outcomes outweigh the scarce positives.

=== Humor ===
Humor is found to be the most likely coping mechanism used by older officers to make light of the inmates' situations or their own. They use humor and nonchalance as a coping mechanism for dealing with the controversial things they hear and see while working in the correctional facilities. Many use this to prevent pondering too hardly on each situation they face on an everyday basis. Many of the female officers who use humor to cope are either continuing to work despite their misery or trying to deal with their situation differently. These officers were also more likely to be older and have been working in the correctional institution for a more substantial amount of time.

=== Alcohol and drug usage ===
Correctional officers may turn to drugs and alcohol to temporarily relieve stress and pressures of their workplace. Though female officers are less likely to abuse these substances than their male counterparts, they still take part in these activities in hopes to relieve the physiological effects of correctional officer burnout (headaches, insomnia, back aches, etc.). These bodily effects are psychosomatic, but were treated by the officers with drugs and alcohol. Substance abuse is usually triggered by low recognition of their hard work by their facility and low social connectivity or verbal abuse from fellow correctional staff, which females receive the most of in the corrections field. Women who have multiple roles and responsibilities outside of their facilities are less likely to abuse drugs and alcohol as a coping strategy for stress reduction.

=== Religion ===
One way that female correctional officers find success in coping with stress is religion. Religious techniques can help alleviate stress and emotional exhaustion from occupational pressures. Since proper social interaction is necessary for human survival, simply being a part of religious groups help reduce stress and meet basic social needs.

For those correctional officers who had a spouse practicing any religion, there were positive effects on their overall levels of stress.

== Limitations ==
Though many women become prison officers for a multitude of reasons, including flexible hours, decent benefits, and job security, there are limitations that come with working in corrections as well.

=== Privacy of inmates ===
In a context where a vast majority of prisoners (or even all) are male, hiring women to watch male prisoners can be seen as problematic. Many actions performed in correctional facilities, such as shower patrol, strip searches, and many other normal prison activities, are seen as limitations for female workers. Since female guards are not allowed to be in contact with nude, male inmates or their genitalia, this can put pressure on effective security. Masturbation, using the bathroom, and changing clothes are public spectacles, because doors are not commonly installed on inmates' bathrooms and rooms. As a result, inmate privacy suffers for it. Close proximity to inmates during these instances is shame-inducing for them and can add various levels of frustration and powerlessness to what was already a shameful and powerless situation (being in prison). Problems with female security may range from common privacy to invasion of privacy, and further with experiences of sexual assault from the guard or the inmates.

=== Relationship status ===
Relationships for female correctional officers have potential limits. Women working in corrections are less likely to be married during that time; they are more likely to be single. A lot of these women are usually also single parents, raising children on their own.

Some of the women who worked in correctional facilities but ended up leaving are seen coming back to visit inmates with whom they are perceived to have been having relations with.

== Reality ==
There are many different misconceptions of women working as correctional officers, some of the most common being veritably inaccurate. There is much concern regarding the female officer's ability to perform during acts of violence. While working in such an institution, a female officer may come into contact with danger while doing bodily searches on inmates, becoming the physical mediator between inmate fights, and observing intimate areas for illegal items. While female correctional officers are usually perceived to be vulnerable and gullible, they are actually "conned" less than their male counterparts. Because inmates usually feel more comfortable being honest and open with women due to common gender expectations, they feel less inclined to lie or con their way out of situations in fear of being harshly reprimanded. In addition, women corrections officers possess a substantial amount of confidence in their job performance. They are actually perceived to create a more positive, relaxed atmosphere for their inmates depending on how they treat them.
