= Prison officer =

Law enforcement official

Prisons officer
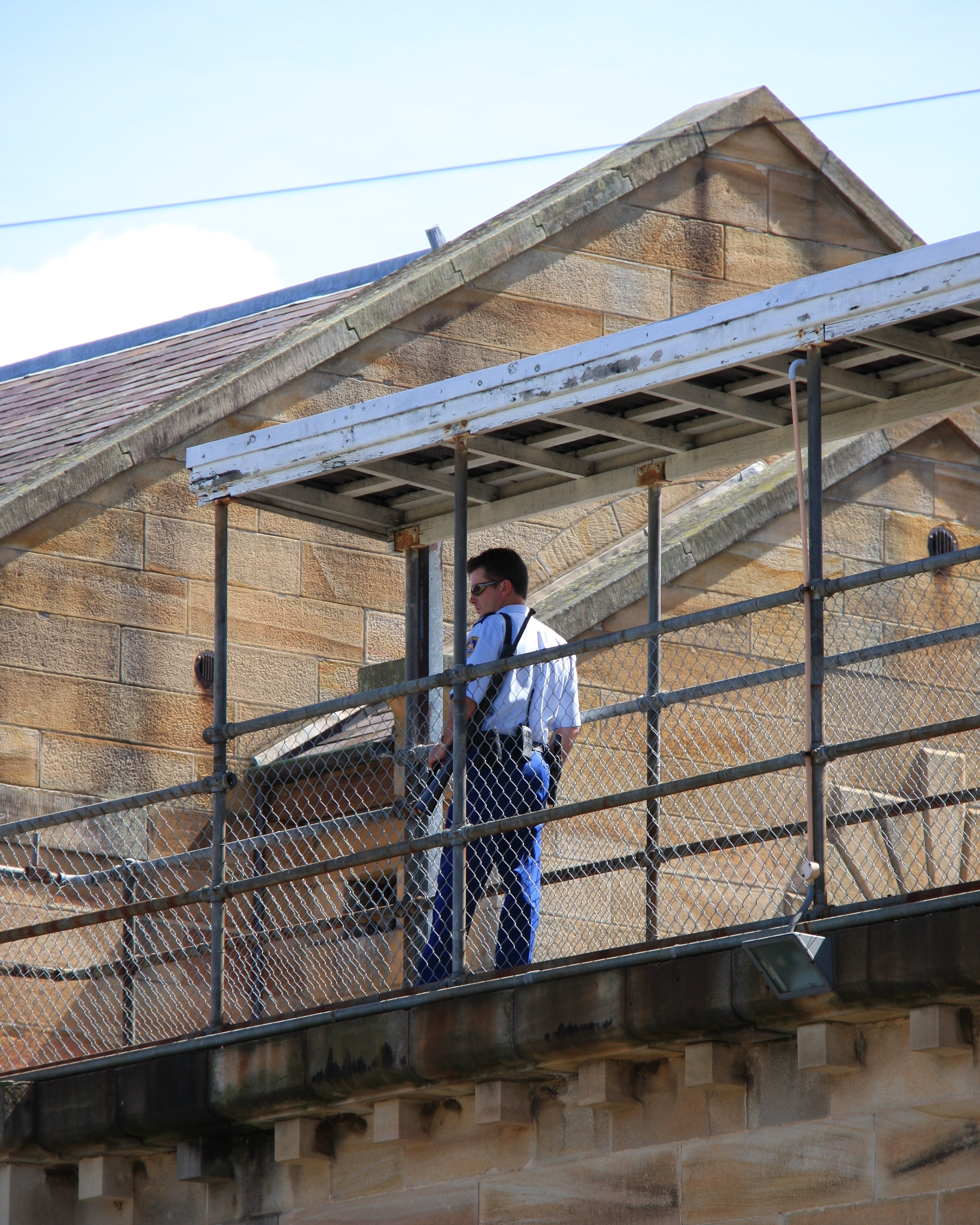
- A prison guard on lookout in the watchtower at Parramatta Gaol

Occupation
- Names: Corrections Officer; Correctional Officer; Correctional Law Enforcement Officer; Correctional Police Officer (New Jersey); Correctional Peace Officer (California); Detention Officer; Detention Deputy; Jailer; Prison Guard; Prison Officer
- Occupation type: Employment
- Activity sectors: Law enforcement

Description
- Competencies: See Working environment
- Education required: See Training
- Fields of employment: Prisons, jails
- Related jobs: Police officer

A prison officer (PO) or corrections officer (CO), also known as a correctional law enforcement officer, is a uniformed law enforcement official responsible for the custody, supervision, safety, and regulation of prisoners.

== Terms for the role ==
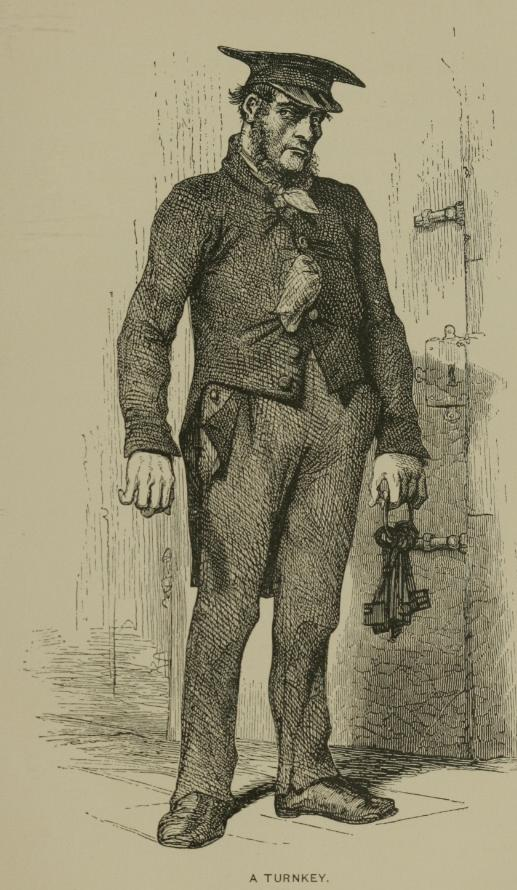
A turnkey of a Paris prison, 19th century

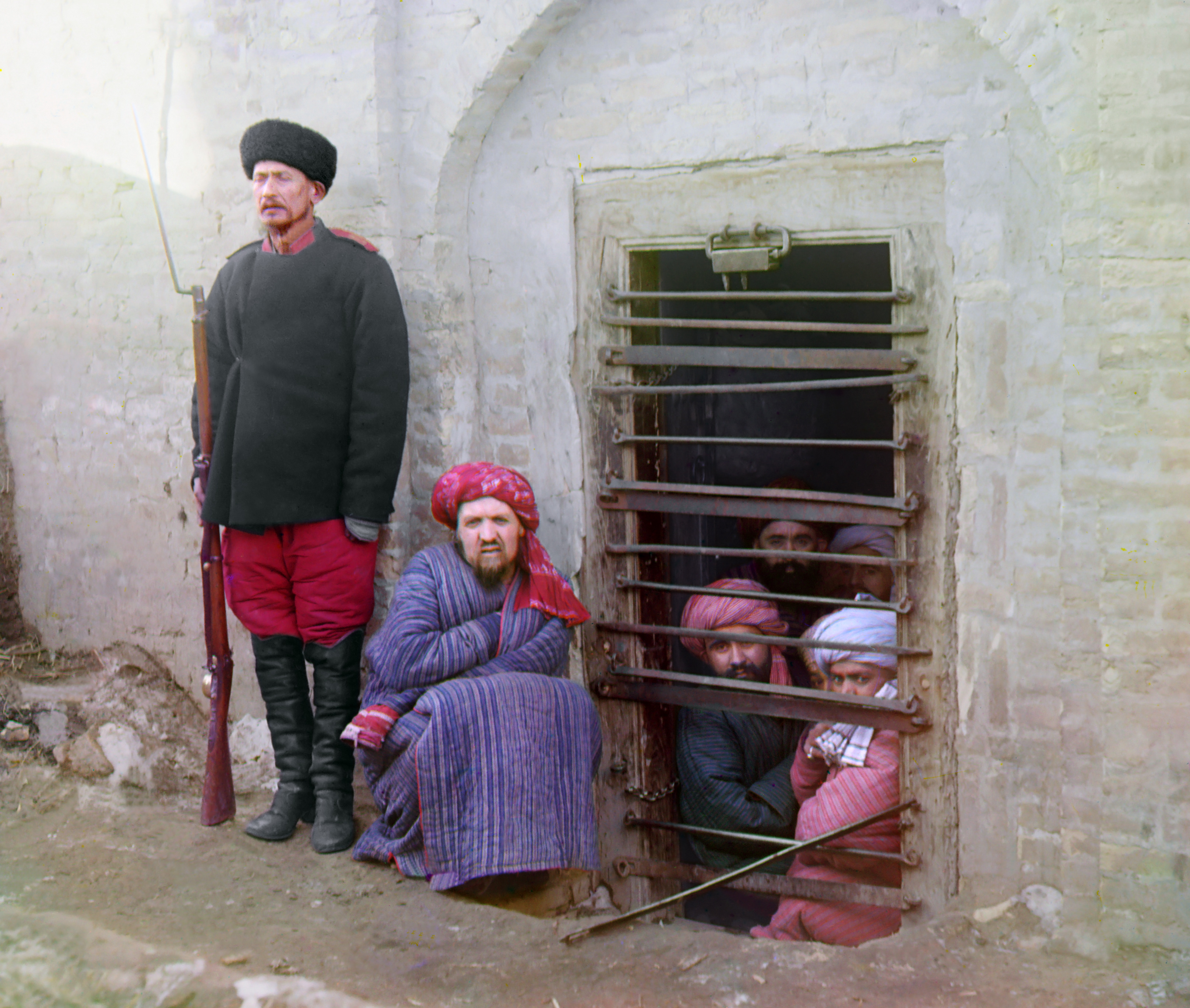
A Russian jail with a prison guard, 1915

Historically, terms such as "jailer" (also spelled "gaoler"), "guard" and "warder" have all been used. Slang terms have included "turnkey", "screw", "tier boot", "hura", "CO", "Cop", "boss", "keeper", and others pending the region or area.

The term "prison officer" is used for the role in the UK and Ireland. It is the official English title in Denmark, Finland, Sweden and Poland.

The term "corrections officer" or "correction officer" is used in the U.S. and New Zealand. "Detention officer" is used in the U.S., as is the term "penal officer". The term "correctional police officer" or "CPO" is used in New Jersey. Due to the law enforcement status and authority of New Jersey's officers, New Jersey's officers employed by the Department of Corrections are classified as "police officers".

Brazil has a similar system to New Jersey, but the officers are known as "state penal police agent" or "federal penal police agent".

"Correctional officer" is used in Australia, Canada, Jamaica, and the U.S.

In Australia, prison officers were known as turnkeys until the 19th century after which they were known as warders until the late 20th century. Following this period they were known as prison officers and later correctional officers. A slang term for a prison officer throughout the British Empire was, and still is, 'screw'.

The official who is in charge of a specific prison is known by various titles, including: "prison warden" (US and Canada), "governor" (UK and Australia), "superintendent" (South Asia) or "director" (New Zealand), respectively "Direktor" or "Gefängnisdirektor" (Germany).

== Duties ==
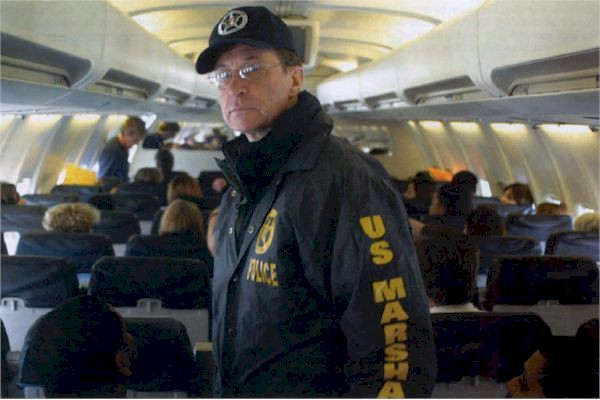
US Marshals and prisoners on board a Con Air flight

Prison officers are responsible for the security of the facility and its property as well as other law enforcement functions.

Correction officers may assist police officers on/off duty depending on their peace officer status and jurisdiction.

Most prison officers or corrections officers are employed by the government of the jurisdiction in which they operate, although some are employed by private companies that provide prison services to the government.

== Training ==
Corrections officers' training will vary from jurisdiction to jurisdiction as well as facility to facility depending on the legislated power given, the nature of the facilities, or even the socioeconomic of the region. In the United States, both Federal and State Correctional Officers attend Correctional Academies similar to Police or other Law Enforcement raining academies, these will vary from state to state.

Training may be provided by external agencies or at the facility with a peer-group or supervisor instructor. In North America, standard training usually includes:

- Use of force and restraints (i.e., handcuffs, leg-irons, belly-chains, etc.)
- Weapons (firearms, taser, pepper spray, baton, etc.)
- Self-defense
- First aid and CPR
- Report writing
- Giving testimony in court
- Defusing hostility
- Interpersonal communication
- Correction law
- Criminal law
- Criminal procedure law
- Case work and criminal investigations
- Hostage negotiation
- Gang intelligence
- Cross gender supervision

Many jurisdictions have also, in recent years, expanded basic training to include:

- Suicide prevention/crisis intervention
- Mental health awareness
- Critical incident stress management
- Occupational Safety and Health Act (U.S.) or Workplace Hazardous Materials Information System (Canada)
- Gang awareness and intervention
- Crisis or hostage negotiation
- Drug abuse training
- Rehabilitation programs
- Rapid response training
- Prison Rape Elimination Act of 2003 (PREA)
- Diversity, equity, and inclusion (DEI)
- Staff wellness

== Specialized units ==
Most institutions in the United States have a crisis resolution team of some sort, though these vary in name:

Name	Abbreviation
Crisis Resolution Team	CRT
Special Response Team	SRT
Critical Incident Response Team	CIRT
Correctional Emergency Response Team	CERT
Crisis and Emergency Response Team	CERT
Correctional Emergency Unit	CEU
Special Security Team	SST
Disturbance Control Team	DCT
Special Operations And Response Team	SORT
Tactical Support Unit	TSU

These teams take on a role similar to a police SWAT or Special Weapons and Tactics team, but are tailored to the prison setting.

Though these vary greatly from jurisdiction to jurisdiction, they typically must pass a very physically and mentally demanding tactical academy or training course, often lasting a week or more.

Special units must qualify regularly and at shorter intervals than regular line staff to remain in the specialized position. They must also score in the 90th percentile or better of the standard scoring systems.

== See also ==
- Bailiff
- Female prison officers
- Law enforcement officer
- Parole officer
- Prisoner custody officer
