= Belly chain (restraint) =

Physical restraint worn by prisoners

A belly chain (also known as a waist chain or Martin chain) is a physical restraint worn by prisoners. It consists of a chain around the waist to which the prisoner's hands may be chained or cuffed. Sometimes the ankles are also connected by means of longer chains.

== Usage ==
Such restraints are often used in the United States in courtrooms, or for transporting prisoners, or in other public situations as a safeguard against escape. They are used above all when detainees are to be restrained over a longer period of time, for example during transport or at court hearings. When using a belly chain, the hands are cuffed to the chain. Belly chains are used because there still remains a relatively large freedom of movement to the detainee when their hands are cuffed in front of the body. This method is used as an alternative to cuffing the hands behind the detainee's back, which inflicts discomfort and pain over long periods of time.

== Types ==
There are essentially two types of belly chains:

- One type consists of a chain with handcuffs attached to the front or at the side. Peerless Model 7002 or Smith & Wesson Model 1800 have the handcuffs attached on both sides by a short chain. This allows some movement (e.g. for signing court papers or pointing at pieces of evidence during testimony), though restricting arm motion to prevent the prisoner from butting or hitting. CTS Thompson Model 7008 has the handcuffs attached on the sides, too, but the handcuffs are directly linked to the belly chain, so that the detainee's hands are tightly attached to their waist; compared to the other models, this provides a more severe restraint. Furthermore, there are combinations like Peerless Model 7705, where the belly chain is connected by a longer chain with a pair of leg irons. This type of combination further restricts the detainee's freedom of movement and prevents them from running and escaping; the chain running down from the belly chain to the leg irons holds the leg irons' chain just off the ground to prevent it from dragging and catching. Such combinations are commonly referred to as "full harness" or "H-style" restraints. When applying this type of belly chain, the chain is first placed tightly around the detainee's waist and secured behind the back with a padlock. Then, the handcuffs are put on the detainee's wrists; the cuffs should always be double locked once applied. In the standard procedure, the prisoner's hands are fixed either in front of the body or parallel at the side of the waist, thus limiting the detainee's freedom of movement. When using such a belly chain to restrain high-risk inmates, the detainee can also be shackled with their arms crossed so that the left wrist is placed in the cuff on the right side of their waist and vice versa. This use is akin to a straitjacket.
- The other type consists of a chain with slightly larger links and a steel loop (martin link) at one end. The chain is placed around the detainee's waist and the steel loop is plugged through a chain link. Then, a pair of handcuffs is inserted in the loop and the cuffs are then put on the detainee's wrists; again, the handcuffs are double locked when applied. The loose end of the belly chain can be secured with a snap hook or a padlock behind the detainee's back. Since in this configuration the belly chain cannot be removed unless the handcuffs have been removed first, this type of belly chain does not necessarily need a padlock for fixing. Also, the length of the chain is designed to fit around the waist of almost every person, including slim and stout individuals. For high security transports, the martin link belly chain can be used with security handcuff covers such as the C & S Security Black Box or the CTS Thompson Blue Box. These are hard plastic boxes with a metallic slider and are placed over the handcuffs so that the key holes are hidden by the box. On the one hand, the security cover prevents the detainee from manipulating the keyhole of the handcuffs, for instance if they gets hold of a handcuff key or a lockpick. On the other hand, freedom of movement is further restricted, as the handcuff cover converts standard chain link handcuffs into rigid cuffs.

== Restraint belts ==
Leather or nylon belts are often used instead of belly chains. These restraint belts have a metal ring on the front, through which the handcuffs are plugged and then put on the detainee's wrists. The belt is then placed around the detainee's waist and secured with a buckle; some models can also be locked with a padlock.

== Gallery ==
The following pictures illustrate the different types of restraints and their application:

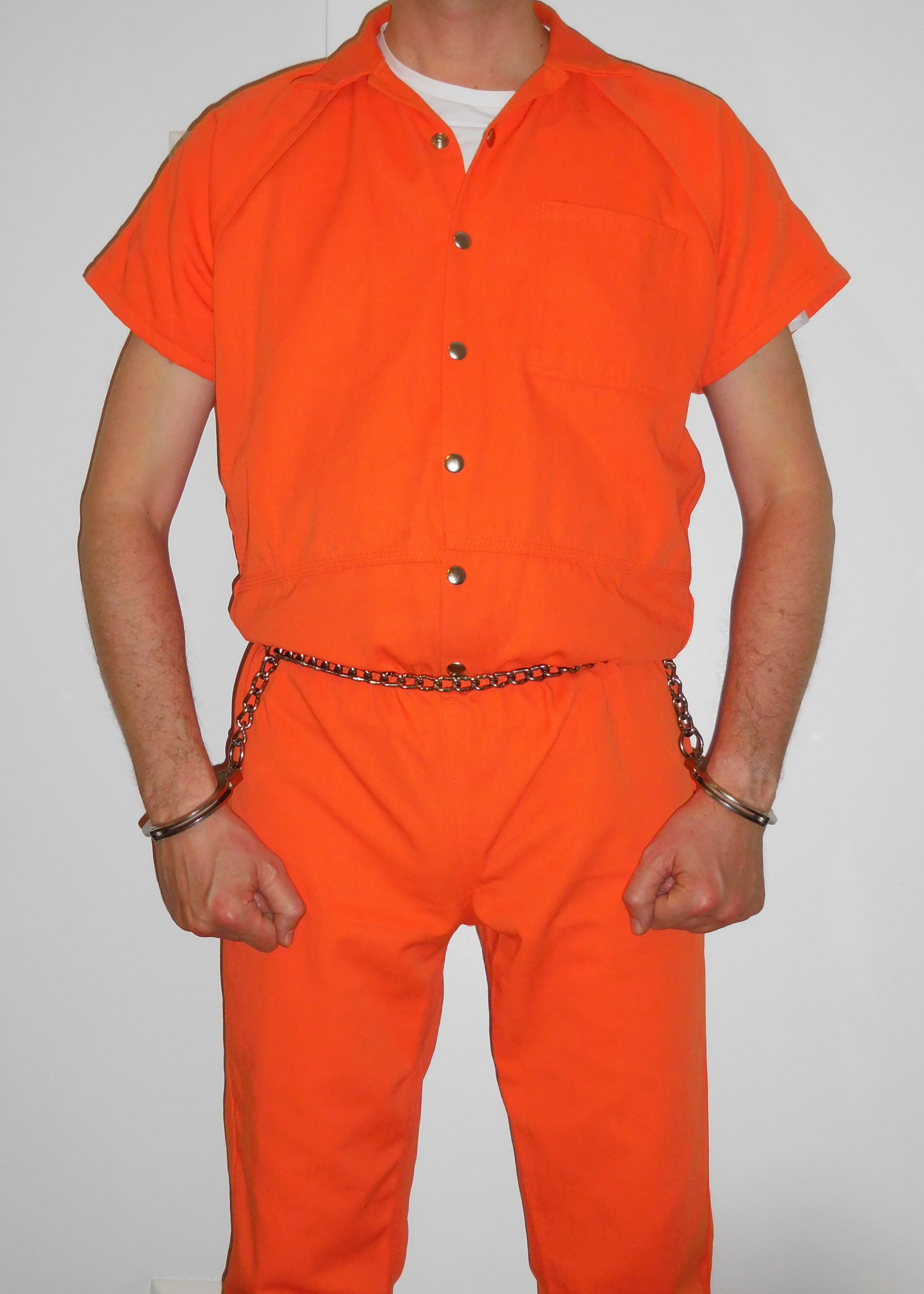
Inmate in belly chain with the arms cuffed parallel at the side

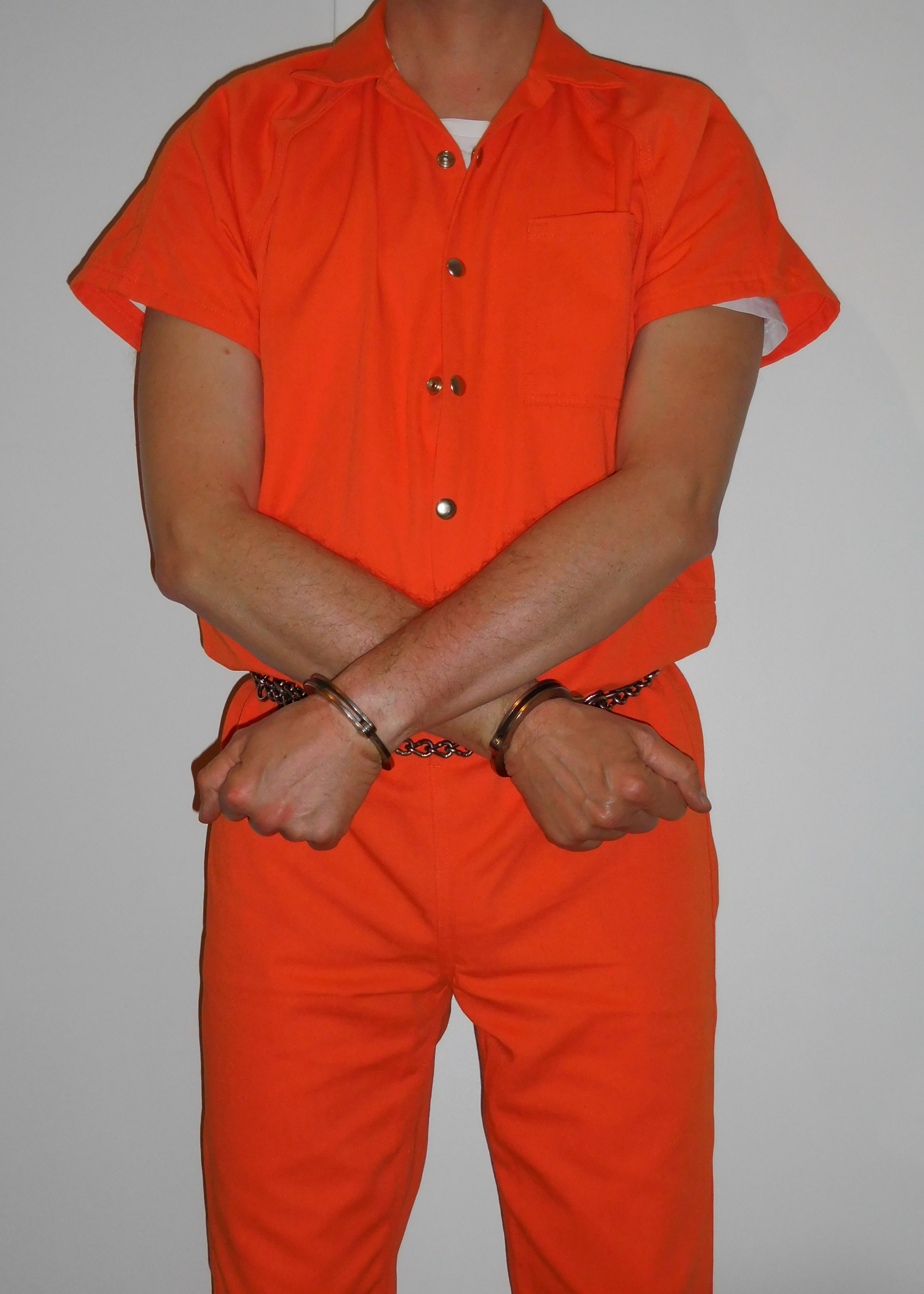
Inmate in belly chain with the arms crossed (high security restraint)

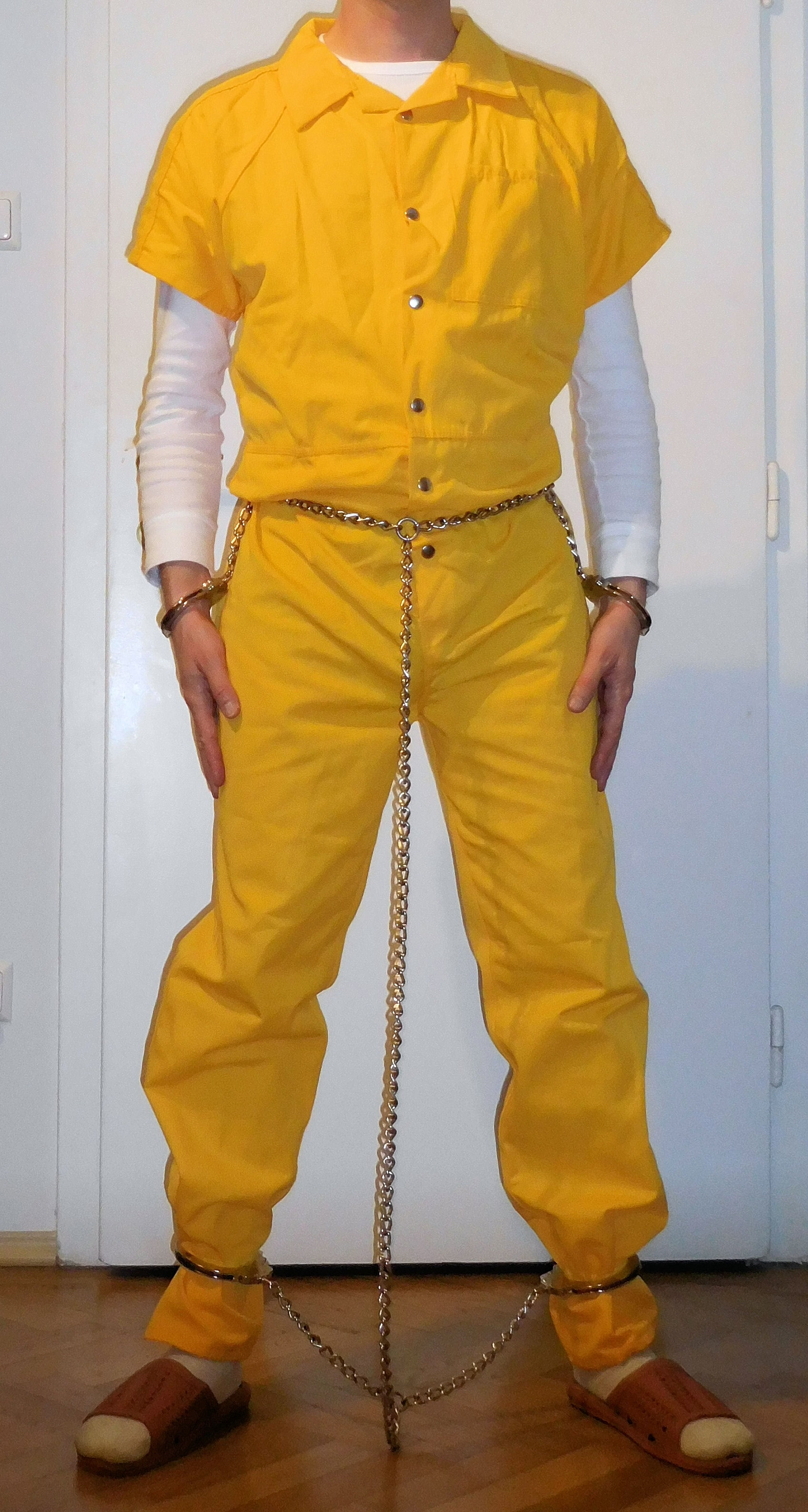
Inmate in "full harness" transport restraints

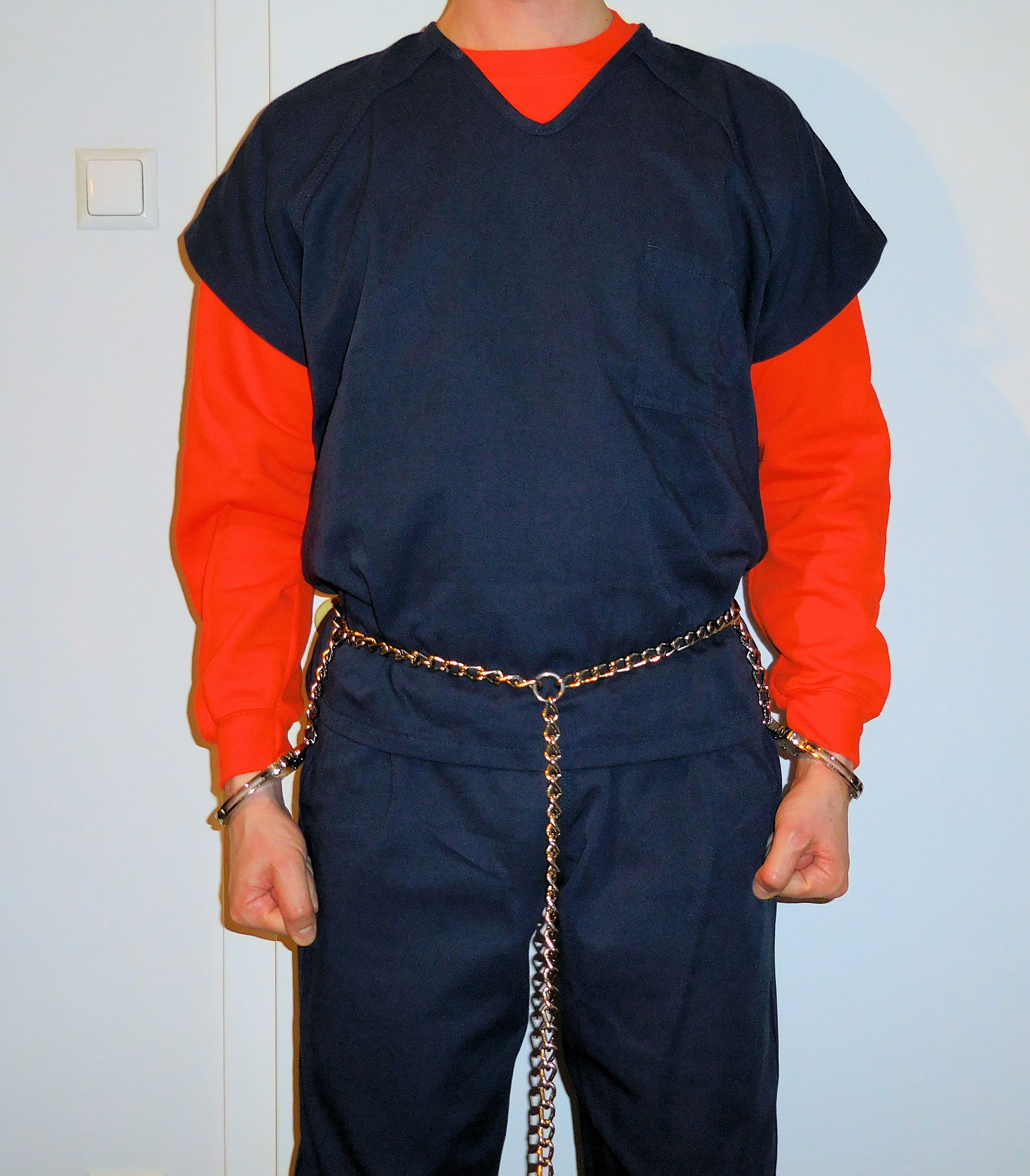
"full harness" transport restraint (detail)

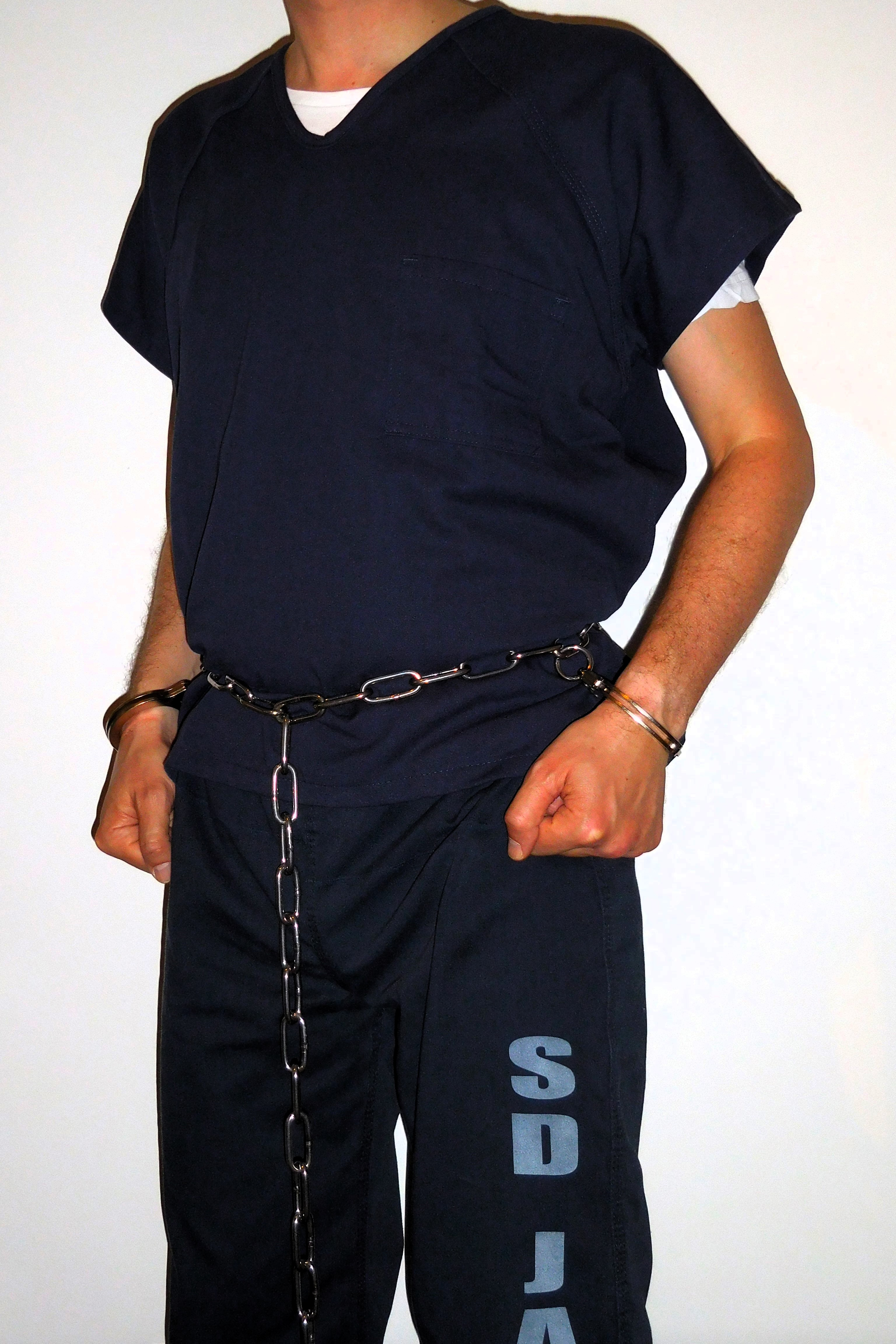
H-style restraint

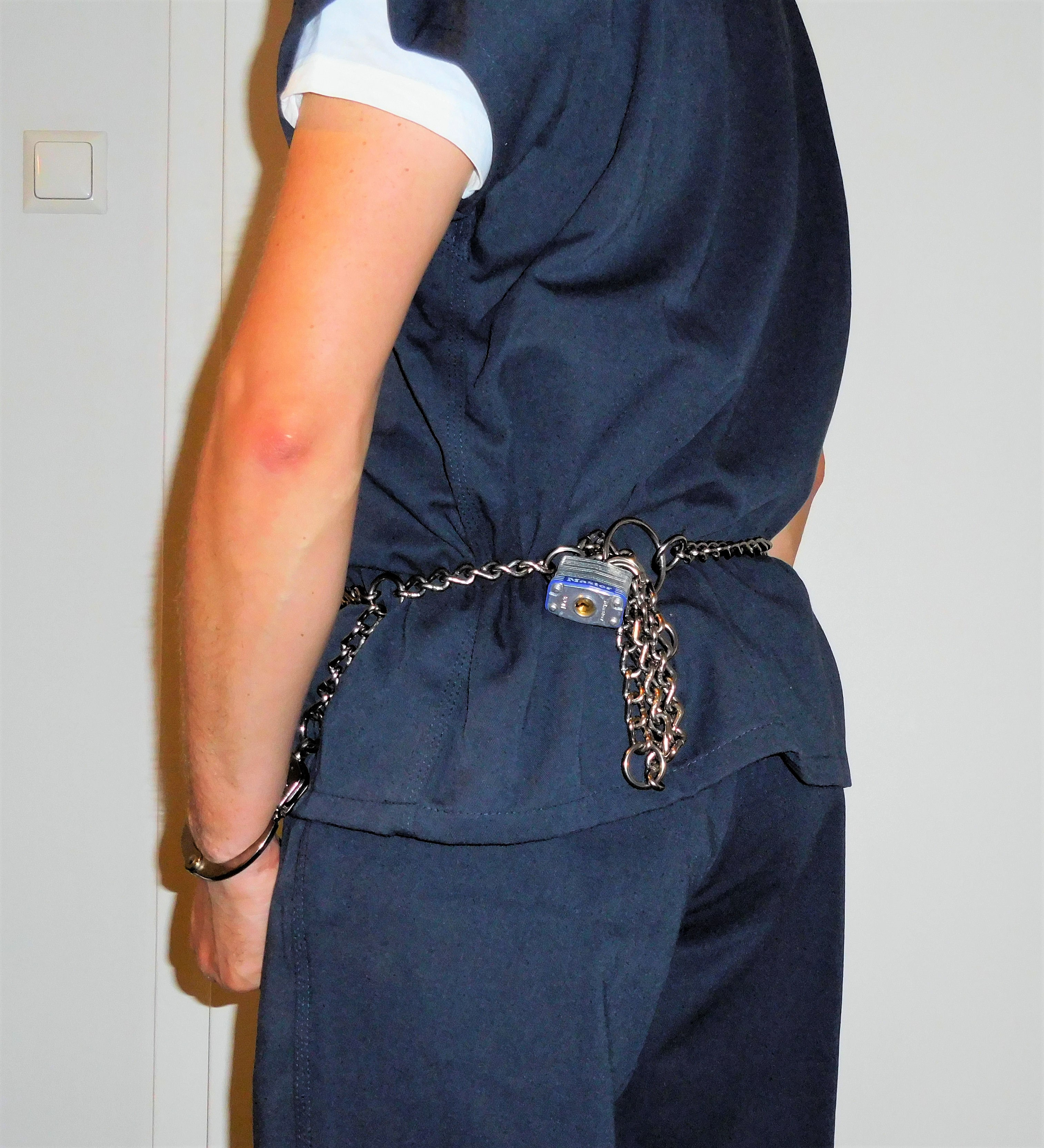
Belly chain secured behind an inmate's back with a padlock

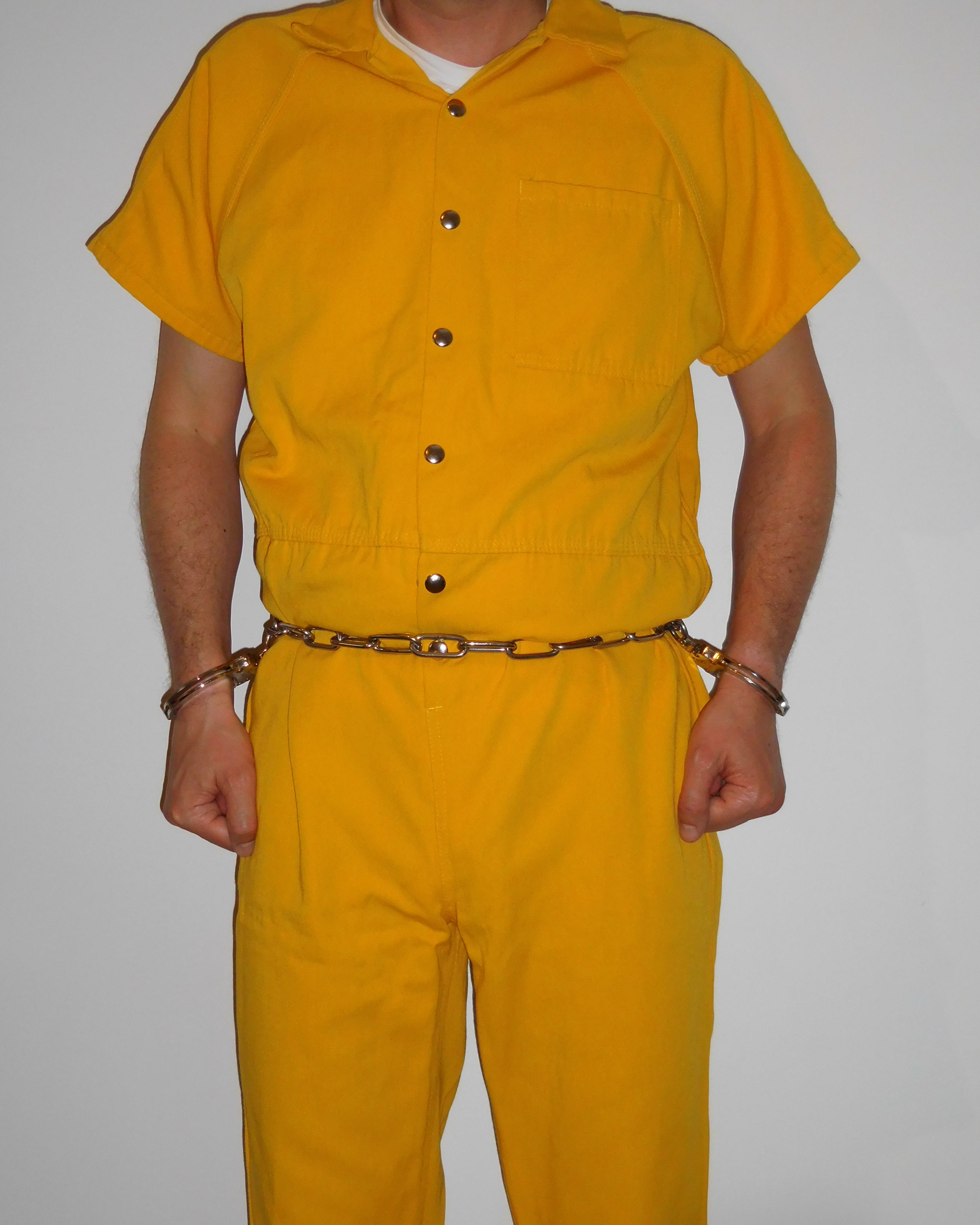
Inmate in belly chain with the handcuffs directly attached to the chain at the sides

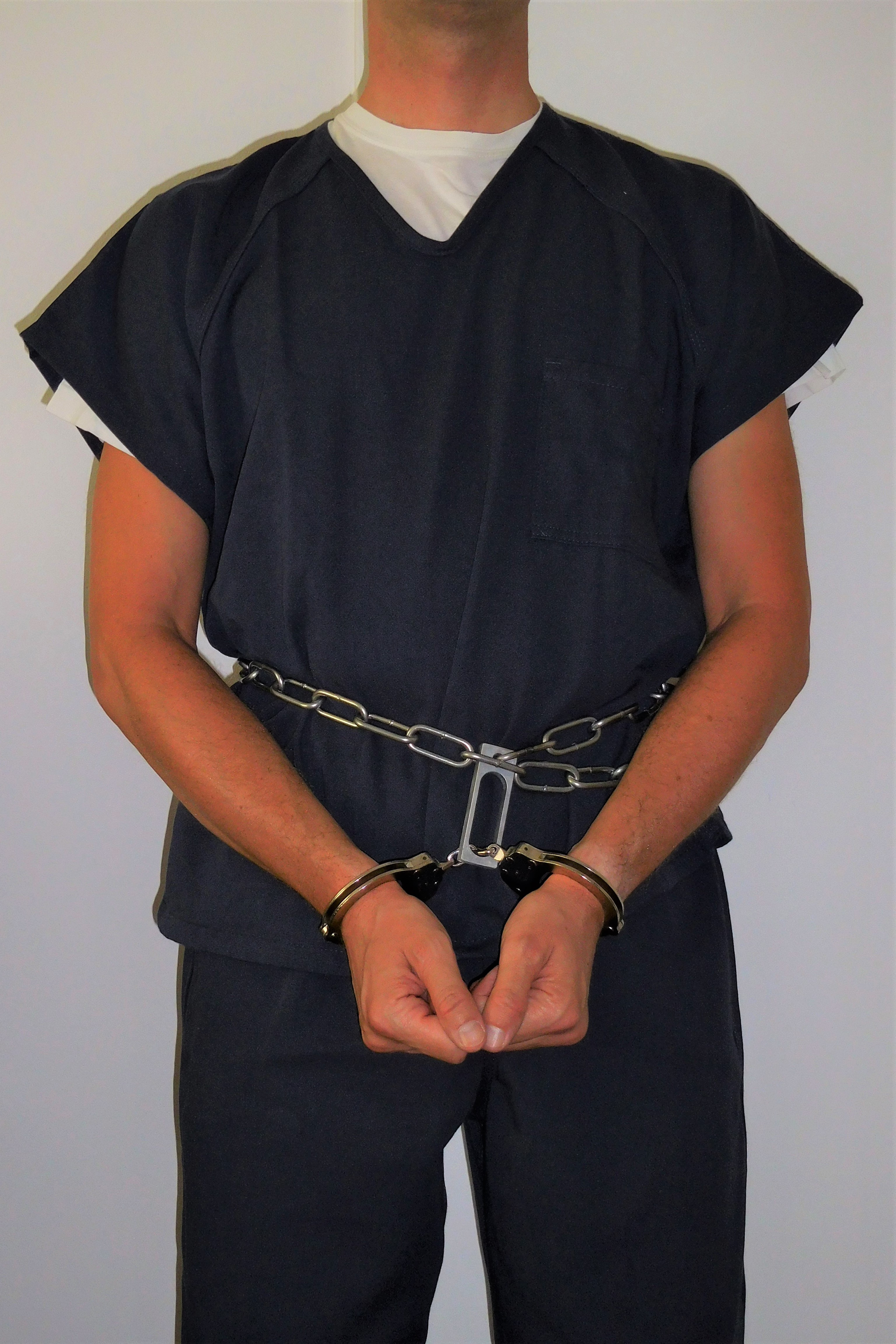
Inmate in belly chain with martin link

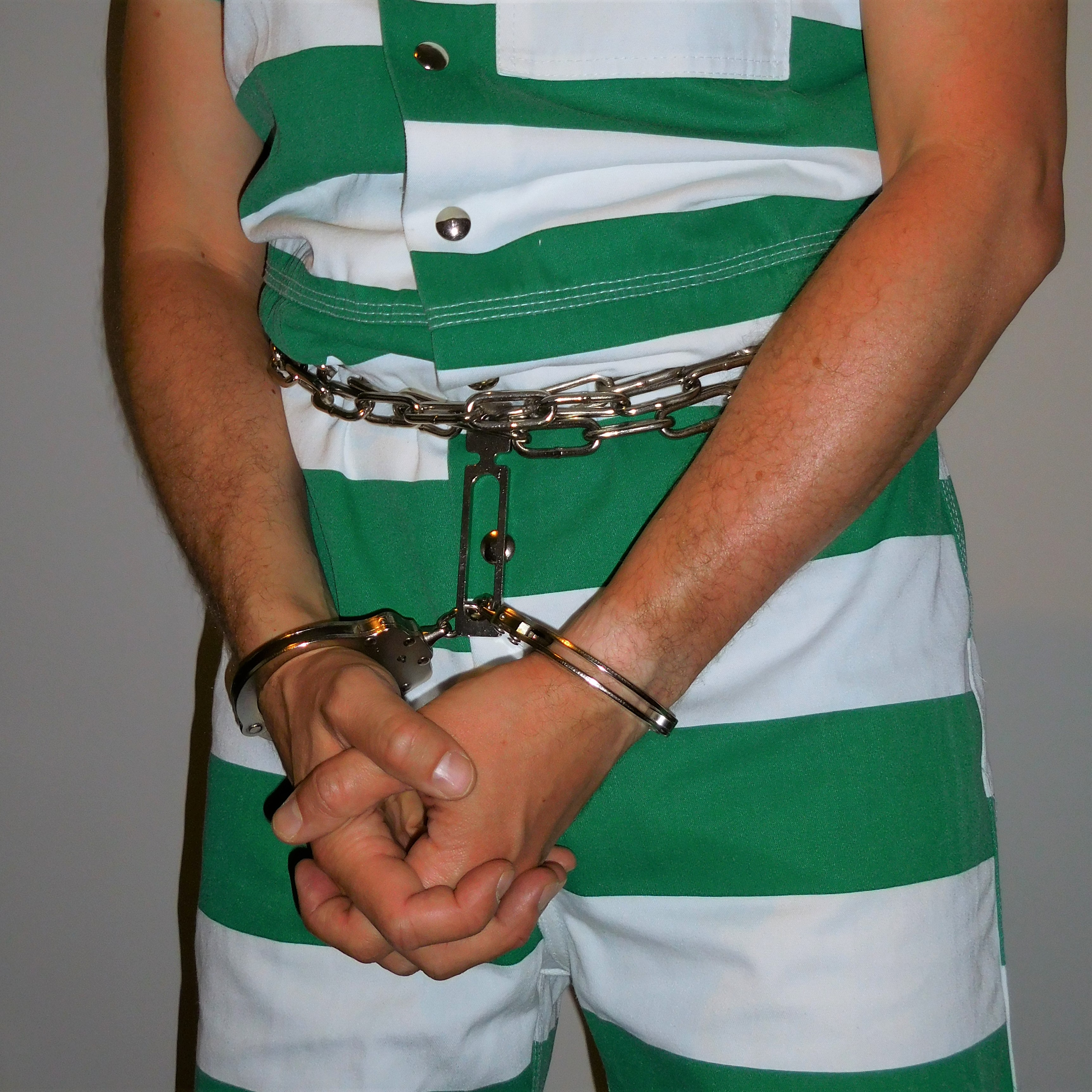
Closeup of martin link belly chain

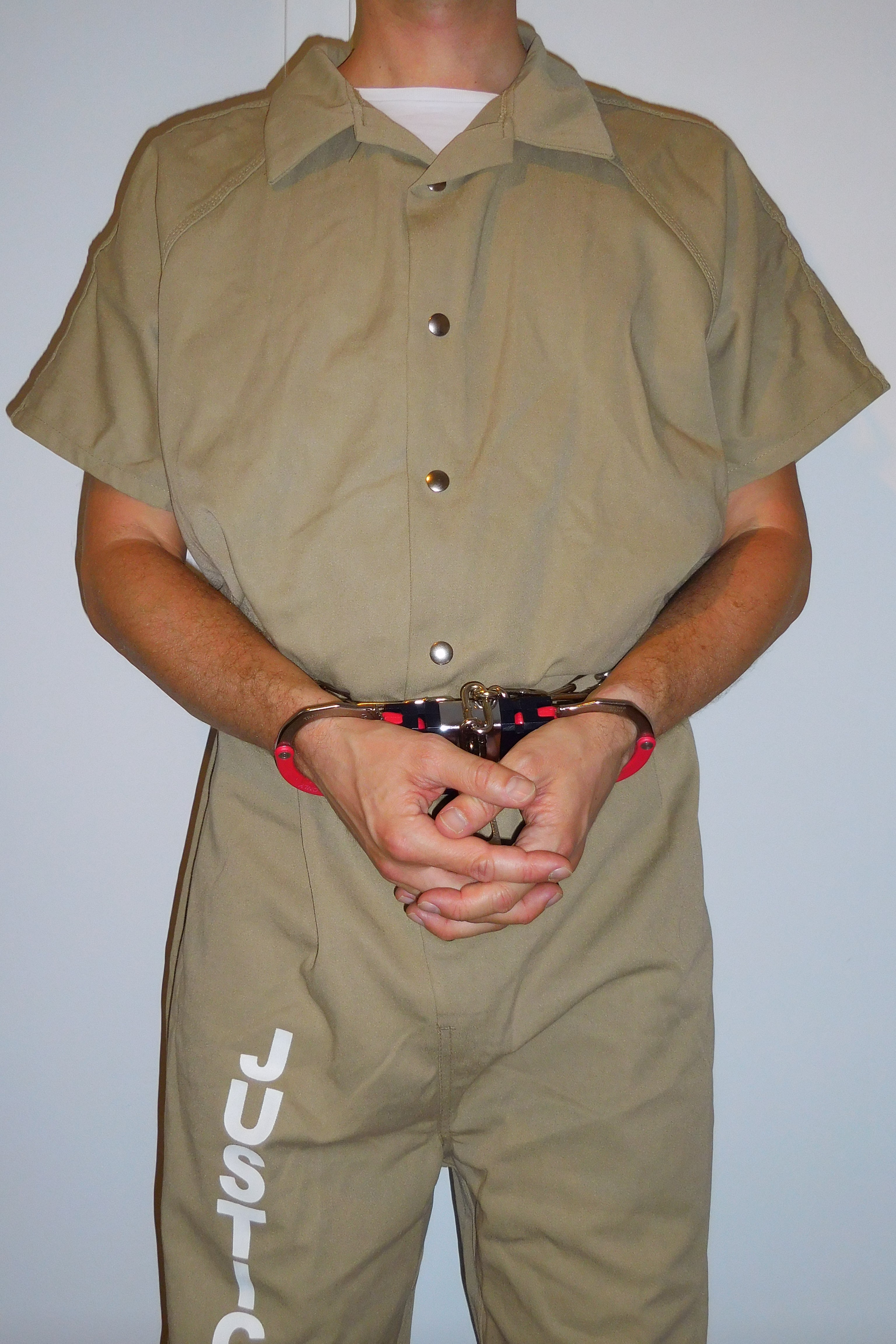
Inmate in belly chain with a handcuff cover (parallel position)

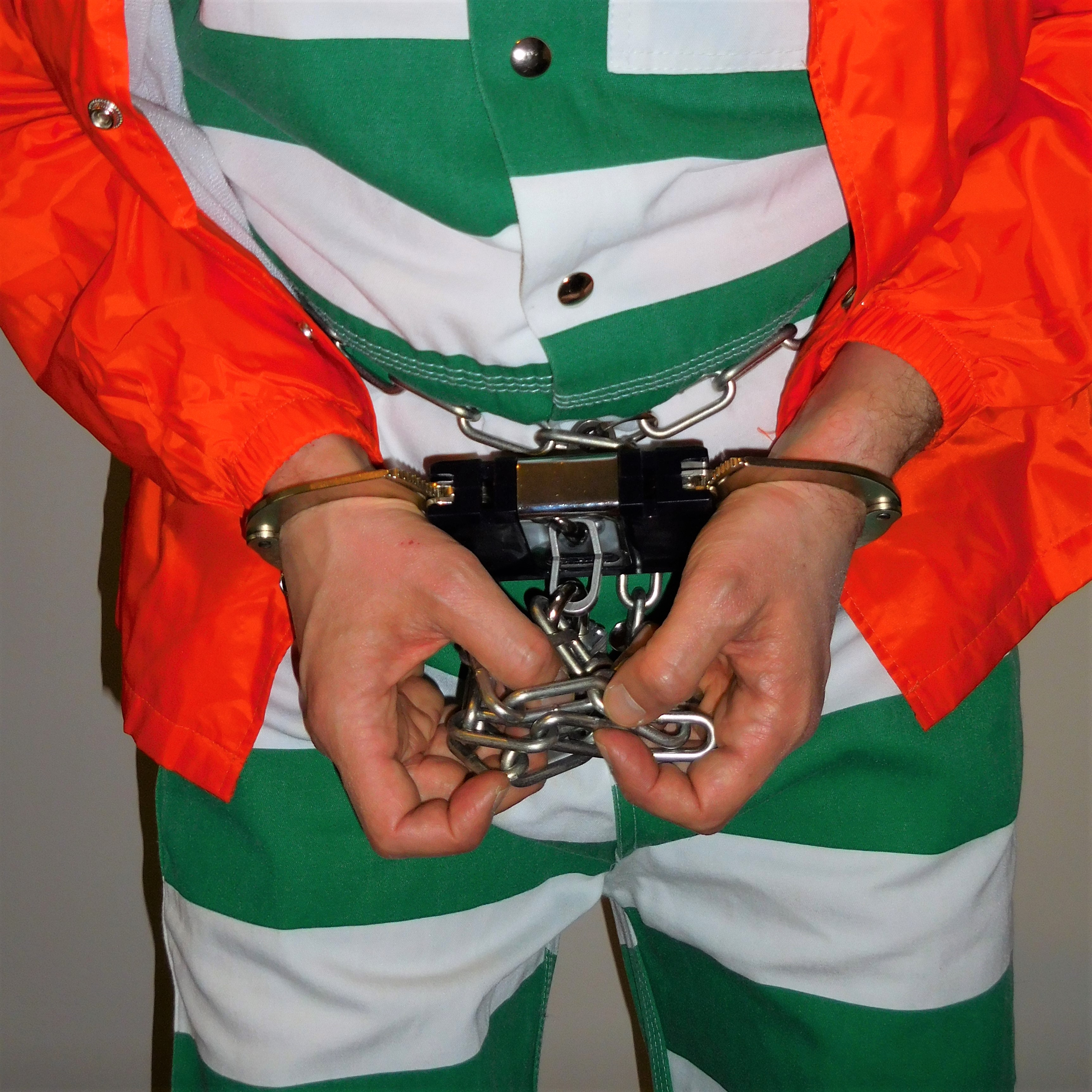
Closeup of parallel position

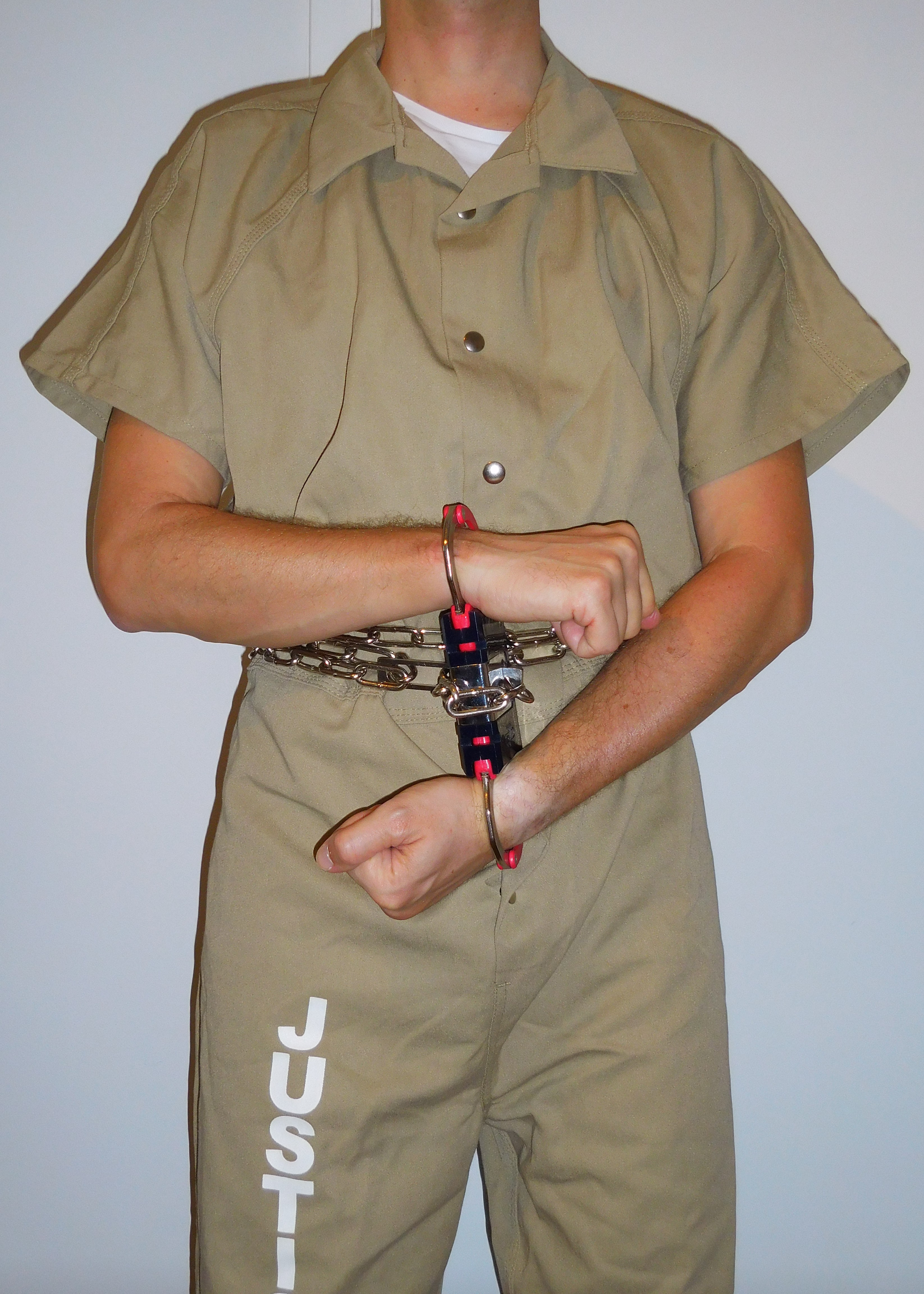
Inmate in belly chain with a handcuff cover (front stack position)

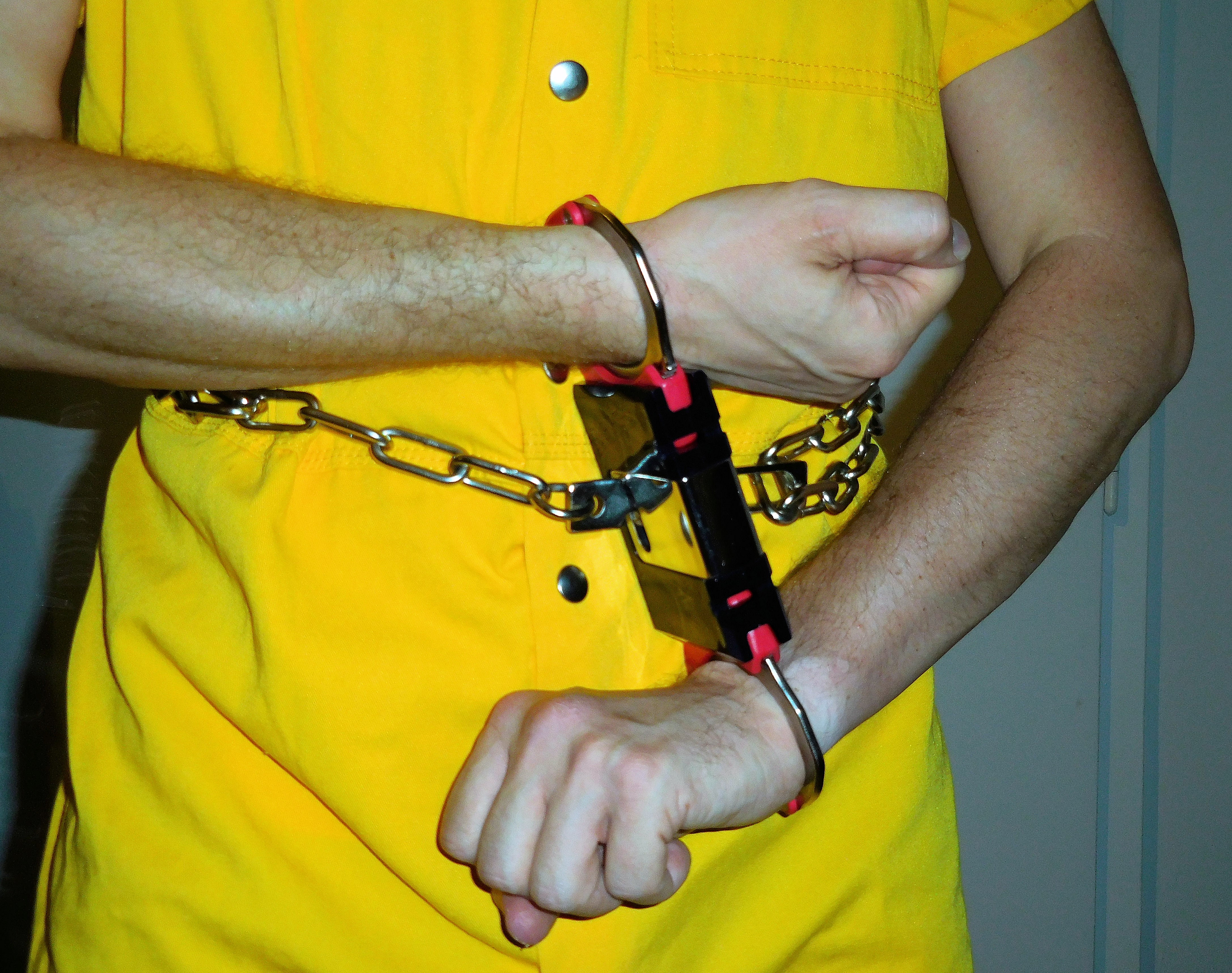
Closeup of front stack

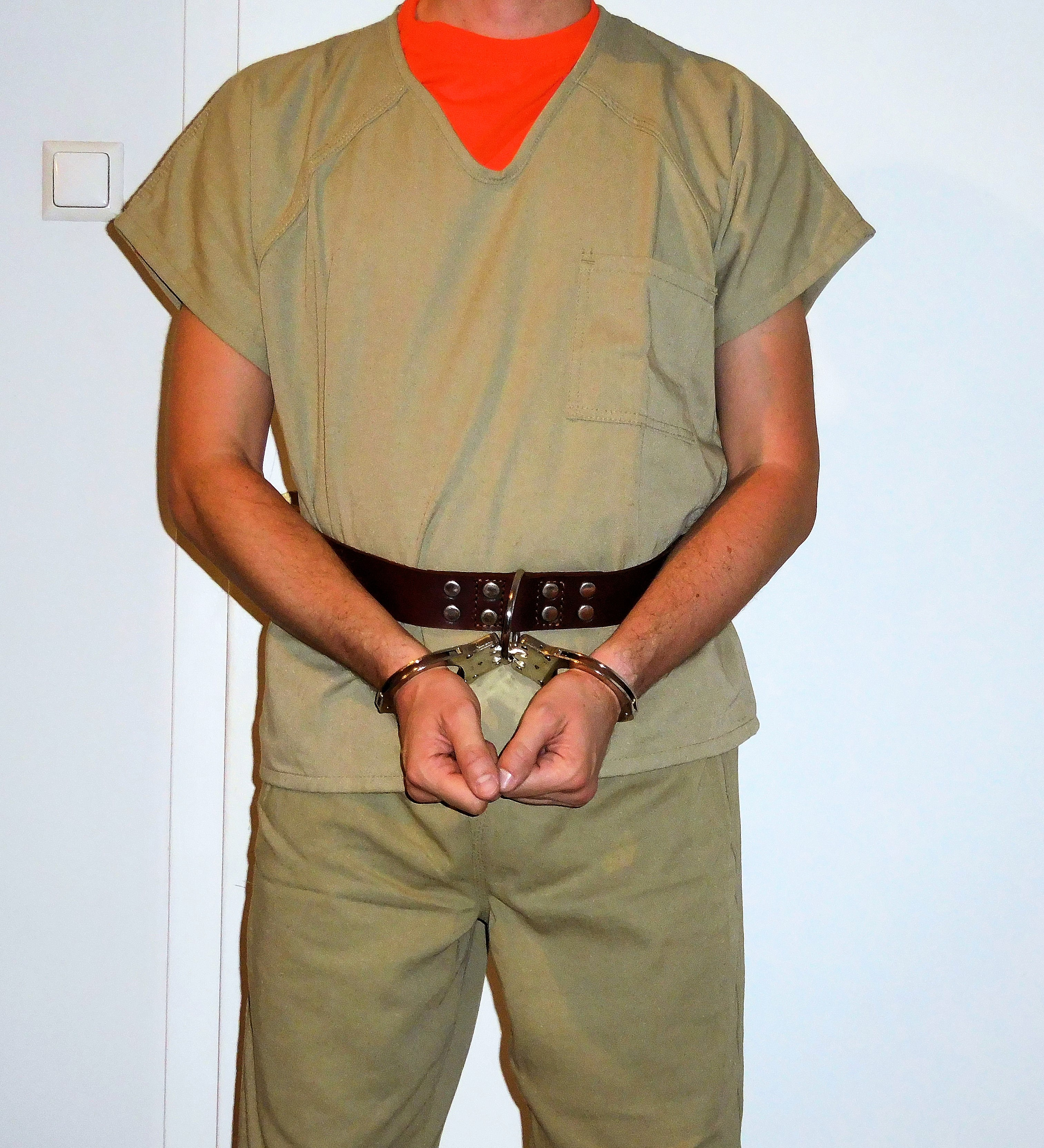
Inmate in hinged handcuffs attached to a leather belt

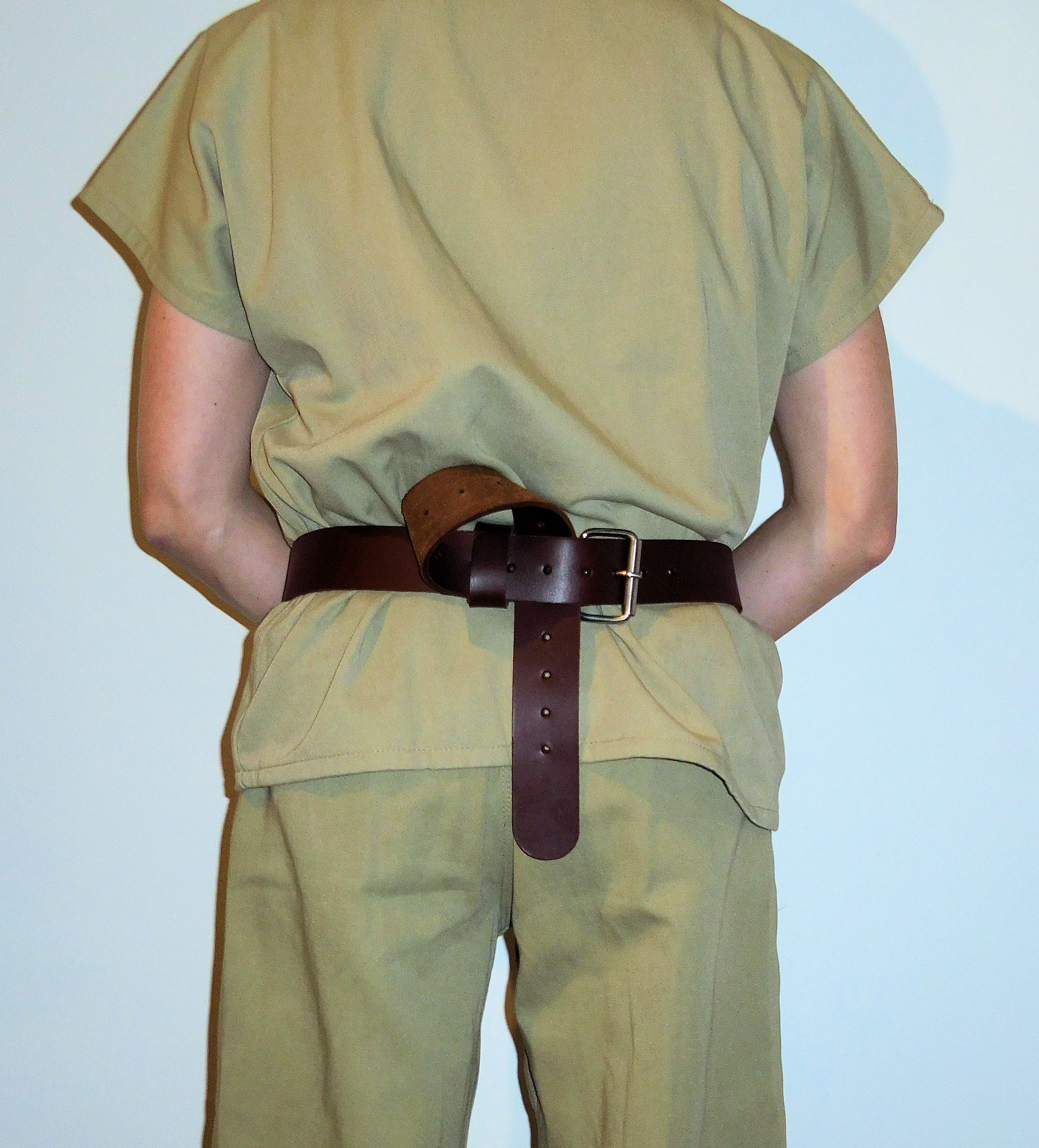
Restraint belt (back view)

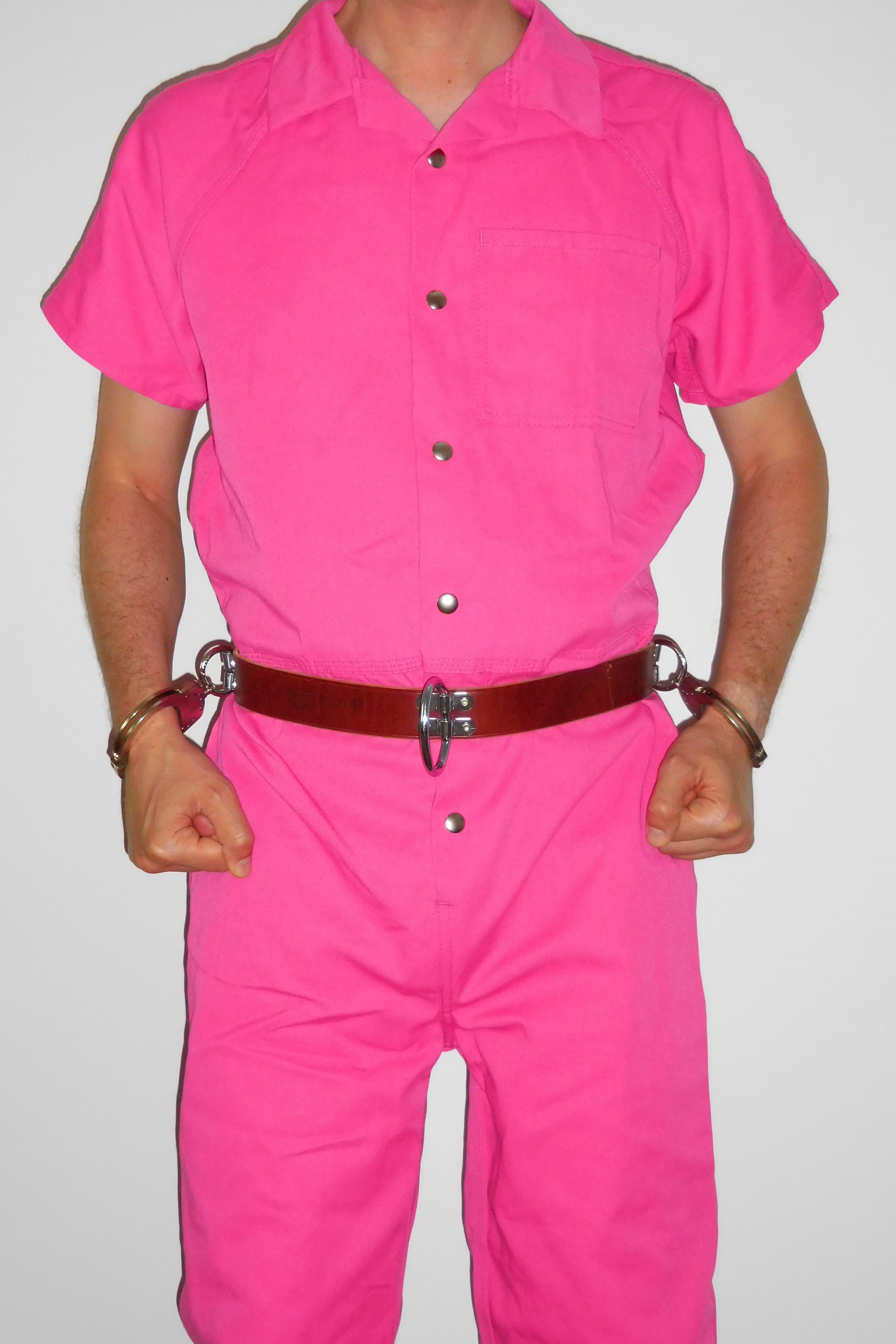
Inmate in transport belt with handcuffs attached at the sides

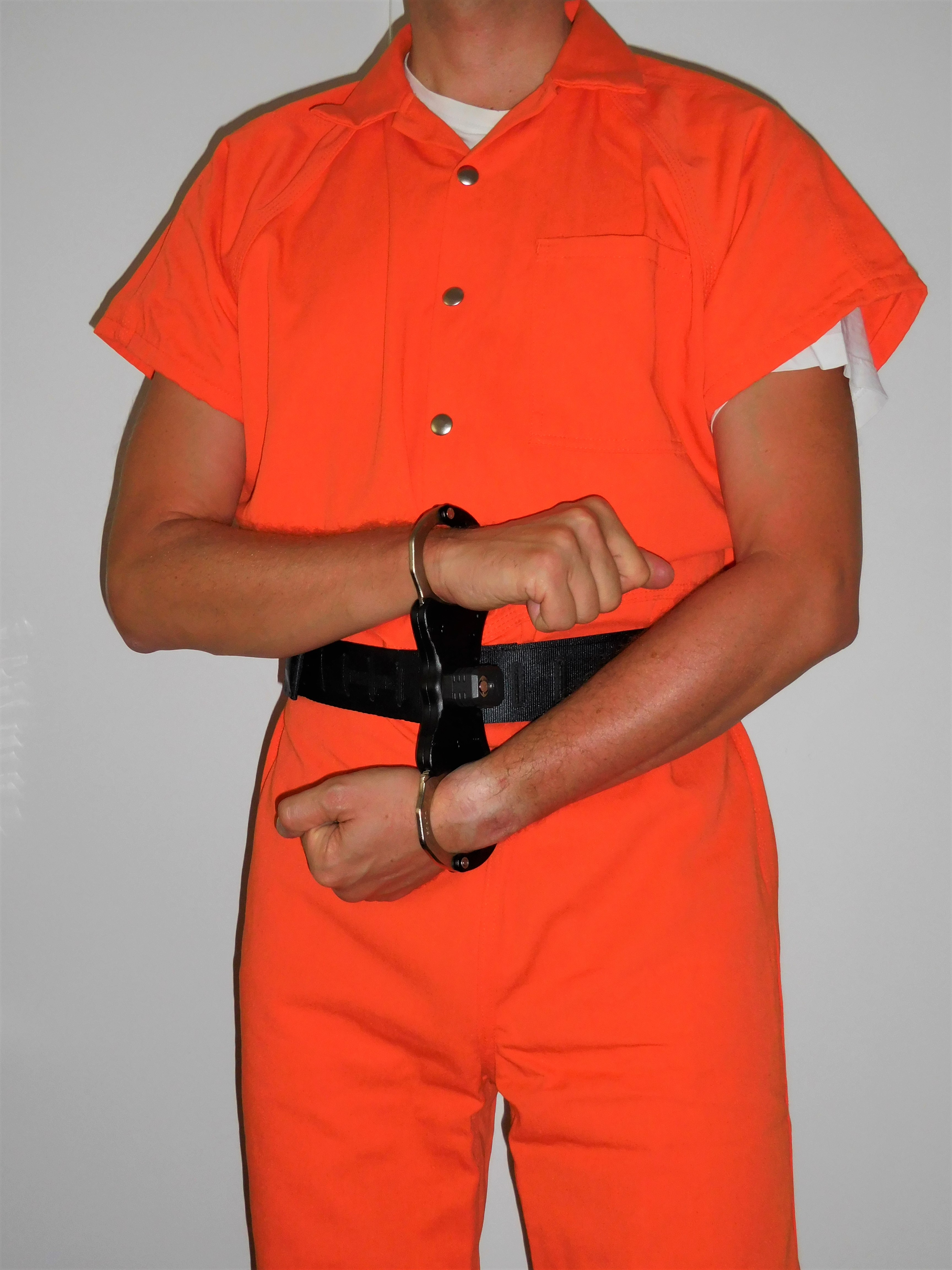
Inmate in ASP transport kit (belt version)

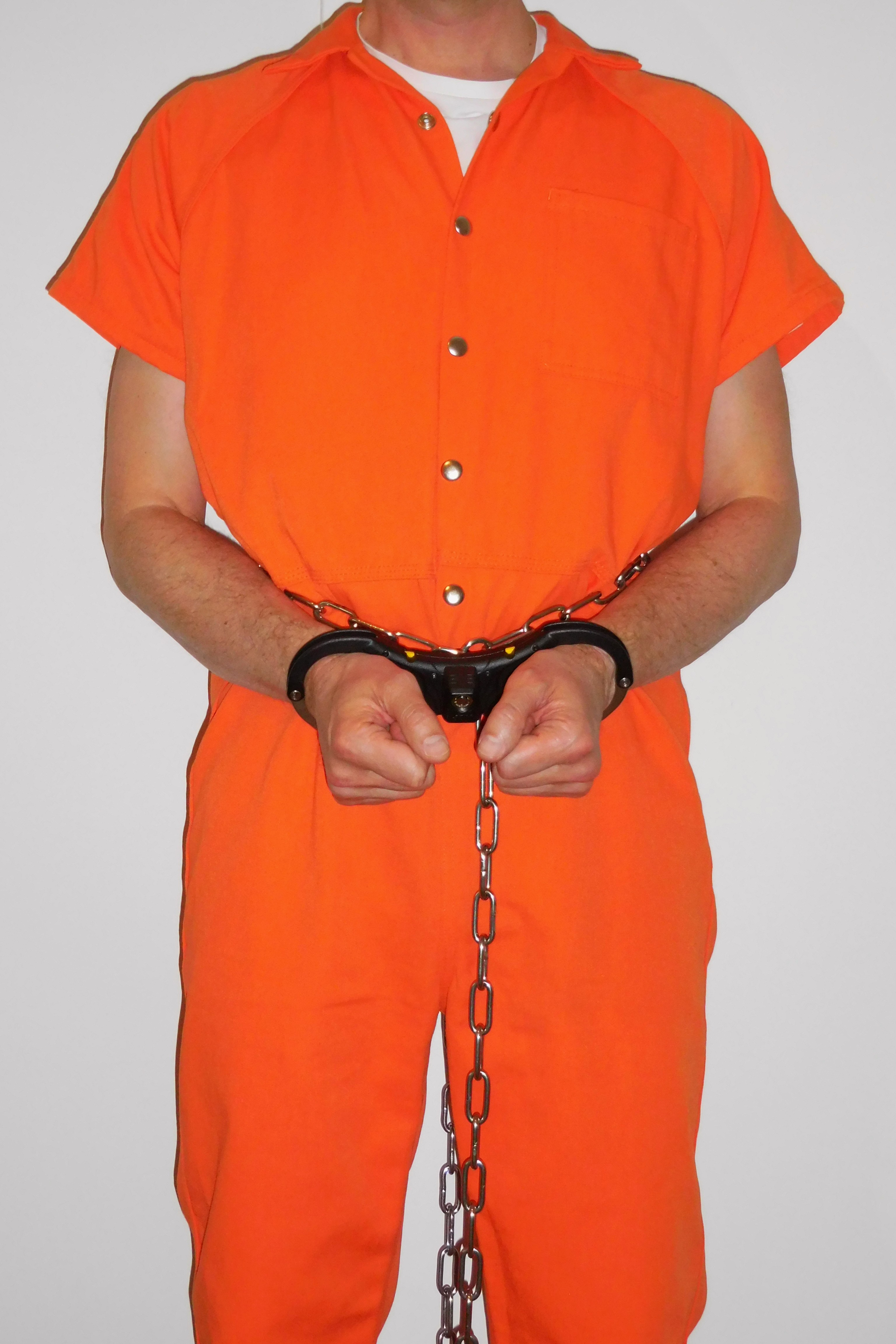
Inmate in ASP transport plus chain
