= Name and shame =

Form of dishonoring or disgracing a group or person

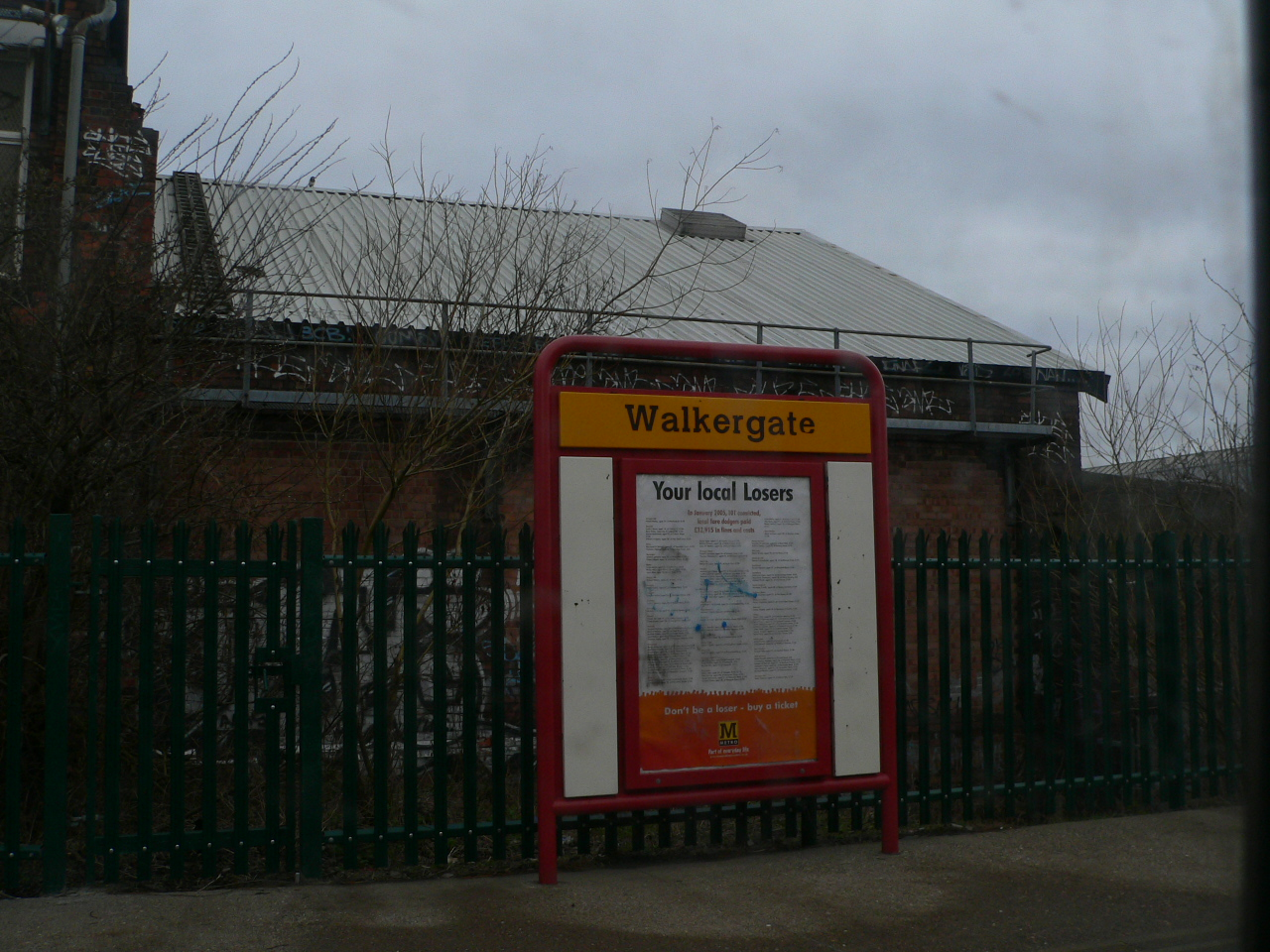
A "Losers" poster on display at Walkergate metro station on the Tyne and Wear Metro. These posters are part of Metro operator's Nexus's "naming and shaming" policy for fare dodgers. The poster publishes the names and addresses of those people caught traveling without a ticket in or from the local area.

To name and shame is to "publicly say that a person, group or business has done something wrong". It is a form of public shaming used to rally popular opinion against and, in turn, discourage certain kinds of behavior or enterprises. The practice occurs both at the domestic and the international levels, where naming-and-shaming is often used to denounce unfair business practices or human rights violations.

There is some evidence that naming and shaming can reduce atrocities and make the named and shamed governments improve their human rights records. Some scholars, however, question whether naming-and-shaming has the intended effects.

== International relations ==
Naming and shaming is a common strategy to compel and deter changes in state and non-state behavior. It is a prevalent strategy when states engage in human rights abuses. It has also been used to compel improvements in environmental policies, stopping whaling being one such example.

== Public policy usage ==
Naming offending individuals or businesses (with the implied objective of shaming them) is sometimes used as an instrument of public policy intended to promote compliance with legal obligations or with the duty to put right the damage caused by non-compliance.

Examples are:

- The UK government established a scheme in 2010 to "name businesses which have failed to pay the National Minimum Wage to their employees. The policy objective of the naming scheme is "to raise awareness of minimum wage enforcement and deter employers who would otherwise be tempted to break minimum wage law". According to a government policy statement, this practice has been adopted because "the government recognises that some employers are more likely to respond to the social and economic sanctions that may flow from details of their payment practices being made public, than from financial deterrents".
- In December 2018, the UK Department for Business, Energy and Industrial Strategy introduced a "naming scheme" to exert reputational pressure on employers who fail to pay Employment Tribunal awards, following publication of government research which found that 34% of employment tribunal awards in England and Wales and 46% in Scotland remained unpaid.
- In 2013, Citizens Advice recommended that the UK's Consumer Bill of Rights should be backed up by action by trading standards regulators to "name and shame" businesses that have failed to correct poor practices which affect consumers.
- From July 2008, the NSW Food Authority has a public list of businesses that have breached food safety regulations to give "consumers more information to make decisions about where they eat or buy food".

== See also ==
- Public humiliation
- Real-name reporting
- Mass media
- Humiliation
- Online shaming
- Doxing
- Cancel culture
- Ostracism
