= Public humiliation =

Form of punishment whose main feature is dishonoring or disgracing a person

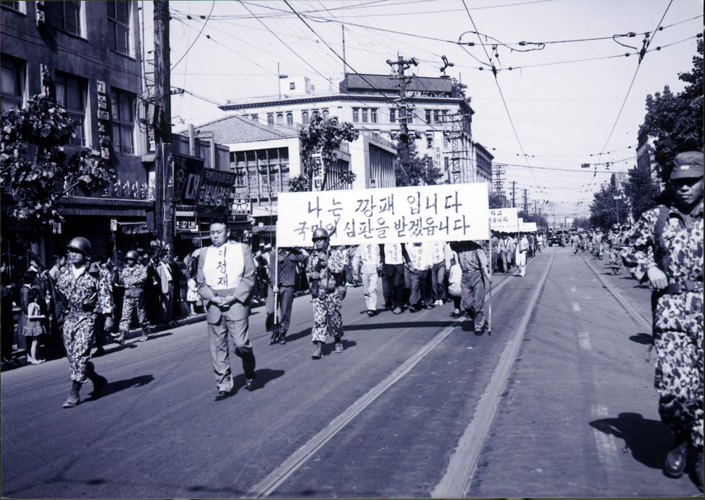
South Korean gang leader Lee Jung-jae being shame-paraded by Park Chung Hee's military regime (1961).

Public humiliation or public shaming is a form of punishment whose main feature is dishonoring or disgracing a person, usually an offender or a prisoner, especially in a public place. It was regularly used as a form of judicially sanctioned punishment in previous centuries, and is still practiced by different means (e.g. schools) in the modern era.

In the United Kingdom, it was a common punishment from the beginning of European colonization through the 18th century. It fell out of common use in the 20th century, though it has seen a revival starting in the 1980s. With the rise of social media, public shaming moved to the digital sphere, exposing and humiliating people daily, sometimes without their knowledge.

== Shameful exposure ==
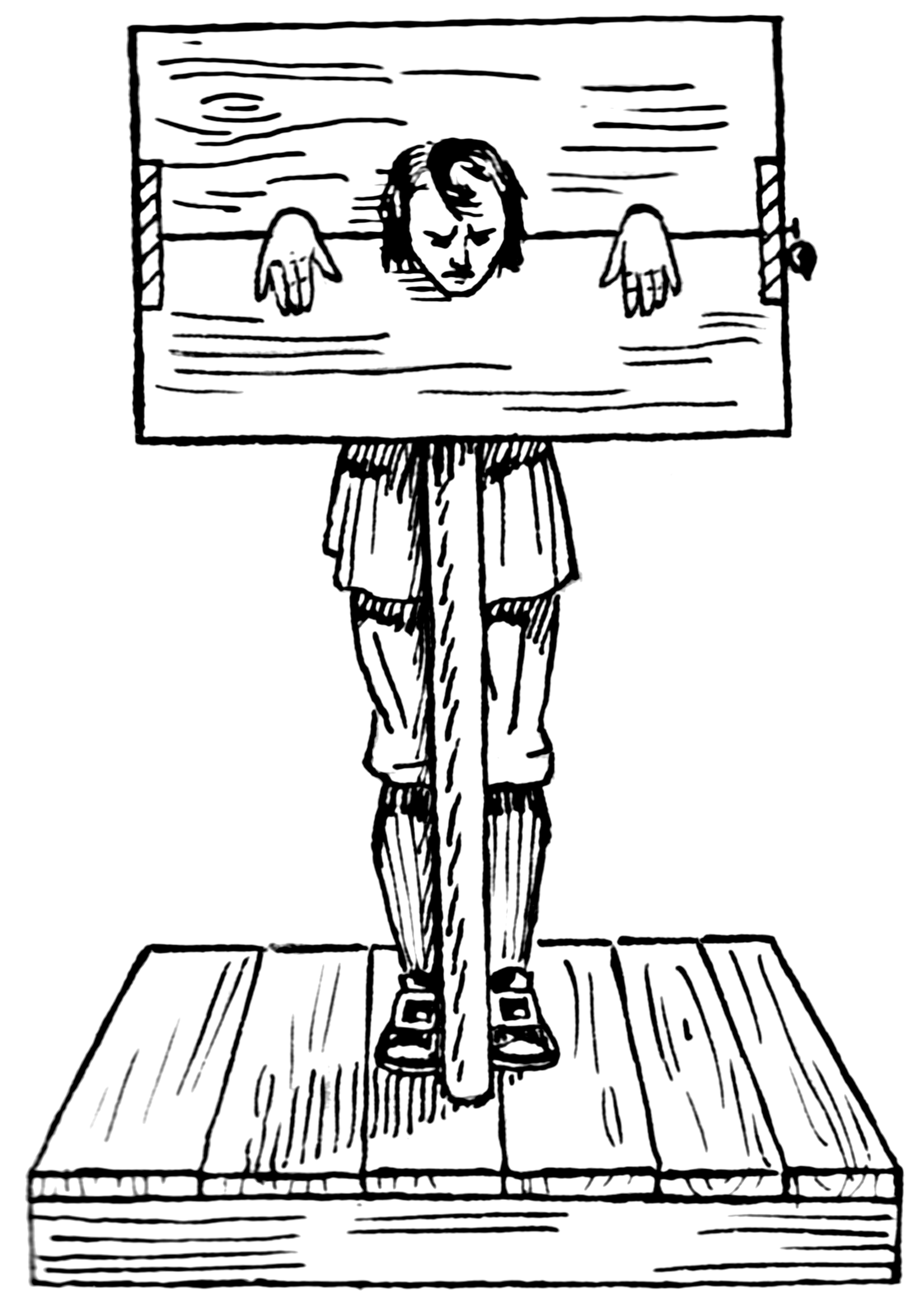
Pillories were a common form of punishment.

Public humiliation exists in many forms. In general, a criminal sentenced to one of many forms of this punishment could expect themselves be placed (restrained) in a central, public, or open location so that their fellow citizens could easily witness the sentence and, in some cases, participate as a form of "mob justice".

Just like painful forms of corporal punishment, it has parallels in educational and other rather private punishments (but with some audience), in school or domestic disciplinary context, and as a rite of passage. Physical forms include being forced to wear some sign such as "donkey ears" (simulated in paper, as a sign one is—or at least behaved—proverbially stupid), wearing a dunce cap, having to stand, kneel or bend over in a corner, or repeatedly write something on a blackboard ("I will not spread rumors", for example). Here different levels of physical discomfort can be added, such as having to hold heavy objects, or kneeling on an uneven surface. Like physical punishment and harsh hazing, these have become controversial in most modern societies, in many cases leading to legal restrictions and/or (sometimes voluntary) abolishment.

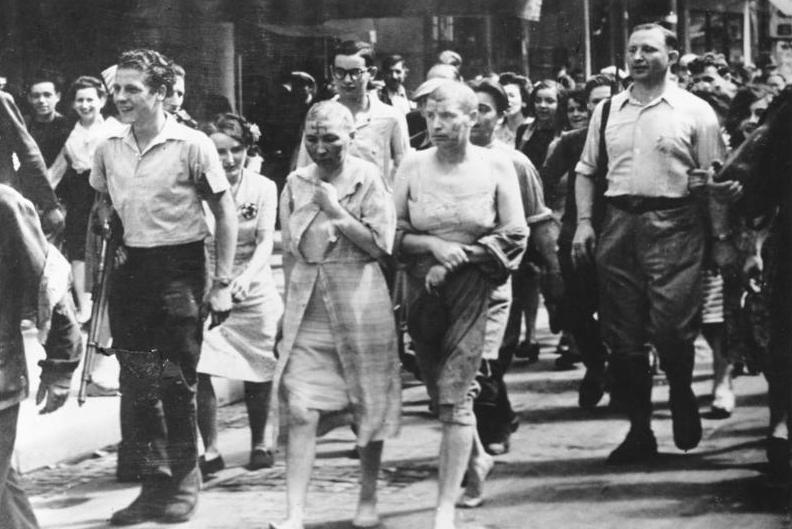
Paris, 1944: French women accused of collaboration with Nazis had their heads shaved and were paraded through the streets barefoot.

Head shaving can be a humiliating punishment prescribed in law, but also something done as "mob justice"—a stark example of which was the thousands of European women who had their heads shaved in front of cheering crowds in the wake of World War II, as punishment for associating with occupying Nazis during the war. Public shaving was applied to (true or alleged) collaborators after the Allies liberated occupied territories from the Nazi troops.

Further means of public humiliation and degradation consist in forcing people to wear typifying clothes, which can be penitential garb or prison uniforms. Forcing arrestees or prisoners to wear restraints (such as handcuffs or shackles) may also increase public humiliation. In countries such as Japan, France, and South Korea, handcuffs on arrested persons are blurred in media broadcasts and hidden wherever possible to prevent feelings of "personal shame" in the accused and to make the public more likely to maintain a presumption of innocence before trial.

Forcing people to go barefoot has been used as a more subtle form of humiliation in past and present cultures. The exposure of bare feet has served as an indicator for imprisonment and slavery throughout ancient and modern history. Even today prisoners officially have to go barefoot in many countries of the world and are also presented in court and in public unshod.

== Corporal punishment ==
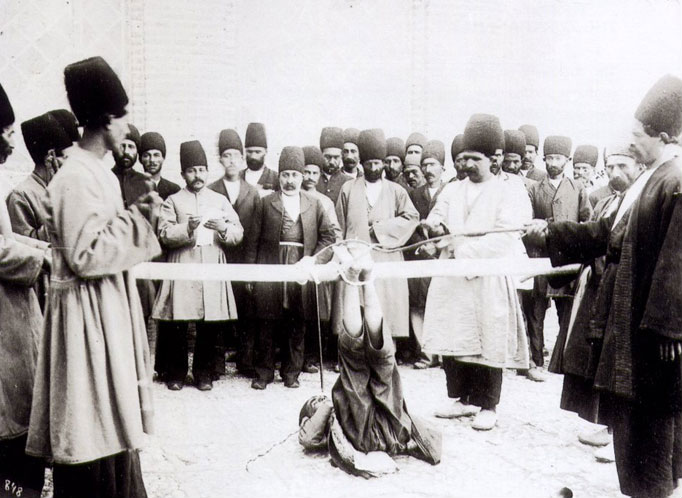
Public foot whipping in Iran

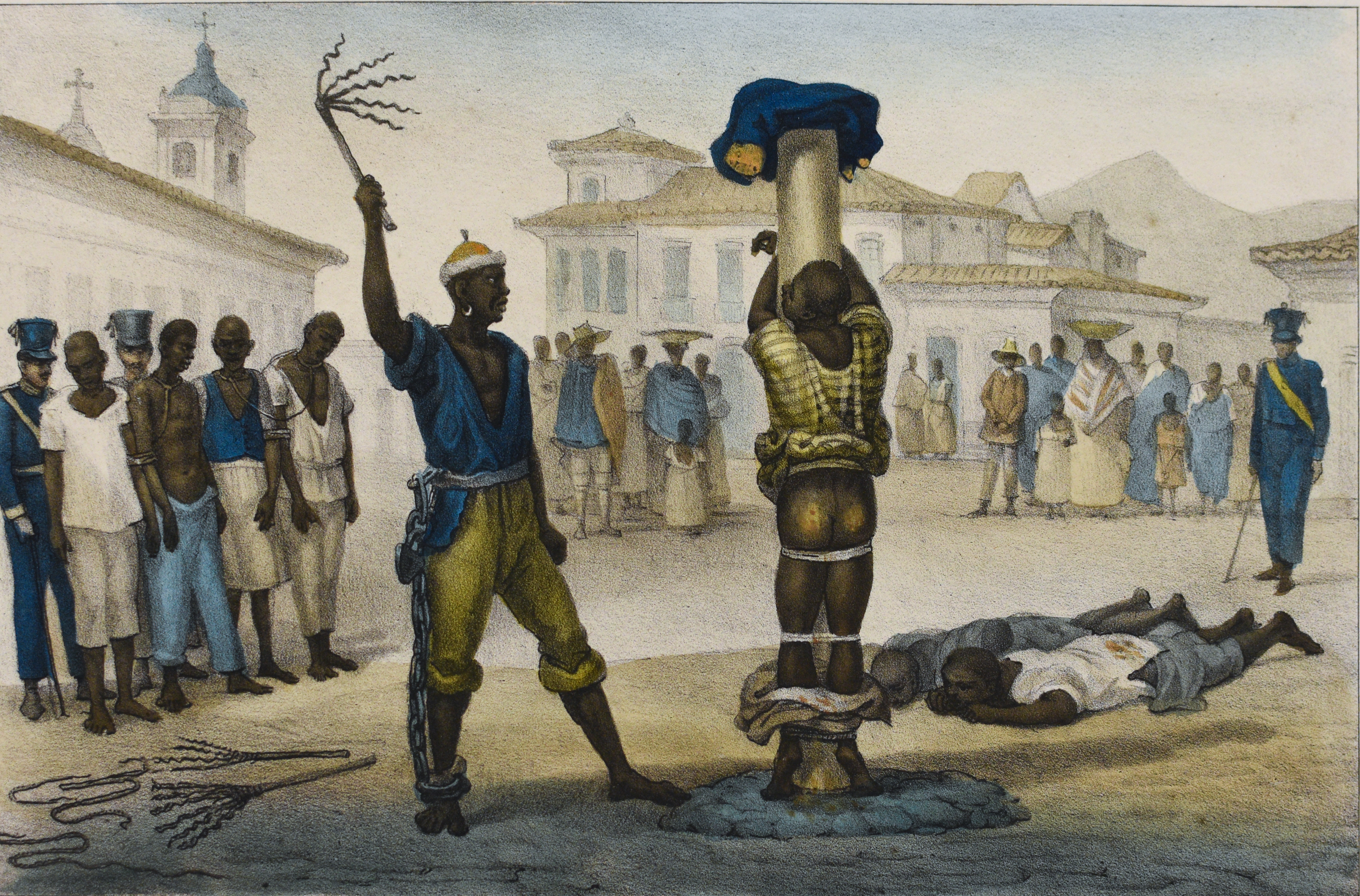
Public flogging in Brazil, Jean-Baptiste Debret

Apart from specific methods essentially aiming at humiliation, several methods combine pain and humiliation or even death and humiliation. In some cases, the pain—or at least discomfort—is insignificant or rather secondary to the humiliation.

=== Public punishment ===
The simplest is to administer painful corporal punishment in public—the major aim may be deterrence of potential offenders—so the public will witness the perpetrator's fear and agony. This can either take place in a town square or other public gathering location such as a school, or take the form of a procession through the streets. This was not uncommon in the sentences to Staupenschlag (flagellation by whipping or birching, generally on the bare buttocks) in various European states, up into the 19th century. A naval equivalent was "Flogging round the fleet" on a raft taking a person from ship to ship for consecutive installments of a great total of lashes. In some countries, the punishment of foot whipping is executed in public to this day.

=== Torture marks ===
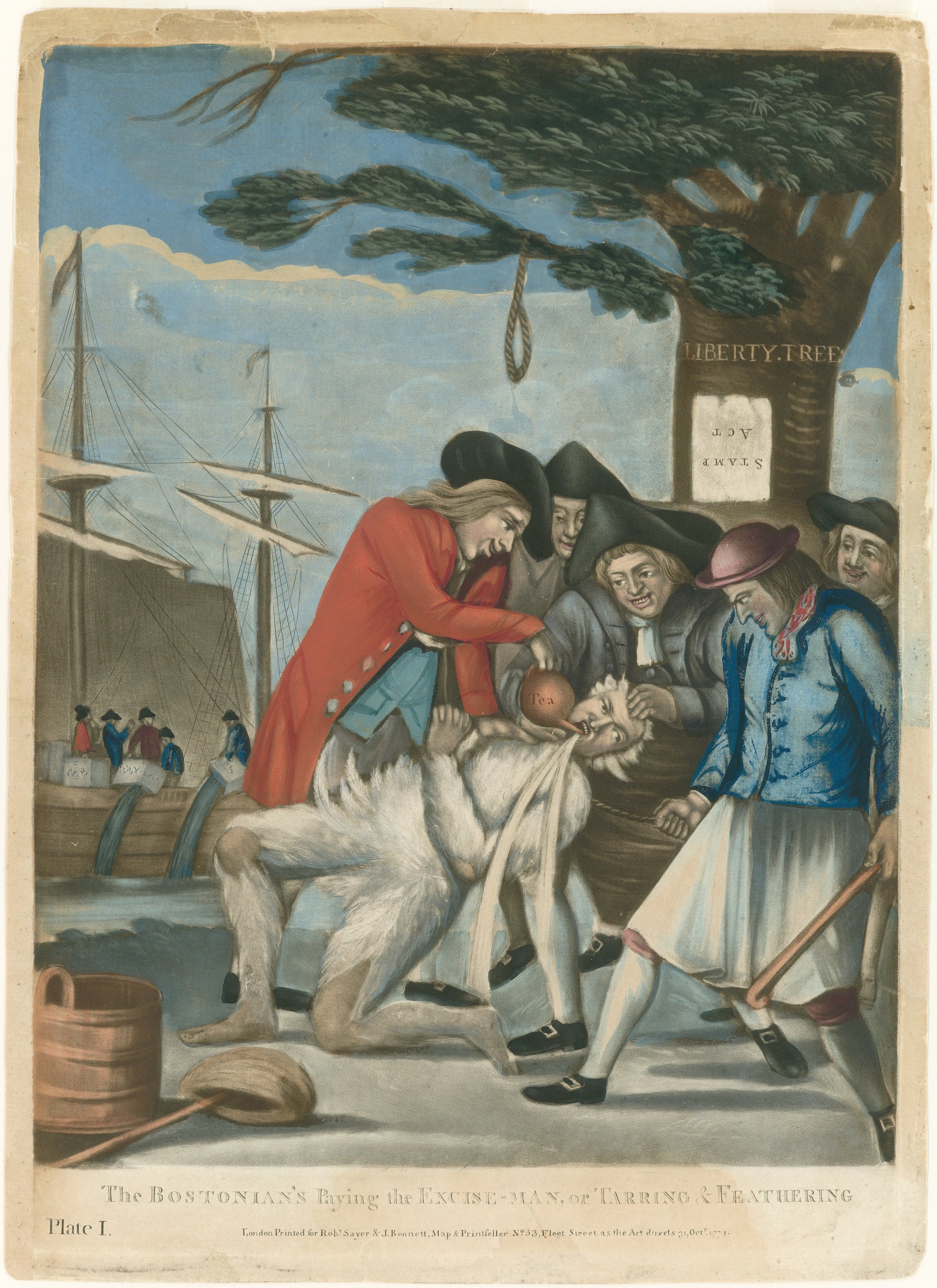
The 1774 tarring and feathering of Boston customs agent John Malcolm soon after the Boston Tea Party.

The humiliation can be extended; intentionally or not; by leaving visible marks, such as scars. This can even be the main intention of the punishment, as in the case of scarifications, such as human branding. Other examples of physical torture or modification used as public humiliation throughout history include ear cropping (starting in ancient Assyrian law and the Babylonian Code of Hammurabi and extending into the 1800s in parts of the US) and tarring and feathering.

== Psychological effects ==
Public shaming can result in negative psychological effects and devastating consequences, regardless of the punishment being justifiable or not. It could cause depression, suicidal thoughts and other severe mental problems. The humiliated individuals may develop a variety of symptoms including apathy, paranoia, anxiety, PTSD, or others. The rage and fury may arise in the persecuted individual, themselves lashing out against innocent victims, as they seek revenge or as a means of release.

== Historical examples ==
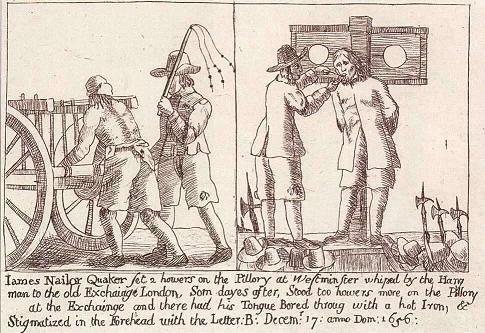
James Nayler, a prominent Quaker leader, being pilloried and whipped

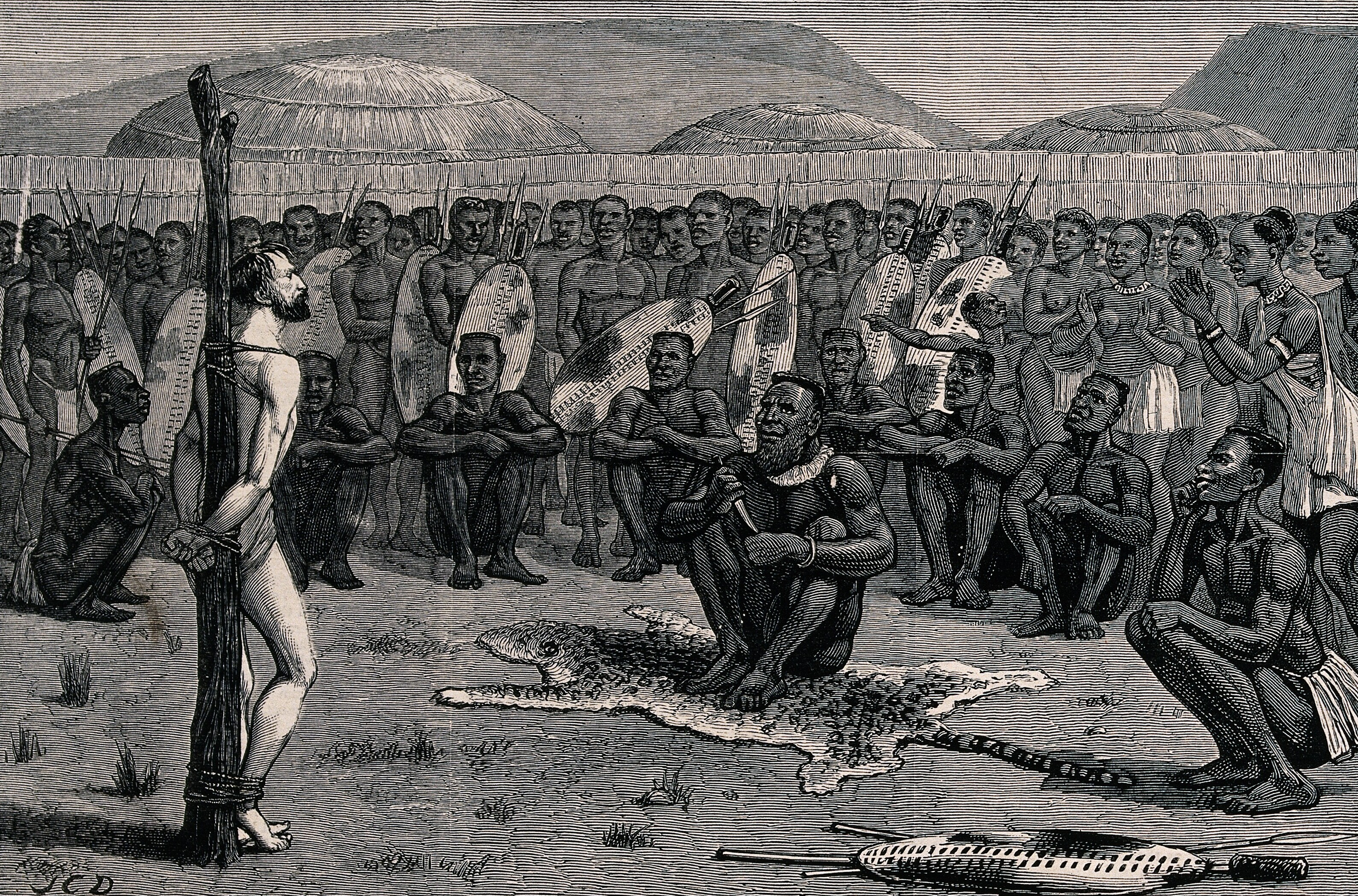
Ernest Grandier captured during the Anglo-Zulu War

- Crucifixion was used by the Romans to add public humiliation to a death penalty. Josephus describes how the Roman soldiers would crucify people naked, and using different tortuous positions as a way to further humiliate them. Crucified bodies were left to decay on the cross for weeks, and crows would come to feed on the corpses; this can be seen as post-mortem public humiliation. See also gibbeting.
- The punishment of public humiliation has taken many forms, ranging from an offender being forced to relate his crime, to the wearing of conspicuous clothing or jewelry (such as an oversized rosary (Dutch: schandstenen, "stones of shame") for someone late to church). The offender could alternatively be sentenced to remain exposed in a specific exposed place, in a restraining device such as a yoke or public stocks.
- In the Low Countries, the schandstoel ("Chair of shame"), the kaak or schandpaal ("pole of shame", a simple type of pillory), the draaikooi were customary for adulteresses, and the schopstoel, a scaffolding from which one is kicked off to land in mud and dirt.
- In the more extreme cases, being subjected to verbal and physical abuse from the crowd could have serious consequences, especially when the hands were bound, preventing self-protection. Some sentences actually prescribed additional humiliation, such as shaving, or would combine it with painful corporal punishments, see below.
- In colonial America, common forms of public humiliation were the stocks and pillory, imported from Europe. Nearly every sizable town had such instruments of public humiliation, usually at the town square. In pre-Tokugawa Japan, adulterers were publicly exposed purely to shame them.
- In Liberia, boy soldiers stripped civilian women to humiliate them; this was described with the verb phrase "to naked someone else."
- In Siam, an adulteress was paraded with a hibiscus behind the ear. Thieves were tattooed on their faces. Other criminals were paraded with a device made of woven cane on the forehead, or lengths of bamboo hung around the neck. Errant Brahmans had to wear a string of oversize beads.
- Send under the yoke was used in ancient Italy.
- Some have considered sex offender registries in the United States to be a form of public humiliation as judicial punishment. A convicted sex offender's placement on the sex offender registry is public via a state-run website in all 50 states. In 2018, a judge in the United States District Court for the District of Colorado declared Colorado's sex offender scheme as unconstitutional, citing cruel and unusual punishment. In 2020, the United States Court of Appeals for the Tenth Circuit overturned that decision.
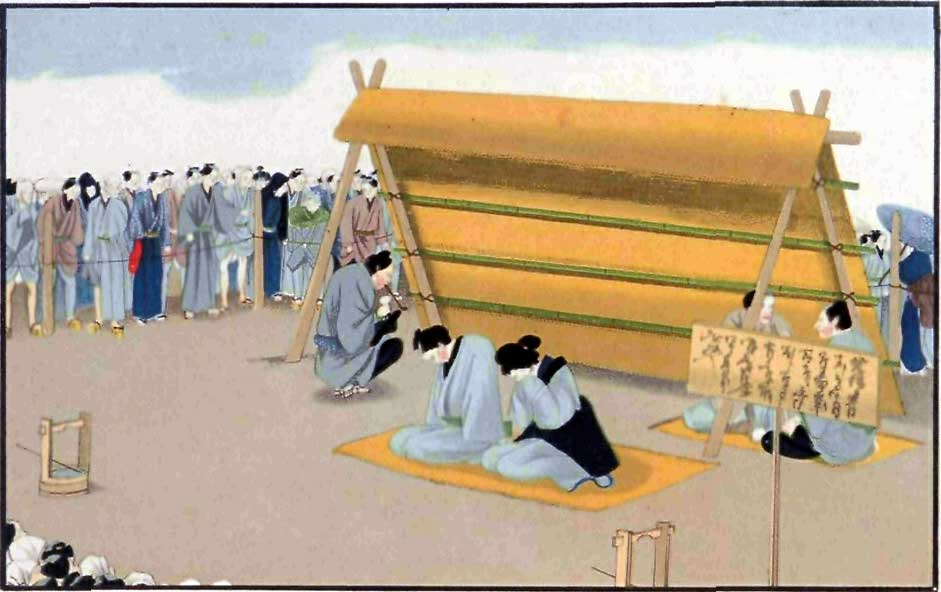
Man and woman undergoing public exposure for adultery in Japan, circa 1860.

== See also ==
- Badge of shame
- Bilboes
- Cancel culture
- Cashiering
- Charivari
- Cucking stool
- Erotic humiliation
- Humiliation
- Online shaming
- Parading on donkey
- Pillory
- Perp walk
- The Scarlet Letter
- Name and shame
- Real-name reporting
- Struggle session
- Tarring and feathering
