= Department of Primary Industries =

Department of Primary Industries or Ministry for Primary Industries refers to a type of government department:

== Australia ==
=== Federal ===
- Department of Primary Industry (1956–1974)
- Department of Primary Industry (1975–1987)
- Department of Primary Industries and Energy (1987–1988)

=== State ===
- Department of Primary Industries (Queensland)
- Department of Primary Industries (New South Wales)
- Department of Primary Industries and Regional Development (New South Wales)
- Department of Primary Industries and Regional Development (Western Australia)
- Primary Industries and Regions SA (South Australia)
- Department of Primary Industries and Water (Tasmania)
- Department of Primary Industries (Victoria)

== Brunei ==
- Ministry of Primary Resources and Tourism

== Malaysia ==
- Ministry of Plantation and Commodities, formerly Ministry of Primary Industries

== New Zealand ==
- Ministry for Primary Industries

== See also ==
- Department of Agriculture, Water and the Environment, the Australian federal department since 1 February 2020
- List of agriculture ministries
