= Real-name reporting =

Naming criminal offender on mass media

Real-name reporting is the term used primarily in Japan for the practice of mass media, when reporting an event, to clearly state the real names of the persons or organizations involved or providing information. While some consider it essential to improve the accuracy of news reporting and to monitor public authorities, others are against it from the standpoint of privacy, human rights and other issues, and there is a wide range of debate regarding the reporting of real names.

== By Country ==
=== Japan ===
In Japan, major news organizations often report under their real names. However, in recent years, police and administrative agencies have been increasingly using "anonymous reporting" in order to protect privacy. The Japan Newspaper Publishers Association (JNPA) has investigated and pointed out this problem. In addition, while the names of suspects and defendants are often reported under their real names in reports on major cases that have a large impact on society, anonymous reports are sometimes used for small cases that have little impact on society. In addition, recently, it is common for TV and newspaper reports to be posted on the Web, and some news organizations may anonymize the names of the victims and perpetrators of cases only for Web-distributed articles.

There is some concern that reporting under real names will lead to damage to the press. In particular, since the 1990s, there have been strong calls for anonymous reporting of crime victims. In response, there is a movement within the government to restrict reporting by real names, but news organizations are opposed to this, arguing that each media outlet, including newspapers, should take responsibility for its own decisions.

There is also debate over the treatment of aliases, including those of foreigners in Japan, and it is up to the mass media companies to decide whether to use only aliases, only real names, or both. In the following cases, the media often report anonymously.

Cases that do not have a major impact on society (e.g., shoplifting and other minor crimes):

- When the investigating authorities do not release the name of the person to the media (anonymous announcement)
- When it is necessary to keep the information confidential to ensure the safety of the anonymous informant It is common to interview "acquaintances of suspects" or "former officials of organizations that have caused scandals" without photographing their faces or hiding them with mosaics, or by faxing them. Voices are also sometimes changed using a voice changer. However, it has been pointed out that there is a danger that this could be a breeding ground for fabrication (see ja: TBS不二家捏造報道問題#問題となった報道内容).
- When there is a risk of reputational damage
- Cases in which the name of a company, especially a sponsoring company, would be disadvantageous.
- When the suspect is a minor in the reporting of a crime (Article 61 of the Juvenile Law and reporting of the suspect's real name)
- In principle, the acts of a person who was insane or of unsound mind at the time of the crime, or suspected to be insane or of unsound mind, shall be reported anonymously, since the legal assumption is that the sentence will be reduced or the person will be acquitted of the crime. (However, in cases where there is a fear of self-inflicted injury or harm, such as when a person is on the run, his or her real name may be reported.)
- A person who is being interviewed as a suspect or a witness in a separate arrest

Victims of criminal cases (especially sex crime cases) (victim identification matters)

=== History ===
The Asahi Shimbun has applied the "Case Reporting and Reporting 2004" as a unified guideline in its reporting since June 5, 2004, which states that "reporting should still start from real names," but also states in "Chapter 4: When Considering Anonymity" that "In principle, we report the juveniles (minors) and insane who caused the incident anonymously. However, if a juvenile is 18 years of age or older at the time of the crime and is sentenced to death, his or her real name will be used in the reporting of the crime at that time, and if a person of unsound mind is prosecuted, his or her real name will be used in the reporting of the crime.

In a feature article reporting on this guideline, the author explains the reason for allowing the reporting of the real names of juveniles on death row: "While the possibility of rehabilitation and reintegration into society basically disappears (when a death sentence is confirmed), it is customary that cases involving juveniles who are sentenced to death at the time of the crime are extremely serious. In order to monitor the use of power, it must be made clear to the public (regardless of whether the offender was an adult or a juvenile at the time of the crime) to whom the death penalty, which legally deprives a person of life, will be carried out. He also commented, "There have been very few cases so far, and the acquittal of a death-row inmate in a retrial is a significant historical news in itself, which should be recorded in history along with his actual name. The reporting of the names of those who have been executed, not at the time of execution but at the time of confirmation, will open up the possibility of discovering new evidence and of a public movement for retrial, in the event that they are found innocent. In order to clarify the difference between the concepts of the mentally ill and the insane, he added, "The mentally ill do not equal the insane. The treatment of mental illnesses has advanced dramatically, and the easy use of anonymity may preserve prejudice against the mentally disabled in general. In addition to considering the use of real names, we would also like to report on the background of the case, including the signs of the incident and the responses of those around the victim, in an effort to change the prejudice itself.

In 2011, the death sentences were confirmed for the three main suspects in the Osaka, Aichi, and Gifu serial lynching murders, all of whom were 18 or 19 years old at the time of the crimes. The media reported their real names. NHK stated that "the four victims were killed one after another, a heinous and serious crime that is of great public interest," and that "with the death sentences for the former juveniles now confirmed, the possibility of their rehabilitation and reintegration into society has virtually disappeared," while the Asahi Shimbun stated that "those sentenced to death should be clear about who they are taking their lives. In response, Kenji Utsunomiya, president of the Japan Federation of Bar Associations, issued a statement saying, "This is a violation of the Juvenile Law and is extremely regrettable.

In 2012, the Supreme Court of Japan sentenced the defendant, who was a juvenile (18 years old) at the time of the Hikari City mother and child murders, to death. The majority of the major mass media reported the real names of the condemned. The reasons for this:

- The Japan Broadcasting Corporation (NHK) cited "the high public interest in this heinous and serious crime in which a housewife and her young child were murdered" and "the fact that the former juvenile's death sentence has been confirmed by the verdict, which means that the possibility of his rehabilitation and reintegration into society has virtually disappeared.
- Jiji Press stated that the decision was the result of a "comprehensive judgment based on the fact that the possibility of rehabilitation has been eliminated by the death penalty becoming final, the seriousness of the case, and other factors.
- The Asahi Shimbun said the decision was "based on the judgment that the subjects of the punishment, whose lives will be taken by the state, should be made clear.
- The Yomiuri Shimbun stated that the reason was that "once a person is sentenced to death, there is no chance for rehabilitation (reintegration into society), but it is a matter of grave social concern as to who is the target of the death penalty for taking a person's life by the state.
- The Sankei Shimbun stated that "the death penalty is effectively fixed, and the opportunity for rehabilitation based on reintegration into society will be lost," and that this was the result of "taking into consideration the seriousness of the case.
- The Nihon Keizai Shimbun stated that the court took into consideration "the seriousness of the death sentence for the defendant, who was a juvenile at the time of the crime, as well as the fact that the defendant will lose his chance for rehabilitation.

According to the revision of the Juvenile Law, as of April 1, 2022, if an 18- or 19-year-old (specified juvenile) commits a crime punishable by death, life, or imprisonment for one year or more, his or her real name and photo can be reported once the case is sent back from the family court and prosecution is completed. It is up to each company to decide whether or not to report the actual names of the offenders. For example, when the 19-year-old defendant in the Kofu City murder and arson case in October 2021 was indicted on April 8 of the following year, NHK and the five major newspapers reported his real name, but the Chunichi Shimbun did not.

==== Privacy Act ====
Relevant Japanese Laws and Regulations

Therefore, even if the reporting of real names by these media organizations appears to constitute a violation of the obligations, etc. of business operators handling personal information, it is generally considered that no violation of the Personal Information Protection Law will arise.

==== Juvenile Law Article 61 and Real Name Reporting ====
In addition, there is a precedent that "the person's identity can be inferred" means "something that is inferable to an unspecified number of members of the public" and does not mean "something that is inferable to the people involved in the case or to the neighbors. A similar concept can be found in the United Nations Minimum Standards for the Administration of Juvenile Justice (Beijing Regulations) and the Convention on the Rights of the Child.

Since these provisions also relate to the public's right to know and freedom of expression (freedom of the press), mutual accommodation among the fundamental human rights is important. In general, both are important rights guaranteed under the Constitution, and it is not possible to assert that one takes absolute precedence over the other.

In the case of the 1998 Sakai City street riot incident, a lawsuit seeking damages and an apology advertisement from Shinchosha, which reported the male assailant whose real name was reported in the monthly magazine "Shincho 45," was won by Shinchosha at the Osaka High Court in 2000 and became a final judgment after the plaintiff did not appeal the decision.

The revised Juvenile Law enacted on May 21, 2021 (in the 204th session of the Diet), along with the Civil Code revision that raised the age of adulthood to 18, defines 18- and 19-year-olds as "specified juveniles" and lifts the ban on reporting their real names after prosecution (to take effect on April 1, 2022). The revised law also includes "cases in which there is a high public demand for publicity and the impact on the defendant's sound upbringing and rehabilitation is relatively small," even in cases other than those subject to jury trial. In the Kofu City murder and arson case that occurred in October 2021, the public prosecutor's office publicly announced the name of the defendant, a specific juvenile, for the first time.

=== United Kingdom and the United States ===
The United Kingdom and the United States are active in reporting real names. In the UK, although contempt of court laws prohibit reporting that could prejudice a jury, real names are allowed. For example, in a serial murder case involving prostitutes, the victim, as well as the victim's family and friends, are all reported by name. Even in juvenile cases, the real names of the victims are reported. Even in cases where the suspects are arrested but denied charges and not prosecuted, their real names are reported. In addition to the emphasis on "making the story about human beings," the distinction is made that while there is a "right to know" that a person has been a suspect or has a criminal record, there is no right to discriminate against such a person.

In the US, freedom of speech is strongly guaranteed by the First Amendment to the Constitution, and real-name reporting is the rule.

This idea stems from the principle of "Open Justice," which states that citizens can be monitored by revealing the process by which power is exercised. It is also considered a violation of human rights to conceal information about arrests and detentions. In general, however, the emphasis tends to be placed on court reports rather than news coverage of arrests.

In addition, individual claims for compensation for damages are also popular, and if the damage is obvious, the mass media is held responsible for compensation or punished by the licensing authority. In the case of the US, a punitive damages system exists, and it is possible to be ordered to pay huge amounts of compensation that far exceed the actual damages.

There are restrictions on media coverage of juvenile cases. In the UK, as a rule, cases involving juveniles under the age of 18 are anonymous, while in the US, it varies from state to state. However, in major cases, real names are often published due to public opinion.

In recent years, crime reporting has become increasingly overheated in both countries, and sensationalist coverage by the tabloids can be controversial.

In the US, the names of presidents, voters, presidents of publicly traded companies, employees, etc. are all reported under the same real names, even those of high school students and other minors. Anonymity or pseudonymity is not used unless there is a good reason for it, as it undermines the credibility of the article.

In the US in the 2010s, reporting the real name of a suspect in a shooting incident has raised concerns about the possibility of copycats and glorification of the perpetrator; in the Midland shooting in 2019, there were instances where the local police chief refused to release the name of the perpetrator at a press conference.

In June 2021, the Associated Press outlets will no longer name juvenile suspects for minor offences.

=== South Korea ===
Before 1998, it was common in South Korea to publicly report the names and faces of criminal suspects. However, a 1998 Supreme Court of Korea ruling made this impossible.

Similar to China, nearly anonymous reporting with "only the first name (surname)", e.g. "a certain Mr Lee", "a certain suspect Lee" (in South Korea, many people have the same surname, so it is nearly anonymous). However, the same applies to unusual surnames, such as two-letter surnames (e.g. Namgung), which some consider to be less anonymous in general. As a consideration against this, surnames are often given as initials or pseudonyms. Suspects are worn hats and masks when being taken away and during on-site inspections. Also, real names are reported on political and business scandals.

In recent years, the increase in violent crime has led to a growing public demand for real-name reporting. In early 2009, a series of major newspapers published the real names of suspects in a series of controversial serial murder cases.

Then, at a Cabinet meeting on 14 July, the Cabinet discussed and voted on a draft amendment to the Special Act on Punishment of Certain Powerful Crimes, which would make public the real names of suspects only for crimes whose means of perpetration are brutal.

However, there is much criticism that the criteria allowing the disclosure and reporting of a suspect's face and name are excessively narrow. Because in South Korea, investigative authorities convene an identity disclosure review committee to decide whether to reveal the real name and face of suspects in serious crimes (such as murder or sex crimes against minors). Disclosure is only permitted when all the legal requirements are met, which makes the criteria excessively narrow.

In addition, one of the requirements is that "the method of the crime must have been cruel and caused serious harm", which leaves room for vague and subjective judgement. As a result, even in cases of heinous crimes that provoke widespread public outrage, it may become impossible to report the suspect's face and real-name. In addition, since suspects whose their faces and their real-names remain undisclosed are often left anonymous even after their convictions are finalized, this practice itself has become a subject of criticism.

Moreover, since the decision on whether to allow the disclosure of the suspect's real-name and face is left to the discretion of each local investigative agency, criticism is being raised that the decision on whether to disclose the real-name and face of a murder suspect is inconsistent. For example, local police have faced strong criticism after deciding not to disclose the real-name and face of a woman in her 20s who serially murdered two men between 2025 and 2026 in Seoul. Of course, in this case, the prosecution later decided to reexamine it and reveal her face and name.

There is an evaluation that South Korea is a country where criminals can live well and where criminals have a good environment to commit crimes. Because the disclosure and reporting of suspects' personal information — such as their faces and names — is so limited, critics argue that there is virtually no risk that their identities will become known, except for certain suspects or criminals whose identities are permitted public disclosure. Such protection of suspect's / criminal's personal information may apply to murder cases, and is frequently implemented for serious offenses (e.g. child abuse, robbery, fraud, etc.). As a result, there is a criticism that even if criminals commit serious crimes, citizens are difficult to monitor them to help prevent repeat offenses, if they are released from prison after serving their full term. JTBC reporter Yang Wonbo submitted a petition pointing out these issues.

=== Russia ===
In Russia, media outlets typically publish the full name and age of adult suspects as soon as an official statement is released by law enforcement authorities, such as the Investigative Committee or the Ministry of Internal Affairs. There is no legal prohibition against disclosing the identities of adult suspects according to article 46 and 47 of the Russian Criminal Procedure Code. However, information about minor suspects or victims is strictly protected under Russian law (Federal Law No. 2124-1 “On Mass Media,” Article 4, Section 4), and media must avoid publishing any identifying details, instead referring to minors in general terms such as “a minor” or “a student at a local school.”

During the investigation phase, Russian media generally limit their reporting to information officially released by police or prosecutors and do not independently publish unverified details, such as confession statements. If a case proceeds to a public trial, more information may be reported, but privacy protections for minors remain in effect.

Compared to Japan, where even adult suspects are often anonymized unless the case is of major public interest, Russian practice tends toward earlier and fuller disclosure of adult suspects’ identities. However, similar to Japan, Russian media maintain strict confidentiality regarding minor suspects and victims.

=== Australia ===
Section 11 of the New South Wales (Children (Criminal Proceedings) Act 1987) prohibits the publication of the names of children involved in criminal proceedings (accused, perpetrator, victim, victim's brother or sister, witness or other person mentioned), also, the Northern Territory has legislated a presumption against reporting the real names of juveniles under 18 involved in criminal proceedings.

In May 2017, several reports said Victoria Police named or disclosed significant information about those who were suspected of, rather than charged with committing serious criminal offences in media.

In May 2020, South Australia made a change to their Evidence Act which now allows the media to publish identifying information about a defendant after the accused person’s first court appearance.

From October 2023, accused rapists and adults charged with sexual offences can be named by the media before they go to trial under Queensland law change.

=== China ===
According to China’s Personal Information Protection Law and judicial practices, even for adult suspects, the media typically do not disclose their full names, but instead use formats such as ‘last name + a certain character’ (e.g., ‘Xu certain’) or ‘pseudonym + age’ (e.g., ‘Xu certain (21 years old)’). However, in certain major cases, the full name may be disclosed. In cases involving minor suspects or victims, the media will strictly conceal details such as age and identity, and will only refer to them vaguely as ‘minor’ or ‘a certain high school student. During the investigation phase of a case, Chinese media only reprint police or prosecution reports and do not proactively disclose unverified information (such as details of the suspect’s confession). If the case enters the public trial stage, the media may report more information, but still need to comply with privacy protection requirements. For example, the Supreme People’s Procuratorate’s work reports mention the number of cases and law enforcement results but do not disclose the identities of specific suspects.

However, it is common practice to reveal the suspect's face. Only the nose area of the suspect's face is covered.

== See also ==
- Public humiliation
- Name and shame
- Mass media
- Humiliation
- Online shaming
- Human rights in Japan
