= Department of Primary Industries (New South Wales) =

State government department in Australia

New South Wales Department of Primary Industries

Agency overview
- Formed: 4 April 2011
- Dissolved: 30 June 2024
- Superseding agency: Department of Primary Industries and Regional Development
- Jurisdiction: New South Wales
- Headquarters: 105 Prince Street, Orange, New South Wales, Australia
- Agency executive: Scott Hansen, Director-General
- Parent agency: Department of Regional NSW
- Child agencies: Forestry Corporation NSW; NSW Food Authority
- Website: www.dpi.nsw.gov.au

The New South Wales Department of Primary Industries (DPI) was an agency of the New South Wales Government, responsible for the administration and development for agriculture, fisheries, aquaculture, forestry, and biosecurity in New South Wales. The DPI worked to drive innovation in primary industries to improve resilience, productivity and sustainability, and to ensure risks are managed for natural resources, farming and food.

Despite its name, the DPI ceased to be a department of the New South Wales government in July 2011, when it became part of the Department of Planning, Industry and Environment and then, in April 2020, the Department of Regional NSW. On 1 July 2024, the DPI was abolished and merged into the Department of Regional NSW, with the latter renamed Department of Primary Industries and Regional Development.

The DPI head office was located in Orange.

== Structure ==
=== Leadership ===
The DPI was led by its director-general, the last being Scott Hansen, who reported to the Minister for Agriculture. Hansen was removed from the role in January 2024 due to the impending abolition of DPI.

The DPI sat within the wider portfolio of the Department of Regional NSW, led by its secretary Rebecca Fox at the time of the abolition of the DPI.

=== Divisions ===
As of July 2020, the DPI consists of the following divisions:

- DPI Agriculture
- DPI Biosecurity and Food Security
- DPI Fisheries
- DPI Investment and Business Development
- DPI Engagement and Industry Assistance
- DPI Research Excellence

== Legislation ==
The DPIs powers are principally drawn from a range of legislation including the Biosecurity Act (2015) (NSW), Agricultural Industry Services Act (1998), Biological Control Act (1985), Forestry Act (1916), and Fisheries Management Act (1994), Fisheries Act (1935) plus over sixty other acts.

== History ==
The first predecessor of the Department of Primary Industries was the Department of Mines and Agriculture, established on 3 November 1890.

The first Department of Primary Industries was formed as a government department on 1 July 2004, with the amalgamation of the Department of Agriculture, Department of Mineral Resources, NSW Fisheries, Forestry Commission and State Forests. Barry Buffier was the inaugural director-general of the department. In 2009, it was abolished and amalgamated into the Department of Industry and Investment.

On 4 April 2011, the Department of Primary Industries was re-established as a Division of the Government Service following the 2011 state election. Three months later, on 1 July 2011, the Department of Primary Services ceased to be a Division of the Government Service and became a departmental office under the Department of Trade and Investment, Regional Infrastructure, which later became Department of Industry. The Department of Industry became the Department of Planning, Industry and Environment (DPIE) in 2019.

On 2 April 2020, the Department of Regional NSW was established and the Department of Primary Industries became part of the new department.

On 3 November 2020, the DPI celebrated 130 years of its founding. On the same day, it moved its Orange office.

In January 2024, the director-general of DPI, Scott Hansen, was removed from his role with no clear explanation, amidst an internal function review of the Department of Regional NSW. The future of the DPI was also unknown until the state government announced the merger of DPI into the Department of Regional NSW in April that year. The merger took effect on 1 July 2024, with DPI abolished, and the Department of Regional NSW renamed to Department of Primary Industries and Regional Development to reflect the change.

== Headquarters ==
In 1992, the DPI headquarters moved from Sydney to 161 Kite Street, Orange by the NSW Minister for Agriculture and Rural Affairs Ian Armstrong, as part of the state government's decentralisation plan. Armstrong would later be the Deputy Premier of New South Wales from 1993 to 1995.

On 3 November 2020, the DPI headquarters moved to the newly opened Ian Armstrong Building, named after Armstrong, located on 105 Prince Street, Orange at the site of the former Orange Base Hospital. The building also houses offices of the Departments of Planning, Industry and Environment (DPIE) (and later the Department of Regional NSW), Premier and Cabinet, and Education.

== See also ==
- Department of Agriculture (Australia)
- Department of Agriculture, Fisheries and Forestry (Australia)
