= Online shaming =

Form of public shaming

Online shaming is a form of public shaming in which targets are publicly humiliated on the internet, via social media platforms (e.g. Twitter or Facebook), or more localized media (e.g. email groups). As online shaming frequently involves exposing private information on the Internet, the ethics of public humiliation has been a source of debate over Internet privacy and media ethics. Online shaming takes many forms, including call-outs, cancellation (cancel culture), doxing, negative reviews, and revenge porn.

== Description ==
Online shaming is a form of public shaming in which internet users are harassed, mocked, or bullied by other internet users online. This shaming may involve commenting directly to or about the shamed; the sharing of private messages; or the posting of private photos. Those being shamed are often accused of committing a social transgression, and other internet users then use public exposure to shame the offender.

People have been shamed online for a variety of reasons, usually consisting of some form of social transgression such as posting offensive comments, posting offensive images or memes, online gossip, or lying. Those who are shamed online have not necessarily committed any social transgression, however. Online shaming may be used to get revenge (for example, in the form of revenge pornography), stalk, blackmail, or to threaten other internet users.

Privacy violation is a major issue in online shaming. Those being shamed may be denied the right to privacy and be subject to defamation. David Furlow, chairman of the Media, Privacy and Defamation Committee of the American Bar Association, has identified the potential privacy concerns raised by websites facilitating the distribution of information that is not part of the public record (documents filed with a government agency) and has said that such websites "just [give] a forum to people whose statements may not reflect truth."

There are different philosophical perspectives on the morality of online public shaming. On the one hand, there is the view that public shaming imposes punishments that are not proportional to the offenses or alleged offenses. Martha Nussbaum similarly says that public shaming represents the "justice of the mob", but this alleged justice is not "deliberative, impartial or neutral". On the other hand, there are those who defend the value of public shaming as constructive, if done right; people who defend this view maintain that society often shames people counter-productively but that it can be tweaked or altered in order to be a valuable tool for people's improvement. For instance, holding people accountable for things that they have done wrong can be a powerful way of correcting bad behavior, but it has to be paired with a belief in the possibility of redemption. Some proponents of this approach agree with Plato's view that shame can lead to moral improvements. Everyone in this debate agrees that it is important to avoid what Nussbaum calls a "spoiled identity": to have a spoiled identity is to have the public image of someone who is irredeemable and unwelcome in a community.

Online shaming has become more visible with the rise of social media platforms, where users can quickly share information and express criticism toward individuals or organizations. Platforms such as X (social media platform) allow posts highlighting controversial behavior to spread quickly through reposts, hashtags, and comment threads, enabling large numbers of users to participate in public discussions. Because social media content can be widely circulated and archived through screenshots or reposts, incidents of online shaming may remain visible long after the original event occurred. In some cases, widespread criticism on social media has led to professional or social consequences for the individuals involved, particularly when employers, institutions, or news organizations become aware of the controversy. Researchers studying digital communication have noted that the speed and scale of online networks can amplify these events, turning relatively small incidents into widely discussed public controversies.

== Types ==
=== Call-outs and cancellation ===
Cancel culture or call-out culture describes a form of ostracism in which someone or something is thrust out of social or professional circles, either online on social media, in the real world, or both. They are said to be "canceled". Lisa Nakamura, professor of media studies at the University of Michigan, has defined cancelling as simply a "cultural boycott" in which the act of depriving someone of attention deprives them of their livelihood.

The notion of cancel culture is a variant of the term "call-out culture", and constitutes a form of boycott involving an individual (usually a celebrity) who is deemed to have acted or spoken in a questionable or controversial manner.

Cancel culture has been noted as a prominent topic of discussion in American society. Most Americans find the term more associated with social media and entertainment instead of politics. In 2021 Business Insider conducted a poll in conjunction with SurveyMonkey that asked 1,129 respondents "When you hear the term 'cancel culture,' which of the following do you most associate it with? Please select all that apply." 48% of respondents identified cancel culture with social media, 34% identified cancel culture with the entertainment industry, 31% associated it with the news media, 20% listed colleges, and 16% did not know what cancel culture was. Regarding politics, partisan splits on this issue were widespread; for instance, almost half of Republicans associated cancel culture with Democrats.

=== Doxing ===
Doxing involves researching and broadcasting personally identifiable information about an individual, often with the intention of harming that person. This information may include the person's home address, workplace or school, full name, spouse, credit card information, and phone number.

Bruce Schneier, a lecturer and fellow at Harvard Kennedy School, has elaborated that doxing does not just happen to individuals. Companies such as Sony and Ashley Madison have been involved in doxing schemes.

=== Negative reviews ===
User-generated review sites such as Yelp, Google Maps and Trip Advisor have been used to publicly shame or punish businesses. Research suggests that the quality of the review makes a difference on how the businesses assess their product, as well as the number of negative reviews received. Other studies have shown that not responding to negative reviews has better outcomes than replying to negative reviews, but businesses should reply to negative reviews to avoid other users blaming the company for the problem.

=== Revenge porn ===
Non-consensual sharing of sexually explicit material in order to humiliate a person, is frequently distributed by computer hackers or ex-partners. Images and videos of sexual acts are often combined with doxing of a person's private details, such as their home addresses and workplaces. In some jurisdictions, revenge porn is a criminal offense.

=== Social status shaming ===
Social status shaming is a form of online shaming that involves bullying others online due to their socioeconomic status. It is often utilized as a vessel for social control among classes, and has been regarded as one of the most effective models in which to examine social status and its influence on controlling those below oneself.

== Examples ==
=== Justine Sacco incident ===
Justine Sacco
(@JustineSacco)
tweeted:

Going to Africa. Hope I don't get AIDS. Just kidding. I'm white!

December 20, 2013

In December 2013, Justine Sacco, a woman with 174 Twitter followers, tweeted acerbic jokes during a plane trip from New York to Cape Town, such as "'Weird German Dude: You're in First Class. It’s 2014. Get some deodorant.' — Inner monologue as I inhale BO. Thank God for pharmaceuticals." and, in Heathrow; "Going to Africa. Hope I don't get AIDS. Just Kidding. I'm white!" Sacco, a South African herself, claimed that she intended the tweet to mock American ignorance of South Africa, and in a later interview expressed that her intention was to "mimic—and mock what an actual racist, ignorant person would say." Sacco slept during her 11-hour plane trip, and woke up to find out that she had lost her job and was the number-one Twitter topic worldwide, with celebrities and new media bloggers all over the globe denouncing her and encouraging all their followers to do the same. Sacco's employer, New York internet firm IAC, declared that she had lost her job as Director of Corporate Communications. People began tweeting "Has Justine landed yet?", expressing schadenfreude at the loss of her career. Sam Biddle, the Gawker Media blogger who promoted the #HasJustineLandedYet hashtag, later apologised for his role, admitting that he did so for Internet traffic to his blog, and noting that "it's easy and thrilling to hate a stranger online."

According to journalist Jon Ronson, the public does not understand that a vigilante campaign of public shaming, undertaken with the ostensible intention of defending the underdog, may create a mob mentality capable of destroying the lives and careers of the public figures singled out for shaming. Ronson argued that in the early days of Twitter, people used the platform to share intimate details of their lives, and not as a vehicle of shaming. Brooke Gladstone argued that the Sacco affair may deter people from expressing themselves online due to a fear of being misinterpreted. Kelly McBride argues that journalists play a key role in expanding the shame and humiliation of targets of the campaigns by relaying claims to a larger audience, while justifying their actions as simply documenting an event in an impartial manner. She writes: "Because of the mob mentality that accompanies public shaming events, often there is very little information about the target, sometimes only a single tweet. Yet there is a presumption of guilt and swift move toward justice, with no process for ascertaining facts." McBride further notes, "If newspapers ran front-page photos of adulterers in the Middle East being stripped naked and whipped in order to further their shame, we would criticize them as part of a backward system of justice." Ben Adler compared the Sacco incident to a number of Twitter hoaxes, and argued that the media needs to be more careful to fact-check articles and evaluate context.

=== Ashley Madison data breach ===
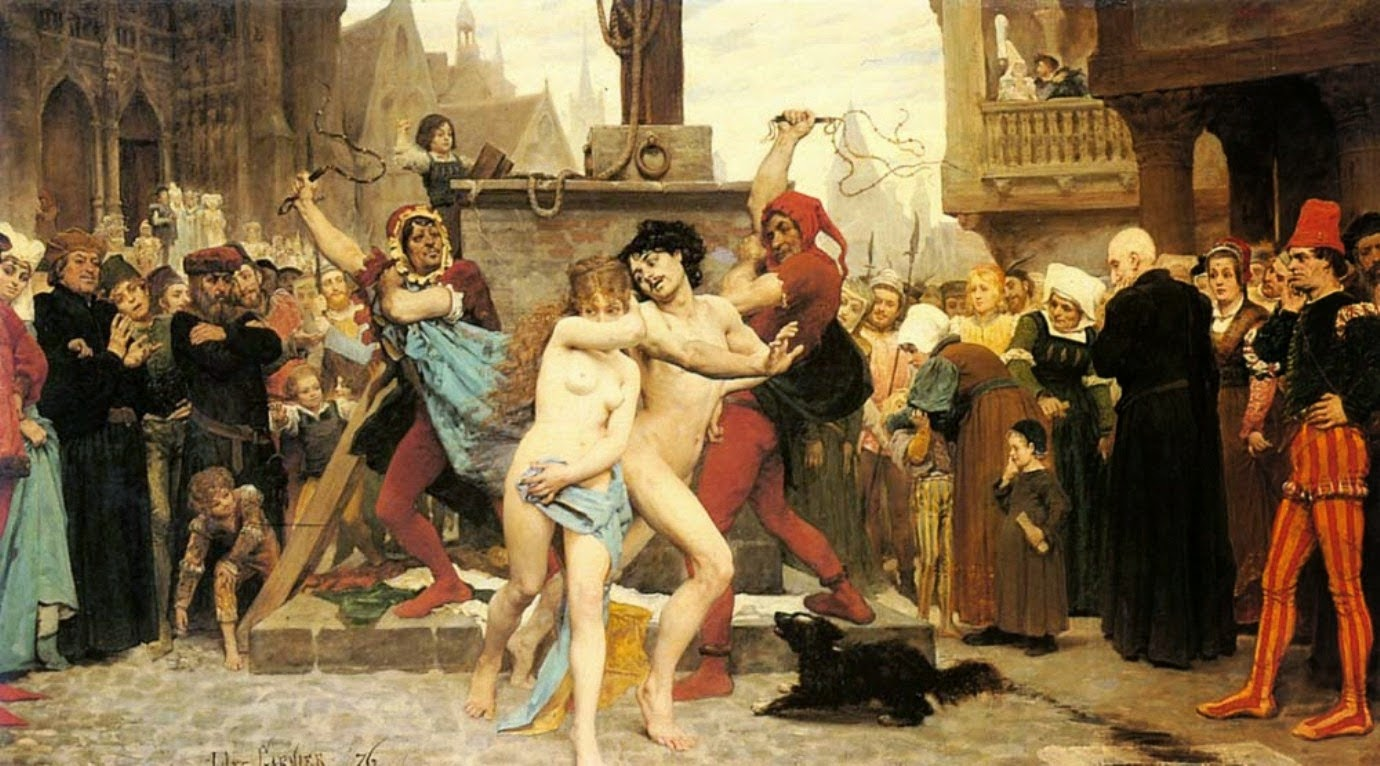
Online shaming has been characterized as the equivalent of flogging in the town square.

In July 2015, a group hacked the user data of Ashley Madison, a commercial dating website marketed as facilitating extramarital affairs. In August 2015, over 30 million user account details—including names and email addresses—were released publicly.

A variety of security researchers and Internet privacy activists debated the ethics of the release.

Clinical psychologists argue that dealing with an affair in a particularly public way increases the pain for spouses and children. Carolyn Gregoire argued "[s]ocial media has created an aggressive culture of public shaming in which individuals take it upon themselves to inflict psychological damage" and more often than not, "the punishment goes beyond the scope of the crime." Charles J. Orlando, who had joined the site to conduct research on women who cheat, said that he felt users of the site were anxious about the release of sexually explicit messages that would humiliate their spouses and children. He wrote that it is alarming that "the mob that is the Internet is more than willing to serve as judge, jury, and executioner" and members of the site "don't deserve a flogging in the virtual town square with millions of onlookers."

=== Tim Hunt controversy ===
In 2015, British biochemist Sir Tim Hunt, who won the 2001 Nobel Prize in Physiology or Medicine, was involved in a highly publicized controversy at the World Conference of Science Journalists (WCSJ) in Seoul. At a lunch for female journalists and scientists, Hunt gave a speech on short notice which was later recounted by an unnamed EU official:

It's strange that such a chauvinist monster like me has been asked to speak to women scientists. Let me tell you about my trouble with girls. Three things happen when they are in the lab: you fall in love with them, they fall in love with you, and when you criticise them they cry. Perhaps we should make separate labs for boys and girls? Now, seriously, I'm impressed by the economic development of Korea. And women scientists played, without a doubt, an important role in it. Science needs women, and you should do science, despite all the obstacles, and despite monsters like me.

In the audience were science journalists Connie St Louis, Deborah Blum and Ivan Oransky, who found Hunt's remarks highly inappropriate. They decided to publicize his remarks on Twitter, giving St Louis the task of writing a short text to be tweeted and corroborated by the other two. The tweet called Hunt sexist and said he had "utterly ruined" the luncheon.

St Louis's tweet went viral, setting off what The Observer described as a "particularly vicious social media campaign." The Royal Society quickly distanced itself from Hunt's comments as reported and emphasized its commitment to equality in the sciences. To ridicule the "sexist scientist", the online feminist magazine The Vagenda urged female scientists to post mundane pictures of themselves at work under the hashtag "#distractinglysexy".

Two days after the speech, Hunt gave a BBC radio interview saying "I did mean the part about having trouble with girls. It is true that I have fallen in love with people in the lab, and that people in the lab have fallen in love with me, and it's very disruptive to science. It's terribly important that, in the lab, people are on a level playing field. And I found these emotional entanglements made life very difficult. I mean, I'm really, really sorry that I caused any offence – that's awful. I certainly didn't mean – I just meant to be honest, actually." Hunt went on to say "I'm very sorry if people took offense. I certainly did not mean to demean women, but rather be honest about my own shortcomings."

Numerous media outlets reported on the incident and the interview, citing portions of Hunt's original remarks and criticizing them as sexist. The editors of Nature called on "all involved in science [to] condemn the comments". Hunt felt he had made it clear he was joking because he had included the phrase "now seriously" in his statement. The reconstruction of his words by an unnamed EU official corroborated the inclusion of these words.

On June 10 Hunt resigned from his position as an honorary professor with the University College London's Faculty of Life Sciences and from the Royal Society's Biological Sciences Awards Committee. Hunt's wife, immunologist Mary Collins, had been told by a senior [at UCL] that Hunt "had to resign immediately or be sacked". He was consequently required to step down from the science committee of the European Research Council.

Jonathan Dimbleby resigned from an honorary fellowship at UCL in protest of UCL's treatment of Hunt. Author and journalist Jeremy Hornsby wrote University College London out of his will in protest, leaving it "about £100,000 worse off".

Following Hunt's resignation, at least eight Nobel prizewinning scientists and 21 honorary fellows criticized his treatment. Boris Johnson, the mayor of London at that time, and evolutionary biologist Richard Dawkins, expressed similar indignation. A few scientists, such as Hunt's co-Nobelist, Paul Nurse, were critical of Hunt's conduct and said that his resignation was warranted.

In a letter to The Times a group of 29 staff scientists, students and postdoctoral fellows, both male and female, who had worked with Hunt, wrote in support of his character. They described how his help had been "instrumental in the advancement of many other women and men in science beyond those in his own lab" and how he had "actively encouraged an interest in science in schoolchildren and young scientists, arranging for work experience and summer students of both genders to get their first taste of research in his lab". They urged the ERC and UCL to "reconsider their rush to judgment".

Hunt has distanced himself from the controversy, commenting that he had been "turned into a straw man that one lot loves to love and the other lot loves to hate and then they just take up sides and hurled utterly vile abuse at everyone".

=== "Shirtstorm" controversy ===
In November 2014, while giving a televised status update on the Rosetta spacecraft, Matt Taylor wore a shirt depicting scantily-clad cartoon women with firearms made by his friend, a female artist. Taylor's decision to wear the shirt to a press conference drew criticism from a number of commentators, who saw a reflection of a culture where women are unwelcome in scientific fields (see gender inequality). Others, including Boris Johnson, Julie Bindel and Tim Stanley, argued against such criticism. The woman who made the shirt for Taylor as a birthday present stated that she "did not expect" the shirt to attract the level of attention that it did. Taylor later made a public apology, saying: "The shirt I wore this week – I made a big mistake, and I offended many people. And I'm very sorry about this". Some writers expressed appreciation for Taylor's apology. A campaign was set up on the crowdfund website Indiegogo, with the objective of raising $3,000 to buy Taylor a gift, as a token of the public's appreciation for the work that he and the team had done. The campaign raised a total of $24,003, of which $23,000 was donated to UNAWE at Taylor's request, the remainder going towards a plaque commemorating the mission.

=== Hypatia transracialism controversy ===
The feminist philosophy journal Hypatia became involved in a dispute in April 2017 that led to the online shaming of one of its authors. The journal published an article about transracialism by Rebecca Tuvel, an assistant professor of philosophy, comparing the situation of Caitlyn Jenner, a trans woman, to that of Rachel Dolezal, a white woman who identifies as black. The article was criticized on Facebook and Twitter as a source of "epistemic violence", and the author became the subject of personal attacks. Academics associated with Hypatia joined in the criticism. A member of the journal's editorial board became the point of contact for an open letter demanding that the article be retracted, and the journal's board of associate editors issued an unauthorized apology, saying the article should never have been published. Rogers Brubaker described the episode in the New York Times as an example of "internet shaming".

=== Dog Poop Girl ===
In 2005 in South Korea, bloggers targeted a woman who refused to clean up when her dog defecated on the floor of a Seoul subway car, labeling her "Dog Poop Girl" (rough translation of Korean: "개똥녀" into English). Another commuter had taken a photograph of the woman and her dog, and posted it on a popular South Korean website. Within days, she had been identified by Internet vigilantes, and much of her personal information was leaked onto the Internet in an attempt to punish her for the offense. The story received mainstream attention when it was widely reported in South Korean media. The public humiliation led the woman to drop out of her university, according to reports.

The reaction by the South Korean public to the incident prompted several newspapers in South Korea to run editorials voicing concern over Internet vigilantism. One paper quoted Daniel Solove as saying that the woman was the victim of a "cyber-posse, tracking down norm violators and branding them with digital Scarlet Letters." Another called it an "Internet witch-hunt," and went on to say that "the Internet is turning the whole society into a kangaroo court."

== See also ==
- Abusive power and control
- Anti-social behaviour
- Anti-fan
- Cancel culture
- Character assassination
- Cringe culture
- Culture of fear
- Cyberbullying
- Deplatforming
- Double standard
- Egosurfing
- Escrache
- Ghosting
- Internet troll
- Internet vigilantism
- Name and shame
- Ostracism
- Peer pressure
- Rage farming
- Real-name reporting
- Review bomb
- Scandal
- Shame campaign
- Shunning
- Smear campaign
- So You've Been Publicly Shamed
- Struggle session
- Twitter
