= Badge of shame =

Type of symbol worn for public humiliation, ostracism or persecution

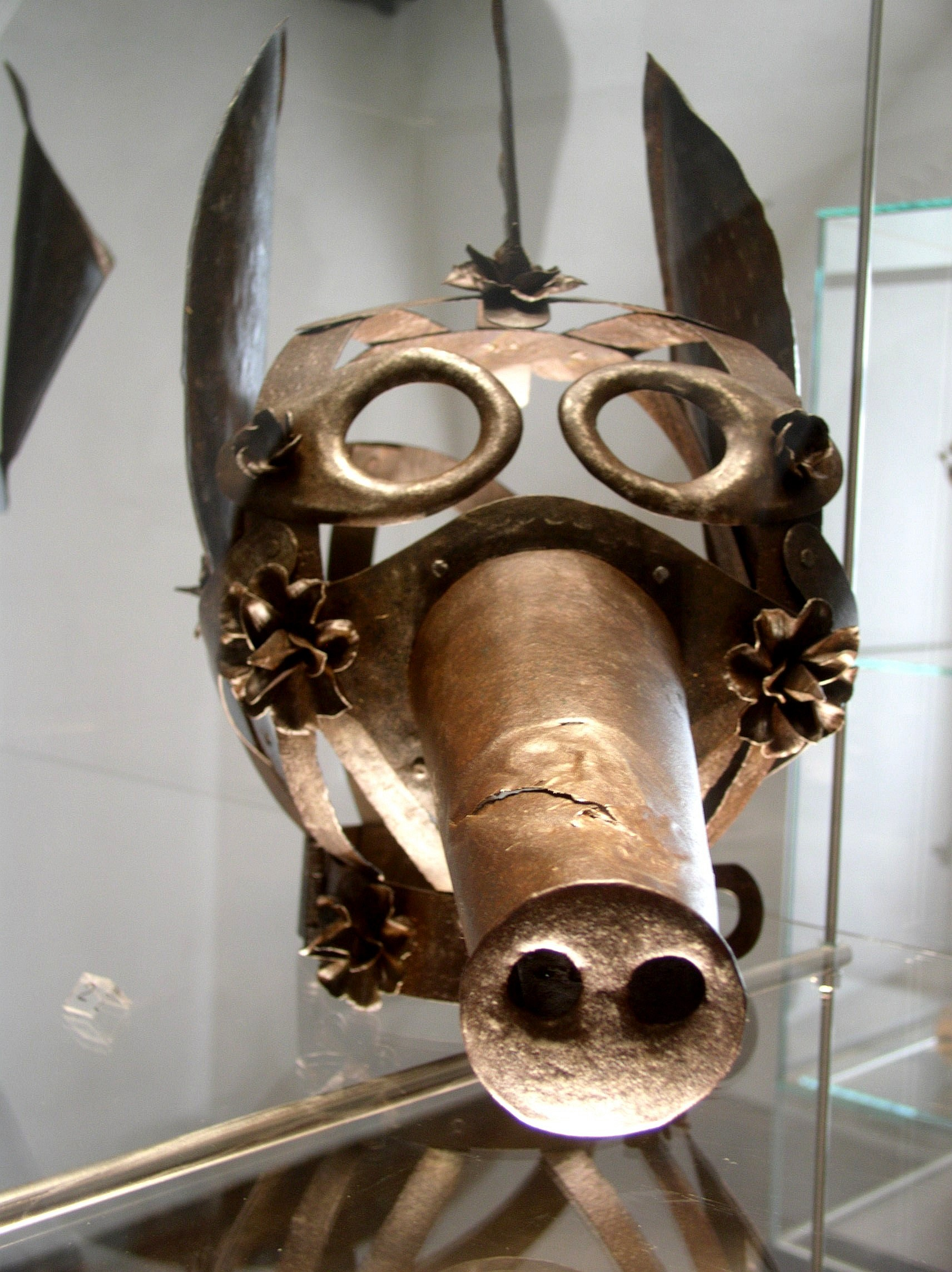
A medieval "Mask of Shame", or scold's bridle

A badge of shame, also a symbol of shame, a mark of shame or a stigma, is a distinctive symbol required to be worn by a specific group or an individual for the purpose of public humiliation, ostracism or persecution.

The term is also used metaphorically, especially in a pejorative sense, to characterize something associated with a person or group as shameful.

In England, under the Poor Act 1697, paupers who received parish relief were required to wear a badge of blue or red cloth on the shoulder of the right sleeve in an open and visible manner, in order to discourage people from collecting relief unless they were desperate. While many would be willing to collect relief, fewer would be willing to do so if required to wear the "shameful" mark of the poor in public.

The yellow badge that Jews were required to wear in parts of Europe during the Middle Ages, and later in Nazi Germany and German-occupied Europe, was effectively a badge of shame, as well as identification. Other identifying marks may include making shamed people go barefoot.

The biblical "Mark of Cain" can be interpreted as synonymous with a badge of shame.

== History ==
=== Depilation ===
Punitive depilation of men, especially burning off pubic hair, was intended as a mark of shame in ancient Mediterranean cultures where male body hair was valued. Women who committed adultery were also forced to wear specific icons or marks, or had their hair shorn, as a badge of shame. Many women who fraternized with the occupiers in German-occupied Europe had their heads shaved by angry mobs of their peers after liberation by the Allies of World War II.

During World War II, the Nazis also used head shaving as a mark of shame to punish Germans like the youthful non-conformists known as the Edelweiss Pirates.

=== Clothing ===
Cathar yellow cross for radicals

In Ancient Rome, both men and women originally wore the toga, but over time matrons adopted the stola as the preferred form of dress, while prostitutes retained the toga. Later, under the Lex Julia, women convicted of prostitution were forced to wear a toga muliebris, as the prostitute's badge of shame.

Starting in the 8th century, Jews and Christians living under the Abbasid Caliphate were frequently compelled to wear distinctive markings on their clothes to signify their status as a follower of a dhimmi faith, which often varied between the eras of different rulers. Underneath Caliph Harun al-Rashid the use of yellow belts or fringes on the clothing were used to signify dhimmi status, while during the rule of Caliph al-Mutawakkil, patches in the shape of donkeys were worn by Jews and patches in the shape of pigs were worn by Christians.

These symbols of identification held the primary function of marking individuals as belonging to the dhimmi minorities, which required them to pay a special tax. Thus, they marked individuals as socially inferior to Muslims and could act as a target for persecution during periods of unrest.

At the beginning of the 13th century, Pope Innocent III prohibited Christians from causing Jews bodily harm, but supported their segregation in society. On at least one occasion, he likened this to the fate of Cain as it is described in the Book of Genesis, writing to the Count of Nevers:

The Lord made Cain a wanderer and a fugitive over the earth, but set a mark upon him,... as wanderers must [the Jews] remain upon the earth, until their countenance be filled with shame...

—

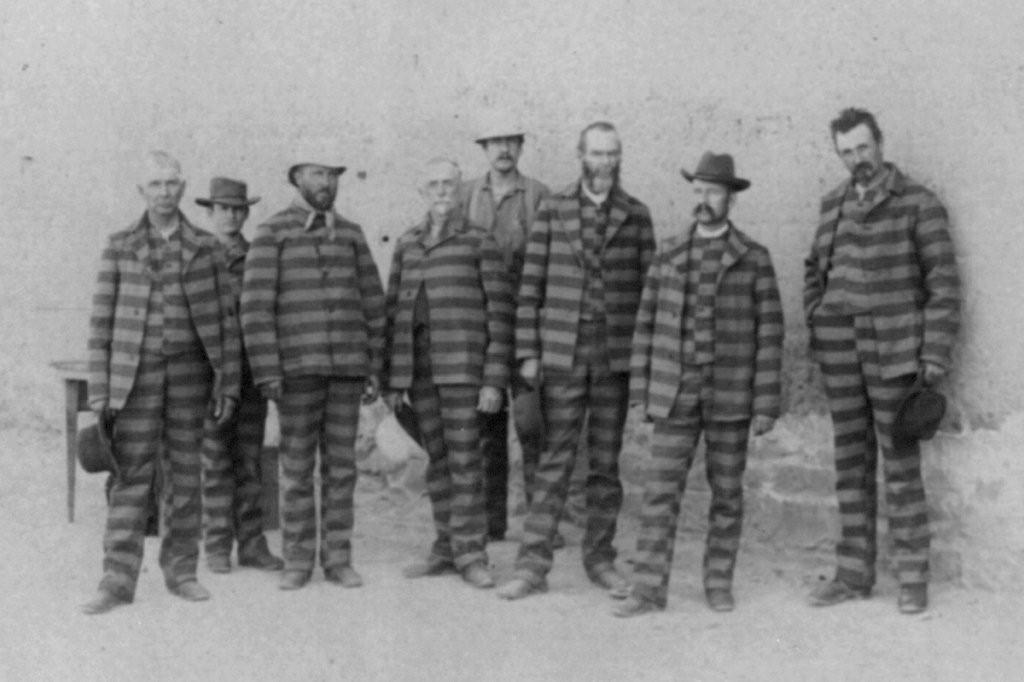
Prisoners in Utah c. 1885 wearing striped prison uniforms considered a badge of shame

After Innocent III later presided over the Fourth Council of the Lateran in 1215, the council adopted canon 68, requiring Jews (and Muslims) to dress distinctively to prevent interfaith relations.

This canon was largely ignored by the secular governments of Europe until 1269 when King Louis IX of France, later Saint Louis, was persuaded to decree that French Jews must wear round yellow badges on their breasts and backs.

After the Albigensian Crusade ended in 1229, the subsequent Papal inquisition of Pope Gregory IX imposed the ecclesiastical penance of the Cathar yellow cross as a badge of shame to be worn by the remaining repentant Cathars convicted of heresy.

In colonial New England during the 17th and 18th centuries, courts required people who were convicted of sexual immorality to wear the letter "A" or the letters "AD" for adultery and the letter "I" for incest on their clothing.

Striped prison uniforms were commonly used in the 19th century as a way to mark escaping convicts. Modern orange prison uniforms serve the same purpose, but with a visible bright color in order to make it difficult for escaping convicts to hide themselves. The use of stripes was adopted because simple one-color uniforms could easily be dyed with another color. Dyeing a striped uniform cannot hide the stripes. They were temporarily abolished in the United States early in the 20th century because their use as a badge of shame was considered undesirable because they were causing constant feelings of embarrassment and exasperation to the prisoners.

They came back into use because the public's viewpoint changed. In many of today's jails and prisons in the United States, inmates are forced to wear striped prison uniforms. Black and white stripes are used in the Maricopa County Jail which was under the administration of Joe Arpaio.

Another color scheme is orange and white stripes. A person who wears this kind of clothing is distinctly marked and can unmistakably be identified as a prison inmate from a far distance, which allows citizens to instantly identify escapees and notify the authorities. Some facilities use hot pink uniforms for the same reasons: better visibility as well as deterrence, as male inmates generally find pink clothes emasculating.

=== Skin ===
Societies have marked people directly in the practice generally known as being "branded a criminal". Criminals and slaves have been marked with tattoos. Sexual immorality in colonial New England was also punished by human branding with a hot iron, by having the marks burned into the skin of the face or forehead for all to see.

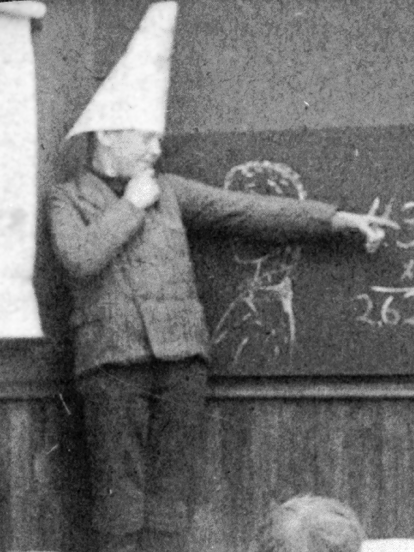
A child wearing a dunce cap in class, from a staged photo c.1906

The practice of human branding with visible marks on the face had been firmly established by King Edward VI of England under the 1547 Statute of Vagabonds, which specified the burning of the letter "S" on the cheek or forehead of an escaped slave, and the letter "F" for "fraymaker" on the cheek of a church brawler.

James Nayler, an English Quaker convicted of blasphemy in 1656, was famously branded with a "B" on his forehead. The practice of human branding was abolished in England by 1829. It continued in the United States until at least 1864, during the American Civil War, when the faces of some deserters from the Union Army were branded with the letter "D" as a mark of shame that was intended to discourage others from deserting. Runaway slaves could be branded with an "R" for "runaway", which ensured he or she was watched closely and often prejudiced against by any subsequent owners and overseers.

=== Headwear ===
In old-fashioned French schoolrooms, misbehaving students were sent to sit in a corner of the room wearing a sign that said "Âne", meaning donkey, and were forced to wear a jester's cap with donkey's ears, sometimes conical in shape, known as a "bonnet d'âne", meaning "donkey's cap". In traditional British and American schoolrooms, the tall conical "dunce cap", often marked with the letter "D", was used as the badge of shame for disfavored students. The dunce cap is no longer used in modern education. During the Chinese Cultural Revolution, individuals accused of being counter-revolutionaries were publicly humiliated by being forced to wear dunce caps with their crimes written on them.

=== Restraints ===
Presenting a prisoner to the public in restraints (such as handcuffs, shackles, chains or similar devices) has always served as a method of shaming the person as well. In addition to their practical use of preventing movement and escape, they are usually uncomfortable to wear and often lock the body in unnatural positions. Especially restraining the hands of a captive behind his or her back is perceived as particularly shameful, as it renders the person practically defenceless and showcases his or her physical defeat to onlookers. The effect is often multiplied by combining means of marking people such as the use of prison uniforms or similar clothing like penitential garbs and the exposure of bare feet. Such a prisoner may also be perp walked through a public place.

== Other meanings ==
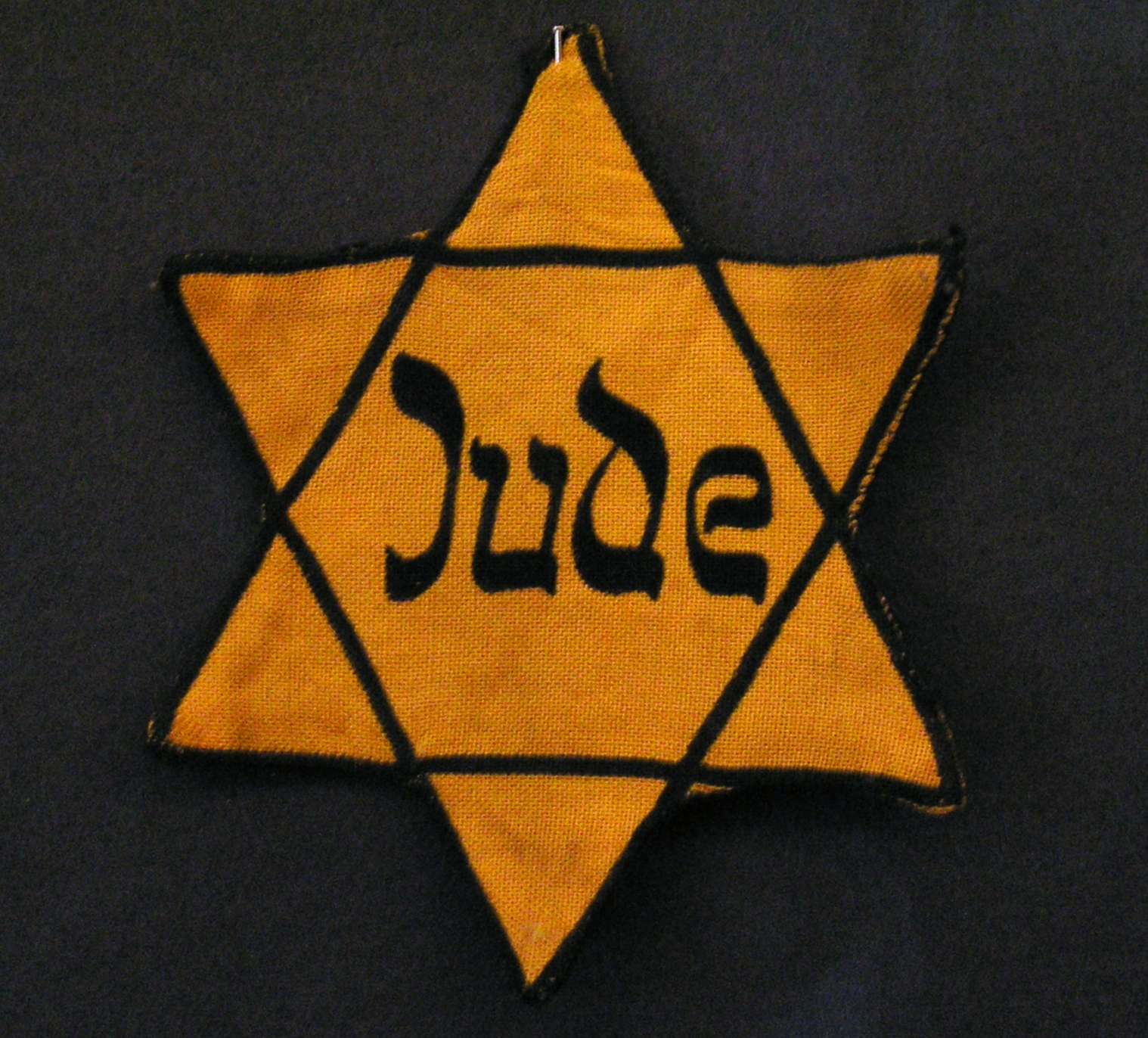
The yellow badge that Jews were forced to wear in Nazi Germany as a badge of shame

Nazi concentration camp badges of shame were triangular and color-coded to classify prisoners by reason for detention, and Jews wore two triangles in the shape of the six-pointed Star of David. These symbols, intended by the Nazis to be marks of shame, had opposite meanings after World War II: the triangle symbols were used on memorials to those killed in the concentration camps, the pink triangle that homosexual prisoners were required to wear became a symbol of gay pride, and the Zionists' Star of David, also co-opted for the Nazi version of the yellow badge, was subsequently featured prominently on the flag of Israel.

Conversely, symbols intended to have positive connotations can have unintended consequences. After World War I, the U.S. War Department awarded gold chevrons to soldiers serving in the combat zones in Europe. The silver chevrons awarded for honorable domestic service in support of the war effort were instead considered a badge of shame by many recipients.

In April 1945 the government of Czechoslovakia ordered the expropriation, denaturalisation and ensuing deportation of all Germans and Hungarians. In May 1945 Germans had to wear white or yellow armbands with a capital N, for Němec (German), printed on. The armbands were to be worn on the outside clothes until finally, the government had deported all Germans, by 1947.

More recently, in 2007, the Bangkok, Thailand police switched to punitive pink armbands adorned with the cute Hello Kitty cartoon character when the tartan armbands that had been intended to be worn as a badge of shame for minor infractions were instead treated as collectibles by offending officers forced to wear them, creating a perverse incentive. The revised scheme, however, was also soon abandoned.

== Fictional works ==
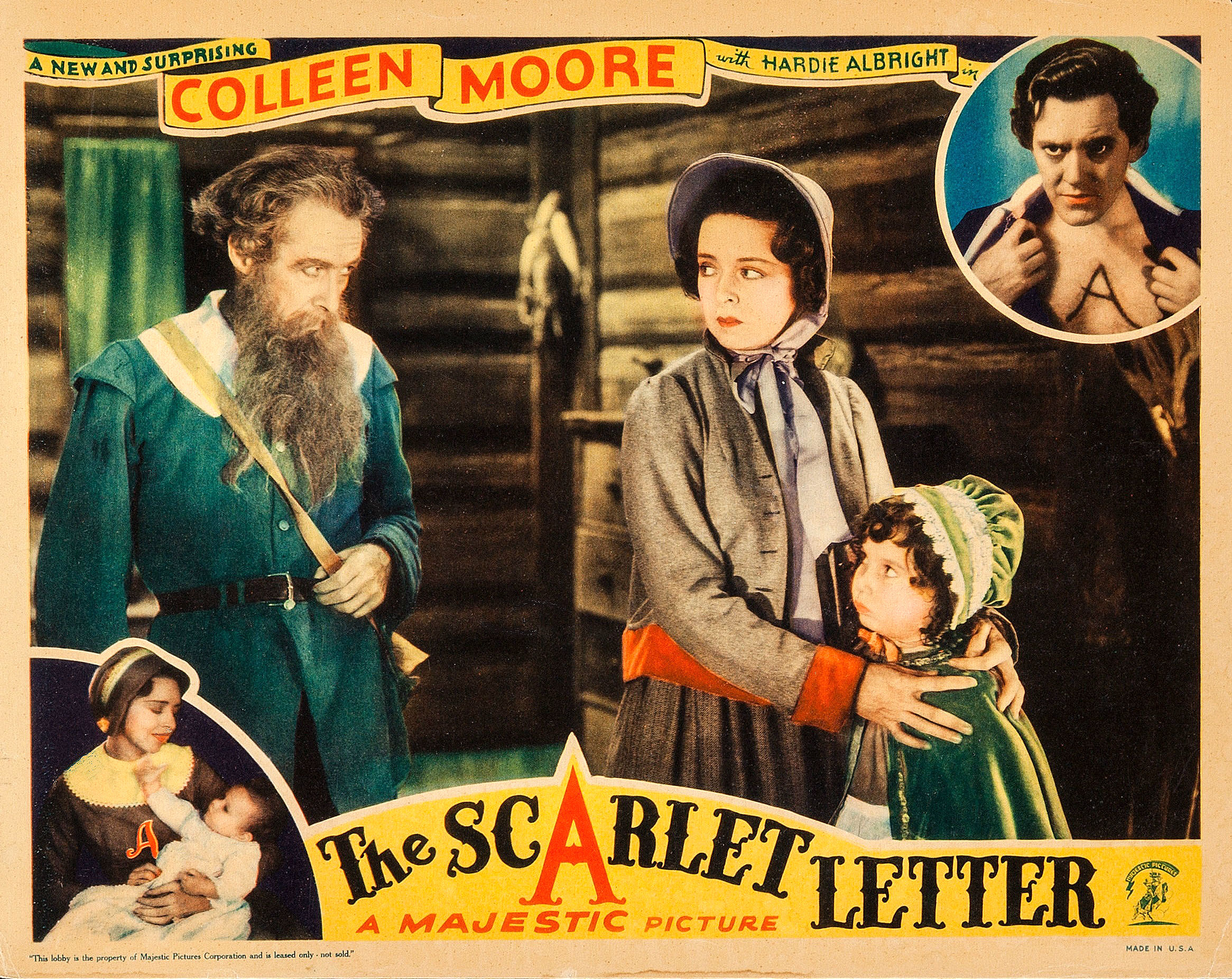
This lobby card for the 1934 adaptation of The Scarlet Letter prominently features the letter "A".

In Nathaniel Hawthorne's classic 1850 romance novel The Scarlet Letter, set in the 1640s in Puritan Boston, the lead character Hester Prynne is led from the town prison with the scarlet letter "A" on her breast. The scarlet letter "A" represents the act of adultery that she had committed and it is to be a symbol of her sin for all to see. Originally intended as a badge of shame, it would later take on different meanings as her life progressed.

The 1916 silent film The Yellow Passport, starring Clara Kimball Young, was also known as The Badge of Shame when it was reissued in 1917.

In the comic strip The Phantom and in its prose, comic book, and film adaptations, the titular hero wears a ring that leaves a permanent skull image on people punched with it. This mark indicates that the bearer is a villain and to be avoided.

In the 2006 film Pirates of the Caribbean: Dead Man's Chest, Lord Cutler Beckett (Tom Hollander) is seen using as a fireplace poker, a branding iron with the letter "P" that he used to impart the "pirate's brand" seen on the right forearm of Captain Jack Sparrow (Johnny Depp). According to the backstory, Sparrow was branded a pirate by Beckett for refusing to transport slaves for the East India Trading Company.

In the animated Nickelodeon series Avatar: The Last Airbender Zuko's father burned his face for talking out of turn in a war meeting.

In the film Inglourious Basterds the protagonists carve swastikas into the foreheads of surviving German soldiers, to make their malfeasance known to all in the future.

In the 2012 game Dishonored, an item called the Heretics Brand can be used to eliminate a target without killing. The brand is used to humiliate and to force the victim to become an outcast.

The Japanese manga and anime series Attack on Titan shows the Eldians living in Marley were forced to wear armbands to identify themselves in internment zones.

== See also ==
- Public humiliation
- Physical restraint
- Prison uniform
- Social stigma
