= Prison uniform =

Outfit worn by incarcerated people

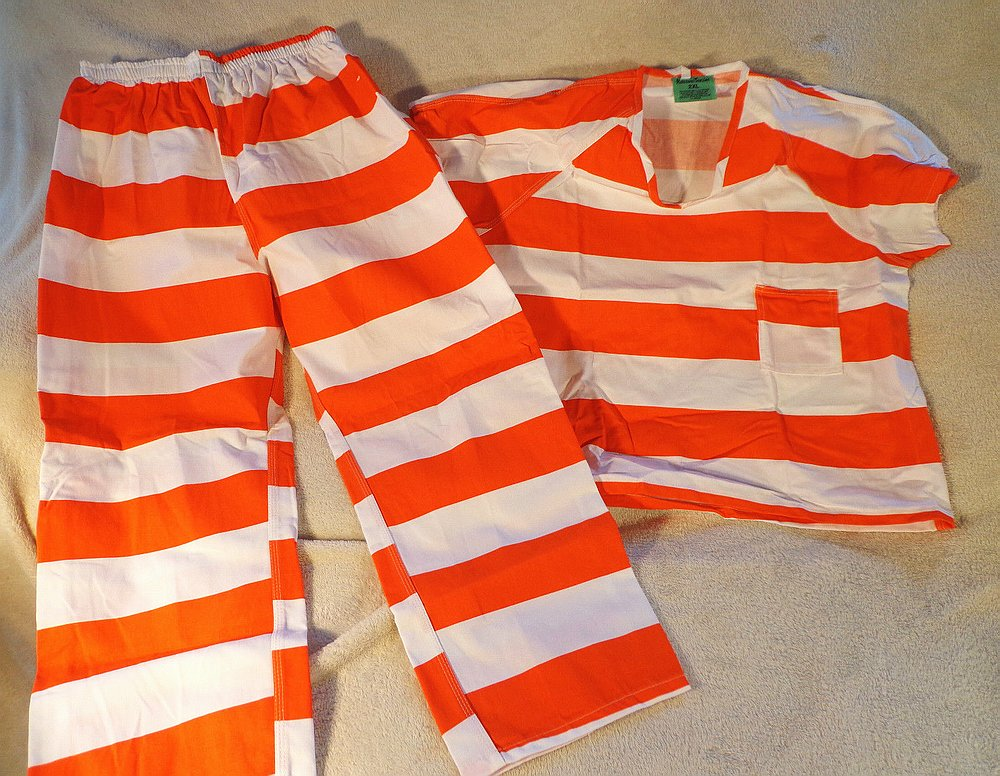
Striped prison uniform, contemporary design as used in the United States and other countries

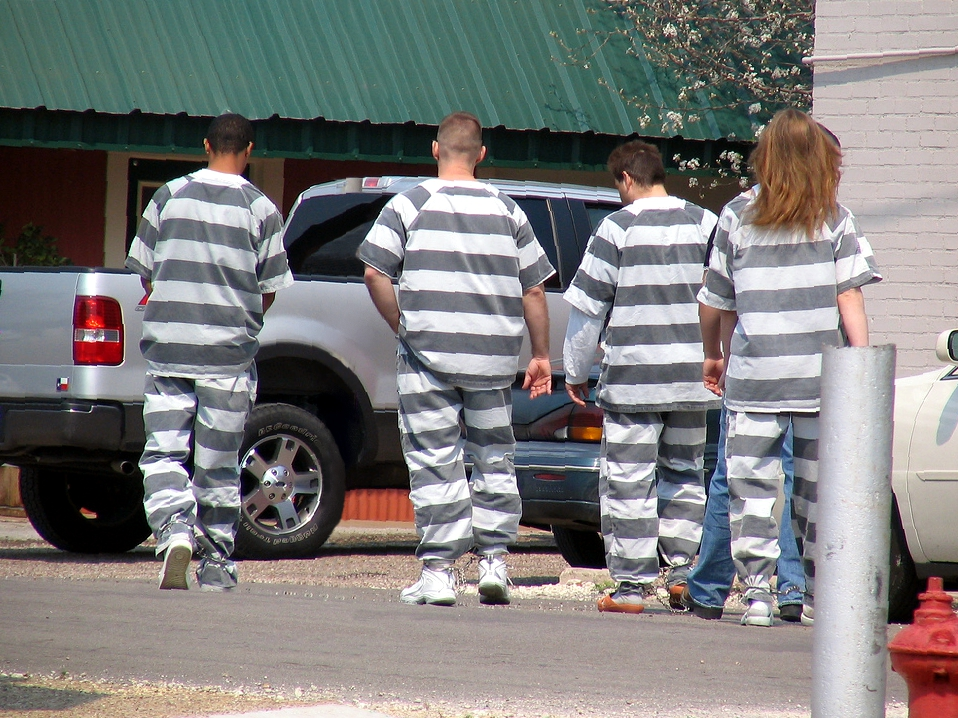
Inmates outfitted in common present-day prison uniforms (gray-white), US

A prison uniform or a jail uniform is a set of standardized clothing worn by prisoners. It usually includes visually distinct clothes worn to indicate the wearer is a prisoner, in clear distinction from civil clothing.

Prison uniforms are intended to make prisoners instantly identifiable, limit risks through concealed objects and prevent injuries through undesignated clothing objects. A prison uniform can also spoil attempts of escape, as prison uniforms typically use a design and color scheme that is easily noticed and identified even at a greater distance. Wearing a prison uniform is typically done only reluctantly and is often perceived as stigmatizing, and as an invasion into the autonomy of decision.

The United Nations Standard Minimum Rules for the Treatment of Prisoners (The Mandela Rules) first adopted in 1955 and amended in 2015, prohibit degrading or humiliating clothing, requiring in Rule 19 that:

1. Every prisoner who is not allowed to wear his or her own clothing shall be provided with an outfit of clothing suitable for the climate and adequate to keep him or her in good health. Such clothing shall in no manner be degrading or humiliating.
2. All clothing shall be clean and kept in proper condition. Underclothing shall be changed and washed as often as necessary for the maintenance of hygiene.
3. In exceptional circumstances, whenever a prisoner is removed outside the prison for an authorized purpose, they shall be allowed to wear their own clothing or other inconspicuous clothing.

== Early prison uniforms ==
During the Victorian era when prison sentences of prolonged durance were implemented in the judicial system of several countries, actual garments were conceived to be worn specifically by prison inmates, which developed to the various types of prison uniforms presently in use.

== Prison uniform by nation ==
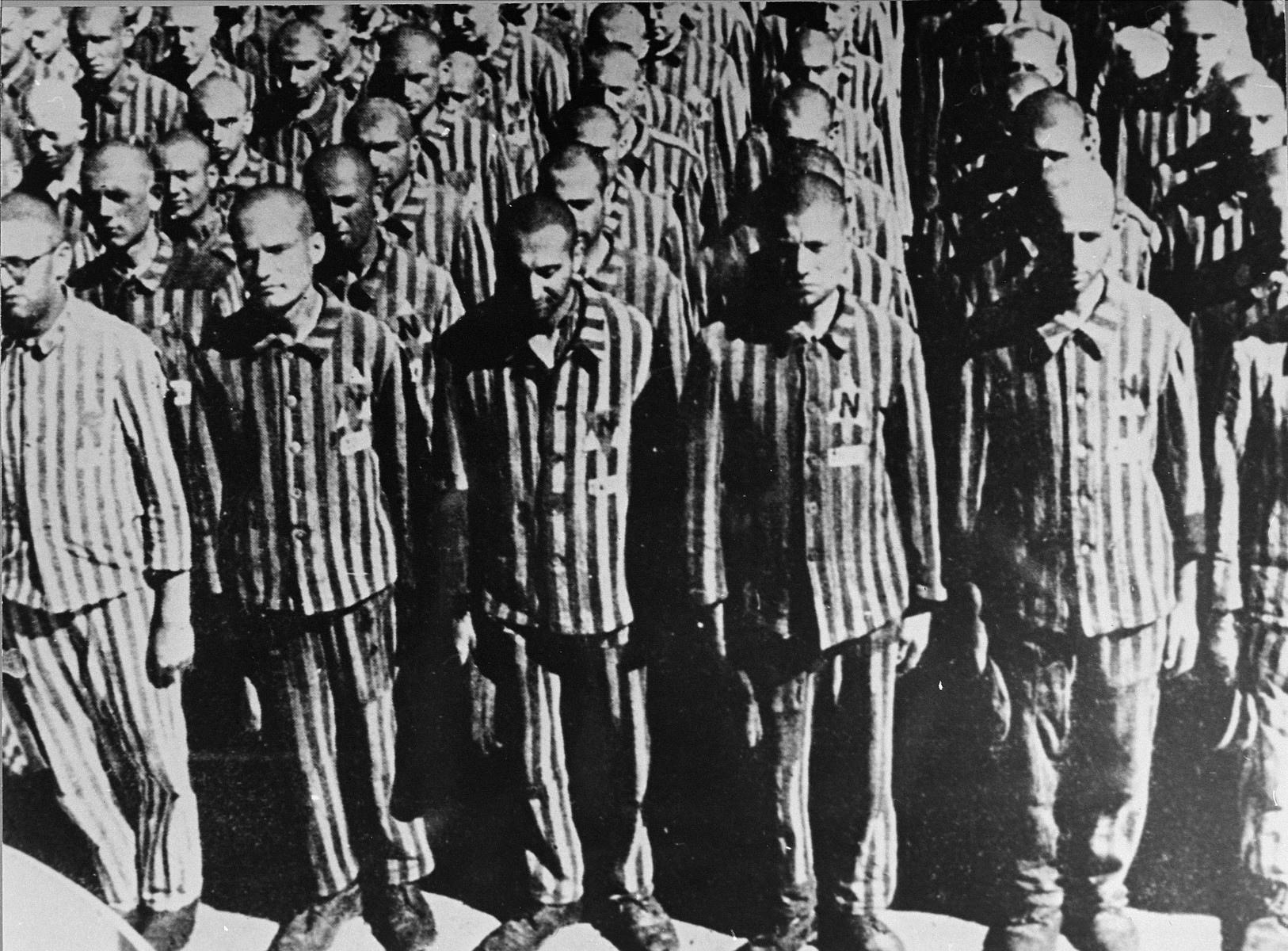
Dutch Jews wearing vertically striped uniforms at the Mauthausen concentration camp during World War II.

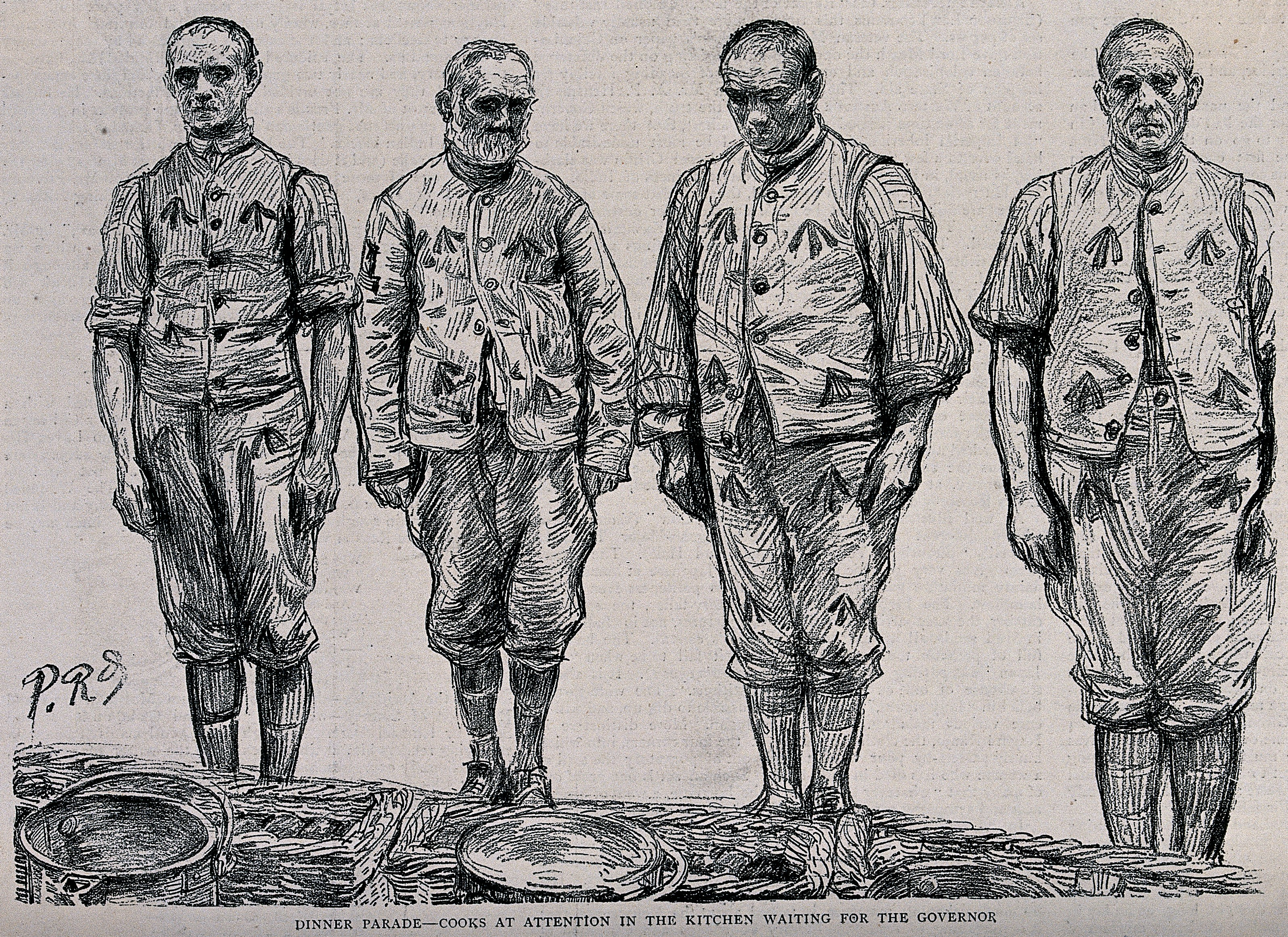
British prison uniform, 19th century

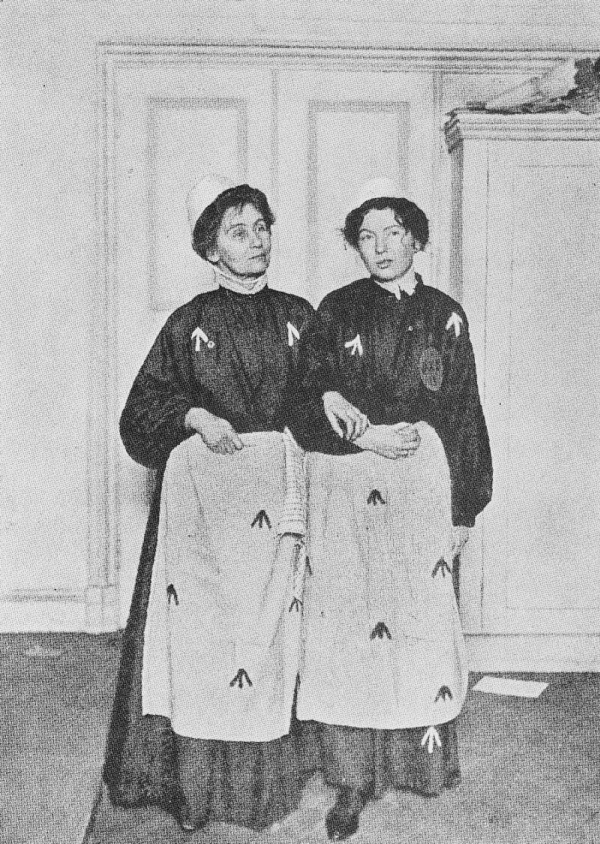
Emmeline and Christabel Pankhurst wearing British prison uniforms stamped with the broad arrow

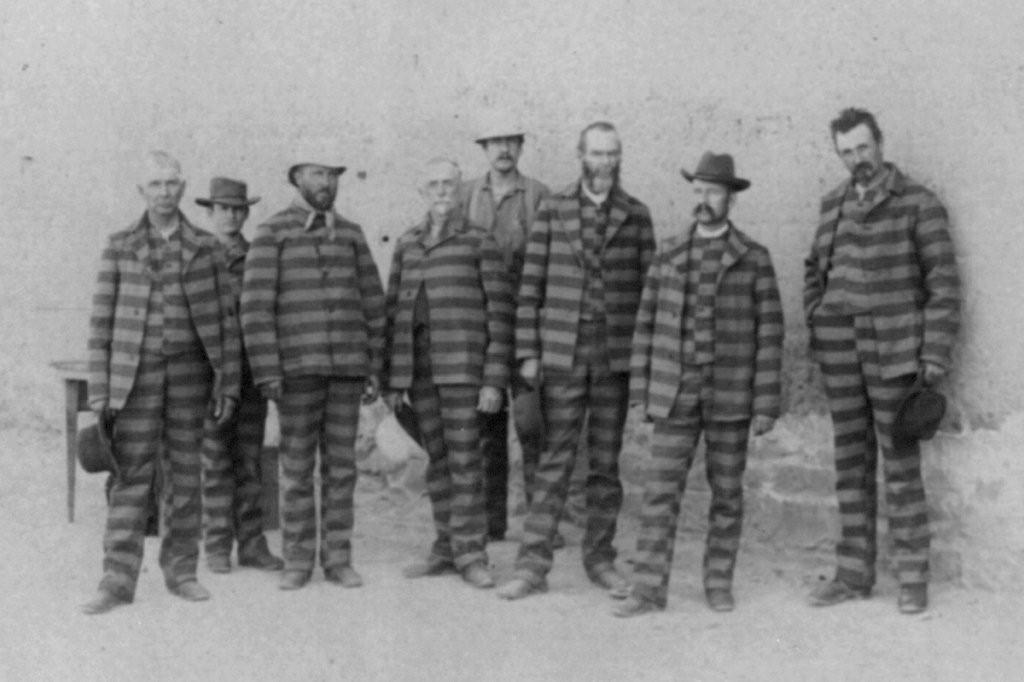
Prisoners in Utah c. 1885 wearing the horizontally-striped prison uniforms devised at Auburn Prison.

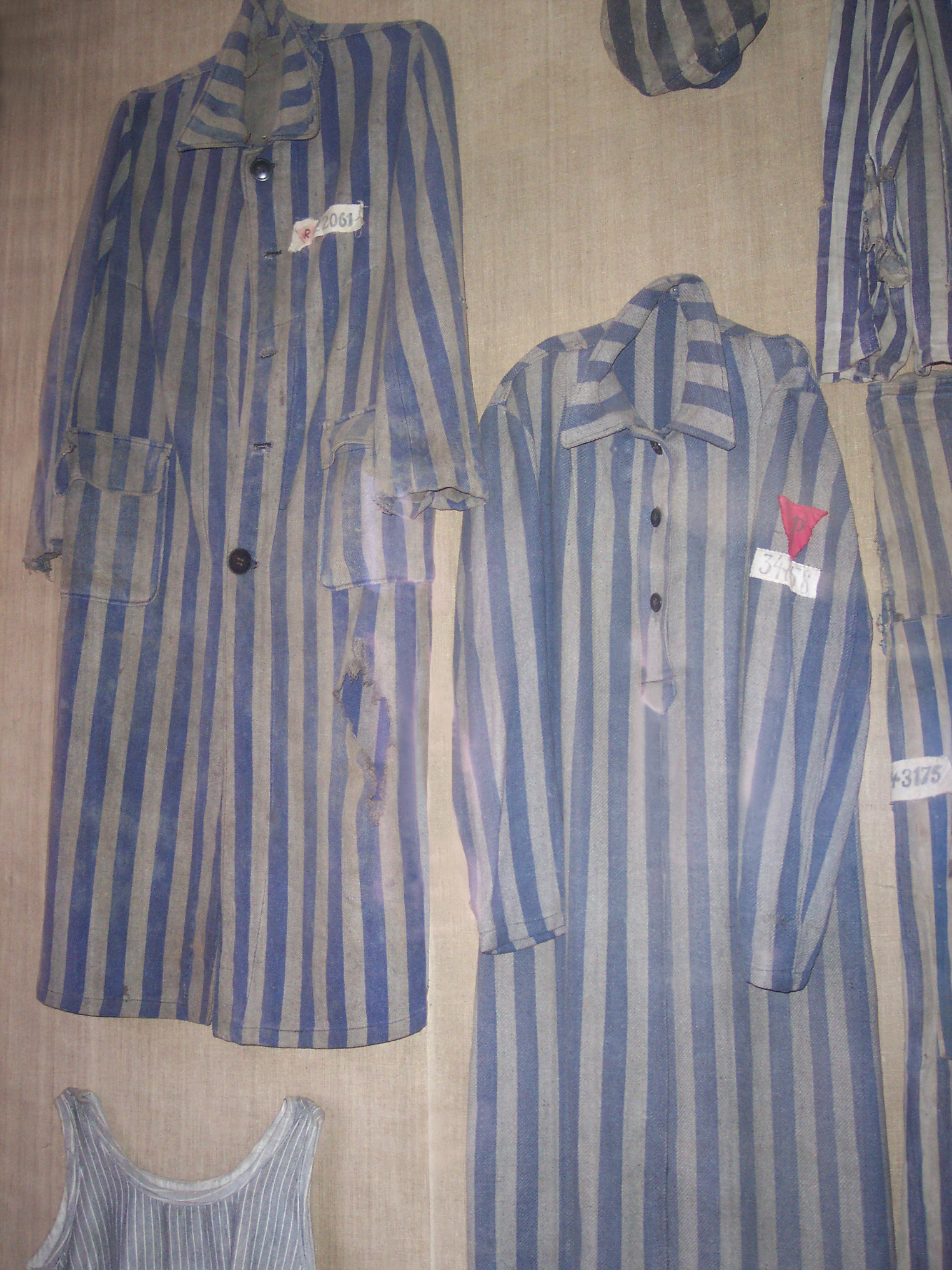
Blue-grey striped uniforms for female prisoners at the Auschwitz concentration camp

=== Romania ===
All incarcerated people in Romania wear their own clothes. Until around 2007, when Romania joined the EU, prison uniforms existed, but there is few sources on whether they were compulsory for all people behind bars, compulsory for all convicts, used by some detainees, used by some convicts, or used by both some detainees and convicts. It is however known that a short time after the collapse of communism (in 1992) uniforms were compulsory for all people behind bars. It is known that the Aiud prison required inmates to wear khaki uniforms and inmates serving a life sentence wore orange uniforms. As for other prisons, many probably also used khaki uniforms as human rights website shows inmates in khaki uniforms at Rahova prison.

=== Poland ===
While prison uniforms are used for both convicts and detainees, they are not compulsory. The policies are similar to those in Germany. Some prisons do not use them at all, some prisons use them only for some inmates (depending on conviction of crime or behavior), and some prisons make uniforms compulsory. Minimum security prisons are encouraged to not use prison uniforms and maximum security prisons are encouraged to use them, however this all varies as some inmates incarcerated for small crimes do wear uniforms and some inmates incarcerated for serious crimes do not wear them. Uniforms are almost always worn on top of civilian clothes. Usually on all security levels the uniform is a green button-down jacket worn on top of civilian clothes with green jacket pants but some inmates in maximum security prisons and non-serious criminals who are badly misbehaved sometimes wear orange or red instead of green.

=== Germany ===
During the Nazi period of Germany, interned people in the concentration camp system were often made to wear prisoner's uniforms. In today's Germany, inmates may wear regular civilian clothing in some prisons. In other prisons clothing issued by the prison is compulsory. If a prisoner cannot afford to have their own clothing cleaned and/or replaced, they may be issued with clothing. There are also facilities with no prison uniforms.

The prison uniforms are officially referred to as Anstaltskleidung (literally: "institutional clothing"), not as "uniforms". They are usually similar to the type of clothing generally worn for manual work, and not necessarily recognizable as prison clothing. When prisoners are allowed to temporarily leave prison, they may generally wear private clothing to avoid being recognized as prisoners.

=== United Kingdom ===
==== 19th century ====
In the United Kingdom, prison uniforms formerly consisted of a white jacket, trousers and pillbox hat, all stamped with the broad arrow to denote crown property. The idea of covering the uniforms of Penal Servitude prisoners with the broad arrow was first introduced by Sir Edmund Du Cane in the 1870s after his appointment as Chairman of Convict Directors and Surveyor-General of Prisons. Du Cane considered the broad arrow to be a hindrance to escape and also a mark of shame. It was certainly unpopular with the convicts. "All over the whole clothing were hideous black impressions of the Broad Arrow", wrote one prisoner. Another considered the "hideous dress" to be "the most extraordinary garb I had ever seen outside a pantomime". The British Prison Act of 1877 led to mass production and "standardization" of prison uniforms in the UK; these uniforms would consist of a rough cloth fabric that consisted of shades of blue, grey, and brown. Men sent to public-works prisons were issued with boots. One prisoner, Jeremiah O'Donovan Rossa, left this description: "Fully fourteen pounds in weight. I put them on and the weight of them served to fasten me to the ground. It was not that alone, but the sight of the impression they left on the gutter as you looked at the footprints of those who walked before you, struck terror to your heart. There was the felon's brand of the ‘broad arrow' impressed on the soil by every footstep…the nails in the soles of your boots and shoes were hammered in an arrow shape, so that whatever ground you trod you left traces that Government property had travelled over it."

==== 20th century ====
The broad arrow-marked uniforms of the preceding century were used until 1922, with the replacement taking the form of a plain suit (jacket, waistcoat, and trousers) worn with a collared shirt and a tie; footwear consisted of woolen socks and black leather shoes. During the Second World War, German and Italian prisoners of war who were engaged in agricultural work were issued with a chocolate brown version of battledress which featured a white circular patch on the chest and back; consideration was given to introducing battledress or similar for the domestic prison population after the war, but it was instead decided to continue with the suit uniform, albeit with the appearance being improved, protective clothing (bib-and-brace overalls) being provided for work purposes, and reissued uniforms now being dry-cleaned instead of being boiled. As of 1952, the standard uniform was produced in grey, remand prisoners and those civil prisoners who chose to wear a uniform wore a brown version, and long-term prisoners wore a navy blue jacket towards the end of their sentence; the shirt was cream-colored and pinstriped, and worn with a blue or brown tie. Between the 1960s and 1980s, the suit uniform was replaced by a version of battledress, with criminal prisoners wearing a blue uniform and civil prisoners wearing a brown uniform not unlike that previously issued to prisoners of war; the blouse began to be replaced by a conventional jacket during the 1970s. Female prisoners initially wore jean dresses with aprons and white caps, with grey cardigans being added during colder weather; after the Second World War, the dress was replaced by a zephyr frock (available in four colours to the prisoner's own taste), with one being issued for work, another being issued for wear in the evenings, and an additional maternity version being issued as needed. The earlier uniform's cardigan was retained. Underwear, stockings, and footwear were revised in line with contemporary styling, while those who wished to wear their own corsets and brassieres could do so if these items were in a fit state. By the 1970s, women were generally permitted to choose their own clothes.

==== 21st century ====
Currently prisoners are clothed in a standard-issue prison uniform, which consists of a blue t-shirt, a grey jumper (sweater), and grey soft trousers (jogging bottoms/pants). All male prisoners must wear the uniform during the first two weeks of their sentence, and are then entitled to wear some of their own clothes if they choose to after obtaining a higher enhanced reward level, for doing things such as performing their prison chores and keeping good behavior, etc. This does not include dangerous criminals, usually those held in Category A maximum security prisons, who are assessed as having a high escape attempt risk; they are required to wear yellow and green boiler suits with the words 'HM PRISON' ('HM' standing for His/Her Majesty) printed on the back in black capital lettering on a permanent basis whilst in custody. This uniform is known as an "Escape list suit". Such prisoners are also handcuffed and sometimes fitted with a leather belly chain when moved outside of prison to places such as court buildings. Remanded prisoners in the UK who have not yet been sentenced may wear their own clothing. Prisoners in Category D open prisons can also wear their own clothing to prepare them for their eventual release, but not anything that resembles a prison officer's uniform. All non-prison-issue personal clothing sent in must be approved before it can be used by prisoners.

Although female prisoners are not subject to the same rules and do not have to wear uniform under government legislation, individual female prisons are able to set their own regulations regarding uniforms. Many female prisons still stock prison issue clothing items similar to those worn by male prisoners for women who don't have clothing of their own, and have regulations regarding what items of clothing can and cannot be worn are similar to those upheld by male prisons.

=== United States ===
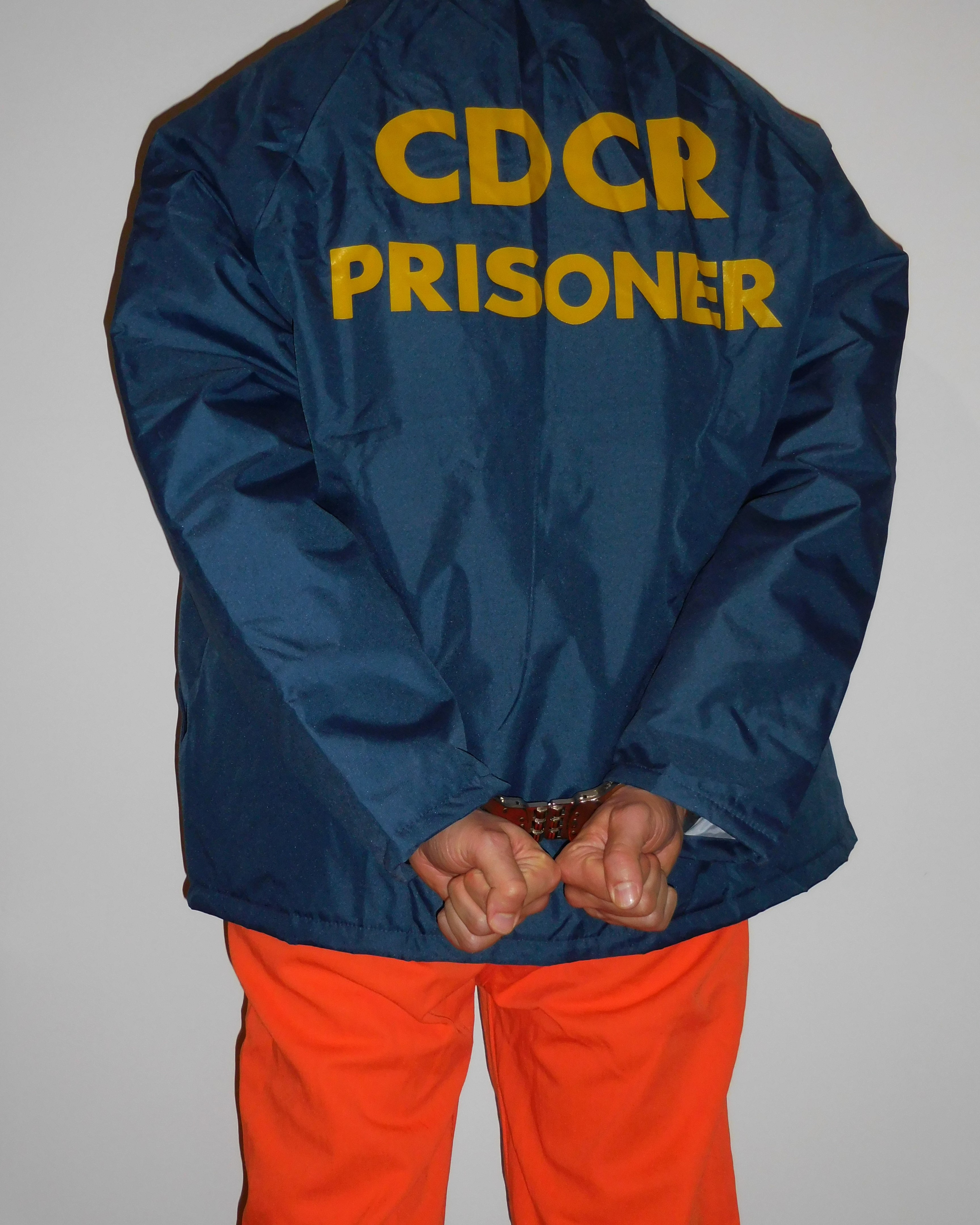
Man wearing California Department of Corrections uniform.

There is currently no standardized prison outfit across jurisdictions in the United States.

In the eighteenth century, prison outfits began with no distinction. However, this quickly changed starting in the 1790s and 1800s to uniforms based on differentiation.

==== Work clothes ====
Work clothes were introduced, perhaps because of the concept of honest labor helping to turn an inmate into an honest citizen. Blue jeans and light blue denim or chambray work shirts became the norm, a tradition still followed in some state prison systems today, such as in California State Prison. At least until the 1940s, the chore jacket was being worn as Los Angeles County Jail clothing. In federal prisons, this concept was introduced in the form of khaki pants and shirts, still in use. Work clothes can range from blue or green shirts to denim pants. The use of work clothes in jails has sometimes been retracted due to inmate escapes going unnoticed.

==== Orange ====
From the 1970s onward, orange jumpsuits became commonplace in some areas, later updated to orange scrubs. Orange and red outfits are used in California for inmates awaiting trial or transportation to a more permanent facility. In contrast, New York bans the use of orange prison uniforms. The orange jumpsuit became an international symbol of abuse and propagandized by groups such as ISIS, which altered its perception. Orange prison jumpsuits also became part of civilian fashion trends, which has motivated some prisons to use different uniforms for inmates.

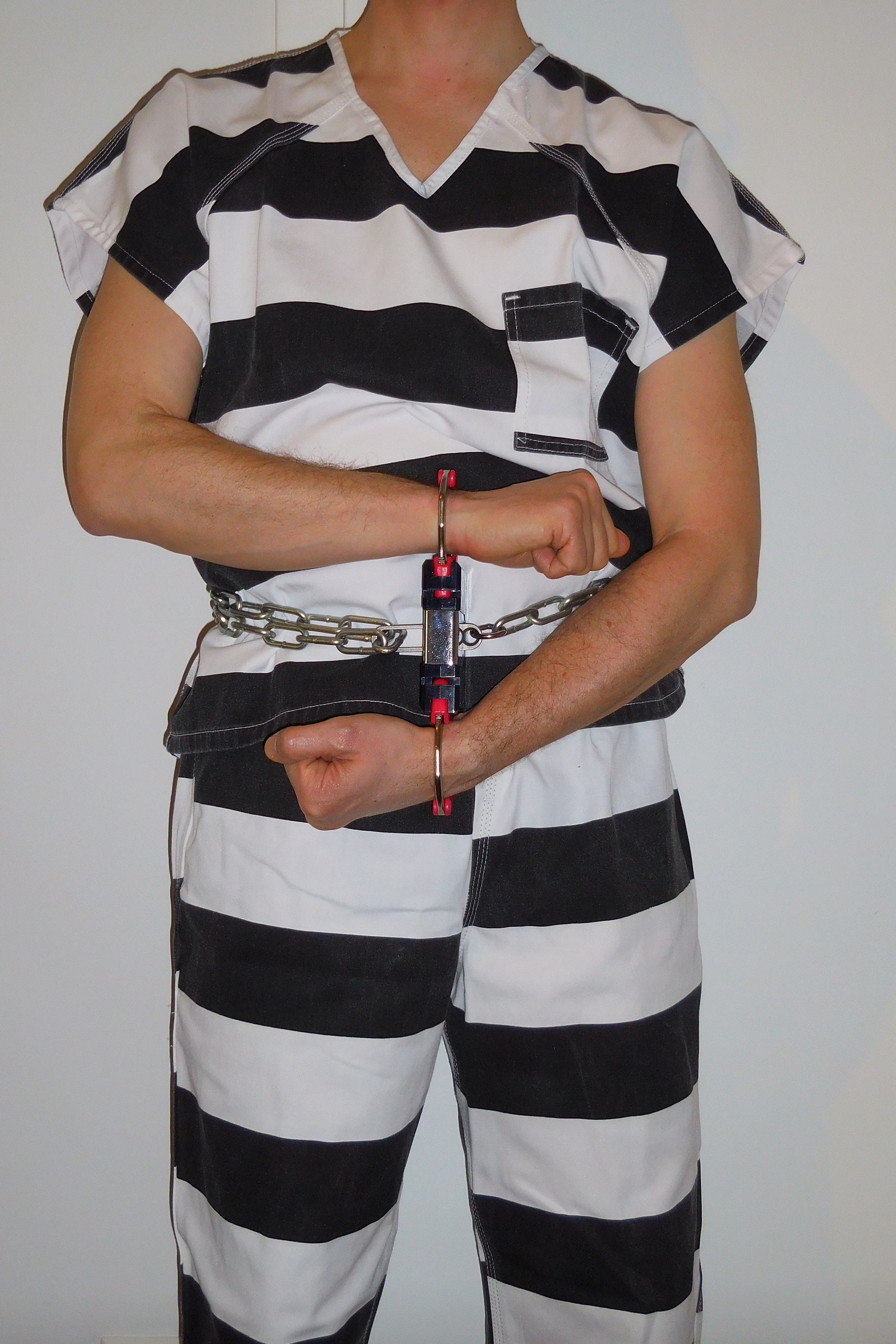
Striped inmate uniform.

==== Stripes ====
Striped prison uniforms began being used in the U.S. in as early as 1815. These uniforms that were commonly used in the 19th century (the Auburn system) were abolished in some parts of the United States early in the 20th century because their continued use as a badge of shame was considered undesirable. Striped uniforms lost popularity in the 1940s and 1950s. However, some prisons continued to use striped uniforms, despite criticism.

Striped uniforms made a comeback into some jails and prisons for a variety of reasons, such as mistaking jumpsuit-clad workers as inmates, orange being viewed as fashionable outside of jail, or inmate escapes going unnoticed. False reporting of people in orange clothing as inmates also became a concern, so striped uniforms (mostly orange and white or black and white) were reintroduced in some counties. Other striped uniforms, such as green and white stripes, are used in some facilities as well.

==== Pink ====
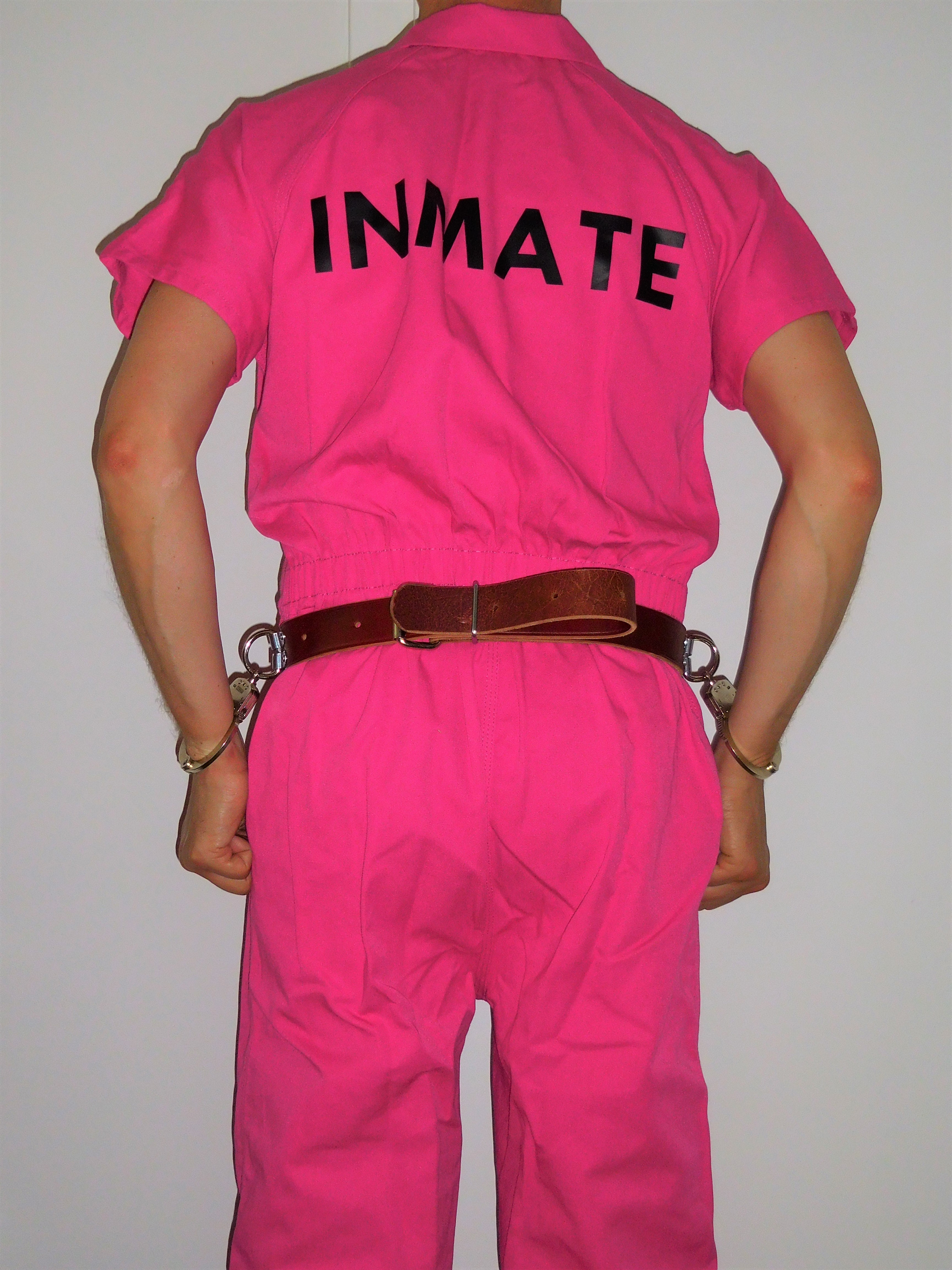
Inmate in pink uniform

In the 21st century, hot pink uniforms were introduced in some facilities. This color of clothing makes inmates very visible, and wearing hot pink clothes is meant to be disincentivizing, especially for male inmates. In 2012, a federal court ruled that pink jail uniforms, which had been in use since the mid-1990s in Maricopa County, Arizona, were "meant to symbolize the loss of prisoners' masculinity."

==== Other ====
Some jurisdictions in the US use different uniforms, such as white or denim.

=== Finland ===
Prisoners are given prison uniforms upon arrival to the prison; they may wear their own clothes instead, provided that the prisoner maintains the clothes themself. Prisoners can be restricted from wearing their own clothes by the prison, based on the prison order or occupational safety. Current Finnish prison uniforms are red and grey, have been in use since 1998, and are washed in a central laundry in Hämeenlinna.

=== Other countries ===
In South Korea prison uniforms are also compulsory, often using a khaki color scheme.

== See also ==
- Prison officer
- Prisoner's rights
- Detention (imprisonment)
- Straitjacket
- Physical restraints
- Dehumanization
