= New South Wales Food Authority =

NSW Food Authority
- Logo
- Abbreviation: NSWFA

Agency overview
- Formed: 5 April 2004

Jurisdictional structure
- Operations jurisdiction: New South Wales, Australia
- Legal jurisdiction: As per operations jurisdiction

Operational structure
- Headquarters: Newington, NSW; 33.83363°S 151.055022°E
- Agency executive: Dr Lisa Szabo, Chief Executive Officer
- Units: List: * Compliance, Investigation & Enforcement; * Corporate Affairs, Stakeholder Engagement & Customer Service; * Science, Business Operations & Strategy; * Strategic Policy & Partnerships

Website
- www.foodauthority.nsw.gov.au facebook.com/nswfoodauthority twitter.com/NSWFoodAuth

The NSW Food Authority is a statutory authority of the Government of New South Wales responsible for food safety and food labelling regulation in the state, as well as consumer food safety promotion. The Food Authority is within the Biosecurity and Food Safety division of the NSW Department of Primary Industries and Regional Development.

The Food Authority was established in April 2004 with the amalgamation of SafeFood Production NSW and the food inspection activities of the Department of Health. SafeFood Production NSW was itself the product of a series of amalgamations of industry-specific organisations.

NSW was the first Australian state to consolidate such a wide range of food safety and food labelling functions into a single, central government agency.

== Remit ==
The NSW Food Authority administers state and national food legislation, including the Australia New Zealand Food Standards Code and the Food Act 2003 (NSW), as well as the NSW Food Regulation 2015, which regulates specific industry sectors through food safety schemes.

The Food Authority’s functions under the Food Act include:

- keeping under review the construction, hygiene and operation of premises, vehicles and equipment used for the handling or sale of food
- providing advice or recommendations to the Minister on food safety schemes
- regulating the handling and sale of food subject to food safety schemes to ensure it is safe and suitable for human consumption
- encouraging food businesses to minimise food safety risks
- providing advice, information, education and assistance on food safety
- carrying out research necessary to perform its functions.

== Scope of activities ==
The Food Authority is Australia's first and only wholly integrated 'through-chain' state food regulation agency.

It is responsible for regulating and monitoring food safety and labelling across the industry, from point of harvest or manufacture, through to processing, transport, storage and point-of-sale.

Its activities include:

- licensing and auditing food businesses in key sectors under NSW food safety schemes, including the dairy, egg, meat, shellfish, plant, seafood and vulnerable persons sectors
- overseeing and inspecting food manufacturers and wholesalers
- partnering with local councils to oversee the state’s 55,000+ retail food businesses
- working with other agencies to manage food-related incidents
- delivering training and education programs
- monitoring food safety schemes for higher-risk foods and businesses through a process of evidence-based science and risk analysis
- sharing information on food safety and labelling to businesses and consumers.

Before the Food Authority was established, responsibility for food regulation in NSW was divided across a number of state agencies, some with scope limited to specific food sectors such as meat, dairy or seafood, or to horizontal parts of the food chain, such as retail outlets. Various degrees of segmentation remain in other Australian state and territory jurisdictions.

== Scores on Doors program ==
Example of NSW hygiene score certificate displayed at a retail food outlet

Scores on Doors is a hygiene and food safety scoring program developed by the NSW Food Authority that displays food safety inspection results of NSW retail food premises. Restaurants, takeaways, cafes, bistros, bakeries, hotels and clubs may volunteer for the program in participating council areas.

The program rates the compliance of food businesses with NSW food safety legislation at the time of an unannounced food safety inspection by a government officer. Scores are either Good (3 stars), Very Good (4 stars) or Excellent (5 stars). Businesses can choose to display a certificate or sticker showing their score, which consumers can use to decide where to eat or buy food.

Those premises found to not meet the necessary food safety standards are not awarded any display certificate.

Scores on Doors is designed to reward well-performing businesses, drive food safety culture and ultimately reduce foodborne illness.

The NSW Scores on Doors program has run in NSW since 2010.

== Name and shame initiative ==
Introduced in 2008, the NSW Food Authority’s Register of Offences, also known as the ‘Name and Shame register’, gives consumers visibility of NSW food businesses that have failed to meet food safety standards.

The initiative was a response to growing public demand for access to food business performance information, freedom of information advocates and the media.

Businesses that receive penalty notices appear on the register for a maximum of one year. The register also lists businesses or individuals that have been found guilty by a court of a breach of food safety laws. The information on each breach is published for a maximum of two years following any appeal period.

The register is updated weekly and promoted on social media. Since its launch, the number of businesses appearing on the register has significantly decreased, with most appearing only once.

== See also ==
- Food safety
- Foodborne illness
- Food allergy
- Hazard Analysis and Critical Control Points (HACCP), risk management methodology
