= Handcuffs (disambiguation) =

Handcuffs are restraint devices.

Handcuff or Handcuffs may also refer to:

- Plastic handcuffs, a restraint made with plastic straps
- Handcuff cover, a piece of metal that can be placed around the handcuffs
- Handcuffs (film), a 1969 film by Krsto Papić
- "Handcuffs" (Togetherness), a 2015 episode from this television series
- Handcuff knot, a knot having two loops
