= Plastic handcuffs =

Form of physical restraint for the hands, using plastic straps

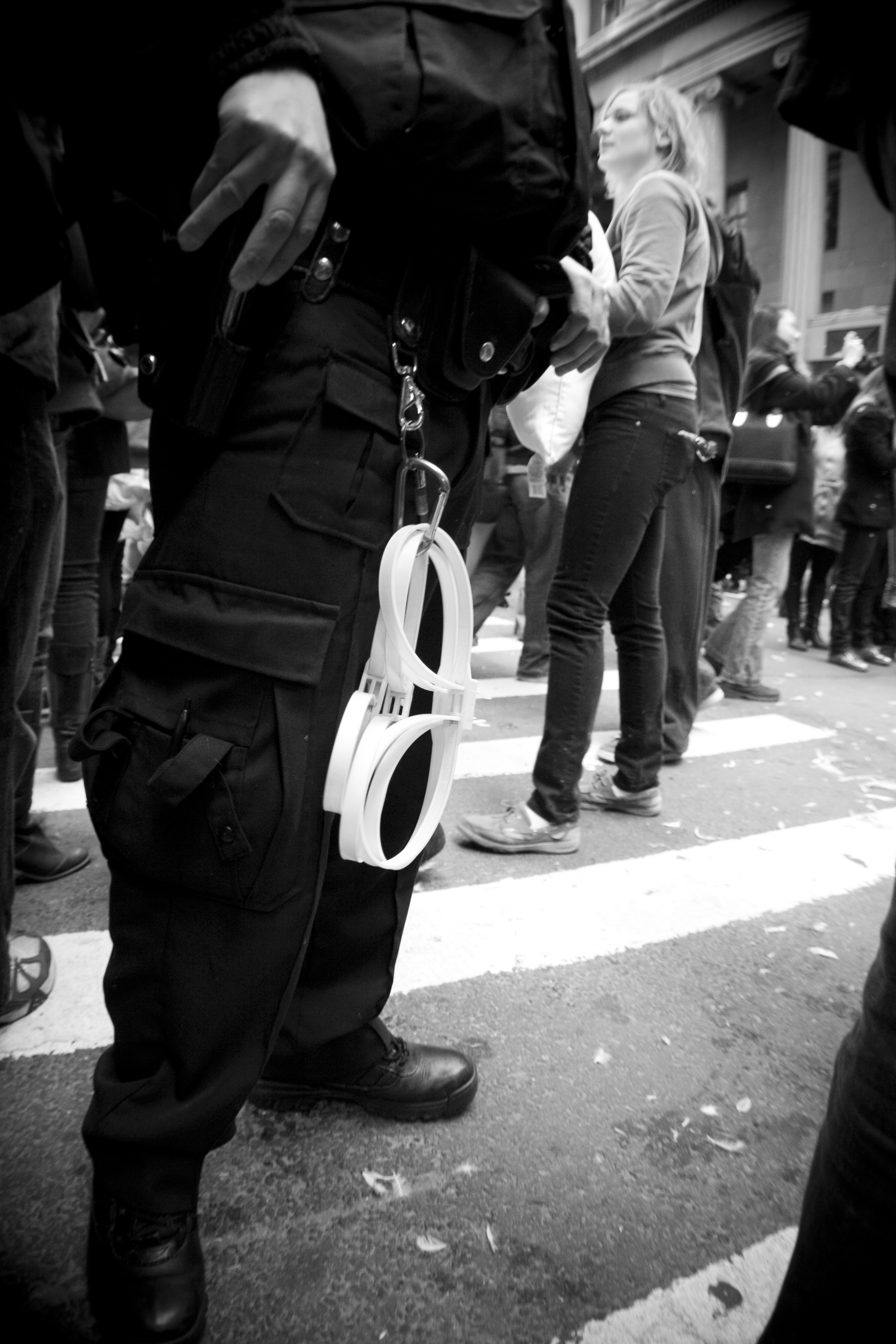
Policeman carrying plastic handcuffs

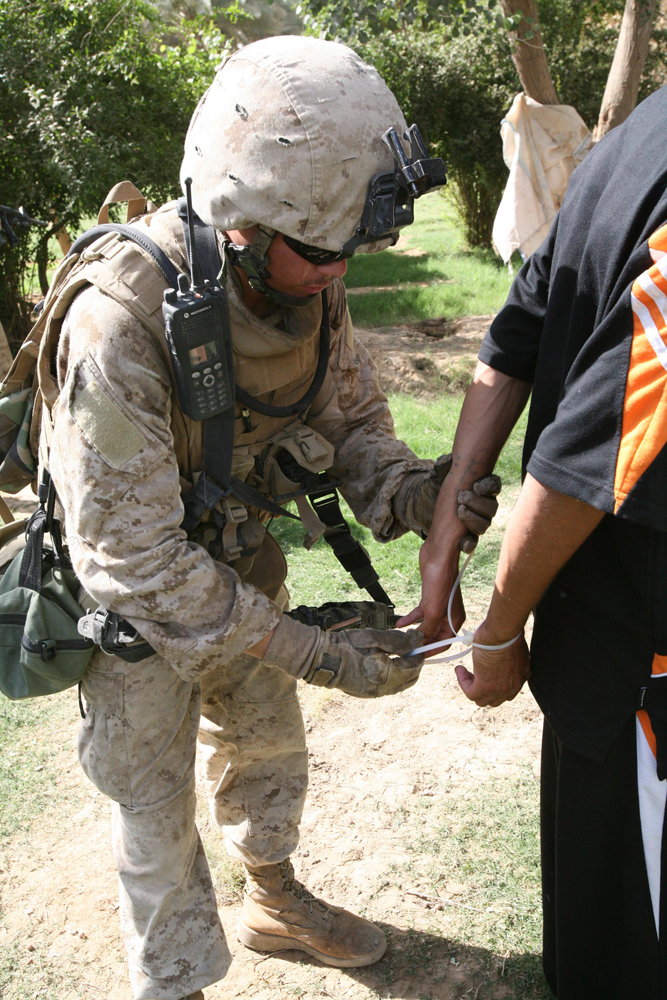
American marine flexicuffs a suspected insurgent in Iraq

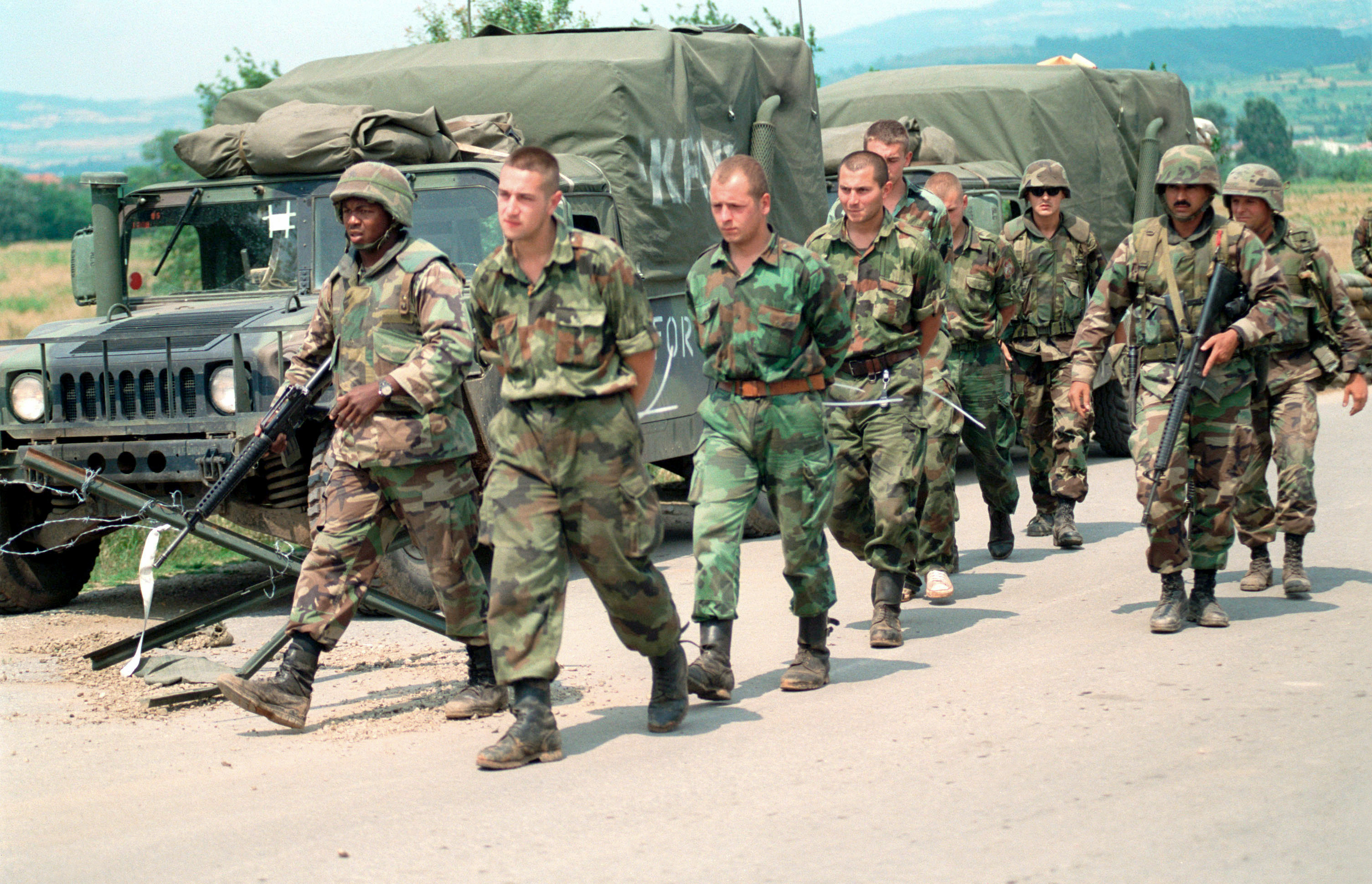
A file of flex-cuffed prisoners of war being forcibly marched

Plastic handcuffs (also called PlastiCuffs, FlexiCuffs, zip cuffs, flex cuffs or Double Cuffs) are a form of physical restraint for the hands made of plastic straps. They function as handcuffs but are cheaper and easier to carry than metal handcuffs, and they cannot be reused. The device was first introduced in 1965.

== Types ==
A traditional form of plastic handcuffs are cable ties, consisting of two interlocking straps or a single cable tie around both wrists. More recently, plastics-manufacturing companies have started to produce special devices comprising two interconnected straps as one item. These are generally injection moulded nylon items, selling for tens of cents each. Various types of plastic handcuffs have been developed, including models which can be released using a regular handcuff key, and extremely lightweight restraints made from nylon cord which use a plastic device to hold the cord tight.

== Advantages ==
The low cost and light weight of plastic handcuffs has made them popular with policemen and military forces when they anticipate a large number of arrests, as in riot control or demonstrations. An advantage of disposable restraints is avoidance of transmission of communicable disease; metal handcuffs can spread disease through reuse (from blood or other bodily fluids that may not have been cleaned off the cuffs), but disposable restraints do not need to be used on multiple subjects.

== Precautions ==
If not applied correctly, plastic handcuffs are more uncomfortable than conventional handcuffs for the person being restrained. Also, incorrect application can lead to the swelling or discoloration of the hands of the restrained. More care and training are required for the person applying them in order to avoid making them too tight. Some models cannot be double-locked, making it possible for the cuffs to be further tightened after initial application, restricting blood flow to the hands and causing injury to the subject.

Another risk of disposable restraints is that a subject of great physical strength and/or under the influence of drugs may be able to break free from them with enough effort. They are also vulnerable to being cut with wire cutters or melted with a cigarette lighter. In official uses, it is recommended to use a specialized flexicuff cutter to remove the cuffs from a detainee, rather than scissors or knives which could cause injury to the detained or detainer.

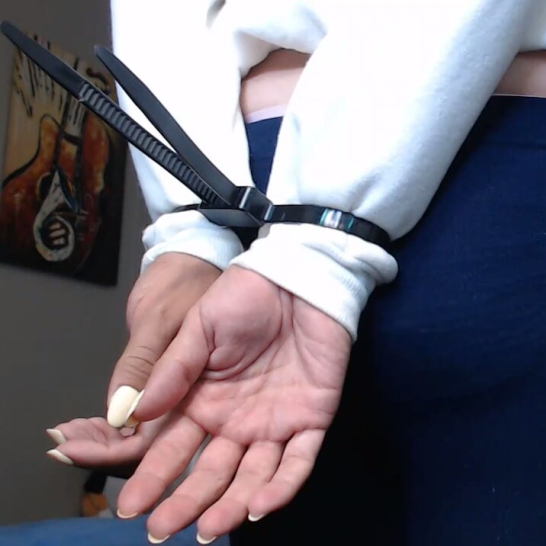
Hands zip-cuffed behind back

== See also ==
- Cable tie
