= Handcuffs =

Restraint devices

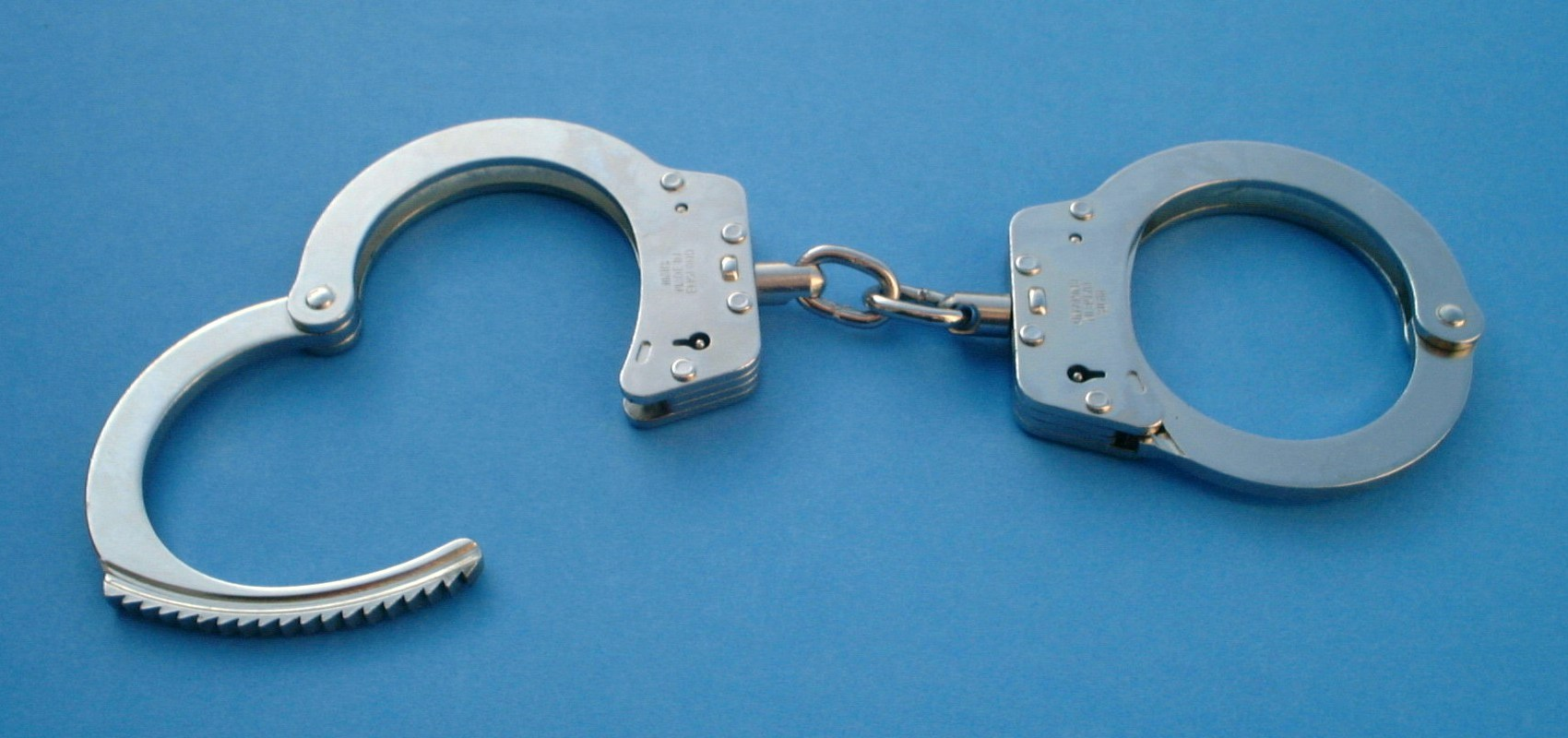
Hiatt type 2010 handcuffs. c. 1990s.

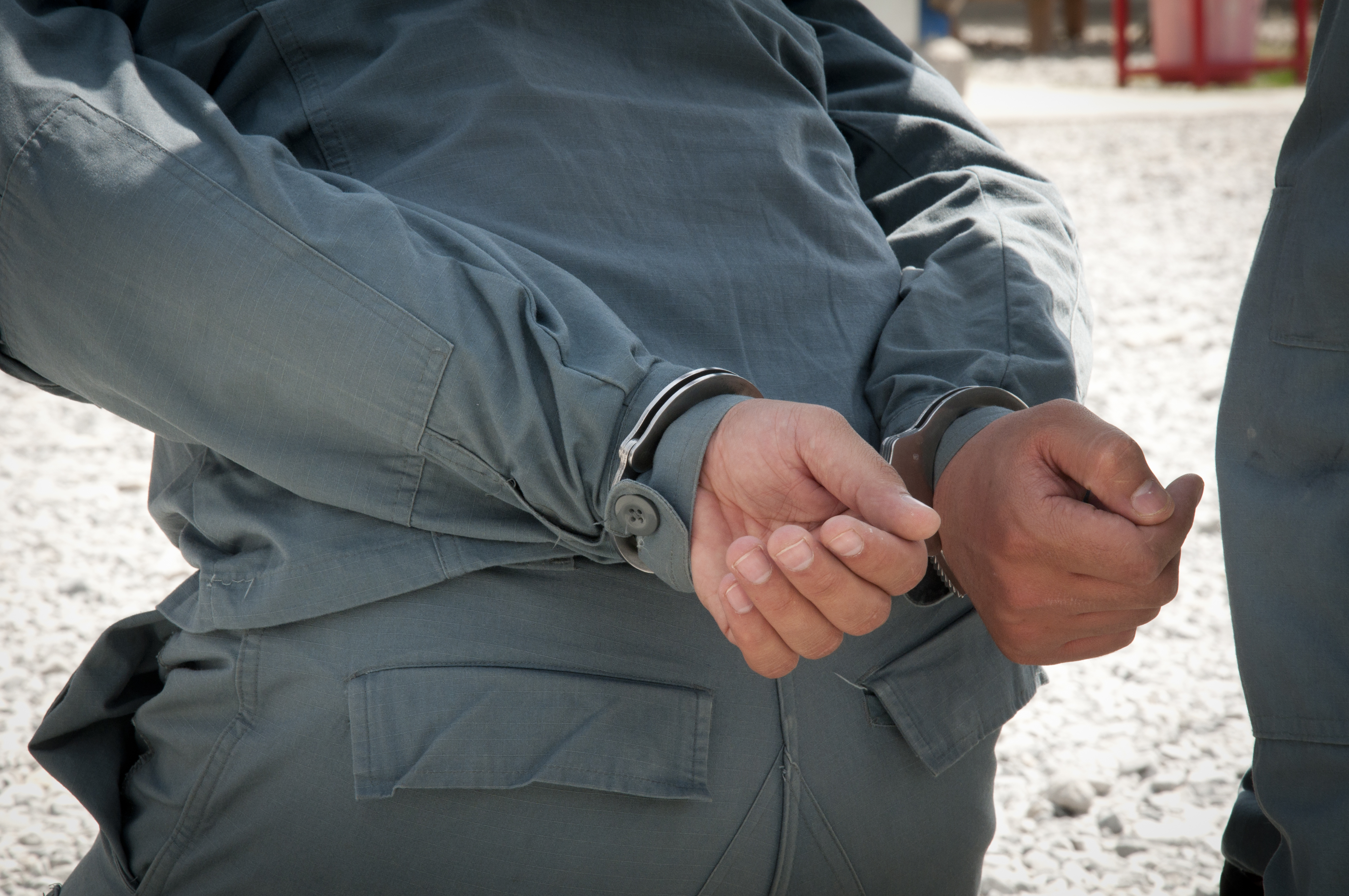
A person handcuffed behind their back.

Handcuffs are restraint devices designed to secure an individual's wrists in proximity to each other. They comprise two parts, linked together by a chain, a hinge, or rigid bar. Each cuff has a rotating arm which engages with a ratchet that prevents it from being opened once closed around a person's wrist. Without a key, handcuffs cannot be removed without specialist knowledge, and a handcuffed person cannot move their wrists more than a few centimetres or inches apart, making many tasks difficult or impossible.

Handcuffs are frequently used by law enforcement agencies worldwide to prevent suspected criminals from escaping from police custody.

== Styles ==
=== Metal handcuffs ===
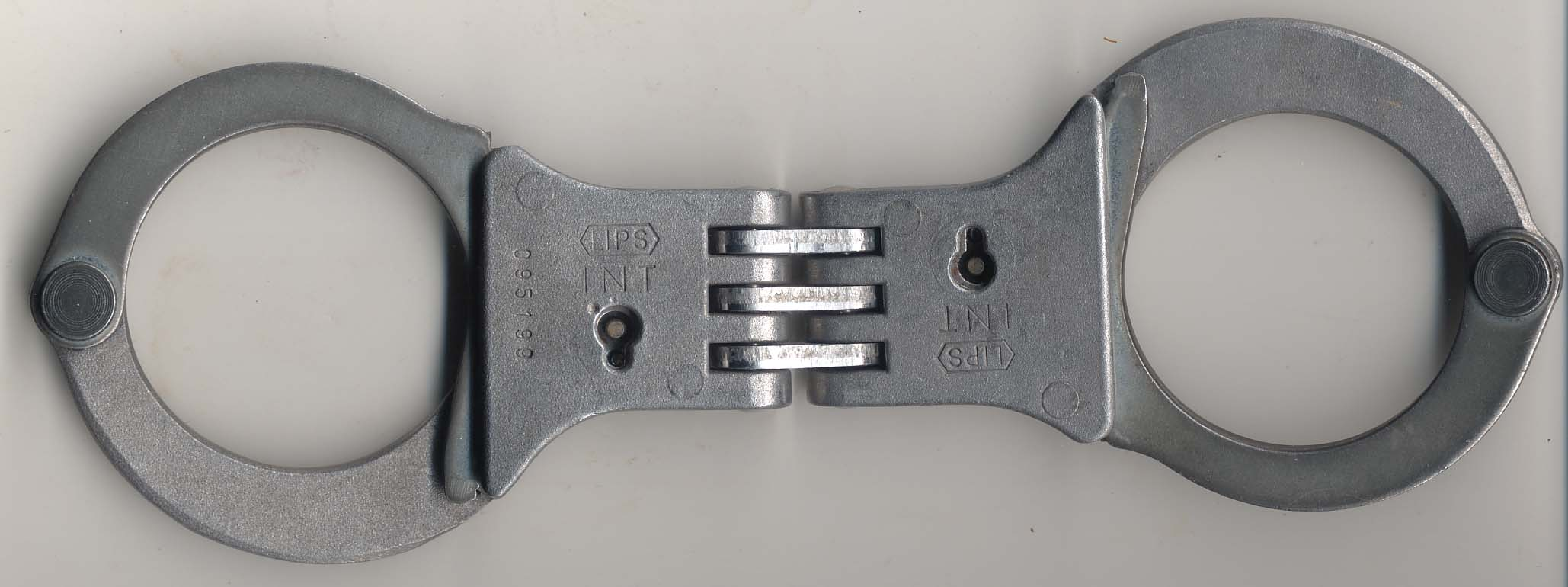
Hinged handcuffs used by Dutch police

There are three main types of contemporary metal handcuffs: chain (cuffs are held together by a short chain), hinged (since hinged handcuffs permit less movement than a chain cuff, they are generally considered to be more secure), and rigid solid bar handcuffs. While bulkier to carry, rigid handcuffs permit several variations in cuffing. Hiatts Speedcuffs are rigid handcuffs used by most police forces in the United Kingdom. Both rigid and hinged cuffs can be used one-handed to apply pain-compliance/control techniques that are not workable with the chain type of cuff. Various accessories are available to improve the security or increase the rigidity of handcuffs, including boxes that fit over the chain or hinge and can themselves be locked with a padlock.

In 1933 the Royal Canadian Mounted Police used a type called "Mitten Handcuffs" to prevent criminals from being able to grab an object like the officer's gun. While used by some in law enforcement it was never popular.

Handcuffs may be manufactured from various metals, including carbon steel, stainless steel and aluminium, or from synthetic polymers.

Sometimes two pairs of handcuffs are needed to restrain a person with an exceptionally large waistline because the hands cannot be brought close enough together; in this case, one cuff on one pair of handcuffs is handcuffed to one of the cuffs on the other pair, and then the remaining open handcuff on each pair is applied to the person's wrists. Oversized handcuffs are available from a number of manufacturers.

The National Museum of Australia has a number of handcuffs in its collection dating from the late 19th and early 20th centuries. These include 'T'-type 'Come Along', 'D'-type and 'Figure-8' handcuffs.

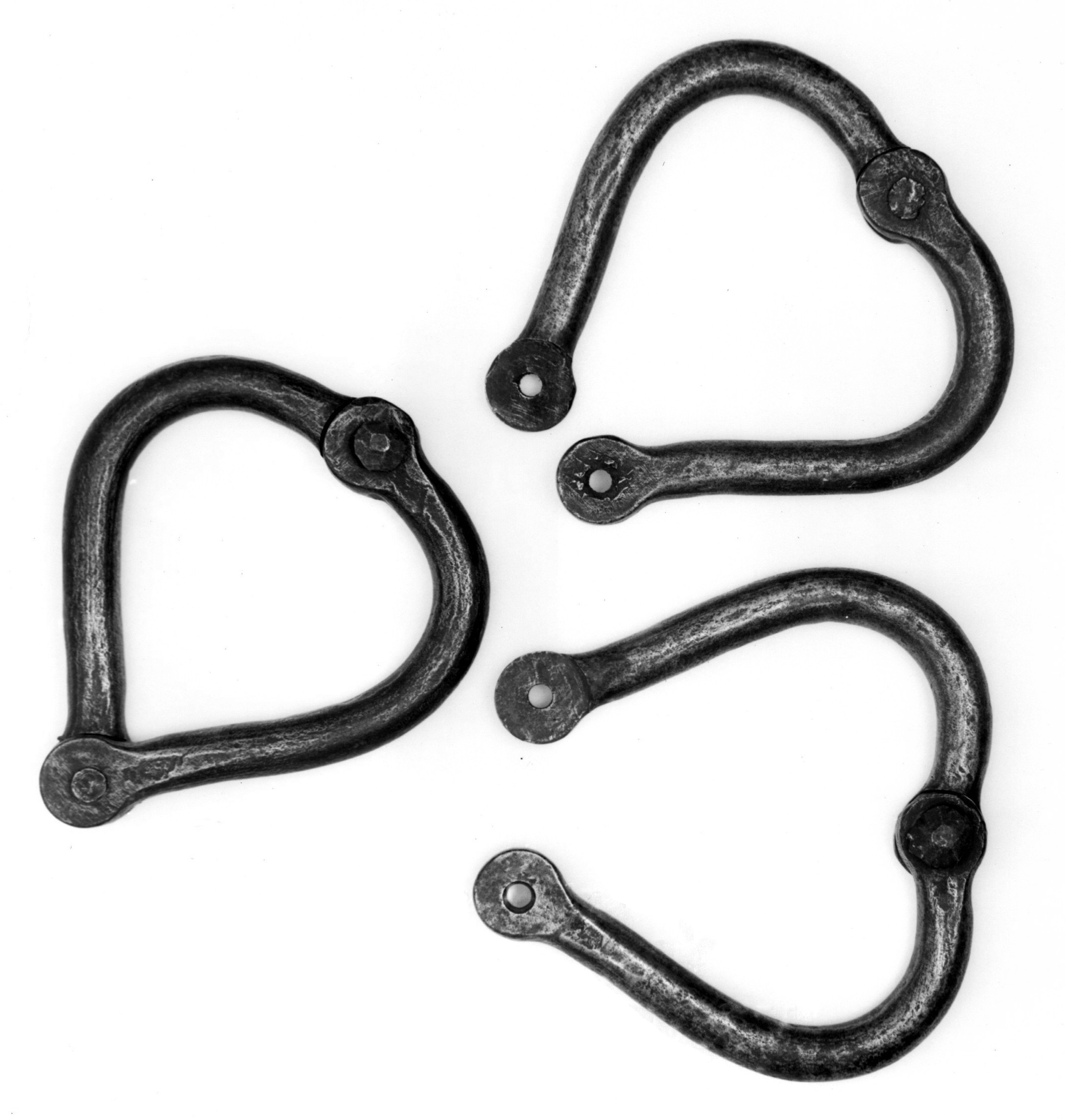
Handcuffs which were worn by the suspects while being tried for assassinating President Lincoln.

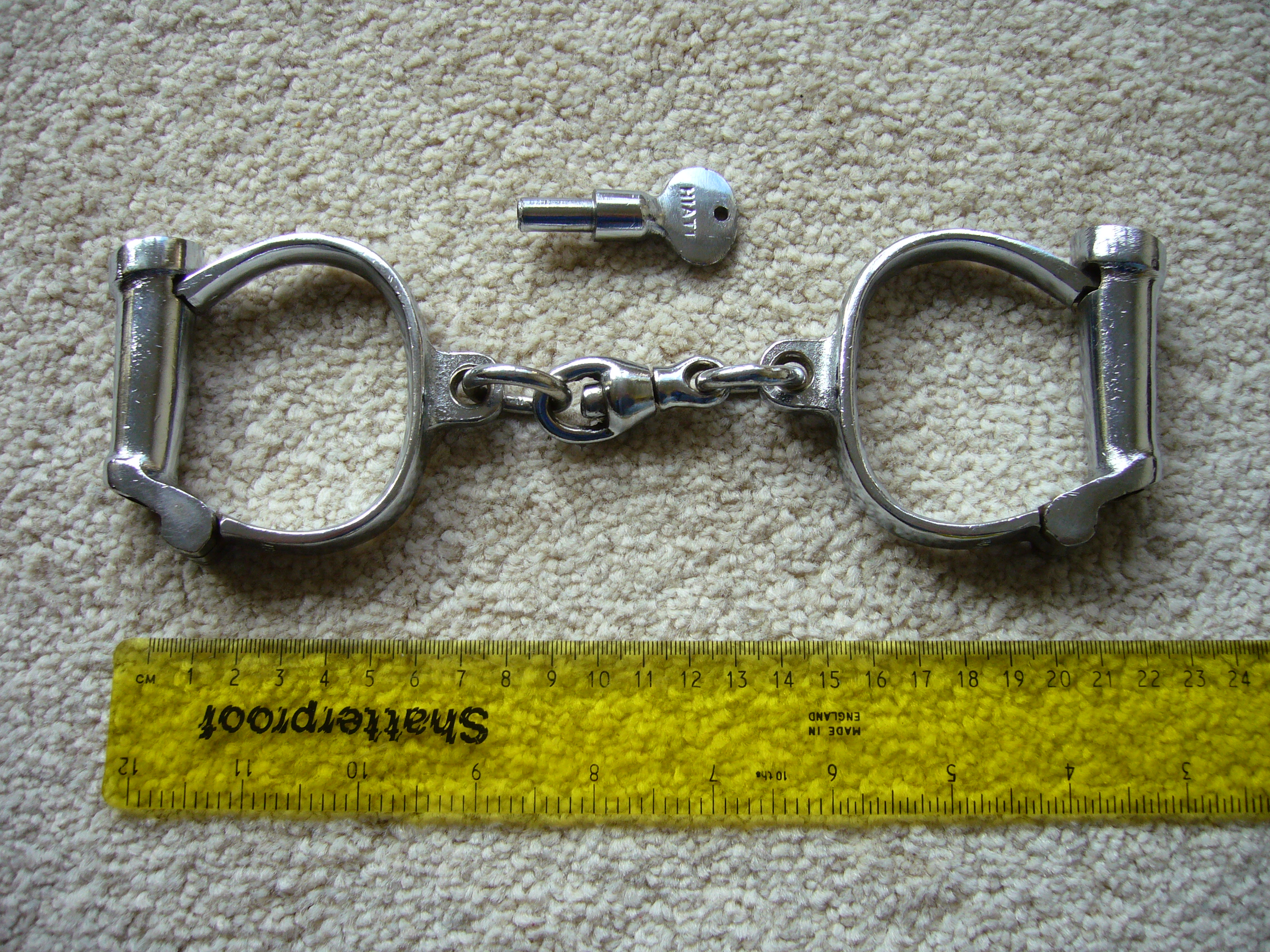
Hiatt type 104 "Darby" handcuffs and key. c. 1950s

=== Plastic handcuffs ===
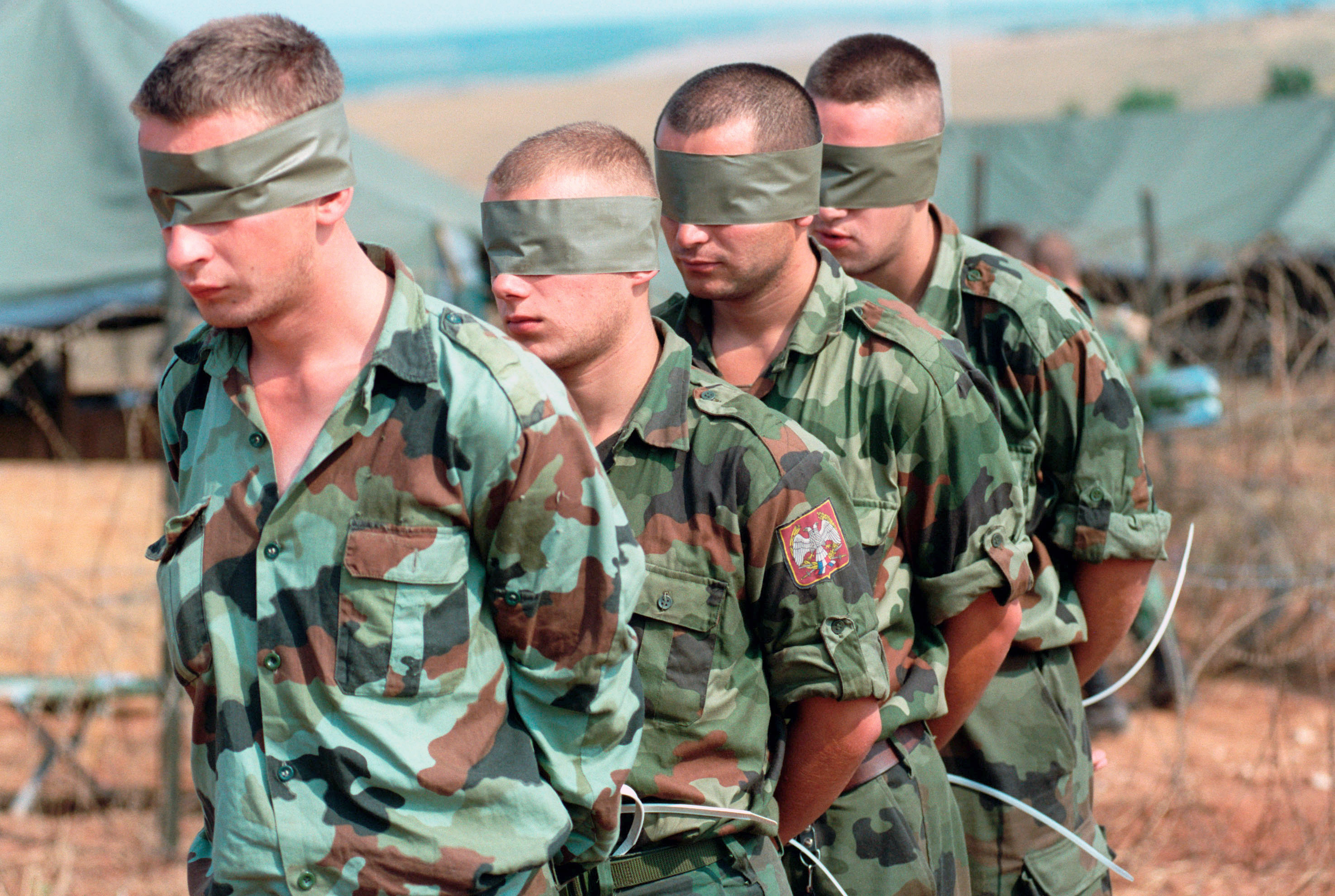
Zip-tied Yugoslav prisoners of war in July 1999, following the Kosovo War

Plastic restraints, known as wrist ties, riot cuffs, plasticuffs, flexicuffs, flex-cuffs, tri-fold cuffs, zapstraps, zipcuffs, or zip-strips, are lightweight, disposable plastic strips resembling electrical cable ties. They can be carried in large quantities by soldiers and police and are therefore well-suited for situations where many may be needed, such as during large-scale protests and riots. In recent years, airlines have begun to carry plastic handcuffs as a way to restrain disruptive passengers. Disposable restraints could be considered to be cost-inefficient; they cannot be loosened, and must be cut off to permit a restrained subject to be fingerprinted, or to attend to bodily functions. It is not unheard of for a single subject to receive five or more sets of disposable restraints in their first few hours in custody.

However, aforementioned usage means that cheap handcuffs are available in situations where steel ones would normally lie unused for long times. Recent products have been introduced that serve to address this concern, including disposable plastic restraints that can be opened or loosened with a key; more expensive than conventional plastic restraints, they can only be used a very limited number of times, and are not as strong as conventional disposable restraints, let alone modern metal handcuffs. In addition, plastic restraints are believed by many to be more likely to inflict nerve or soft-tissue damage to the wearer than metal handcuffs.

=== Legcuffs ===
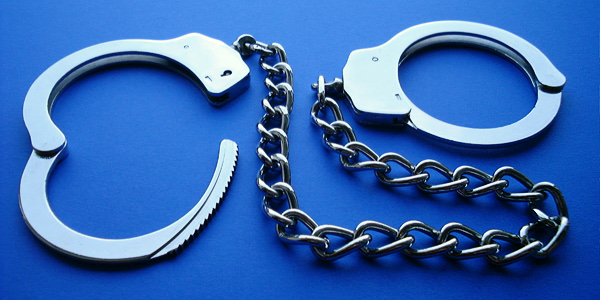
Standard type legcuffs made in Taiwan

Legcuffs are similar to handcuffs, but have a larger inner perimeter so that they fit around a person's ankles. Some models consist of elliptically contoured cuffs so that they widely adapt to the anatomy of the ankle, minimizing pressure on the Achilles' tendon. Standard-type leg irons have a longer chain connecting the two cuffs compared to handcuffs.

On occasions when a suspect exhibits extremely aggressive behavior, leg irons may be used in addition to handcuffs; sometimes the chain connecting the leg irons to one another is looped around the chain of the handcuffs, and then the leg irons are applied, resulting in the person being "hog-tied". In a few rare cases, hog-tied persons lying on their stomachs have died from positional asphyxia, making the practice highly controversial, and leading to its being severely restricted, or even completely banned, in many localities.

Legcuffs are also used when transporting prisoners outside of a secure area to prevent attempts to escape. When being placed in standard legcuffs, the prisoner will still have the possibility to manage normal steps and can therefore walk independently, but is prevented from running. When the connecting chain between the legcuffs is shortened, the prisoner will have even difficulties to walk so that the flight risk is further minimized. In this case, the prisoner will have to be carried by the transporting officers or has to be moved in a wheelchair.

In some countries, prisoners are permanently shackled with legcuffs even when they are held in their cells. Such a long term use of leg shackles may soon result in pressure marks on the prisoner's ankles and will cause serious harm. Therefore, such a treatment of prisoners is commonly considered a cruel and unusual punishment.

=== Combinations ===
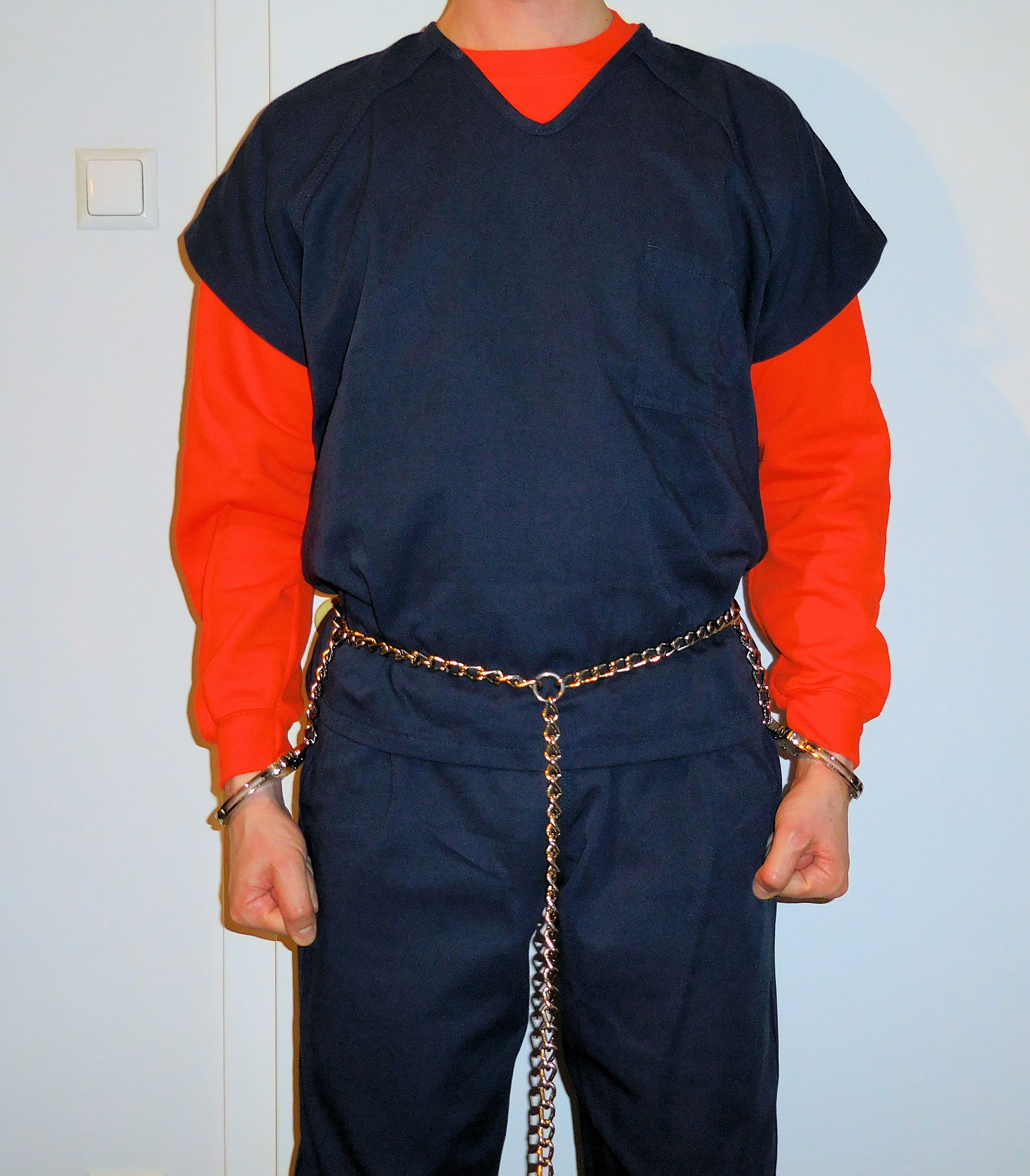
Prisoner in "full harness" combination

Some prisoners being transported from custody to outside locations, for appearances at court, to medical facilities, etc., will wear handcuffs augmented with a belly chain. In this type of arrangement a metal, leather, or canvas belt is attached to the waist, sometimes with a locking mechanism. The handcuffs are secured to the belly chain and the prisoner's hands are kept at waist level. This allows a relative degree of comfort for the prisoner during prolonged internment in the securing device, while providing a greater degree of restriction to movement than simply placing the handcuffs on the wrists in the front. When the handcuffs are concealed by a handcuff cover and secured at the prisoner's waist by a belly chain, this combination will result in a rather more severe restraint and the restrained person may feel discomfort or even pain.

For added security, some transport restraints have a pair of leg irons connected to a pair of handcuffs or a belly chain by a longer connector chain. These combinations further restrict the detainee's freedom of movement and prevent them from escaping.

== Security ==
=== Double locks ===
Handcuffs with double locks have a detent which when engaged stops the cuff from ratcheting tighter to prevent the wearer from tightening them. Tightening could be intentional or by struggling; if tightened, the handcuffs may cause nerve damage or loss of circulation. Also some wearers could tighten the cuffs to attempt an escape by having the officer loosen the cuffs and attempting to escape while the cuffs are loose. Double locks also make picking the locks more difficult.

There exist three kinds of double locks as described in a Smith & Wesson brochure:

Lever lock
Movement of a lever on the cuff causes the detent to move into a position that locks the bolt. No tool is required to double lock this type of cuff.
Push pin lock
A small peg on the key is inserted endwise into a hole to engage the detent.
Slot lock
These also are actuated with a peg, but in this case it is inserted into a slot and moved sideways to engage the detent.

Double locks are generally disengaged by inserting the key and rotating it in the opposite direction from that used to unlock the cuff.

=== Keys ===
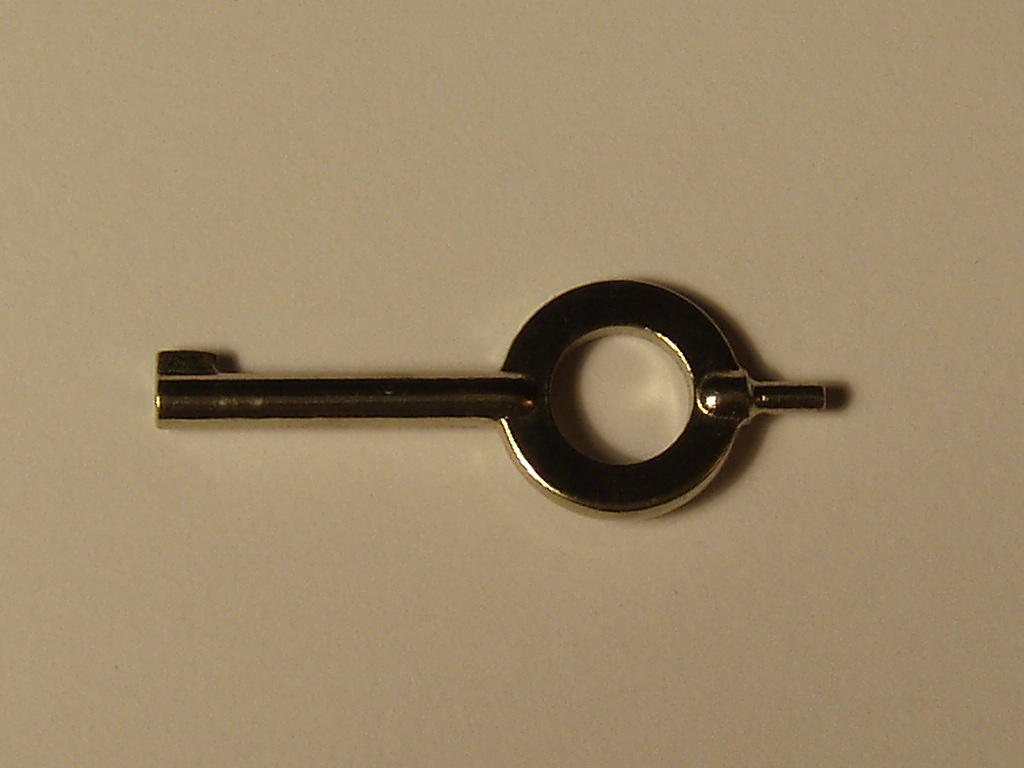
Universal handcuff key

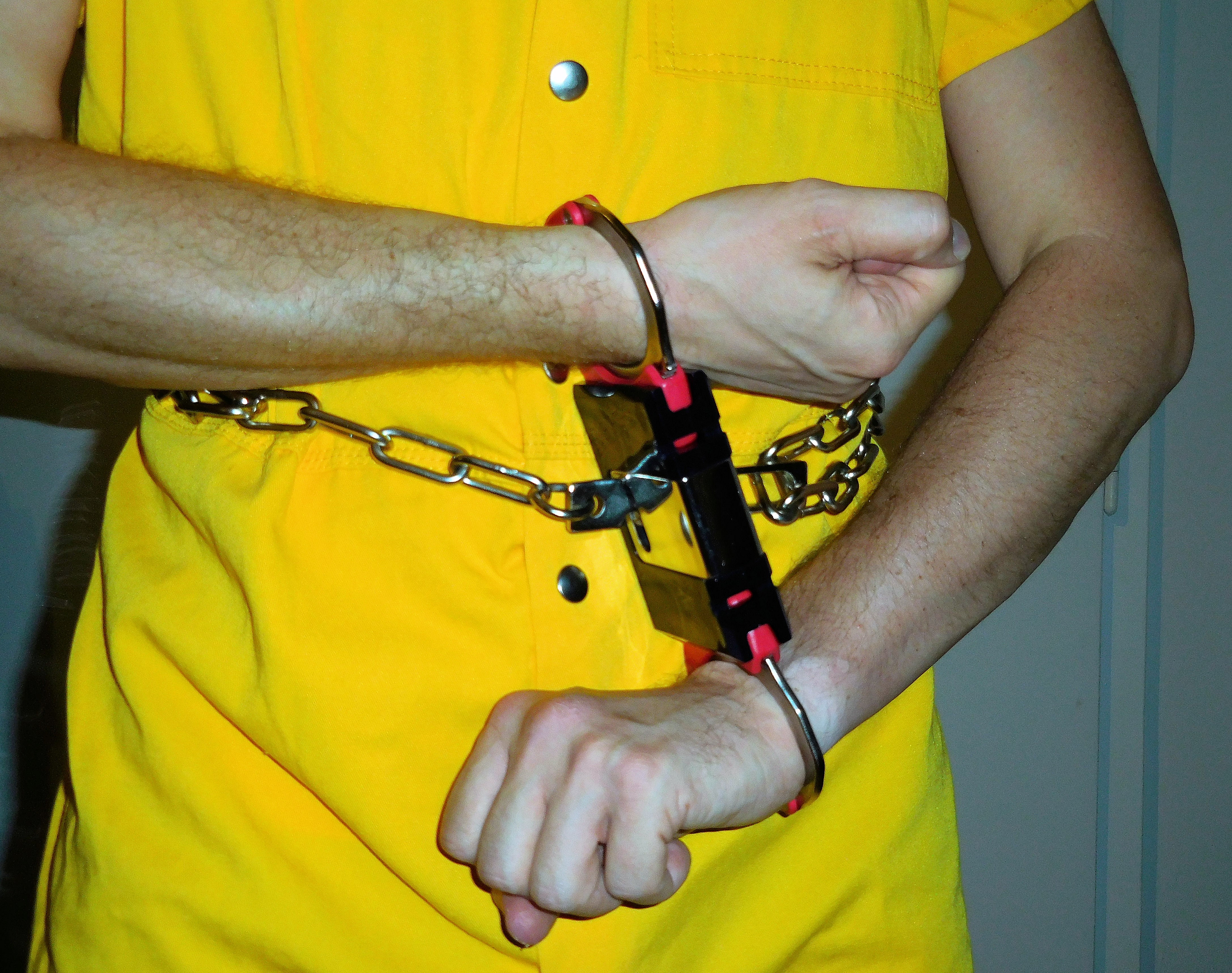
An inmate in handcuffs and a belly chain with a handcuff cover, concealing the keyholes

Most modern handcuffs in the United States, the United Kingdom and Latin America can be opened with the same standard universal handcuff key. This allows for easier transport of prisoners. However, there are handcuff makers who use keys based on different standards. Maximum security handcuffs require special keys. Handcuff keys usually do not work with thumbcuffs. The Cuff Lock handcuff key padlock uses this same standard key.

To prevent the restrained person from eventually opening the handcuffs with a handcuff key, a handcuff cover may be used to conceal the keyholes of the handcuffs.

=== Hinged and rigid handcuffs ===
When applied behind the back with keyholes away from the hands, handcuffs connected by a hinge or rigid bar are much more secure than handcuffs connected by a chain. Even with a key in hand it is difficult or impossible to reach the keyholes with it.

== Hand positioning ==
In the past, police officers typically handcuffed an arrested person with their hands in front, but since approximately the mid-1960s behind-the-back handcuffing has been the standard. The vast majority of police academies in the United States today also teach their recruits to apply handcuffs so that the palms of the suspect's hands face outward after the handcuffs are applied. The Jacksonville, Florida Police Department, the Los Angeles County Sheriff's Department and others are notable exceptions, as they favor palms-together handcuffing. This helps prevent radial neuropathy or handcuff neuropathy during extended periods of restraint. Suspects are handcuffed with the keyholes facing up (away from the hands) to make it difficult to open them even with a key or improvised lock-pick.

Because a person's hands are used in breaking falls, being handcuffed introduces a significant risk of injury if the prisoner trips or stumbles, in addition to injuries sustained from overly tight handcuffs causing handcuff neuropathy. Police officers having custody of the person need to be ready to catch a stumbling prisoner.

As soon as restraints go on, the officer has full liability. The risk of the prisoner losing balance is higher if the hands are handcuffed behind the back than if they are handcuffed in front; however, the risk of using fisted hands together as a weapon increases with hands in front.

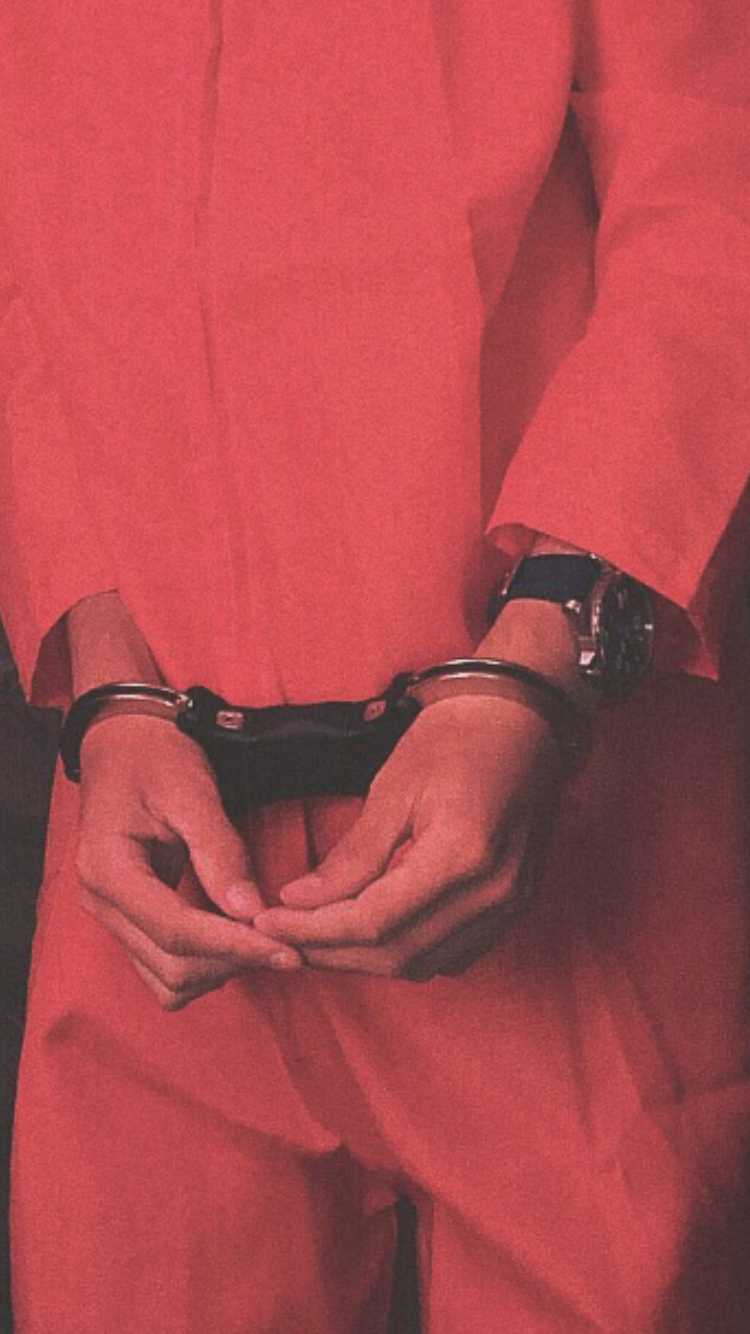
Handcuffed to the front

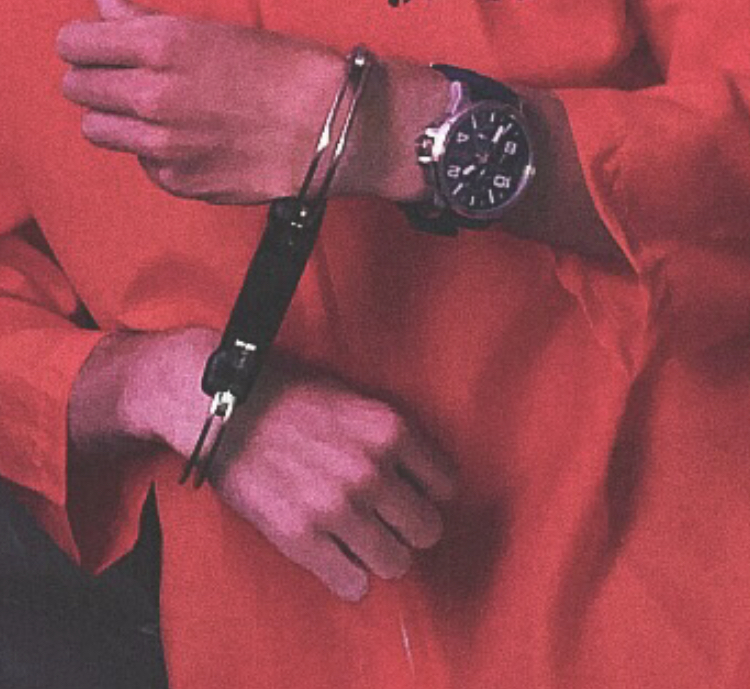
Handcuffed in the front stack position

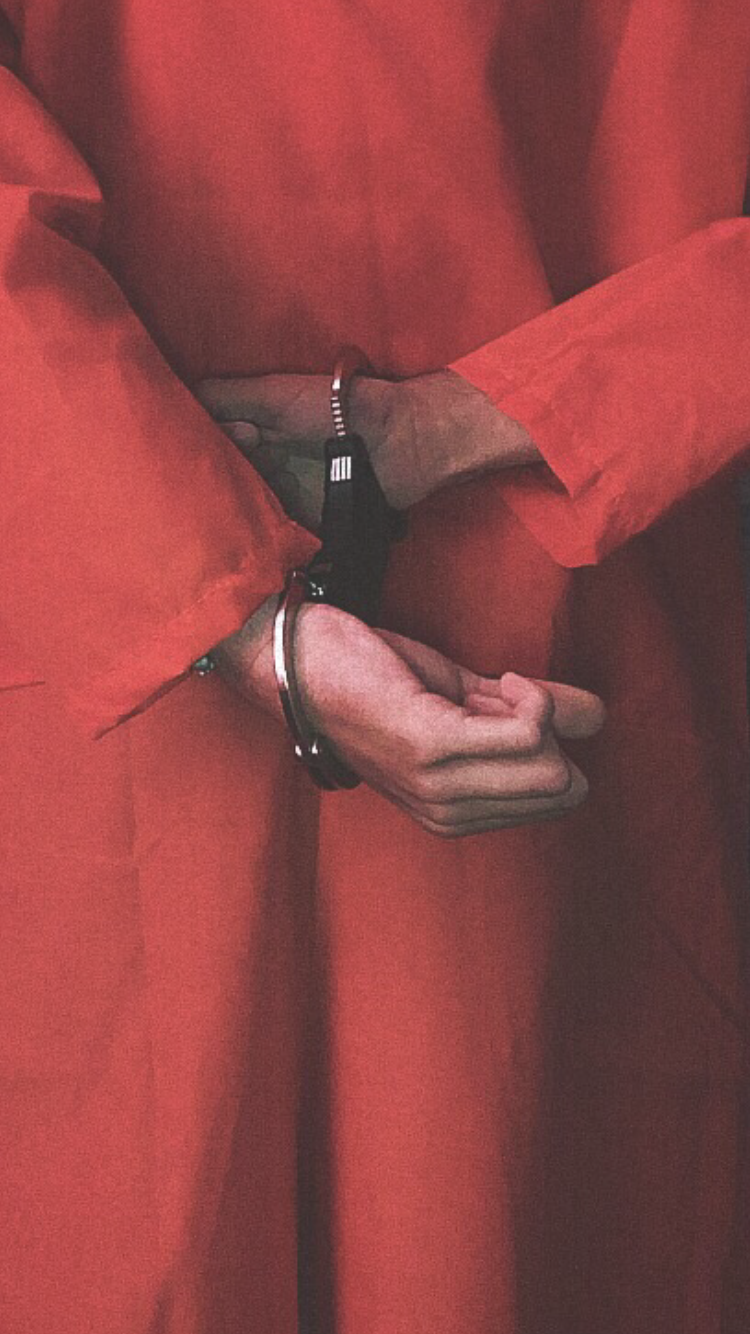
Handcuffed in the back stack position

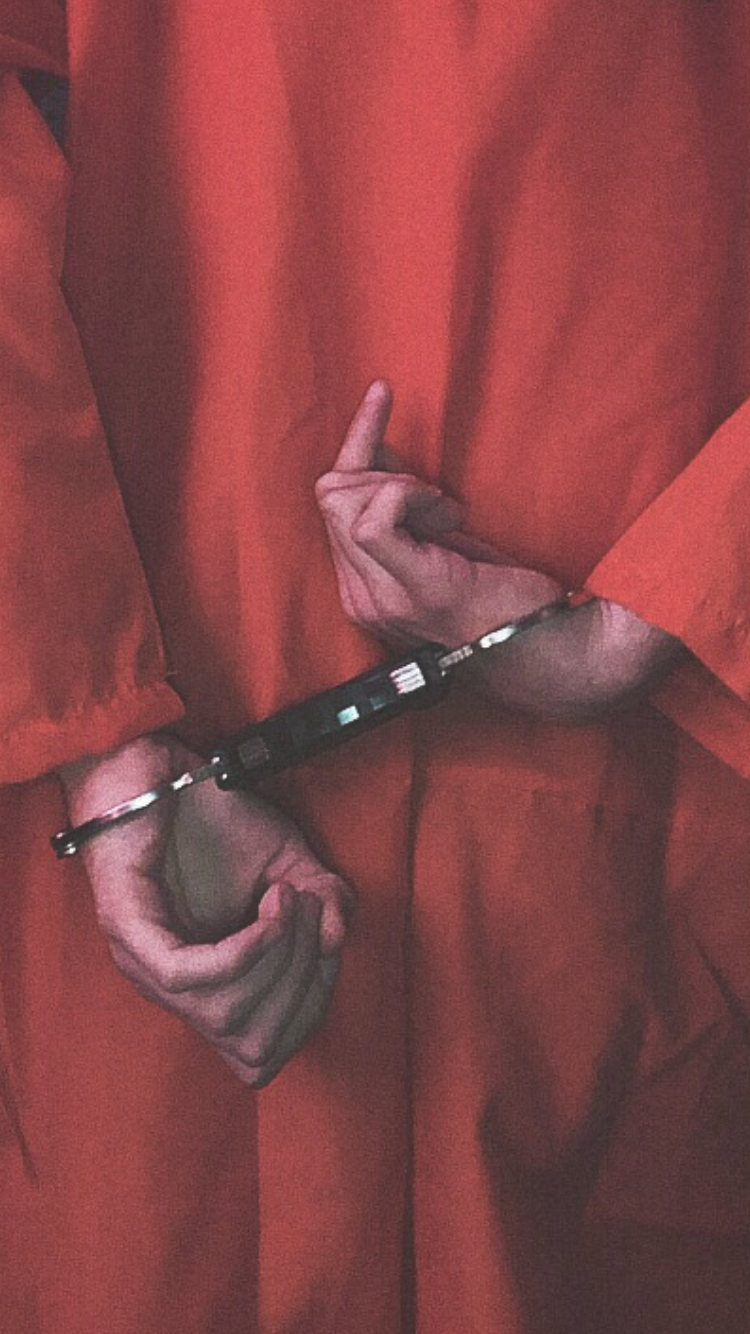
Handcuffed in the stack position

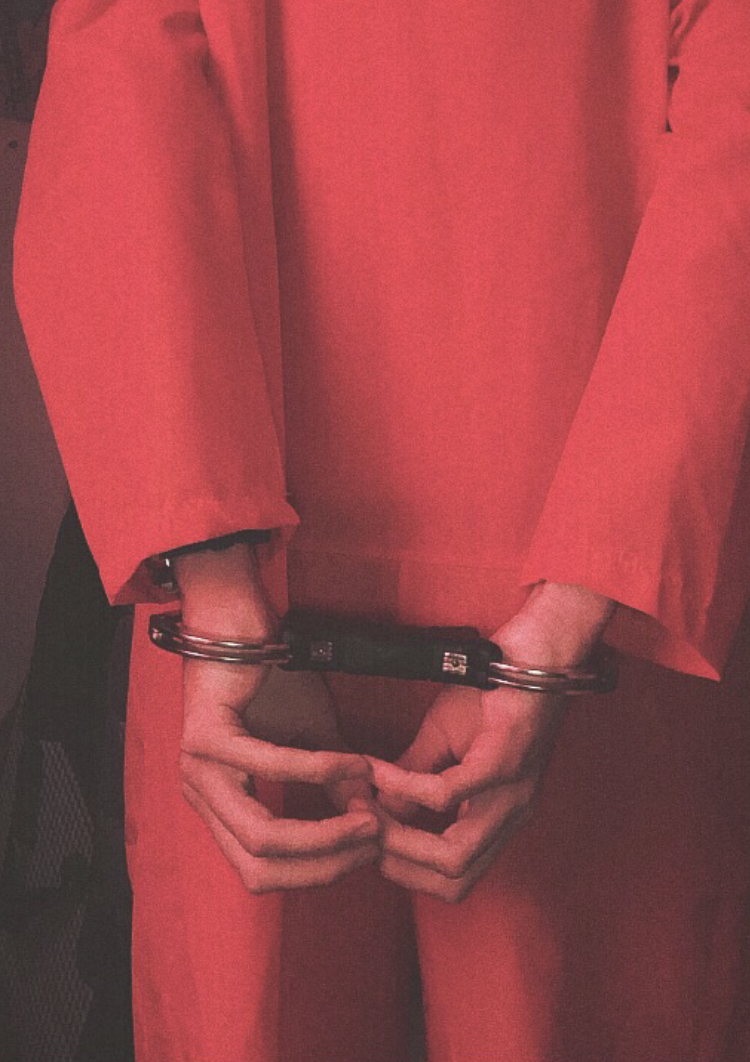
Handcuffed to the back

== Escaping ==
Since handcuffs are only intended as temporary restraints, they are not the most complicated of locks.

There are several ways of escaping from handcuffs:

1. slipping hands out when the hands are smaller than the wrist
2. lock picking
3. releasing the pawl with a shim
4. opening the handcuffs with a duplicate key, often hidden on the body of the performer before the performance.

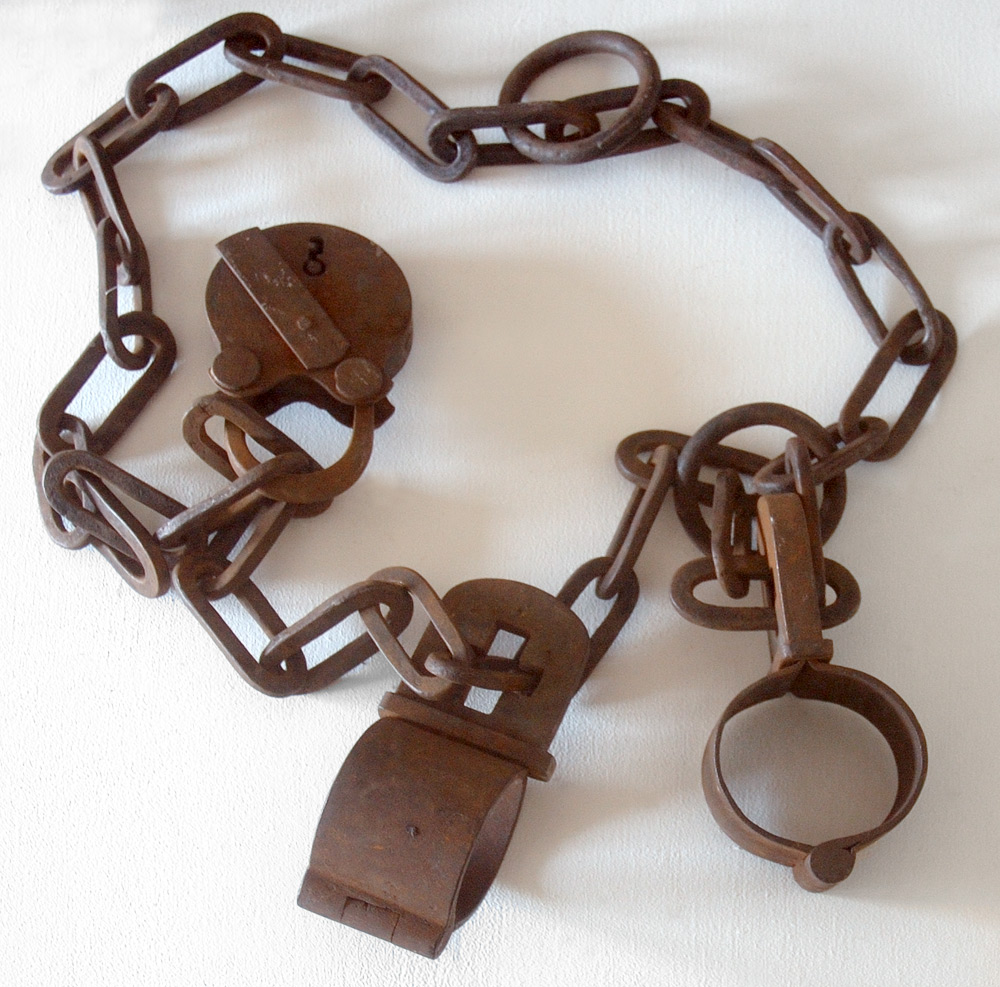
Old handcuffs

The above methods are often used in escapology. As most people's hands are larger than their wrists, the first method was much easier before the invention of modern ratchet cuffs, which can be adjusted to a variety of sizes. Modern handcuffs are generally ratcheted until they are too tight to be slipped off the hands. However, slipping out of ratchet cuffs is still possible. During his shows, Harry Houdini was frequently secured with multiple pairs of handcuffs. Any pair that was too difficult to be picked was placed on his upper arms. Being very muscular, his upper arms were far larger than his hands. Once he had picked the locks on the lower pairs of handcuffs, the upper pair could simply be slipped off.

It is also technically possible to break free from handcuffs by applying massive amounts of force from one's arms to cause the device to split apart or loosen enough to squeeze one's hands through; however, this takes exceptional strength (especially with handcuffs made of steel). This also puts an immense amount of pressure on the biceps and triceps muscles, and when tried by suspects (even unsuccessfully) can lead to injury, including bruising around the wrists, or tearing the muscles used (including pulling them off their attachments to the bones).

Another common method of escaping (or attempting to escape) from being handcuffed behind the back, is that one would, from a sitting or lying position, bring one's legs up as high upon one's torso as possible, then push one's arms down to bring the handcuffs below one's feet, finally pulling the handcuffs up using one's arms to the front of one's body. This can lead to awkward or painful positions depending on how the handcuffs were applied, and typically requires a good amount of flexibility. It can also be done from a standing position, where, with some degree of effort, the handcuffed hands are slid around the hips and down the buttocks to the feet; then sliding each foot up and over the cuffs. These maneuvers, and the reverse (otherwise impossible) maneuver of bringing the handcuffed hands up behind the back and forwards over the head and then down in front, can be done fairly easily by some people who were born without collarbones because of the inherited deformity called cleidocranial dysostosis.

From this position, one has a better chance of attempting to use a tool (such as a shim or lockpick) to work one's way out of the handcuffs.

== National regulations regarding depiction of handcuffed suspects ==
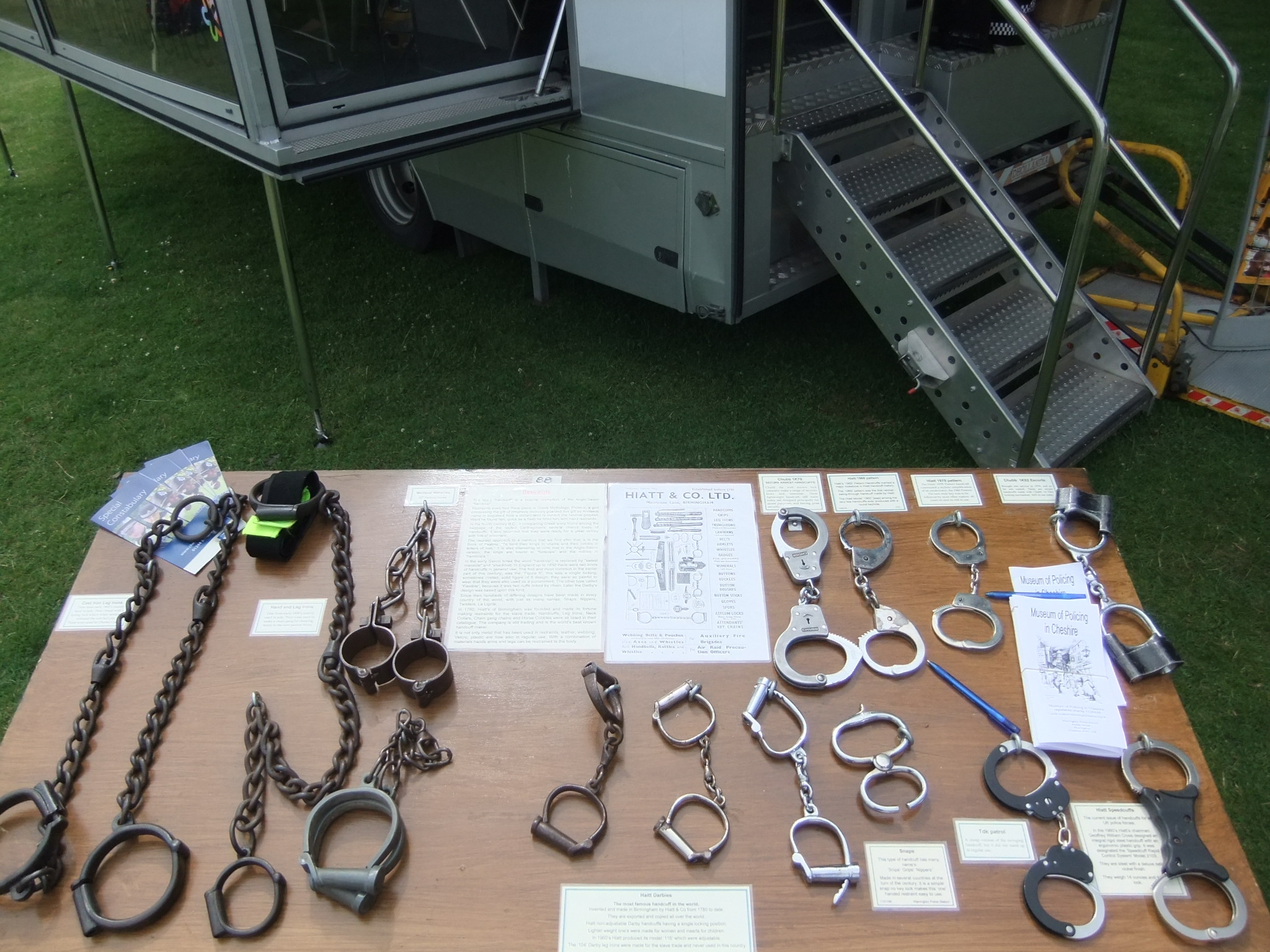
Display of old handcuffs, Tatton Park Flower Show, 2010

In Japan, if an arrested suspect of crime was photographed or filmed while handcuffed, their hands have to be pixelated if it is used on TV or in the newspapers. This is because Kazuyoshi Miura, who had been arrested on suspicion of the murder of his wife, brought a successful case to court arguing that being pictured in handcuffs implied guilt, and had prejudiced the trial.

Similarly, in France, a law prohibits media from airing images of people in handcuffs, or otherwise restrained, before they have been convicted by a court. Also in Italy the Code of criminal procedure prohibits the publication of images of people deprived of personal liberty while they are handcuffed or subjected to other means of physical coercion. According to the Italian independent authority on data protection, the same prohibition applies when the image of the handcuffs is pixelated.

In Hong Kong, people being arrested and led away in handcuffs are usually given the chance by the policemen to have their heads covered by a black cloth bag.

In Sri Lanka, women are generally not handcuffed by the police.

The High Court in Windhoek, Namibia, prohibited in 2020 the use of handcuffs on people who have not been convicted, as it violates the constitution.

== Use in BDSM ==
Police handcuffs are sometimes used in sexual bondage and BDSM activities. This is potentially unsafe, because they were not designed for this purpose, and their use can result in nerve injury (handcuff neuropathy) or other tissue damage. Bondage cuffs were designed specifically for this application. They were designed using the same model of soft restraints used on psychiatric patients because they can be worn for long periods of time. Many such models can be fastened shut with padlocks.

== Metaphorical uses ==
Handcuffs are common enough for the word to be used in metaphors, e.g.:

- Golden handcuffs – an incentive given to an employee by a firm, most or all of which must be repaid to the company if the employee leaves the firm within a specified period of time.
- As a verb, meaning to be kept from doing something by another's action or inaction – "He said that his computer work is handcuffed by his internet provider's refusal to accept .zip files."
- In fantasy football, one strategy is to have both a star player and his backup, or "handcuff", on a team's roster of players. If the star is injured, the handcuff will be his likely replacement.
- One of the Spanish terms for "handcuffs", esposas, literally means "wives, (female) spouses".

== Handcuffs gesture ==
In the 'handcuffs gesture' the arms are crossed at the wrists in front of the chest, to represent being handcuffed. Uses are:

- By police, to mean "Allow yourself to be handcuffed".
- It has been known to be used to mean "We support our comrade who has been arrested".
- By José Mourinho at a football match at F.C. Internazionale Milano.

== See also ==
- Belly chain (restraint)
- Bondage cuffs
- Cuffs – a British police procedural series
- Handcuff cover
- Legcuffs
- PlastiCuffs
- Thumbcuffs
