= Handcuff cover =

Law Enforcement security device

External videos
- Tutorial showing the use of handcuff covers and restraint chains
- Sisco Handcuff Security Cover Demonstration
- BOA Handcuff High Security Transport Box Usage Instructions

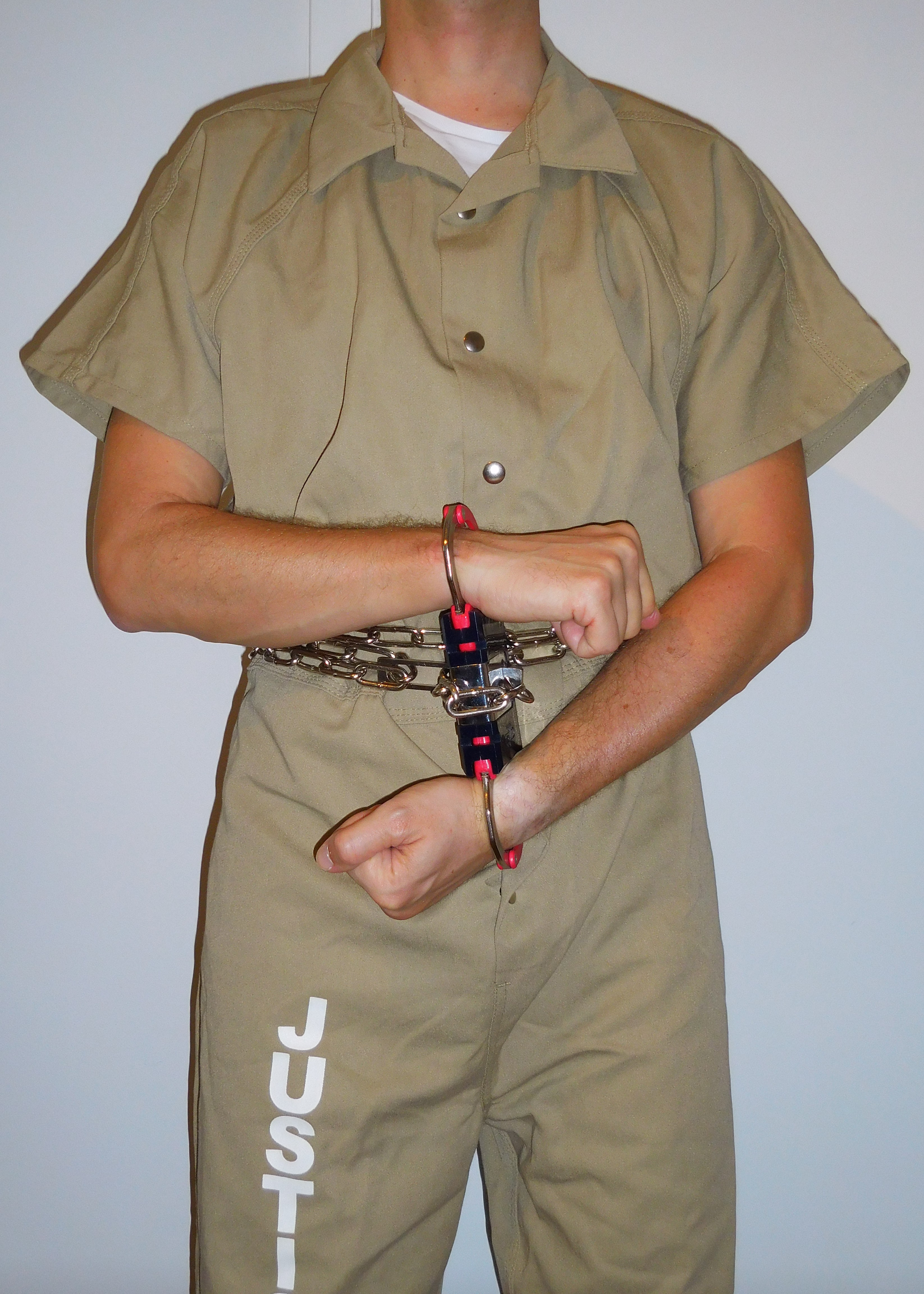
Front stack position

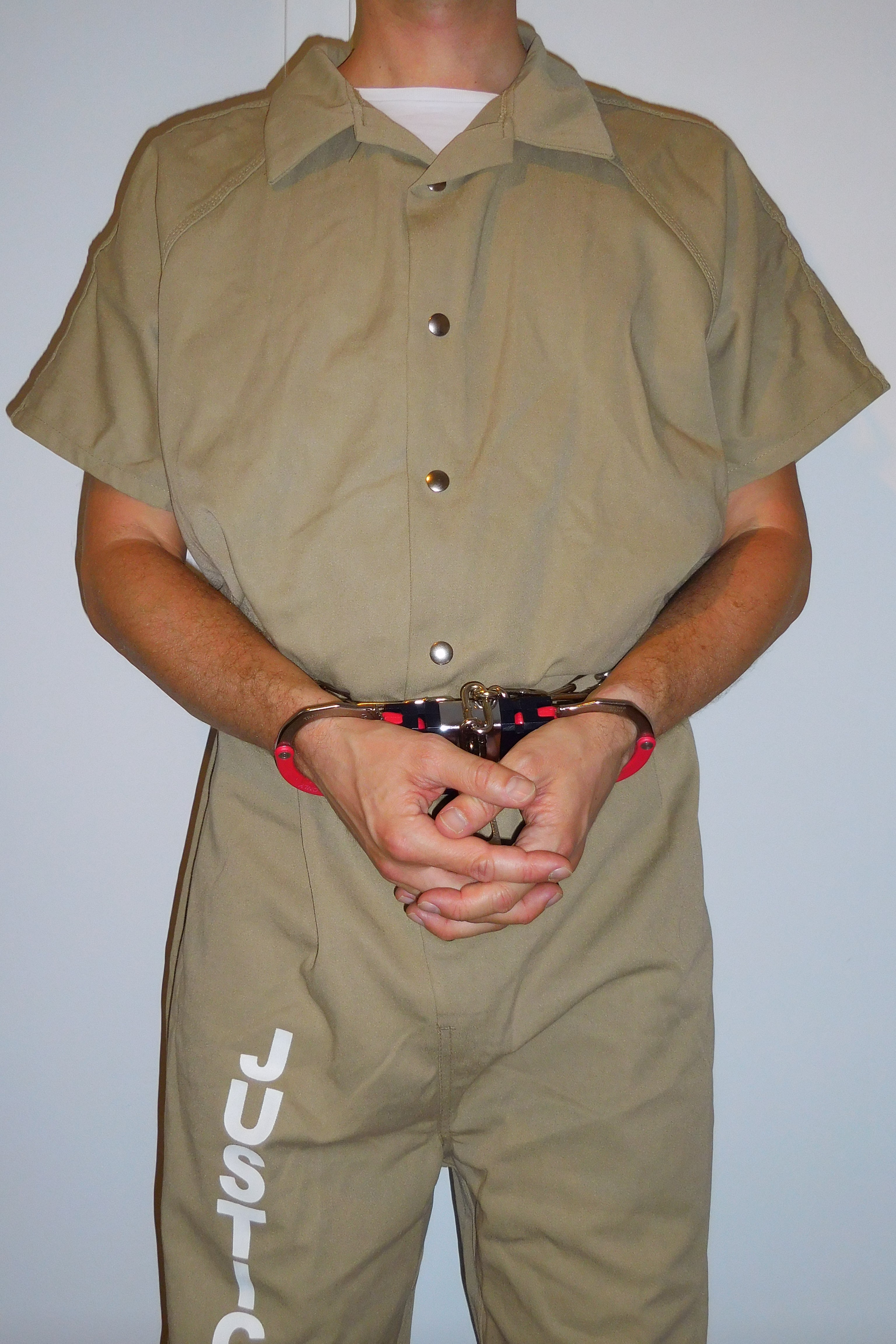
Parallel position

A handcuff cover is a plastic or metal cover that can be placed over a pair of handcuffs. It consists of a hinged, box-like assembly locked over the handcuff chain, wristlets and keyholes.

The first handcuff cover was invented by J. D. Cullip and K. E. Stefansen and patented in 1973. It is made from high-strength, high-impact ABS plastic and is still distributed by C & S Security Inc. as "Black Box" handcuff cover. Other companies sell similar devices, e.g. CTS Thompson ("Blue Box" handcuff cover) or Sisco restraints.

A handcuff cover has two key purposes:

- It converts a pair of standard chain link handcuffs into rigid handcuffs, providing a rather more severe restraint.
- It covers the keyholes of the handcuffs for further security.

In most cases, a handcuff cover is used in combination with a martin link belly chain which fixes the handcuffs at waist level. This provides a rather uncomfortable restraint and may result in injury to the individual if maintained for an extended period of time. When using a handcuff cover in combination with a belly chain, the hands may be cuffed in a parallel or in a stacked position.

In the stacked position, the shackled person's freedom of movement is strongly restricted and the arms are kept in a rather unnatural position which may cause discomfort or even pain because in this arrangement, the individual's wrists are restrained in close proximity to the torso.

In a parallel position, the restraint will cause the wrists to spread outwardly in an angular relationship. As the handcuff cover provides a rigid structure, the individual's wrists may be bruised or cocked, restricting blood circulation. However, some models come with angled ends which allows hands and arms to relax in an appropriate posture, therefore reducing physical stress on the individual being transported.

A handcuff cover can also be linked with a connector chain to a pair of leg irons. Individuals with a handcuff cover fitted over their handcuffs can also be restrained together for transportation using so-called "gang chains".

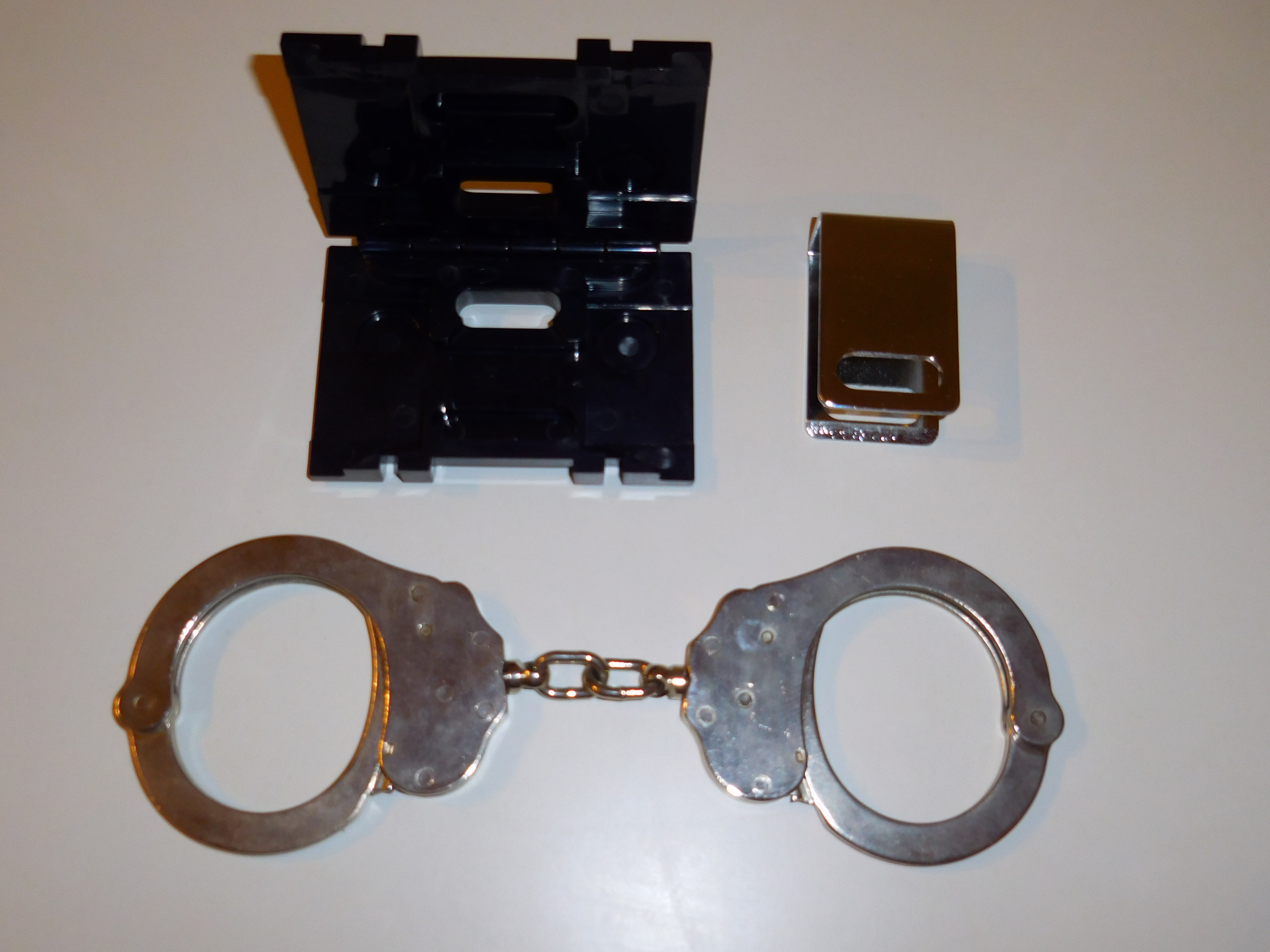
CTS Thompson "Blue Box" handcuff cover

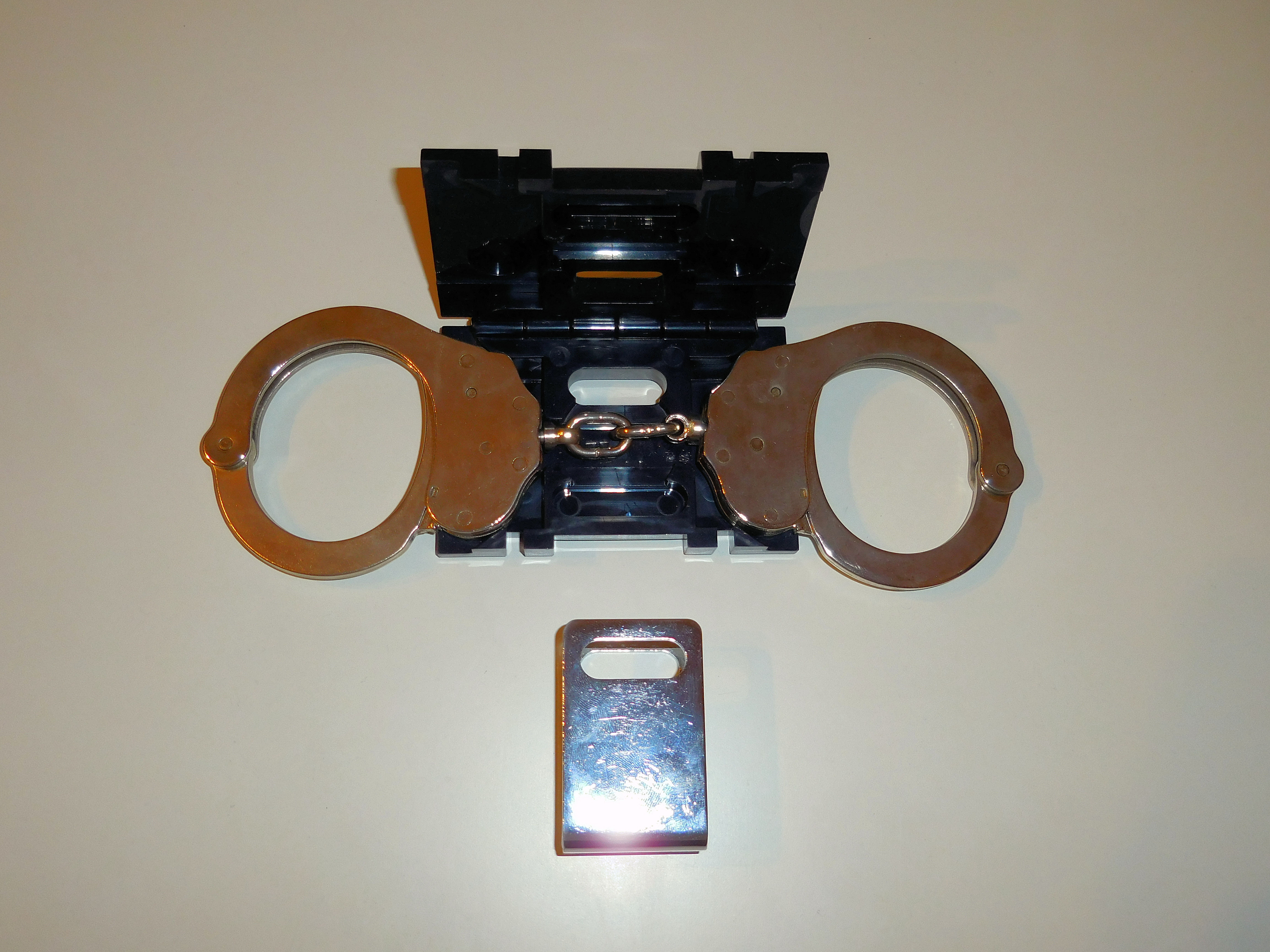
The handcuffs are put into the plastic box.

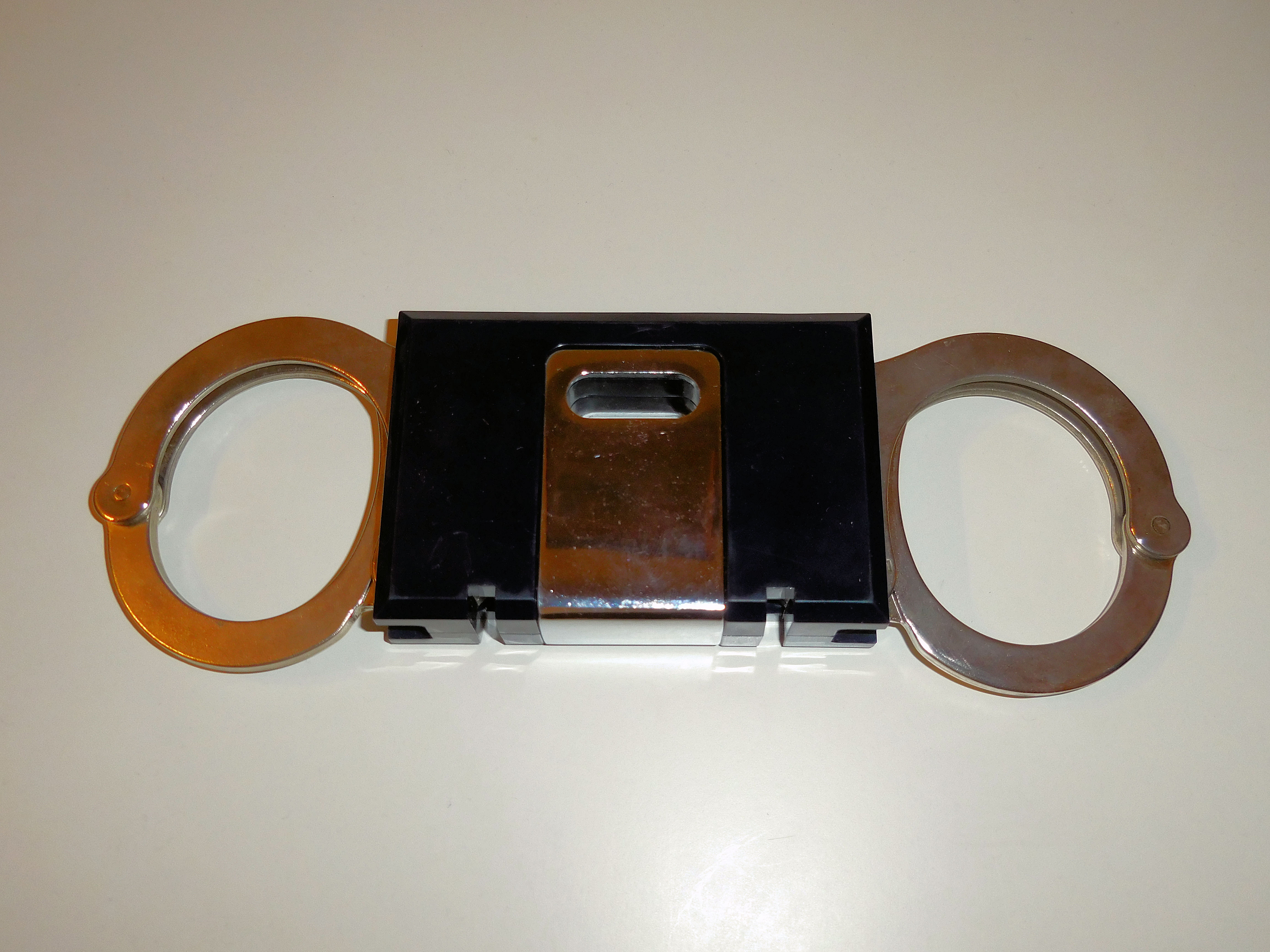
The box is closed and fixed with the metallic slider.

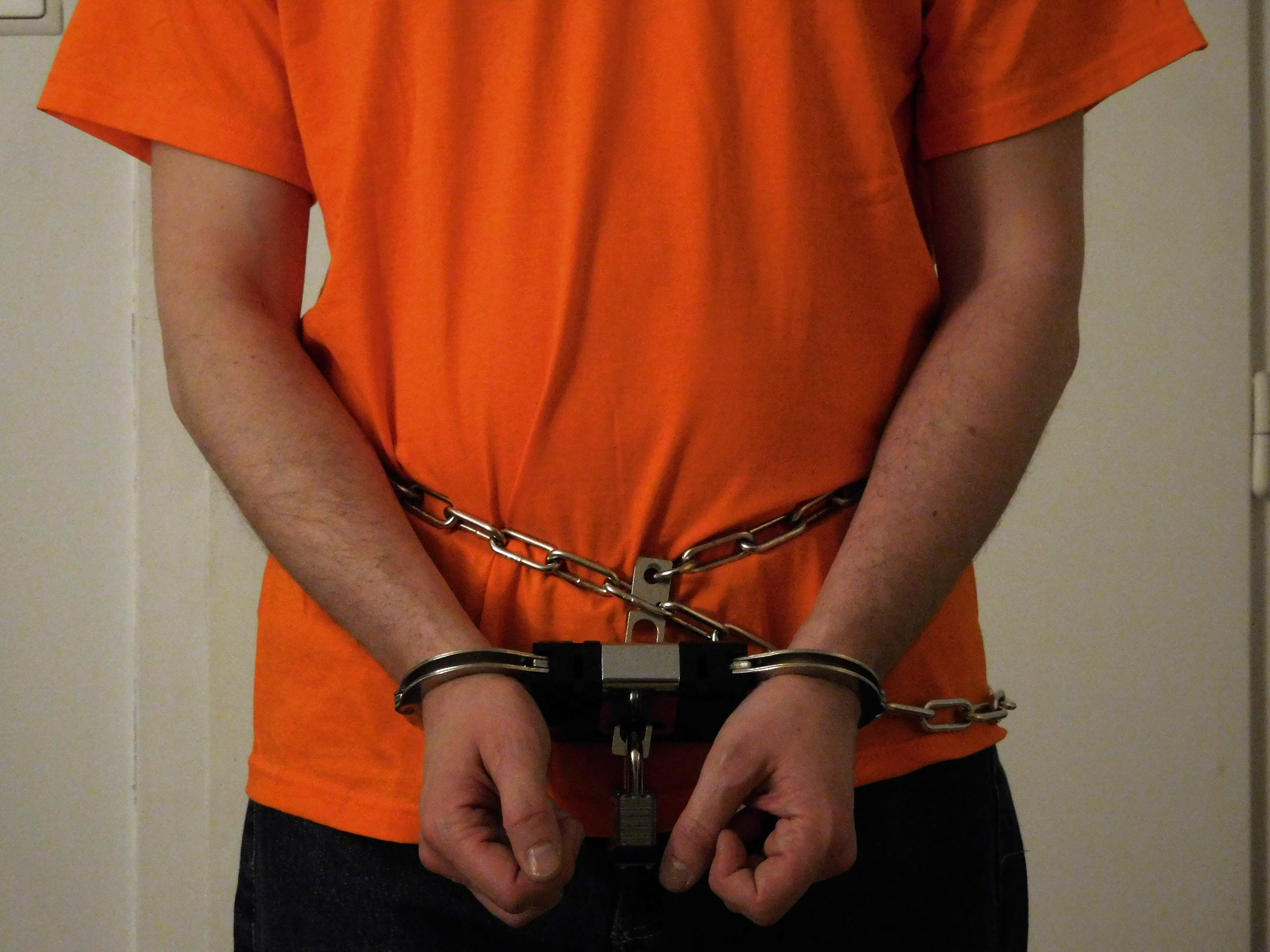
Prisoner in handcuffs with a CTS Thompson "Blue Box" handcuff cover, secured with a belly chain around the prisoner's waist.

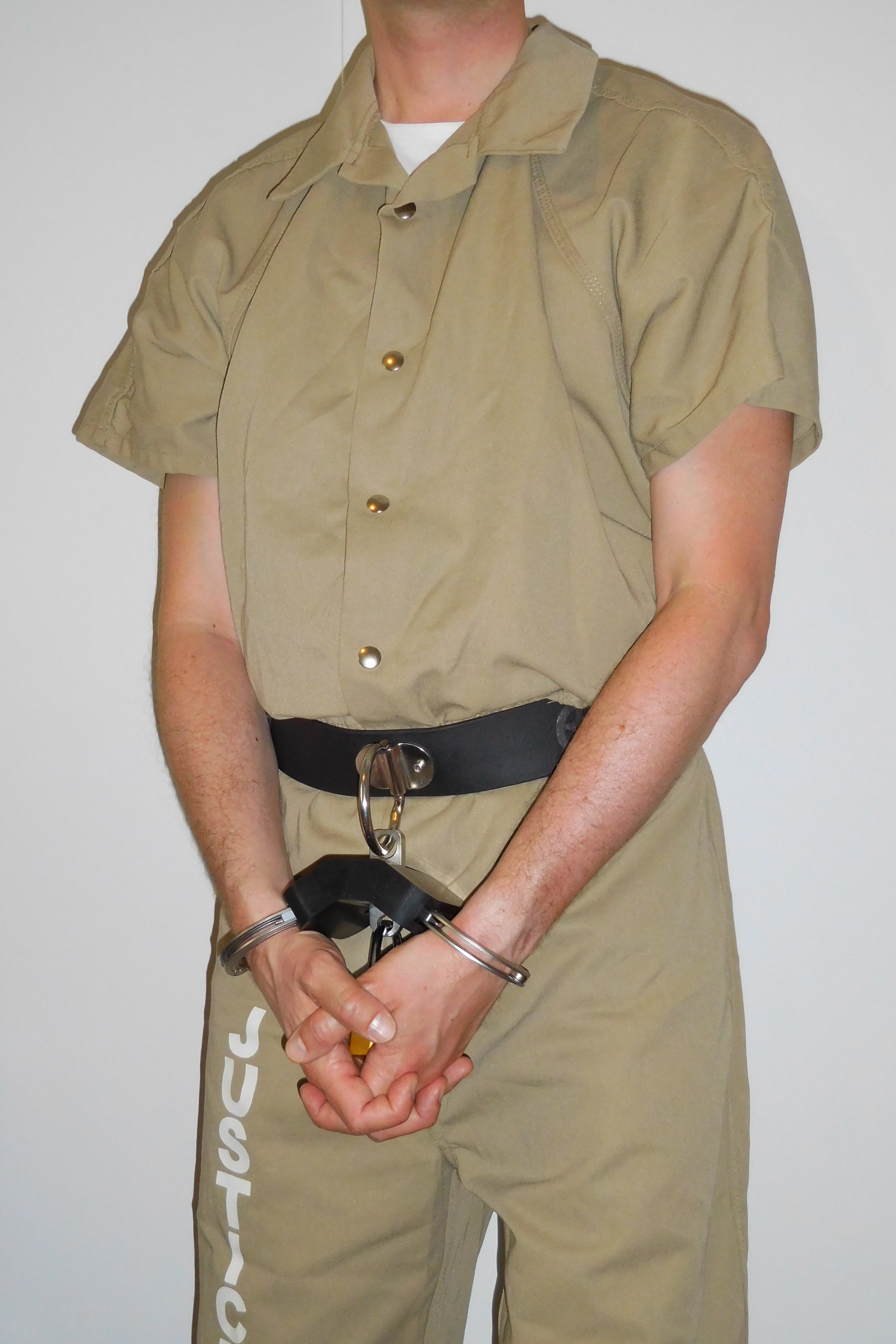
Sisco handcuff cover with angled ends

== See also ==
- Hiatt speedcuffs—A similar device.
