= Enfield South =

Coordinates: 33°53′55″S 151°05′34″E

- Country: Australia
- State: New South Wales
- City: Sydney
- LGA: Municipality of Burwood
- Location: 14 km (8.7 mi) south-west of Sydney CBD

Government
  - State electorate: Strathfield
  - Federal division: Watson
- Postcode: 2133
Localities around Enfield South
Strathfield South	Enfield	Burwood Heights
Belfield	Enfield South	Croydon Park
Belfield	Campsie	Croydon Park

Enfield South is a former locality in the suburb of Croydon Park in the Inner West Sydney, New South Wales, Australia. Enfield South is designated as a neighbourhood by the NSW Geographical Names Board.

== Commercial area ==
The Enfield South neighbourhood is bounded by Mitchell Street to the north, Coronation Parade to the west, Georges River Road to the south, and Burwood Road to the east. The Enfield South post office is located on Tangarra Street. Tangarra Street also features an Italian restaurant, cafe, newsagent, and convenience store. On the corner of Tangarra Street and Coronation Parade is a chemist and other shops.

A Burwood Council works depot and the Enfield Flower Power store are located in the Enfield South neighbourhood.

== Maps ==
Google Maps - Enfield South Street and Satellite Hybrid
