= Municipality of Enfield (New South Wales) =

Former local government area in New South Wales, Australia

- Local government area
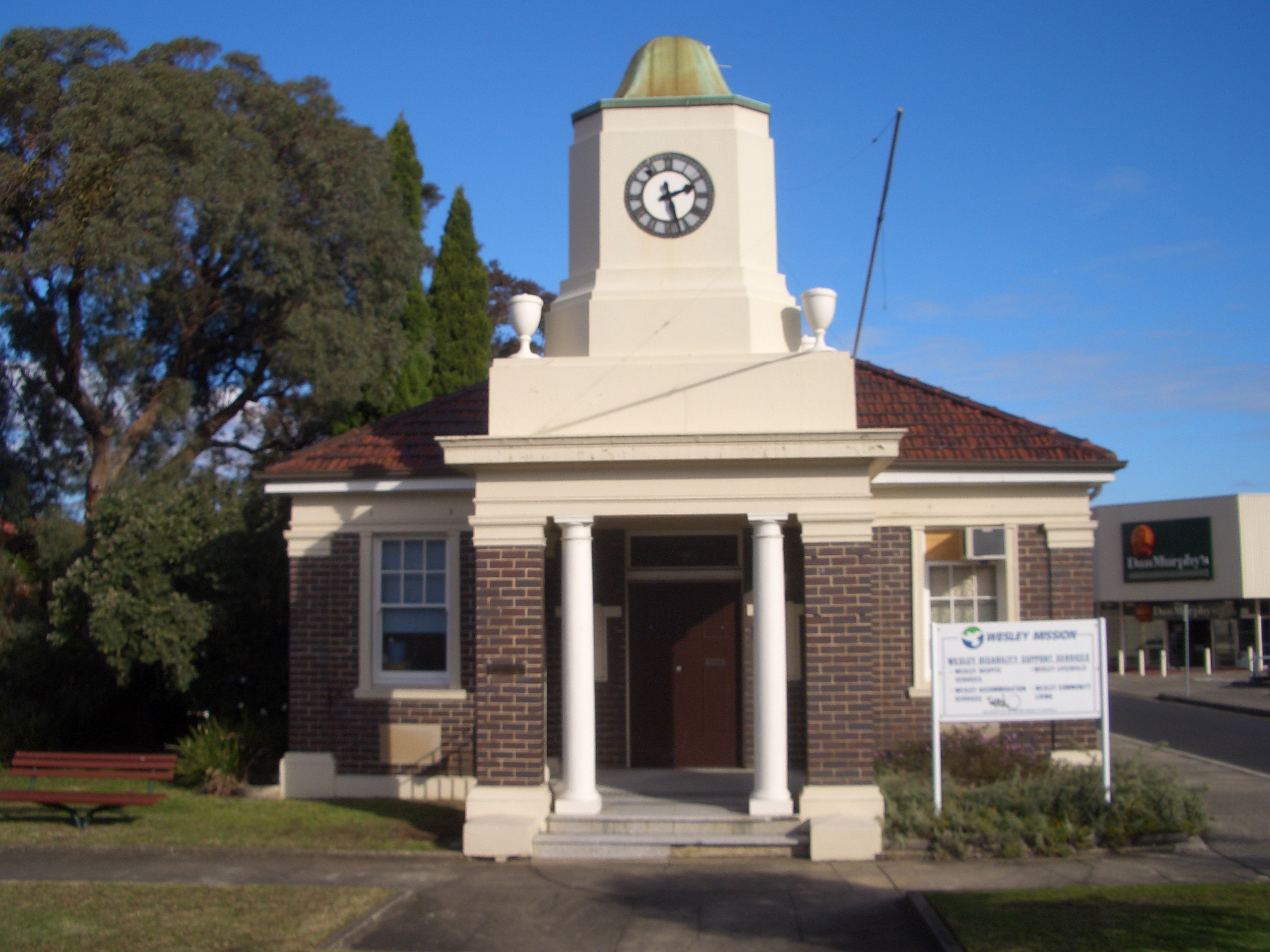
- Enfield Council Chambers, council seat from 1930 to 1948

- Country: Australia
- State: New South Wales
- Region: Inner West
- Established: 17 January 1889
- Abolished: 31 December 1948
- Council seat: Enfield Council Chambers

Area
  - Total: 3.6 km^{2} (1.4 sq mi)

Population
  - Total: 17,231 (1947 census)
  - Density: 4,790/km^{2} (12,400/sq mi)
- Parish: Concord
LGAs around Municipality of Enfield
Strathfield	Burwood
Bankstown	Municipality of Enfield	Ashfield
	Canterbury

The Municipality of Enfield was a local government area of Sydney, New South Wales, Australia. The municipality was proclaimed as the Borough of Enfield on 17 January 1889 and, with an area of 3.6 square kilometres, included the modern suburbs of Croydon, Croydon Park and Strathfield South ("Druitt Town" until 1890s), with parts of Enfield, Belfield and Greenacre included in the West Ward. In 1949, the council was split into two, with Central and East Wards being added to the Municipality of Burwood and the West Ward being added into the Municipality of Strathfield, with the passing of the Local Government (Areas) Act 1948.

== Council history and location ==
Although originally very much of a rural character, by 1888 the population of Enfield area had reached 1500 and 153 local residents submitted a petition on 22 August 1888 to the NSW Governor, Lord Carrington, requesting the formation of a municipality with the name of the "Borough of Enfield" with three wards. The petition was subsequently accepted and the Enfield Borough Council was incorporated on 22 January 1889, consisting of three wards, Central Ward, West Ward and East Ward. The first council was elected on 26 March 1889, with three aldermen elected for each ward:

Seat	Alderman	Notes
East Ward	Herman Henry Groth	Oil and colour merchant, "Bainbrigge", Badminton Road, Croydon
East Ward	Thomas Smith Richardson	Banker (Sydney Deposit Bank), Croydon Avenue, Croydon
East Ward	George Westbrook	Bandmaster, Croydon
Central Ward	James Eve	Tobacconist, Liverpool Road, Enfield
Central Ward	William Foy	Merchant, George's River Road, Enfield
Central Ward	Luke West	Engine-fitter, Minna Rose Street, Enfield
West Ward	Thomas Hodson	Freeholder, Norfolk House, Druitt Town
West Ward	Hugh Charles Reginald Cadden	Clerk, Liverpool Road, Druitt Town
West Ward	Henry George Lipscomb	Master brick-maker, Magdalene Street, Enfield

The council first met on 30 March 1889, with Alderman James Eve elected as the first mayor. Initially renting premises for the council chambers in Tennyson Parade, the council moved to a new town hall on the corner of Liverpool Road and The Parade, Enfield, in 1893. On 10 May 1889, the first town clerk was appointed, Edward A. Pyman. From 28 December 1906, following the passing of the Local Government Act, 1906, the council was renamed as the "Municipality of Enfield".

=== Later history ===
In April 1916 the Supreme Court of NSW heard an application from an Enfield ratepayer that the serving mayor, Ebenezer Ford, be removed from office. The case rested on the fact that Ford was a director of the Enfield Park Brick Company Ltd, which had recently been given a contract from the municipality. Justice David Ferguson ruled in the plaintiff's favour, with the result that Ford would be removed from office. However Ford appealed the case to the High Court and the case was overturned by a majority of the court.

In 1930 the council commissioned and completed the Enfield Council Chambers at the junction of Coronation Parade and Liverpool Road, Enfield, designed in the Inter-war stripped classical style by architects Morrow & Gordon. The foundation stone was laid on 1 March 1930 by the mayor, Stanley Lloyd, and the Minister for Local Government, Michael Bruxner.

In November 1933 the council opened the Enfield Olympic Swimming Pool in Henley Park, the first chlorinated freshwater public pool in Sydney designed by architects Rudder & Grout.

By the end of the Second World War, the NSW Government had realised that its ideas of infrastructure expansion could not be effected by the present system of the patchwork of small municipal councils across Sydney and the Minister for Local Government, Joseph Cahill, passed a bill in 1948 that abolished a significant number of those councils. Under the Local Government (Areas) Act 1948, Enfield Municipal Council was split in two, with Central and East Wards being added to the Municipality of Burwood and the West Ward being added into the Municipality of Strathfield. The new Strathfield council was divided into two wards – First Ward and Second Ward, with the Second Ward composed of three aldermen from the Enfield Council area. Former Enfield Aldermen Allan Stanley Hanson, James Clarence Morgan, and William James Weiss were elected to the Second Ward in the 1948 municipal election.

== Mayors ==
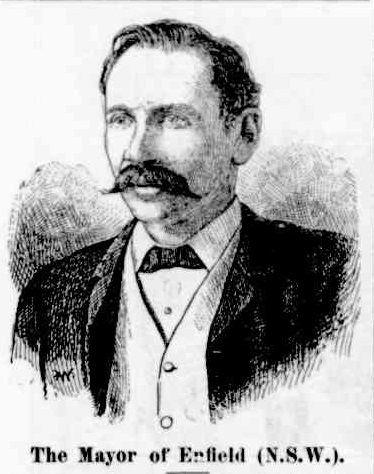
James Eve, the first mayor of Enfield, as sketched in the Australian Town and Country Journal, 18 May 1889

Stanley Lloyd, Mayor (1929–1935)

Years	Chairman	Notes
30 March 1889 – 12 February 1891	James Eve	
12 February 1891 – 6 February 1892	Thomas Hodson	
6 February 1892 – 14 February 1893	Herman Henry Groth	
14 February 1893 – 22 December 1894	George Westbrook	
22 December 1894 – 15 February 1896	Henry George Lipscomb	
15 February 1896 – 12 February 1897	George Washington Eaton	
12 February 1897 – 12 February 1903	Thomas Hodson	
12 February 1903 – 10 February 1904	Henry Chesterton Pilcher	
10 February 1904 – 11 February 1908	James MacKay	
11 February 1908 – February 1909	Albert Edward Weil	
February 1909 – February 1910	James MacKay	
February 1910 – February 1914	George Barnett Phillips	
February 1914 – 10 February 1915	Frederick Williams	
10 February 1915 – February 1917	Ebenezer Ford	
February 1917 – February 1919	Frederick Williams	
February 1919 – 1 February 1920	Adrian Burgess	
1 February 1920 – December 1929	Ebenezer Ford	
December 1929 – December 1935	Stanley Lloyd	
December 1935 – December 1937	Reuben Jenner	
December 1937 – December 1938	William Flockhart	
December 1938 – December 1939	James Mooney	
December 1939 – December 1940	James Parkes	
December 1940 – December 1946	Thomas Cooke	
December 1946 – 16 December 1947	William Sky	
16 December 1947 – 31 December 1948	Thomas Cooke	

== Town clerks ==
Years	Town clerk	Notes
30 March 1889 – 30 April 1889	A. F. Twine interim)	
30 April 1889 – 28 May 1895	Edward A. Pyman	
3 September 1895 – 31 December 1895	John Maule Hill	
31 December 1895 – April 1907	Alexander Campbell	
April 1907 – 31 December 1909	Huie N. Bowden	
1 January 1910 – June 1914	Robert George Frost	
June 1914 – 31 December 1920	Arthur J. Williamson	
1 January 1921 – 31 December 1948	Harold A. Drew	
