= Municipality of Strathfield =

- Local government area
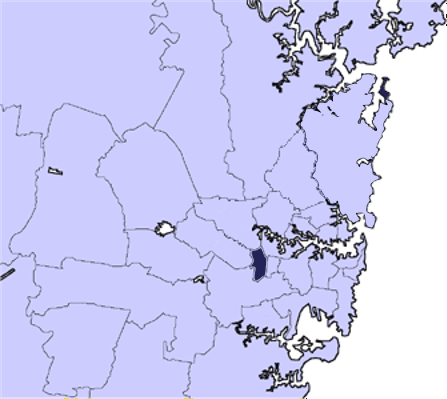
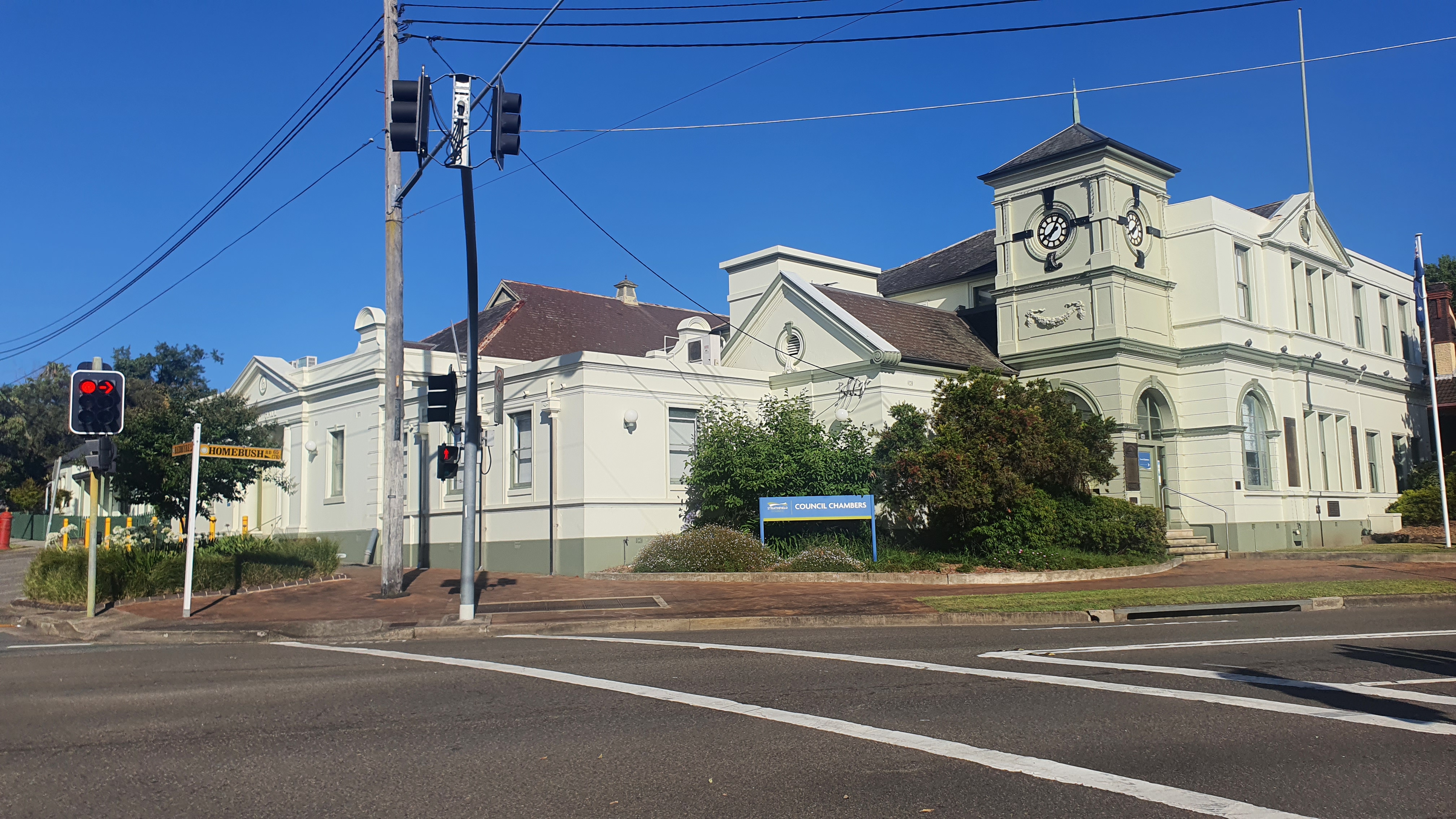
- Location in Metropolitan Sydney Strathfield Council

- Interactive map of Municipality of Strathfield
- Country: Australia
- State: New South Wales
- Region: Metropolitan Sydney
- Established: 2 June 1885
- Council seat: Strathfield

Government
  - Mayor: Benjamin Cai
  - State electorates: Strathfield; Drummoyne; Bankstown
  - Federal divisions: Reid; Watson

Area
  - Total: 14.1 km^{2} (5.4 sq mi)

Population
  - Total: 45,593 (2021 census)
  - Density: 3,234/km^{2} (8,375/sq mi)
- Website: Municipality of Strathfield
LGAs around Municipality of Strathfield
Parramatta	Canada Bay	Canada Bay
Cumberland	Municipality of Strathfield	Burwood
Canterbury Bankstown	Canterbury Bankstown	Burwood

The Municipality of Strathfield is a local government area in the Inner West of Sydney, in the state of New South Wales, Australia.

The municipality was incorporated on 2 June 1885. The council area was made up of parts of three existing localities: Redmire (in the northeast), Homebush (in the northwest) and Druitt Town (in the south). The name "Strathfield" was adopted as the name of the new council upon incorporation. In 1886, the suburb of Redmire was renamed Strathfield, as was the railway station.

The municipality today comprises an area of 14.1 square kilometres (5.4 sq mi) and as at the 2021 census had an estimated 45,593 residents. The council area is made up of residential neighbourhoods and town centres, with significant local heritage, open space, lifestyle amenities, public and private schools and access to tertiary institutions such as a campus of Australian Catholic University and the University of Sydney and TAFE Sydney Institute.

The Mayor of Strathfield Municipal Council is Benjamin Cai, an independent, who caucuses with the Liberal Party. The deputy mayor is Sandy Reddy, a member of the Liberal Party.

== Suburbs and localities in the local government area ==
The Strathfield local government area comprises:

- Flemington
- Greenacre (minor part shared with Canterbury-Bankstown)
- Homebush
- Homebush West
- Strathfield (shared with Burwood and Canada Bay)
- Strathfield South

== History ==
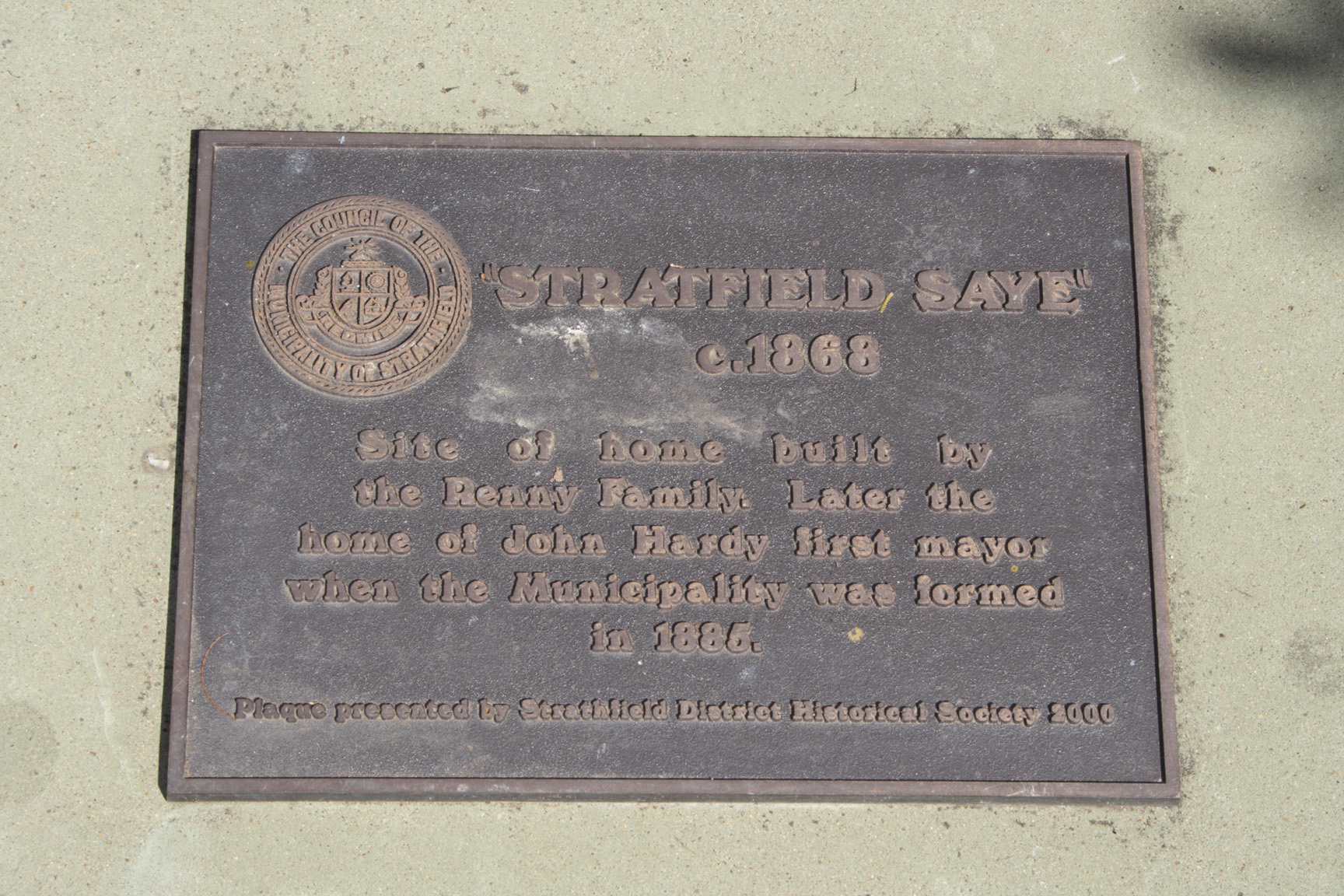
Strathfield Saye Plaque

The Municipality of Strathfield was proclaimed on 2 June 1885 by the NSW Governor, Sir Augustus Loftus. The initial boundaries included Redmire (later renamed Strathfield), the village of Homebush (the southern part of the present suburb of Homebush and the north-western part of the present-day suburb of Strathfield) and the northern part of Druitt Town (the southern part of today's suburb of Strathfield). The council was incorporated following petitions by residents of the Redmire area to form local government. This move was opposed by residents of Homebush and Druitt Town, possibly fearing the dominance of the more affluent and politically connected residents of Redmire. Despite counter petitions, the Municipality was incorporated in 1885.

Strathfield Council built the current Council Chambers in 1887. Between 1885 and 1887 the council operated from various private homes in Strathfield, pending the building of a permanent Council Chambers.

The Strathfield Council area has expanded in geography and population over time. In 1892, an area in the west of the present-day municipality was added, being the suburb of Flemington, including Flemington village in the north. As well, the part of the present-day municipality that lies south of Cook's River and north of Liverpool Road, in the south, which are now the southwestern part of the suburb of Strathfield and the northeastern part of the Greenacre. The entire Council area came to be referred to as "Strathfield" after this expansion, and the southern and western boundaries of the present-day suburb of Strathfield largely reflects the council boundaries in 1892. With the 1892 addition, Strathfield Municipality was divided into three wards: Flemington Ward in the west (covering the area incorporated in 1892, from Flemington station in the north to Liverpool Road in the south), Homebush Ward in the centre (covering the original council area west of Homebush Road, from Homebush station in the north to Liverpool Road in the south), and Strathfield Ward in the east (covering the remainder of the original council area, east of Homebush Road). The wards were abolished on 30 August 1916.

In 1947, the Municipality of Homebush was amalgamated with Strathfield. This local government area covered the part of present-day Flemington (including Flemington markets) and Homebush that lies north of the railway. The former village centres of Flemington and Homebush south of the railway were carved out of the then-suburb of Strathfield and combined with the newly incorporated area to create the present-day suburbs of Flemington, Homebush West and Homebush. In 1949, the west ward of the Municipality of Enfield was added to Strathfield, with the eastern part going to the Municipality of Burwood. This added the present-day suburbs of Strathfield South, eastern part of Greenacre, and northern part of Belfield. At the time of this expansion, the council was divided into two wards: first ward (Strathfield and Homebush) and second ward (Enfield). These wards were abolished in 1953.

In 1992, a section of the northern part of the Municipality, between the A3 road and Boundary Creek, was transferred to the then Auburn Council to become part of the site of Sydney Olympic Park. In return, the area of and between Boundary Creek and the railway line, occupied by the former Ford factory building, was transferred from Auburn to Strathfield Council.

In 2021, a proposal was submitted to the Geographical Names Board, to separate the northern part of Belfield which was within the Municipality of Strathfield (north of Punchbowl Road) from the southern part within the City of Canterbury-Bankstown. Under this proposal, northern Belfield would form part of Strathfield South, from which it was separated by the Cooks River. This was approved in 2023.

The municipality now includes the suburbs of Strathfield, Flemington, Homebush, Homebush West, Strathfield South, and a minor part of Greenacre.

=== Recent council amalgamation proposals ===
Throughout its history, there have been movements to amalgamate local councils in the Sydney area: the first major 'threat' was with the 'royal commission for a greater Sydney (1913)', known as 'The Greater Sydney Movement'. The Royal Commission brought together Sidney Webb, a British politician and John Fitzgerald, an Australian politician, who, amongst others, believed that Sydney should be merged into a single local government area. In 1947 Homebush and Strathfield councils merged and part of Enfield was added in 1949.

A 2015 review of local government boundaries by the NSW Government Independent Pricing and Regulatory Tribunal recommended that the Strathfield Municipal Council merge with adjoining councils. The government proposed a merger of the Burwood, Canada Bay, and Strathfield Councils to form a new council with an area of 41 square kilometres (16 sq mi) and support a population of approximately 163,000. On 6 May Strathfield Council commenced legal action in the NSW Land and Environment Court against the proposed amalgamation. After the Court heard that there were legal flaws in the report from the NSW Government appointed delegate who examined the proposal for merging the councils, the NSW Government withdrew from the case and the merger proposal stalled. In July 2017, the Berejiklian government decided to abandon the forced merger of the Strathfield, Burwood and Canada Bay local government areas, along with several other proposed forced mergers.

== Geography ==
The Strathfield Council area is located at 33°52'10" South, 151°5'59" East (-33.8717, 151.0899). It covers a total area of approximately 14.1 square kilometres (5.4 sq mi) and includes the suburbs of Strathfield, Strathfield South, Homebush, Homebush West, Flemington and parts of Greenacre. Homebush Bay Drive bounds Strathfield Council to the north, Powells Creek, The Boulevarde and Coronation Parade bounds it to the east, Punchbowl Road and Juno Parade form the southern border and Roberts Road, Chullora rail yards, Rookwood Cemetery and the Sydney Olympic Park Rail line bound the Municipality to the west.

Similarly to other parts of the Inner West, the geography of the Municipality of Strathfield is characterised by the catchments of the Parramatta River to the north, and the Cooks River to the south. Smaller creeks flow towards these two rivers through the municipality, although most of them are now canalised. The two largest are Powells Creek and Saleyards Creek, which join and eventually flow to the Parramatta River. The Cooks River itself is a minor waterway as it flows through the municipality, and is canalised in the eastern part of the municipality. In this area, the Hume Highway, which runs through the south of the municipality, approximates the ridgeline between the two catchments.

== Council ==
=== Current composition and election method ===
Strathfield Municipal Council is composed of seven councillors elected proportionally as one entire ward. All councillors are elected for a fixed four-year term of office. The mayor and deputy mayor are elected bi-annually by the councillors at the first meeting of the council. The most recent election was held on 14 September 2024, and the makeup of the council is as follows:

Party	Councillors
Liberal Party	3
Labor Party	2
Strathfield Independents	1
Independent	1
Total	7

The current Council, elected in 2024, in order of election, is:

Councillor	Party	Notes
Benjamin Cai	Independent	Elected 2021; Mayor 2025–current
Matthew Blackmore	Strathfield First	Elected 2016; Deputy Mayor 2018–2020; 2023, Mayor 2022–2023
John-Paul Baladi	Liberal Party	Elected 2024; Mayor 2024–2025
Rory Nosworthy	Labor Party	Elected 2024
Sandy Reddy	Liberal Party	Elected 2021; Deputy Mayor 2023–2024 and 2025-current
Karen Pensabene	Labor Party (Suspended)	Elected 2016; Deputy Mayor 2020–2023, Mayor 2023–2024
Esther Kim	Liberal Party	Elected 2024

== Election results ==
=== 2024 ===
2024 New South Wales local elections: Strathfield
Party	Candidate	Votes	%	±%
Liberal	1. John-Paul Baladi (elected 3); 2. Sandy Reddy (elected 5); 3. Hye Young (Esther) Kim (elected 7); 4. Satvik Sharma	6,912	35.11	+35.11
Labor	1. Rory Nosworthy (elected 4); 2. Karen Pensabene (elected 6); 3. Raj Datta; 4. Elizabeth Wang; 5. Joshua Kolesnikoff; 6. Steven Du; 7. Anne Sullivan	6,107	31.02	−11.78
Strathfield Independents	1. Matthew Blackmore (elected 2); 2. Dong (Robin) Ma; 3. Andrew Soulos; 4. Anna Edwards; 5. Adam Smith; 6. Dale Brett Ford; 7. Helen Apostle	3,401	17.28	−3.82
Benjamin Cai & Nella Hall Independent Group	1. Benjamin Cai (elected 1); 2. Nella Hall; 3. Yakub Can; 4. Patricia Giammarco; 5. Chi Zhang; 6. Sabitri Kafle	2,980	15.14	−16.96 (Note: Compared to the Benjamin Cai Independent Team (BCIT) vote total at the 2021 election, Compared to the BCIT and NHI combined 2021 vote total, BCIT has a decrease of 16.96%.)
Independent	Sarath Pamidiparthi	261	1.33	+1.33
Independent	Mario Orlovic	26	0.13	+0.13
Total formal votes		19,687	94.85	
Informal votes		1,067	5.15	
Turnout		20,754		

== Demographics ==
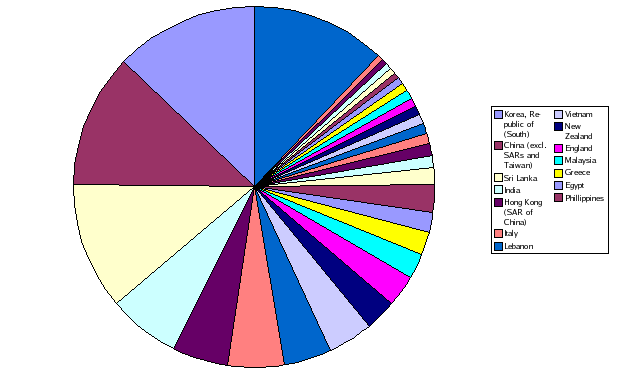
Overseas-born birthplaces based on 2001 Australian Census data for the Strathfield local government area.

At the 2021 census there were 45,593 people in the Strathfield local government area, of which 51.2% were male and 48.8% were female. Aboriginal and Torres Strait Islander people made up 0.4 per cent of the population; significantly below the NSW and Australian averages of 3.4 and 3.2 per cent respectively. The median age of people in the Strathfield local government area was 33 years; significantly lower than the national median of 38 years. Children aged 0 – 14 years made up 14.9 per cent of the population and people aged 65 years and over made up 12.0 per cent of the population. Of people in the area aged 15 years and over, 48.9 per cent were married and 8.0 per cent were either divorced or separated. The largest group of residents in the Strathfield municipality by reported ancestry is Chinese.

The Strathfield local government area has experienced significant population growth over the last two decades. The population of Strathfield at the 2001 census was only 27,777. The population grew by 15.14 per cent between the 2001 census and the 2006 census; 10.02 per cent in the subsequent five years to the 2011 census; 14.56 per cent in the five years to the 2016 census; and 13.1 per cent in the subsequent five years to the 2021 census. The population has almost exactly doubled since 2001. This is significantly higher than the national average growth of 35.4% over the same period.

In 2021, the median household weekly income for residents within the Municipality of Strathfield was 21% higher than the national average.

Historical census data for Strathfield local government area
Census year		2001	2006	2011	2016	2021
Population	Estimated residents on census night	27,777	▲31,983	▲35,188	▲40,312	▲45,593
Population	LGA rank in terms of size within New South Wales			55th	▲53rd	▲50th
Population	% of New South Wales population		0.51%	▲0.54%	▲0.54%	▲0.56%
Population	% of Australian population	0.15%	▲0.16%	0.16%	▲0.17%	▲0.18%
Cultural and language diversity						
Ancestry, top responses				(% response)	(% response)	(% population)
Ancestry, top responses	Chinese			17.3%	▲17.8%	21.4%
Ancestry, top responses	Indian			8.0%	▲11.1%	11.0%
Ancestry, top responses	English			7.8%	▼7.7%	8.9%
Ancestry, top responses	Australian			9.2%	7.5%	8.2%
Ancestry, top responses	Nepalese			--	--	6.9%
Ancestry, top responses	South Korean			7.5%	▲7.9%	6.9%
Language, top responses (other than English)	Mandarin	4.2%	▲6.4%	▲8.0%	▲10.0%	▲10.3%
Language, top responses (other than English)	Nepali	--	--	--	--	▲6.7%
Language, top responses (other than English)	Cantonese	8.7%	▼8.4%	▼8.0%	▼7.0%	▼6.6%
Language, top responses (other than English)	Korean	7.0%	▲8.4%	▲8.9%	▼8.8%	▼6.3%
Language, top responses (other than English)	Arabic	5.8%	5.8%	▼5.7%	▼5.0%	▲5.1%
Language, top responses (other than English)	Tamil	6.4%	▼5.8%	▼5.3%	▲5.6%	▼ --
Religious affiliation						
Religious affiliation, top responses	No religion, so described	10.2%	▲12.3%	▲15.0%	▲21.6%	▲24.0%
Religious affiliation, top responses	Catholic	34.0%	▼30.7%	▼27.5%	▼23.0%	▼20.8%
Religious affiliation, top responses	Hinduism	9.0%	▲10.3%	▲13.2%	▲16.4%	▲19.8%
Religious affiliation, top responses	Islam	--	--	--	--	6.4%
Religious affiliation, top responses	Not stated	n/c	n/c	n/c	9.3%	6.2%
Religious affiliation, top responses	Buddhism	n/c	▲6.4%	▲6.8%	▼5.7%	▼ --
Median weekly incomes						
Personal income	Median weekly personal income		A$458	A$558	A$682	A$869
Personal income	% of Australian median income		98.3%	96.7%	103.0%	108.0%
Family income	Median weekly family income		A$1,256	A$1,595	A$1,894	A$2,301
Family income	% of Australian median income		106.4%	107.7%	109.2%	108.5%
Household income	Median weekly household income		A$1,256	A$1,421	A$1,781	A$2,105
Household income	% of Australian median income		107.3%	115.2%	123.9%	120.6%

== Heritage listings ==
The Municipality of Strathfield has a number of heritage-listed sites, including:

- Homebush, Great Southern and Western railway: Homebush railway station
- South Strathfield, St Anne's Square: St Anne's Roman Catholic Church, South Strathfield
- Strathfield, Great Southern and Western railway: Strathfield rail underbridges
- Strathfield, Great Southern and Western railway: Strathfield railway station

== Council facilities ==
The council operates a main library located on Rochester Street in Homebush. The library was demolished in 2002 and a new library was built and opened in 2004.

Historically, the municipality's main library was located on Parramatta Road in Homebush, inherited from the former Homebush Municipality (which governed the northern part of the modern suburb of Homebush) after it merged into Strathfield in 1947. The Parramatta Road library served as the municipality's main library until 1967, when the High Street library became the main library, and the Parramatta Road library was closed in 1976 after the Rochester Street library was opened.

The council formerly operated a branch library on High Street in Strathfield South, which was rebuilt and opened in 2008. However, the branch library was closed in 2019 and converted into a community centre, with some book lockers to continue some library services from this location.

The municipality's main community centre, the Strathfield Community Centre, is located at 1B Bates Street, Homebush, in Airey Park.

The former South Strathfield Bowling Club was bought by Strathfield Council and renovated with a grant of $495,00 from the Department of Aging, Disability and Home Care. The building was opened as a community centre on 3 December 2012 and named in honour of Eve Dutton who was the first female mayor of Strathfield. This community centre gives priority access to services and programs for aged and disability groups. It houses Strathfield/Homebush Meals on Wheels and Inner West Community Transport.

== Culture ==
The population of Strathfield is made up of a number of ethnic groups, and about 48% of the population born overseas. As a result, there are a number of services for newly arrived immigrants and overseas students who live in the area. Two such organisations are the Russian Ethnic Community Council of NSW Inc (RECNSW), and the Sydney Tamil Resource Centre Inc (STRC). RECNSW provides access to information and referral to mainstream services to recent immigrants of Russian and Russian speaking background and disseminates information to remote and offshore areas on a number of issues. STRC provides resources to Tamil immigrants. A number of the commercial centres in the Municipality of Strathfield feature concentrations of restaurants and shops with ethnically distinct character, such as the concentration of Korean restaurants and shops in the Strathfield town centre, and Chinese and Vietnamese restaurants and shops in the Flemington village centre. The Homebush village centre features cafes and restaurants serving a variety of cuisines (such as Chinese, Korean, Indian, Greek and Lebanese).

Strathfield also has a number of community centres, including a Rotary club, Latvian theatre, Lantern Club, and libraries. The local Rotary club provides support to the community and has a number of projects in the area, as well as a Musical Society (part of Rotary?), which normally produces two shows a year in the Latvian Theatre in Strathfield. Their main social activity is rehearsing twice weekly and they present seven performances of their musical production over two weekends. Strathfield Lantern Club Voluntary is located in Strathfield and provides fundraising organisation for raising funds specifically for the Royal Institute for Deaf and Blind Children in North Rocks.

Woodward Road in Strathfield has erroneously been declared the location or setting of the song Murder City Nights, written by the Australian punk rock band Radio Birdman. In fact the song references Woodward Avenue in Detroit, Michigan, which runs from downtown Detroit up to midtown Detroit parallel with Cass Avenue, the two main roads leading from downtown Detroit up to midtown. The song was titled Murder City Nights because Detroit has typically been nicknamed the Motor City and then later ‘Murder City’ when crime spiked out of control throughout Metropolitan Detroit after the automotive boom faded.

== State and Federal government ==
In the NSW Legislative Assembly, the Municipality of Strathfield mostly falls into the electorate of Strathfield, except the part of the suburb of Greenacre within council boundaries, which is in the electorate of Bankstown, and the northern part of Homebush (north of Parramatta Road) is in the electorate of Drummoyne.

For Federal elections it is in the electorates of Reid (north of Hume Highway) and Watson (south of Hume Highway).

== See also ==
- Local government areas of New South Wales
