= St Anne's Roman Catholic Church, Strathfield South =

St Anne's Church, Strathfield South
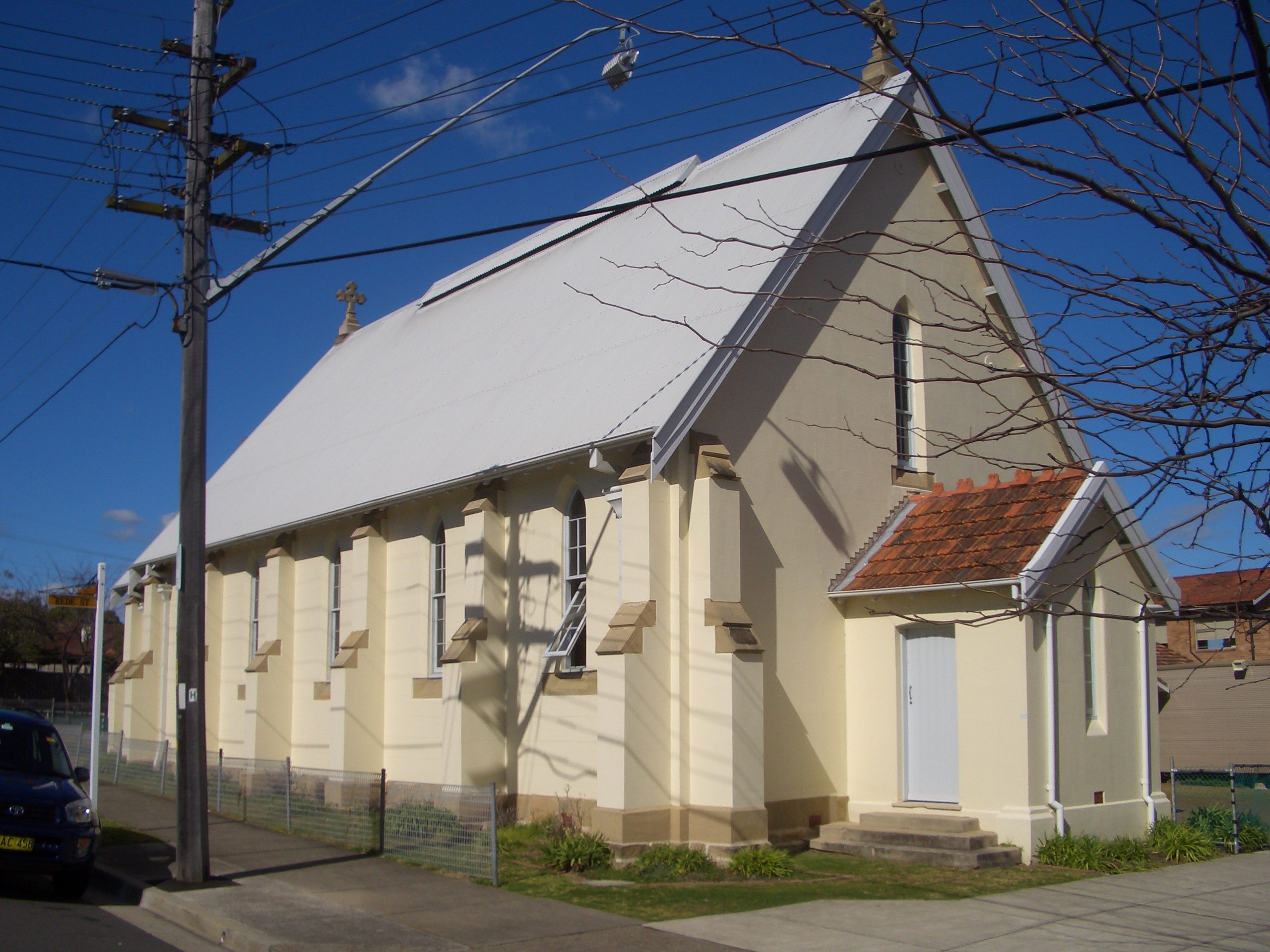
- St Anne's Roman Catholic Church, Strathfield South

- Location of St Anne's Church, Strathfield South, in Greater Sydney.
- 33°53′32″S 151°04′41″E
- Location: 11 St Annes Square, Strathfield South, New South Wales, Australia
- Country: Australia
- Denomination: Roman Catholic

History
- Status: Church
- Founded: 2 July 1841
- Founder: Fr. John Joseph Therry

Architecture
- Functional status: Active
- Years built: 1859–1864

Administration
- Archdiocese: Sydney

New South Wales Heritage Register
- Official name: St. Anne's Roman Catholic Church (former); St Anne's Catholic Church
- Type: State heritage (built)
- Designated: 2 April 1999
- Reference no.: 508
- Type: Church
- Category: Religion

St Anne's Roman Catholic Church is a heritage-listed Roman Catholic school and church building located at St Annes Square, Strathfield South in the Municipality of Strathfield local government area in Sydney, Australia. It was built from 1859 to 1864. It is also known as St. Anne's Roman Catholic Church (former) and St Anne's Catholic Church. It was added to the New South Wales State Heritage Register on 2 April 1999.

== History ==
The church is significant primarily because of its strong associations with the important figure archpriest John Joseph Therry (1790–1864), co-founder of the Roman Catholic Church in Australia; champion of the rights of Irish immigrants and convicts; and patron of several church building projects in New South Wales and Tasmania.

The building derives considerable significance from its location in a village square conceived by Therry in 1837, which, although never fully realised, retains a townscape significance value not found elsewhere in New South Wales.

The modest character of the building reflects the needs and requirements of the time and the restrictions imposed by finances and the use of local building materials and techniques.

The church stands in the village square, conceived by Archpriest John Joseph Therry in 1837, the original foundation stone laid on 2 July 1841.

The church was built between 1859 and 1864 and the subdivision streets were named for prominent ecclesiastics of the time.

== Description ==
Located in the north east corner of the square (the centre being subject to clay deposits) it is typical of an Irish village church with additions, such as the vestry with fireplace. Built of solid brick (cement rendered in 1952) with sandstone footing course. Dressed sills and cappings to the buttresses. The brick interior is painted to the dado level. The sanctuary is plastered with interesting stencil work. The rest of the square is now occupied by the new church, primary school and car park.

The Church was cement rendered in 1952.

== Heritage listing ==
St Anne's Roman Catholic Church was listed on the New South Wales State Heritage Register on 2 April 1999.

== See also ==
- Roman Catholicism in Australia
