= Bob Norton =

Australian orthodontist (1922–1992)

Bob Norton OBE
- Born: 15 August 1922; Sydney
- Died: 23 December 1992; Sydney
- Education: Newington College; University of Sydney
- Occupation: Dental surgeon
- Spouse(s): Betty, née Kennedy (1947)
- Children: One daughter, one son
- Parent(s): Mr and Mrs C Norton

Robert Cecil York Norton (15 August 1922 – 23 December 1992) was an Australian dental surgeon and specialist orthodontist. He served as president of the Royal Australasian College of Dental Surgeons and chairman of the Dental Board of New South Wales. In the year that he died he was elected as vice-president of the International College of Dentists.

== Early life and education ==
Bob Norton was born in Sydney, and his early education was at Croydon Preparatory School. He attended Newington College (1933–1940) from his family home in Enfield, New South Wales, and excelled in cricket. He was a member of the Newington 1st XI (1938–1940) and selected in the Combined GPS XI in 1939 and again in 1940. After completing the Leaving Certificate, Norton went up to the University of Sydney in 1941 and he graduated as a Bachelor of Dental Surgery in 1946 and a Master of Dental Surgery in 1947. Whilst at university he received a Blue for both cricket and baseball.

== Dental career ==
After post-graduate study in the USA, Norton returned to Sydney to specialise in orthodontistry. He also provided specialist services on a visiting basis in Goulburn and Wagga Wagga.

== Honours ==
In 1977, Norton was made an Officer of the Order of the British Empire (Civil) for service to dentistry. The Fédération Dentaire Internationale bestowed the Award of Merit upon Norton in 1980. He was a Fellow of the Royal Australasian College of Dental Surgeons and an Honorary Life Member of the Australian Dental Association, Korean Dental Association, Taiwan Dental Association, American Dental Association and Australian Society of Orthodontists.
