= Strathfield South =

- Suburb
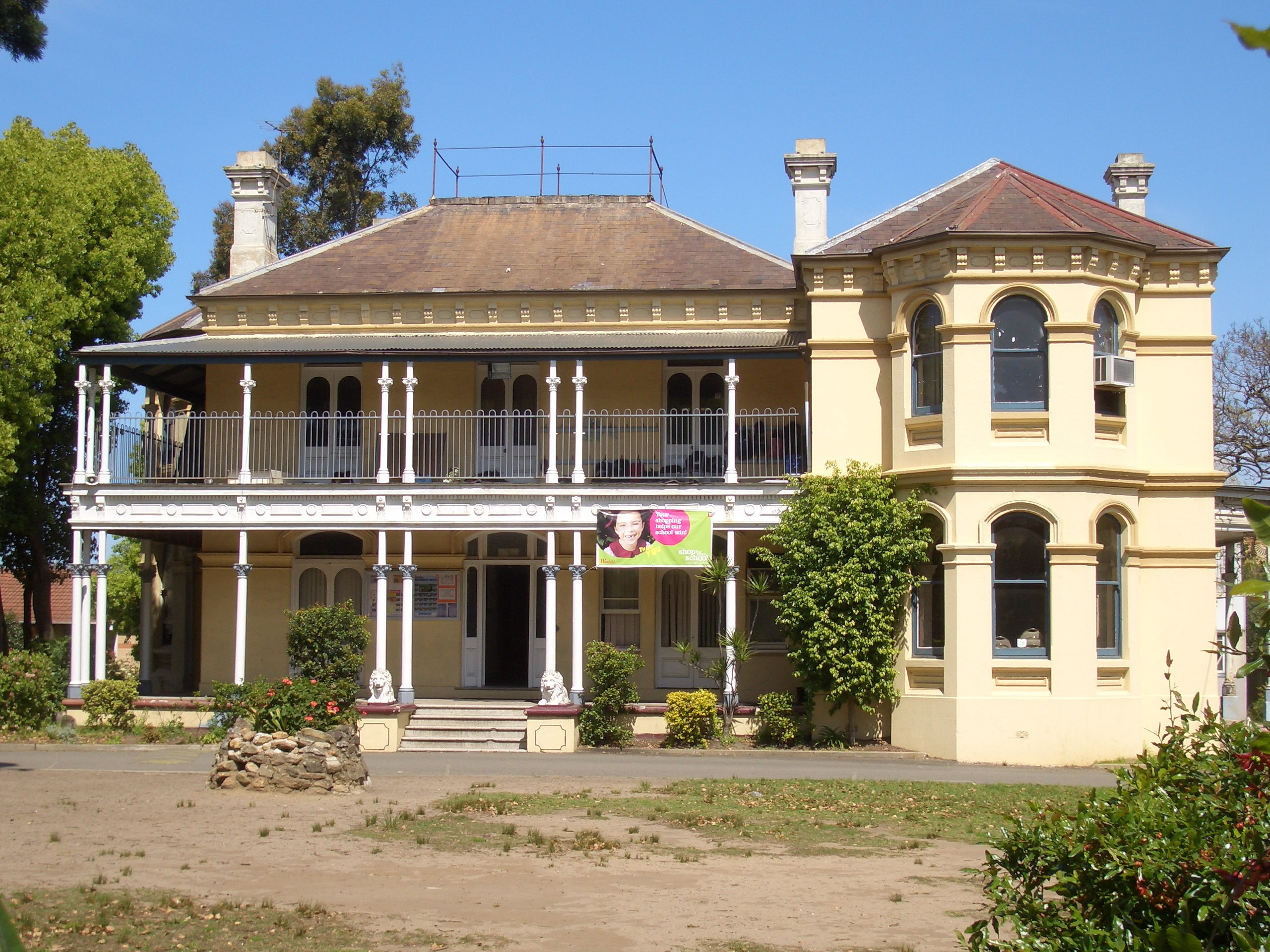
- Brundah, a Victorian style house on the former Leigh College Campus

- Interactive map of Strathfield South
- Coordinates: 33°53′22″S 151°04′59″E
- Country: Australia
- State: New South Wales
- City: Sydney
- LGA: Strathfield Council
- Location: 13 km (8.1 mi) west of Sydney CBD

Government
  - State electorate: Strathfield
  - Federal division: Watson
- Elevation: 15 m (49 ft)

Population
  - Total: 3,636 (2021 census)
- Postcode: 2136
Suburbs around Strathfield South
Rookwood	Strathfield	Burwood Heights
Greenacre	Strathfield South	Enfield
Lakemba	Belfield	Enfield

Strathfield South is a suburb, in the Inner West of Sydney, Australia in the state of New South Wales, 13 kilometres west of the Sydney central business district, in the Strathfield local government area. The area was historically part of Druitt Town. Later it was part of Enfield, until Enfield Council was absorbed into Strathfield and Burwood councils, after which the part within Strathfield council was renamed Strathfield South.

North Strathfield and Strathfield are separate suburbs, to the north. Strathfield South is located between Liverpool Road (Hume Highway) and the Cooks River, bordered on the east by Coronation Parade and to the west by the Enfield Marshalling Yards.

== History ==
Most of Strathfield South is located on two early land grants – the 1808 grant to James Wilshire (later known as the Redmire Estate) and the 1837 grant to Father John Joseph Therry, which became the Village of St Anne's.

Wilshire's grant was subdivided in 1867 and marketed as the 'Redmire Estate'. Roads in Strathfield South such as Dean Street and Water Street were established in this subdivision. A few early Victorian and Federation style homes survive from this early period of development.

Father John Joseph Therry was granted 19 hectares (47 acres) in March 1837. To finance the building of the original St. Anne's Church (foundation stone laid July 1841) Father Therry offered 1.6-hectare (4-acre) blocks for £25, but insufficient money being available, a further 134 allotments were offered for sale in 1854 and the streets of the subdivision named after Saints or dignitaries of the Church. St Anne's Church is listed on the New South Wales State Heritage Register.

The area around St Anne's Village and to the west of Cooks River was locally known as Bark Huts. Bark Huts was a hotel on Liverpool Road, halfway between Sydney and Liverpool, and a small settlement was established around the hotel.

The Village of St Anne's and the southern part of the Redmire Estate became known as Druitt Town. This name was given to the area by Joshua Judge Josephson, who owned large areas of land in the area, in honour of his friend Major George Druitt. Druitt Town Public School opened in 1881. In 1885, the part of Druitt Town north of Liverpool Road (including the school) became part of the newly incorporated Strathfield Council, after which addressed in that part of Druitt Town became listed under "Strathfield" in directories. This area is now the southern part of the suburb of Strathfield. Druitt Town public school was renamed Strathfield South Public School.

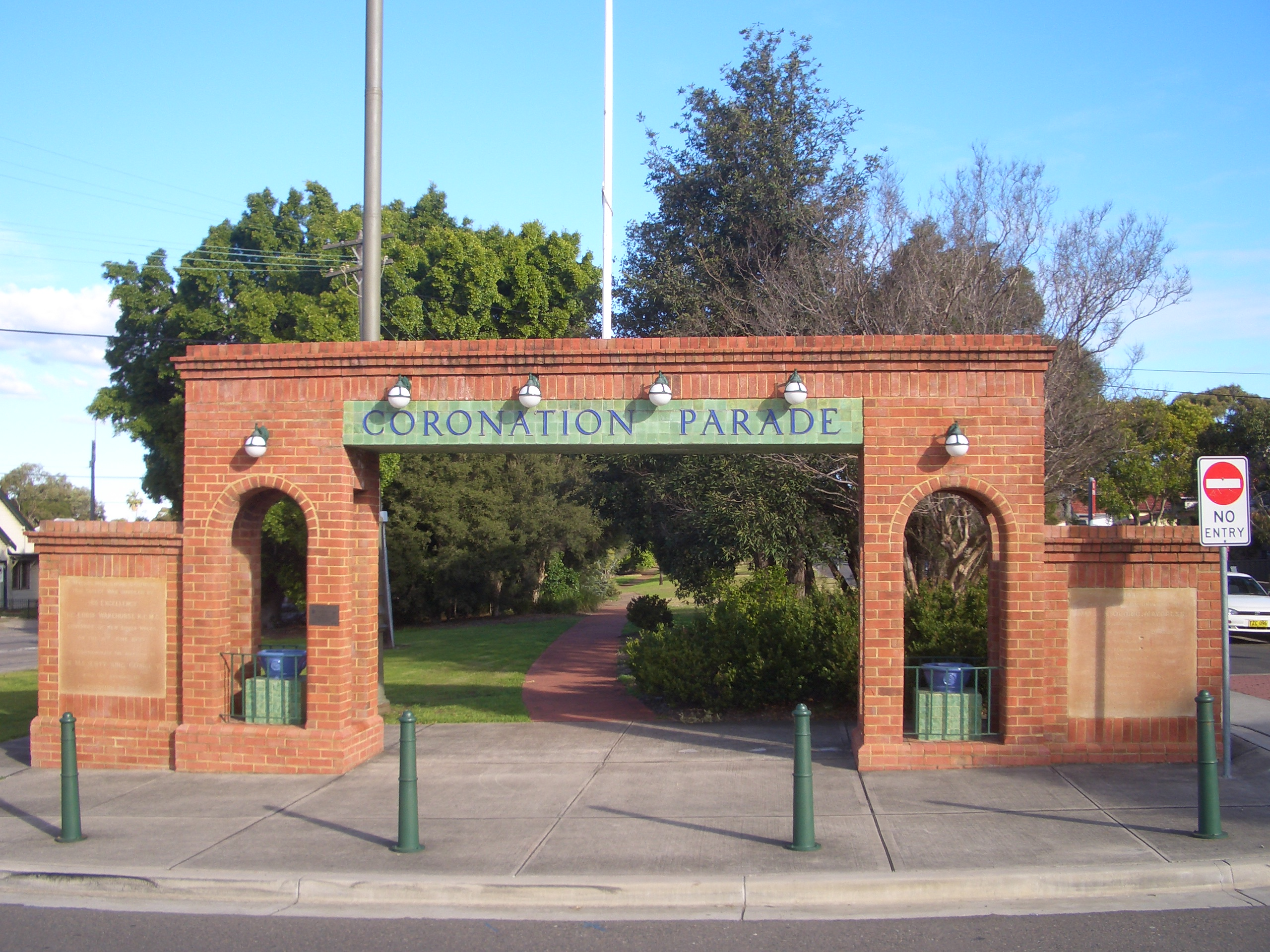
The Coronation Parade Arch, built in 1937 and now on the boundary between Enfield and Strathfield South, displays 4 light bulbs in sockets which were originally the holders for the four electricity cables that ran along the former tram line

The remaining part of Druitt Town became part of Enfield Municipal Council in 1889, shortly after which "Druitt Town" ceased to be used: addresses in the suburb instead became listed under the suburb of Enfield. The Druitt Town post office was moved to Enfield. The area was reincorporated into Strathfield Municipality in 1949, after which Strathfield Council renamed the part of former Enfield Municipality between Liverpool Road and the Cooks River as "Strathfield South". Former Enfield Town Hall and the associated war memorial are now located in Strathfield South. Coronation Reserve forms the border between Strathfield South and the suburb of Enfield, and was formerly the site of a tram line that led north to Burwood and Abbotsford and south to Croydon Park and then to Ashfield.

In 2021, a proposal was submitted to the Geographical Names Board, to separate the northern part of Belfield which was within the Municipality of Strathfield (north of Punchbowl Road) from the southern part within the City of Canterbury-Bankstown. Under this proposal, northern Belfield would form part of Strathfield South, from which it was separated by the Cooks River. This was approved in 2023.

== Heritage listings ==
South Strathfield has a number of heritage-listed sites, including:

- St Anne's Square: St Anne's Roman Catholic Church, South Strathfield

== Population ==
In the 2021 Census, there were 3,636 people in Strathfield South. 50.1% of people were born in Australia. The next most common countries of birth were China 7.5%, India 6.2%, Sri Lanka 4.3%, South Korea 3.9% and Italy 2.2%. 40.0% of people spoke only English at home. Other languages spoken at home included Mandarin 7.2%, Cantonese 6.5%, Arabic 5.6%, Tamil 5.4% and Korean 5.2%. The most common responses for religion were Catholic 30.5%, No Religion 21.0% and Hinduism 10.7%.

== Commercial area, schools, churches and parklands ==
South is primarily low-rise residential with a small group of shops located around the intersection of Liverpool Road and Homebush Road. The first high-rise development has now been built on the Hume Highway. The part of the suburb west and south of the Cooks River is entirely industrial, and includes the large Enfield Intermodal Logistics Centre. The industrial part of the suburb is separated from the residential suburb by the Cooks River and parklands.

The Catholic parish of St Anne's is located in St Anne's Square. Strathfield South Uniting Church is in Liverpool Road.

St Anne's Catholic Primary School is located in Strathfield South. The suburb is also serviced by two other schools located outside the suburb: Strathfield South Public School and Strathfield South High School. Founded as Druitt Town Public School, Strathfield South Public School is the public primary (grades K–6) school which services the area formerly known as Druitt Town: now Strathfield South and the southern part of the suburb of Strathfield. With over 125 years of history, the motto of Strathfield South Public School is Think of Others. Strathfield South High School is the public secondary (grades 7–12) school, whose catchment includes Strathfield South, the southern part of Strathfield, as well as the northern part of Greenacre and Belfield. Neither school is in Strathfield South itself: both are situated on the southern edge of the suburb of Strathfield.

Leigh College was from 1915 until 1974 a Methodist Theological College located at 416–420 Liverpool Road. It was the successor to the Wesleyan Theological Institution. The site is now used by the Australian International Academy, an Islamic school.

The area is well serviced by parks such as Ford Park, Dean Reserve and St Anne's Reserve, which runs along the Cooks River. The Bay to Bay Cycle/Walking Path, which runs between Botany Bay and Homebush Bay (Sydney Olympic Park) runs through Strathfield South, along the Cooks River.

== Gallery ==
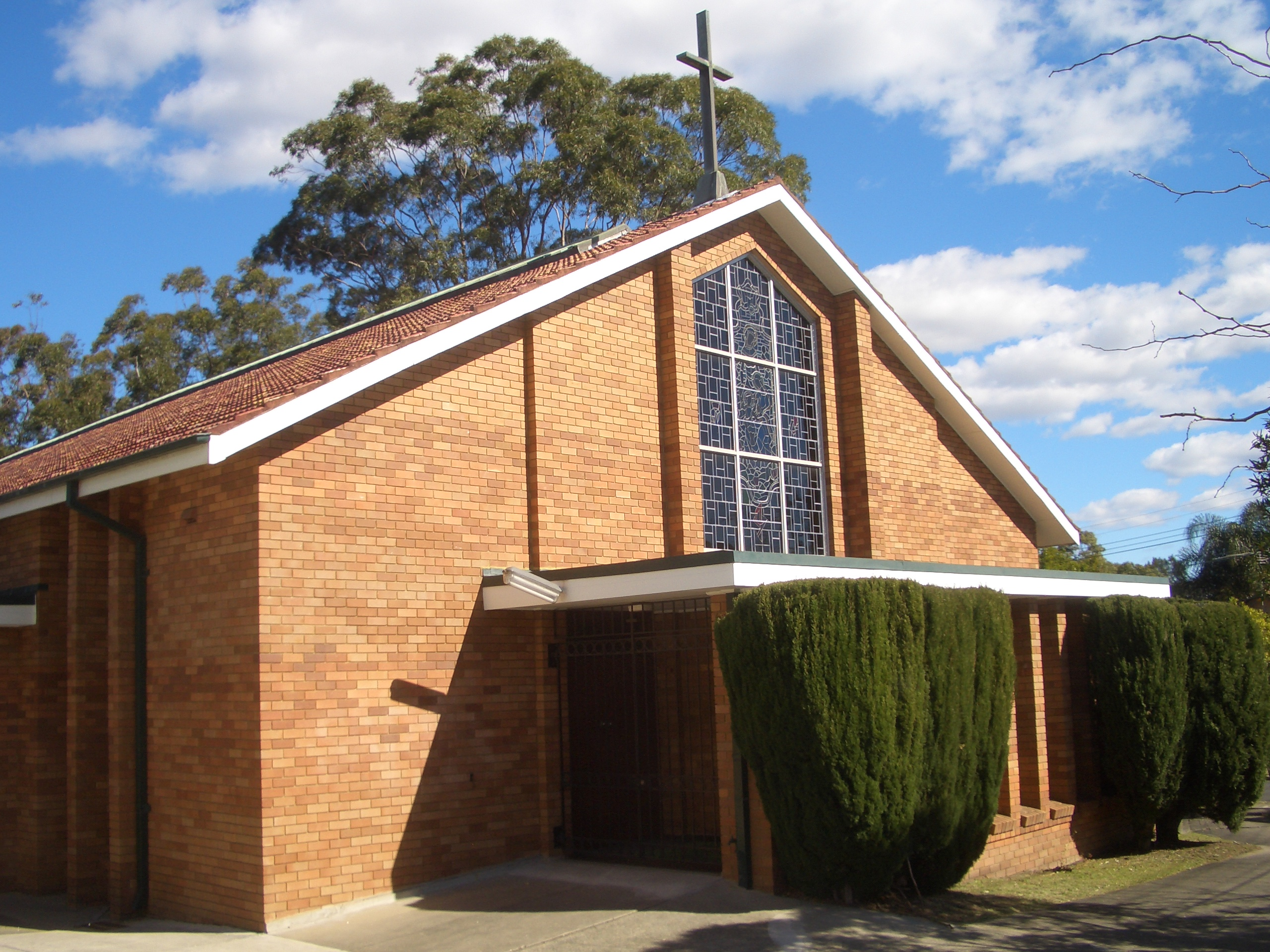
St Anne's Catholic Church

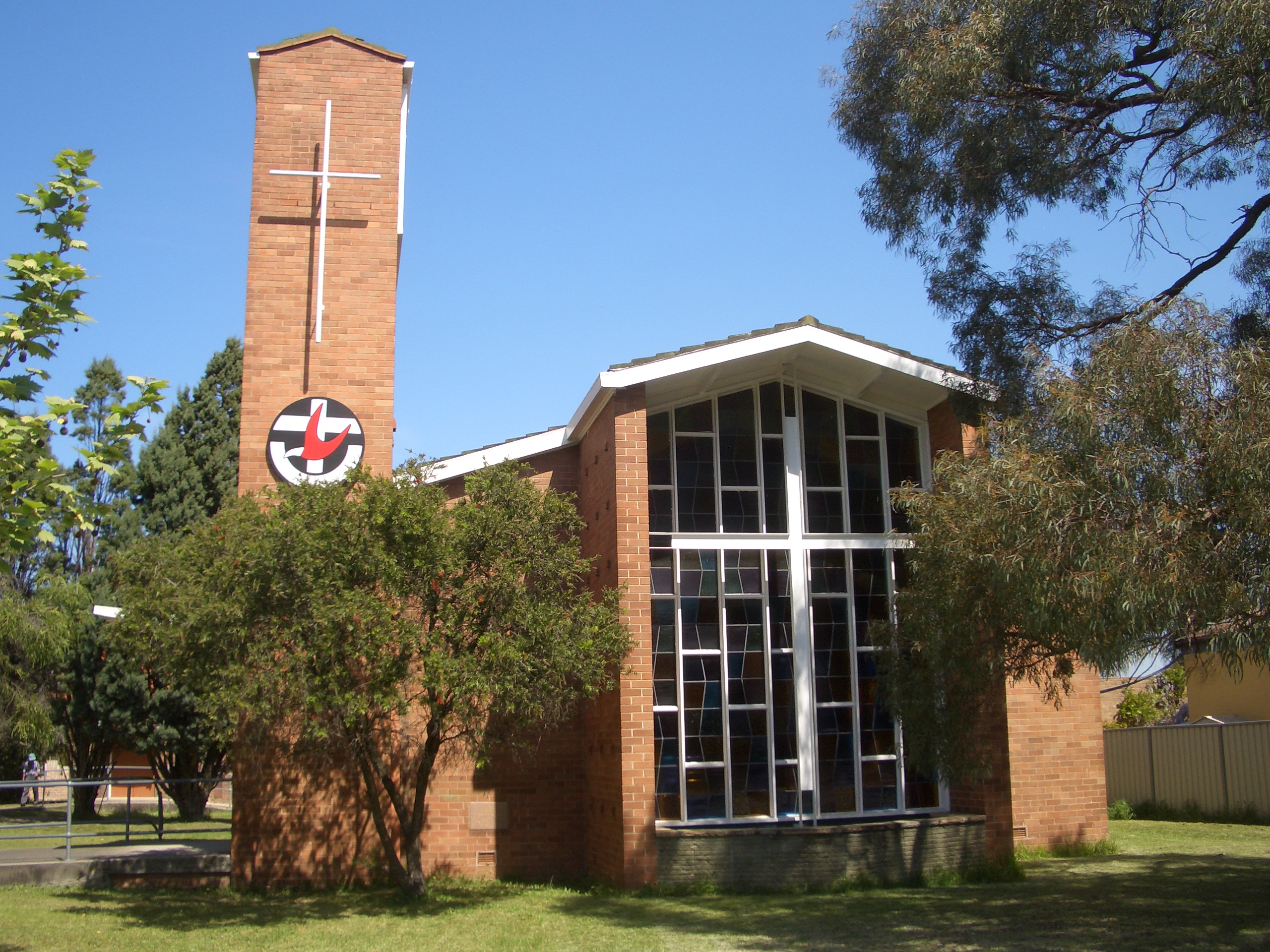
Strathfield South Uniting Church

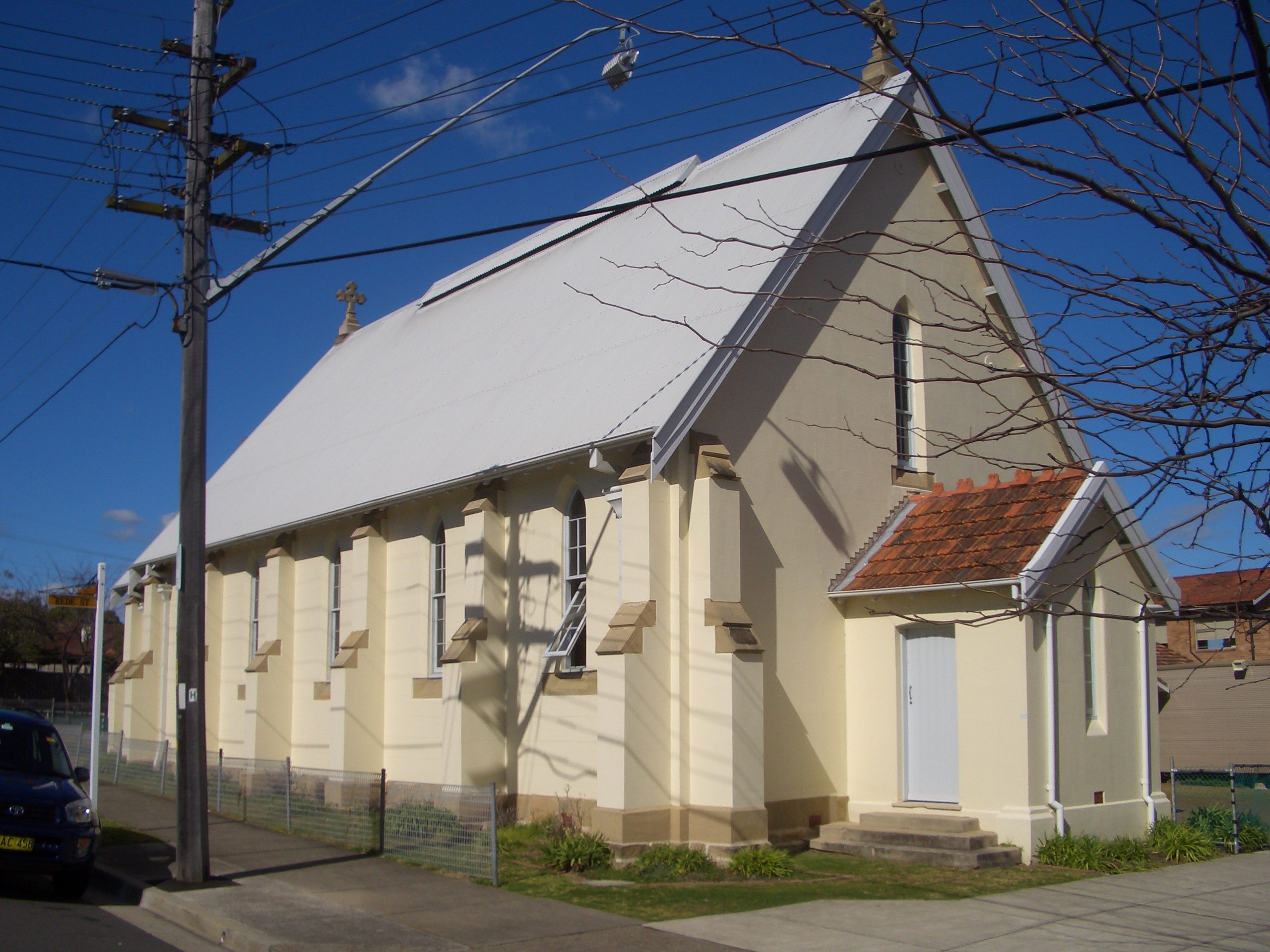
St Anne's Hall

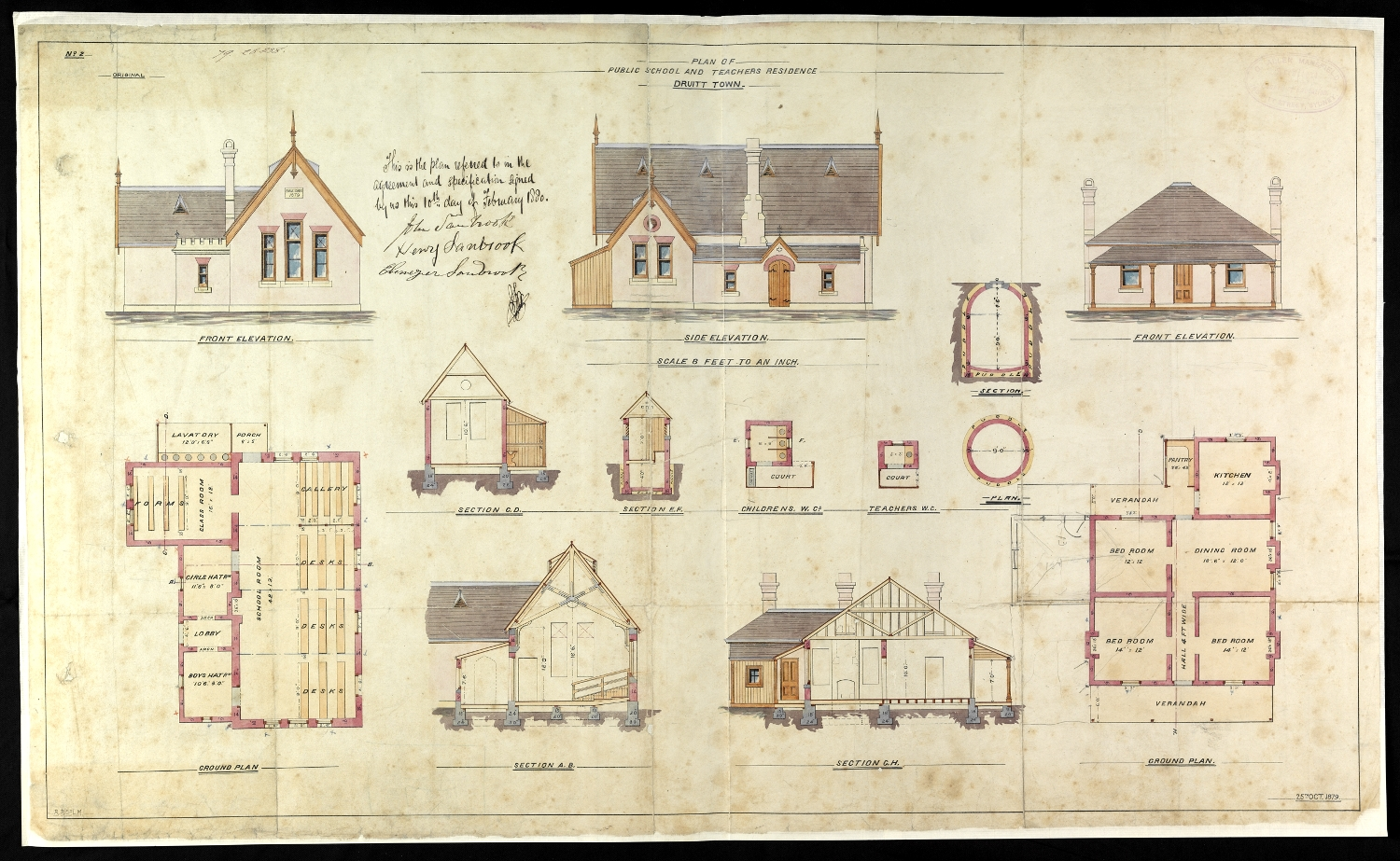
Strathfield South Public School was opened in 1881 as Druitt Town Public School
