= Division of Watson =

Australian federal electoral division

Coordinates: 33.908°S 151.077°E

Watson Australian House of Representatives Division
- Interactive map of electorate boundaries from the 2025 federal election
- Created: 1992
- MP: Tony Burke
- Party: Labor
- Namesake: Chris Watson
- Electors: 116,745 (2025)
- Area: 51 km^{2} (19.7 sq mi)
- Demographic: Inner metropolitan
Electorates around Watson:
| Blaxland | Reid | Reid |
| Fowler | Watson | Grayndler |
| Banks | Banks | Barton |

The Division of Watson is an Australian electoral division in the state of New South Wales.

Watson is an urban electorate in Sydney and since 2025, it extends from the Hume Highway, Canterbury Road to the south, Georges River to the west and Cooks River to the east. It has a large immigrant population, with significant Chinese, Bangladeshi, and Lebanese communities.

Since 2004 its MP has been Tony Burke of the Labor Party, who has served as Minister for Home Affairs, for Immigration and Citizenship and for Cyber Security since 2024 under Prime Minister Anthony Albanese, as well as Leader of the House and Minister for the Arts since 2022.

== History ==
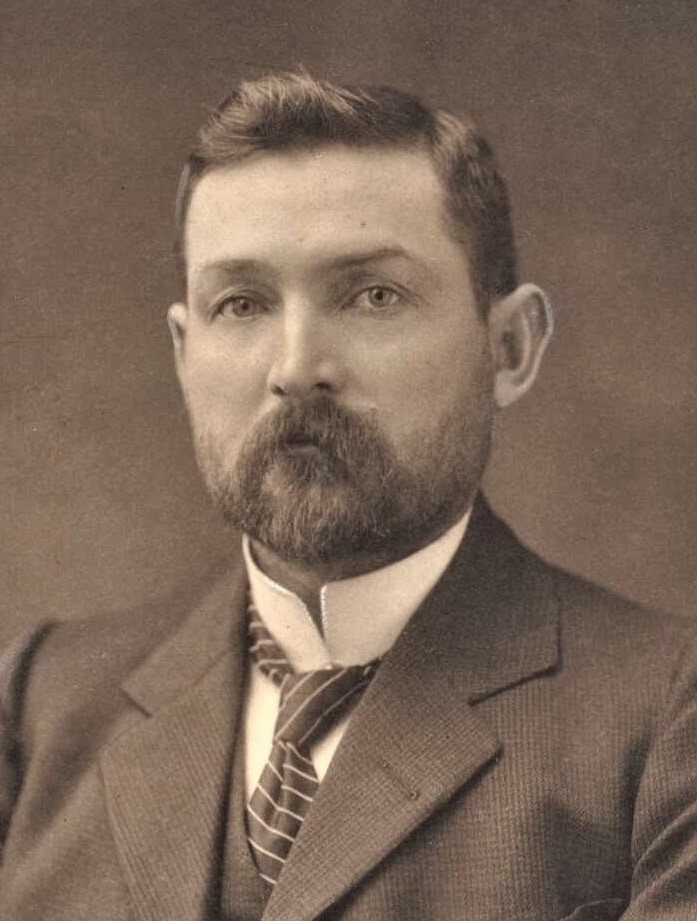
Chris Watson, the division's namesake

The division was created at the redistribution of 31 January 1992, to replace the abolished Division of St George and is named after the Right Honourable Chris Watson, the first Labor Prime Minister of Australia. It was first contested at the 1993 federal election. There was previously another Division of Watson (1934-69), originally Chris Watson's old seat of South Sydney and located in the south-eastern suburbs of Sydney, however that Division is not connected to this one except in name. In the 2009 redistribution, the boundaries of Watson moved significantly northwest, losing the south-eastern suburbs in the St George area such as Hurstville, retaining the south-western suburbs such as Belmore, and adding a significant part of the Inner West.

While St George was a marginal seat, Watson has been a safe Labor seat for nearly all of its existence. The only time Labor's hold was seriously threatened was in 2013, when Labor was held to 56 percent of the two-party vote.

It was previously held by Leo McLeay, a former Speaker of the Australian House of Representatives. The current Member for Watson, since the 2004 federal election, is Tony Burke, a member of the Australian Labor Party.

In 2017, the division had the second-highest percentage of "No" responses in the 2017 Australian Marriage Law Postal Survey, with 69.64% of the electorate's respondents to the survey responding "No". The Survey had strong opposition from Muslim voters in the electorate.

== Demographics ==
Watson is a diverse and socially conservative electorate which is historically working-class. Despite being a stronghold for the centre-left Labor Party, many voters in Watson maintain socially conservative values from their immigrant cultures. According to the 2021 census, only 45% of electors were born in Australia.

At 25%, Watson has one of the highest proportion of Muslims of any electorate in Australia, approximately 8 times the national average.

== Geography ==
The division is located in the south-western suburbs of Sydney. Since the 2024 redistribution, the division includes the suburbs of Bankstown, Bankstown Aerodrome, Belfield, Chullora, Condell Park, Georges Hall, Greenacre, Lakemba, Lansdowne, Mount Lewis, Strathfield South, Wiley Park; as well as parts of Bass Hill, Belmore, Campsie, Canterbury, Punchbowl and Yagoona.

Federal electoral division boundaries in Australia are determined at redistributions by a redistribution committee appointed by the Australian Electoral Commission. Redistributions occur for the boundaries of divisions in a particular state, and they occur every seven years, or sooner if a state's representation entitlement changes or when divisions of a state are malapportioned.

== Members ==
| Image | Member | Party | Term | Notes |
|---|---|---|---|---|
| | Leo McLeay (1945–) | Labor | 13 March 1993 – 31 August 2004 | Previously held the Division of Grayndler. Served as Chief Government Whip in the House under Keating. Retired |
| | Tony Burke (1969–) | Labor | 9 October 2004 – present | Previously a member of the New South Wales Legislative Council. Served as minister under Rudd and Gillard. Incumbent. Currently a minister under Albanese |

== Election results ==
2025 Australian federal election: Watson
| Party | Candidate | Votes | % | ±% |
|---|---|---|---|---|
| Labor | Tony Burke | 39,763 | 48.00 | −6.11 |
| Liberal | Zakir Alam | 12,585 | 15.19 | −11.23 |
| Independent | Ziad Basyouny | 12,209 | 14.74 | +14.74 |
| Greens | Jocelyn Brewer | 7,399 | 8.93 | +1.82 |
| Libertarian | Vanessa Hadchiti | 3,559 | 4.30 | +4.30 |
| One Nation | Elisha Trevena | 2,674 | 3.23 | −2.06 |
| Trumpet of Patriots | John Koukoulis | 2,162 | 2.61 | +2.61 |
| Family First | John Mannah | 1,428 | 1.72 | +1.72 |
| Independent | Zain Khan | 1,055 | 1.27 | +1.27 |
| Total formal votes | | 82,834 | 82.99 | −6.38 |
| Informal votes | | 16,983 | 17.01 | +6.38 |
| Turnout | | 99,817 | 85.73 | +2.41 |
Notional two-party-preferred count
| Labor | Tony Burke | 60,352 | 72.86 | +7.70 |
| Liberal | Zakir Alam | 22,482 | 27.14 | −7.70 |
Two-candidate-preferred result
| Labor | Tony Burke | 55,099 | 66.52 | +1.36 |
| Independent | Ziad Basyouny | 27,735 | 33.48 | +33.48 |
| Labor hold | | Swing | +1.36 | |
