= Enfield, New South Wales =

Enfield
- Suburb
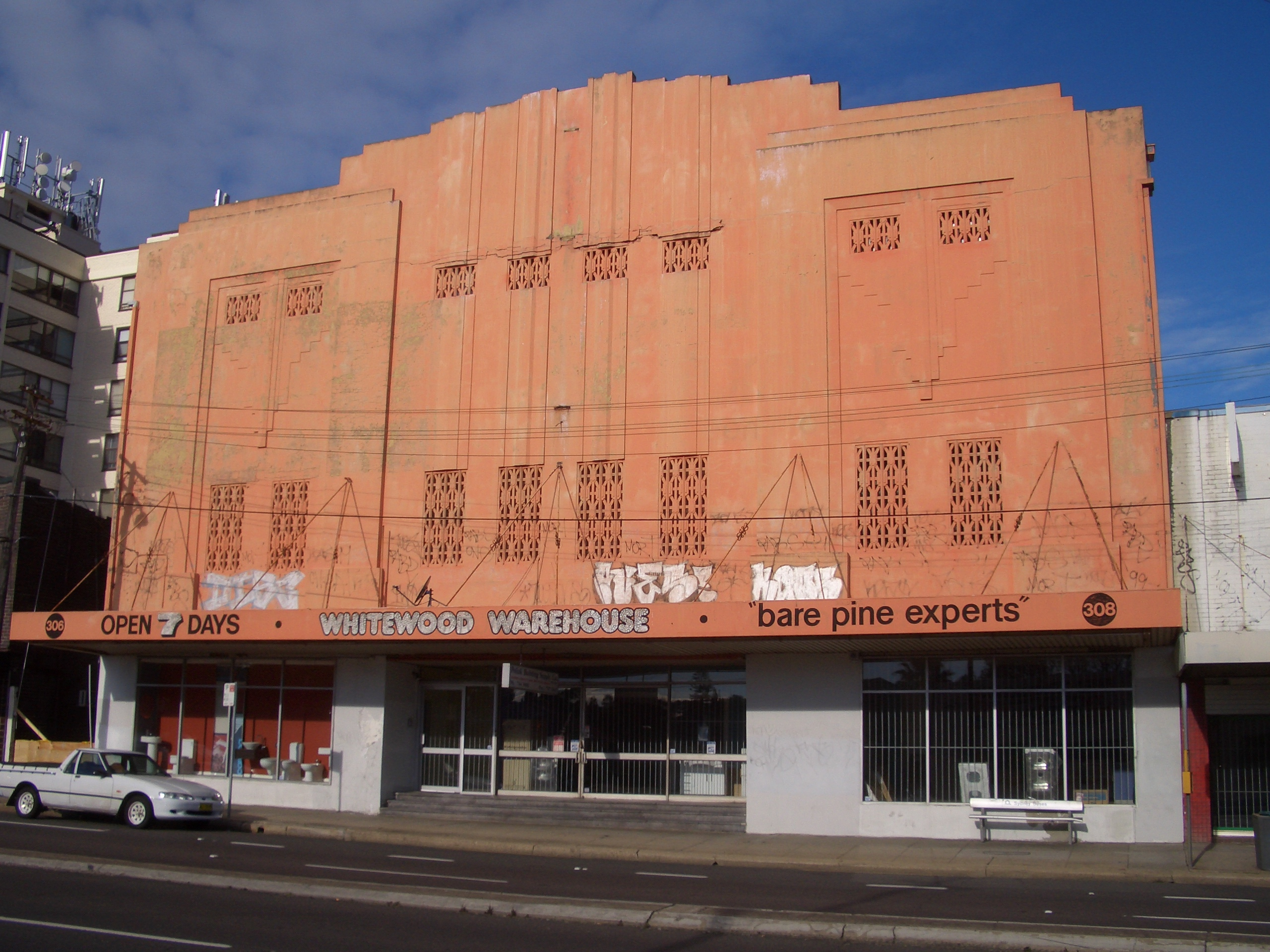
- Former theatre on Liverpool Road, in Enfield

- Interactive map of Enfield
- Coordinates: 33°53′26″S 151°05′33″E
- Country: Australia
- State: New South Wales
- City: Sydney
- LGA: Municipality of Burwood
- Location: 11 km (6.8 mi) from Sydney CBD

Government
  - State electorate: Strathfield
  - Federal division: Grayndler
- Elevation: 42 m (138 ft)

Population
  - Total: 2,992 (2021 census)
- Postcode: 2136
Suburbs around Enfield
Strathfield	Burwood	Burwood Heights
Strathfield South	Enfield	Croydon Park
Belfield	Croydon Park	Croydon Park

Enfield is a suburb in the Inner West of Sydney, in the state of New South Wales, Australia. It is 11 kilometres south-west of the Sydney central business district in the local government area of Municipality of Burwood.

== History ==
The suburb is named after Enfield, a suburb of London, England.

=== Aboriginal culture ===
Before the arrival of the First Fleet in 1788, the Enfield area belonged to the Wangal people, a clan of the Eora tribe, which covered most of Sydney. In the early years, the Eora people were badly affected by smallpox, which arrived with the British. Many of the clans became unsustainably small and the survivors formed new bands who lived where they could. While it would be wrong to say that the local indigenous population gave no resistance to British land claims (Pemulwuy being a notable example), within thirty years or so of the colony's establishment, most of the land in the inner-west had been conceded to British settlers.

=== European settlement ===
William Faithful was granted 100 acres (40 hectares) in 1810 covering what is now Enfield as well as much of Croydon Park and parts of Burwood and Croydon. In 1812, Liverpool Road was built through Faithful's land and the high position of Enfield made it a sensible spot for a staging post along the road. By the mid-1840s a small village had formed and the surrounding area supported vegetable gardening and a timber industry. St Thomas' Anglican Church was built in 1848 and is the oldest surviving building in the suburb.

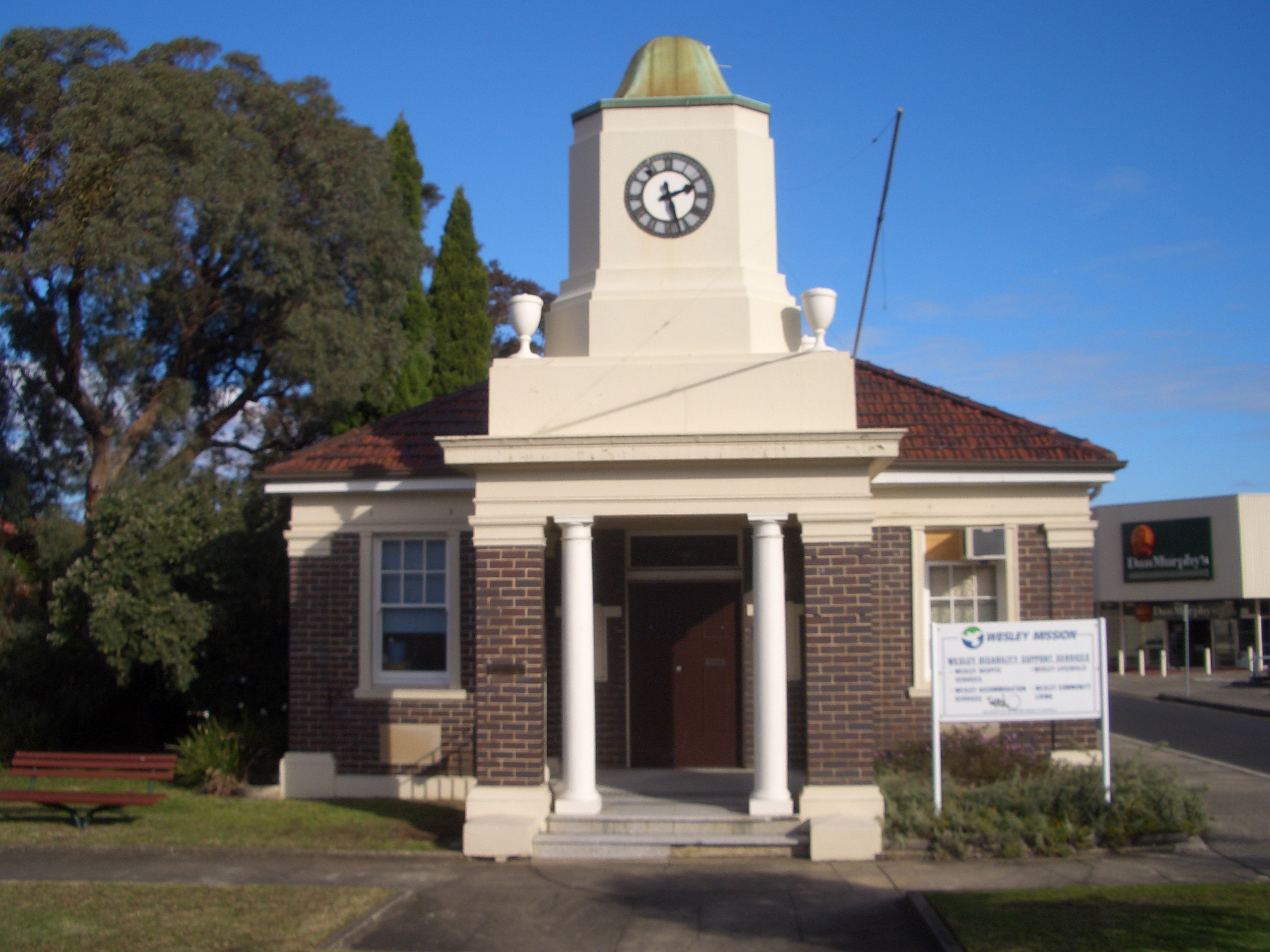
Former Enfield Council Chambers, now in trathfield South

In 1853, a post office was built. This was the first recorded use of the name Enfield for the area although it may already have been unofficially known as that. In 1889, Enfield was deemed large enough to have its own municipal council which covered a larger area than the current suburb including those parts of the current Burwood and Strathfield councils south of Liverpool Rd. In 1891, its municipal population of 2,050 was larger than that of neighbouring Strathfield (1,850) and only just smaller than another neighbour Canterbury (2,426). Enfield retained its separate identity until 1949 when the NSW state government decided to abolish a number of small local councils by amalgamating them with their neighbours. The Municipality of Enfield was split, with the eastern part (present-day Enfield and the western part of Croydon Park) absorbed into the Municipality of Burwood, and the western part (present-day Strathfield South, historically part of Druitt Town) absorbed into the Municipality of Strathfield.

Enfield Olympic Pool, located in Henley Park is the oldest freshwater pool in Sydney, completed in 1933 and officially opened by Bertram Stevens, NSW Premier and Colonial Treasurer, on 18 November 1933.

The Enfield War Memorial, now in Strathfield South, is situated on the corner of Liverpool Road and Coronation Parade on the lawn outside the former Enfield Council Chambers. The memorial is a rectangular sandstone pedestal with four marble plaque panels with the engraved names of the men and women who served during World War I. The top of the pedestal displays a 105mm French howitzer gun that was donated to the Australian Government by the French government as recognition of Australia's wartime assistance during World War I. The Memorial was unveiled on 11 October 1924 by the NSW Attorney-General and later by the Premier of New South Wales from 1927 to 1930. Erection of the memorial was made possible by Mayor and Mayoress of Enfield, Mr and Mrs Ebenezer Ford. The wheel treads of the French howitzer gun which are made of wood are still intact.

=== Enfield tram lines ===
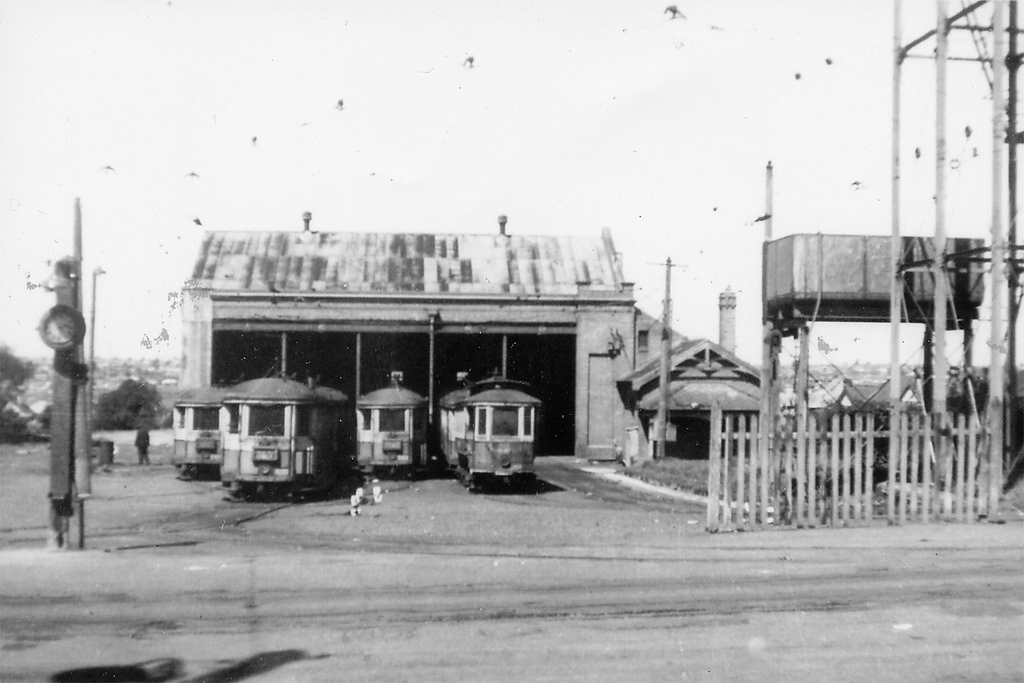
Enfield tram depot, in present-day Croydon Park, in the late 1940s

Between 1891 and 1948, Enfield was served by a tram line centred around a depot in present-day Croydon Park, in Tangarra Street. The line began as a steam tramway, opened in 1891, between Ashfield Station and Enfield. In 1901, this line was extended north via Liverpool Road and Burwood Road through Burwood to Mortlake, and in 1909 a branch to Cabarita Park was opened. The system was electrified in 1912. The line was never connected to any of the other tram lines in Sydney, although its eastern terminus, at Ashfield station, was only one station away (on the main suburban railway line) from the nearest tram terminus at Summer Hill station.

The northern part of Coronation Reserve (the grassy green space that runs down the centre of Coronation Parade) lies on top of the original tram tracks that led, in a straight line, directly north to the intersection with Liverpool Road and the Boulevarde. In the other direction, the line led from Ashfield station.

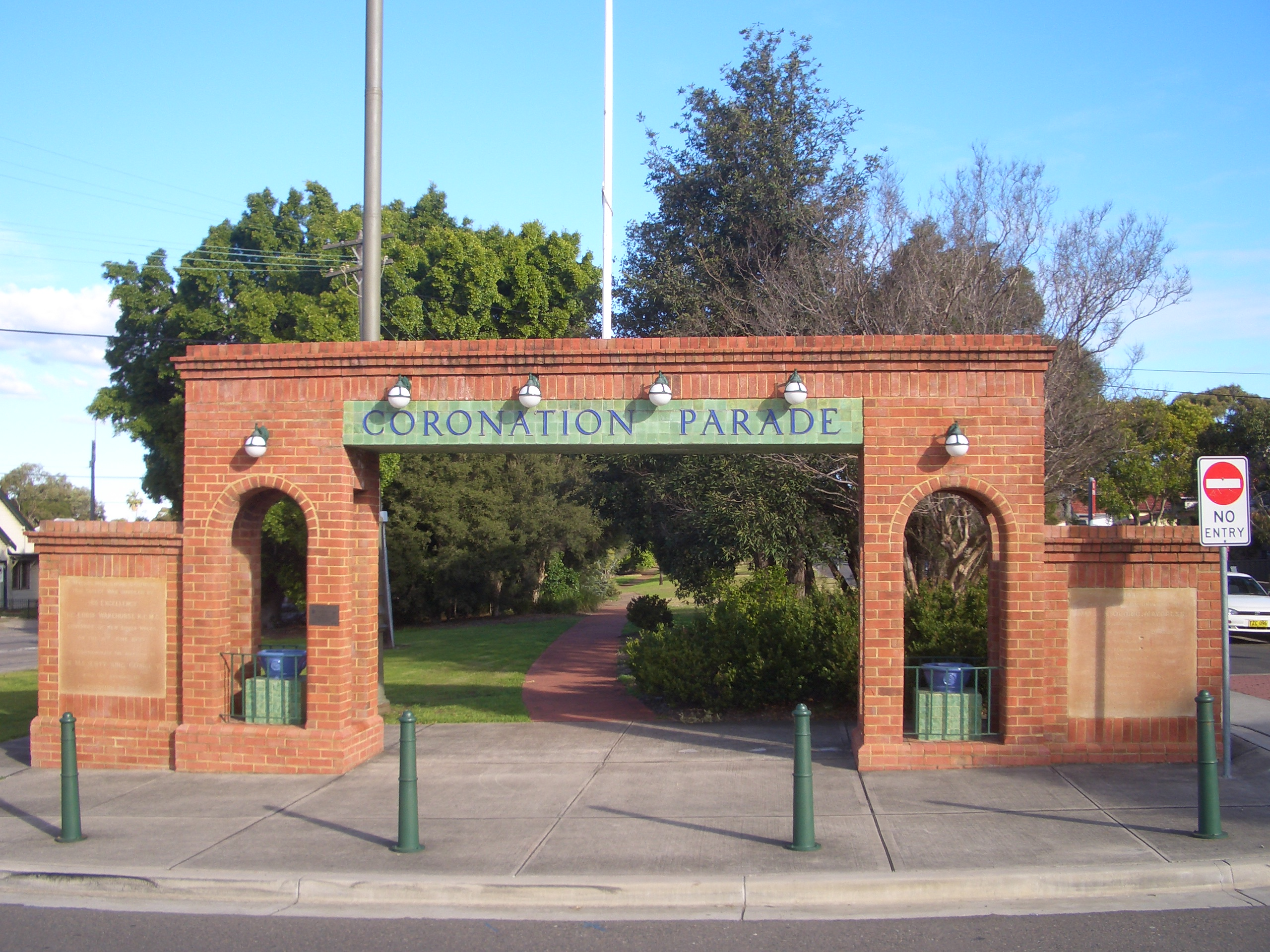
The Coronation Parade Arch, built in 1937 and now on the boundary between Enfield and Strathfield South, displays 4 light bulbs in sockets which were originally the holders for the four electricity cables that ran along the former tram line

Services operated from Ashfield Station along Liverpool Road, Georges River Road and Tangarra Street, then north along Coronation Parade in a straight line passing what is now the Enfield War Memorial and back to Liverpool Road along the boundary between Enfield and Burwood, and then north along Burwood Road through Burwood. The line then turned into Crane Street, then Majors Bay Road and Brewer Street to Cabarita Junction. The line was double track until this point, it then split into single-track branches to Mortlake and Cabarita. Short services were turned back at Brighton Avenue, Plymouth Street, Enfield, Burwood Station and Wellbank St.

Services operated every five minutes between Ashfield and Wellbank Street in peak periods, and every 15 minutes (30 minutes at off-peak times) on the two branches. A depot on Tangarra Street served the lines. The lines closed in 1948, and were replaced by buses.

The roadway to the east of Coronation Reserve, now used for motor through-traffic as part of Coronation Parade, was built beside the original tram track until the main intersection where the road was then built over the tracks and became the Boulevarde. The Coronation Parade Arch, built in 1937 to commemorate the coronation of King George VI, formerly led into the Coronation Parade tram station. The arch displays four light bulbs in sockets which were originally the holders for the four electricity cables that ran along the old tram line.

== Features ==
Enfield itself is a small suburb, bounded by Liverpool Road to the north, Coronation Parade to the west, Mitchell Street to the south and Burwood Road to the east.

There is a small commercial area along Liverpool Road centred on the intersection with Coronation Parade and The Boulevarde. There are other commercial premises around that junction but within the boundaries of the suburbs of SStrathfield, Burwood and Strathfield South. There are larger commercial areas nearby around Strathfield and Burwood stations.

Because Enfield the modern-day suburb is much smaller than the historical Enfield municipality or locality, there are a number of establishments in nearby suburbs that are named "Enfield", but are not in Enfield itself. An example is the Enfield Intermodal Logistics Centre, a large rail yard and logistics hub, which is located in neighbouring Strathfield South. Likewise, neither the historic Enfield Town Hall nor the associated war memorial are in the suburb of Enfield.

=== Churches ===
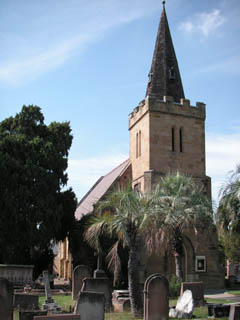
St Thomas's Anglican Church (1848)

St Joseph's Catholic Church on Liverpool Road was built 1930–31. The church was designed by architect Clement Glancy in Inter-War Academic Classical style inspired by Église de la Madeleine, Paris.

St Thomas's Anglican Church, Coronation Parade was built in 1847 to a design by John Frederick Hilly in a Gothic Revival style and is now listed on the Register of the National Estate.

=== Schools ===
Enfield Public School is on Beaumaris Street. St Joseph's Primary School is located on the corner of Burwood and Liverpool Roads and is a Catholic school for kindergarten to Year 6.

=== Sports ===
Enfield Aquatic Centre (Enfield Olympic Swimming Pool) is a council-run swimming pool located in Portland Street. It was opened in 1933 and is the oldest freshwater swimming pool in Sydney.

== Transport ==
Liverpool Road intersects with Coronation Parade and The Boulevarde at Enfield.

Transit Systems operates eight bus services through Enfield:

- 410 from Hurstville to Macquarie Park via Bexley North, Campsie, Burwood, Concord, Rhodes and Ryde
- 420 from Burwood to Mascot via Enfield, Campsie and Sydney Airport
- 464 from Ashfield to Mortlake via Enfield and Burwood
- 480 & 483 from the City (Domain) to Strathfield via Enfield
- 913 from Bankstown to Strathfield via Enfield
- 914 from Greenacre to Strathfield via Enfield
- M90 Liverpool – Burwood

U-Go Mobility operates route 450, from Hurstville to Strathfield via Lakemba and Enfield.

Prior to the 1960s, there was a tramline which ran from Ashfield to Mortlake and Cabarita via Enfield and Burwood following the route of the modern day 464 & 466 bus services.

NASA image of Sydney's CBD and inner west suburbs, with borders of Enfield shown in orange

== Demographics ==
In the 2021 Census, there were 2,992 people in Enfield. 50.2% of people were born in Australia. The next most common countries of birth were China 9.5%, India 3.4%, South Korea 3.0%, Italy 3.0% and Lebanon 2.9%. 43.0% of people spoke only English at home. Other languages spoken at home included Mandarin 10.4%, Arabic 6.0%, Cantonese 5.8%, Italian 5.0% and Korean 4.0%. The most common responses for religion were Catholic 35.1% and No Religion 24.2%.

== Notable residents ==
- James Anderson (1894–1973): tennis player, Australian Open men's singles champion in 1922, 1924 & 1925.
- Andrew Chan (1984–2015): executed drug trafficker and co-ringleader of the Bali Nine
- Gerry Hazlitt (1888–1915): Australian test cricketer (9 tests).
- Bob Norton OBE (1922–1992): a former president of the Royal Australasian College of Dental Surgeons lived in Enfield as a school student.
- Norman 'Wizard' Smith (1890–1958): racing car driver and holder of the Australian land speed record in the 1930s.
- Harold Burfield Taylor (1890–1966): chemist and army officer.
- Bob Windle (born 1944): Australian swimmer, won the Olympic 1500 metre freestyle gold medal at Tokyo in 1964.
