= Belfield, New South Wales =

Belfield
- Suburb
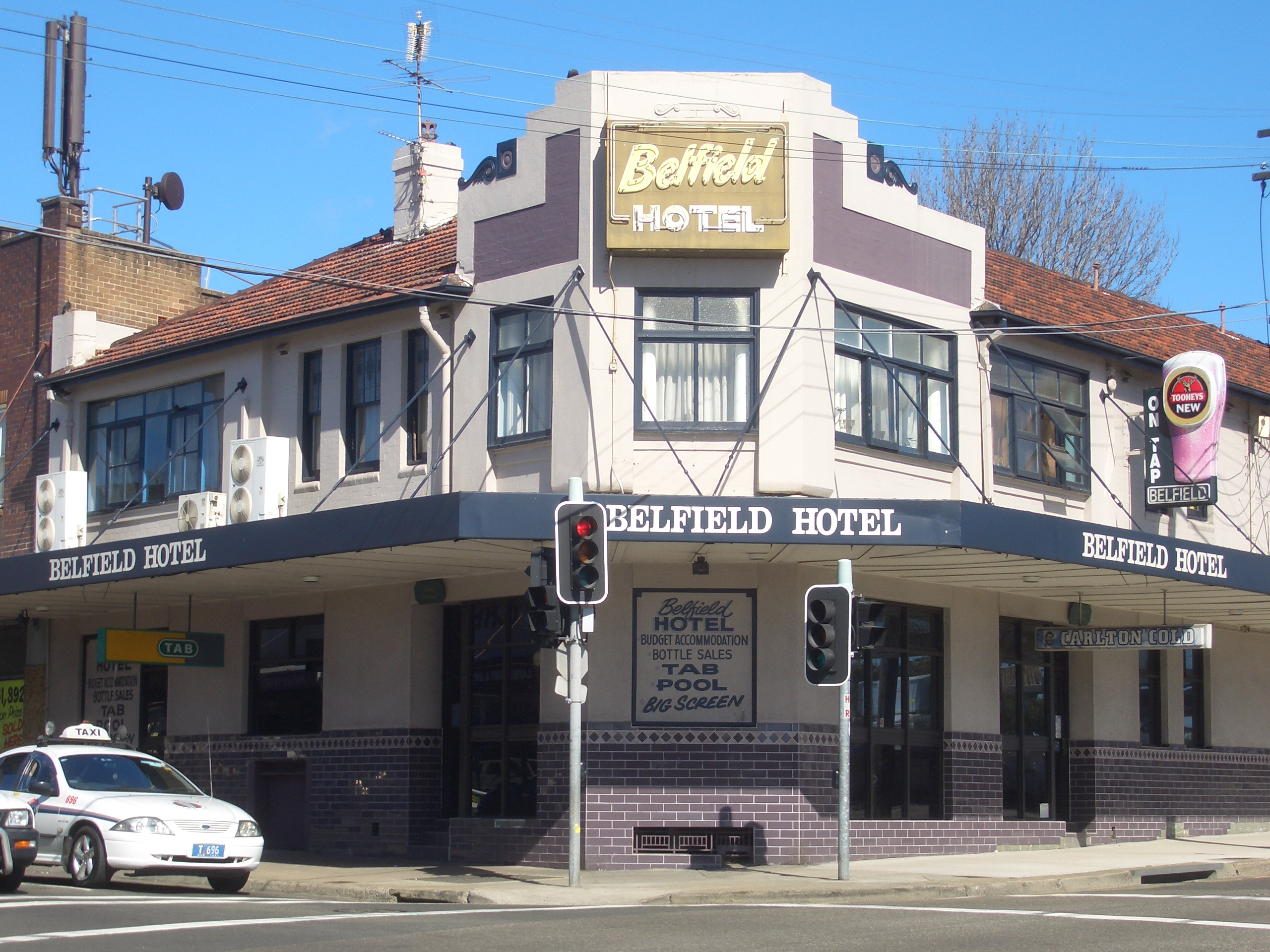
- Belfield Hotel

- Interactive map of Belfield
- Country: Australia
- State: New South Wales
- City: Sydney
- LGA: City of Canterbury-Bankstown
- Location: 12.3 km (7.6 mi) west of Sydney CBD

Government
  - State electorates: Canterbury; Strathfield
  - Federal division: Watson
- Elevation: 27 m (89 ft)

Population
  - Total: 6,555 (2021 census)
- Postcode: 2191
Suburbs around Belfield
Strathfield South	Strathfield South	Enfield
Greenacre	Belfield	Croydon Park
Lakemba	Belmore	Campsie

Belfield is a suburb of Sydney, in the state of New South Wales, Australia. It is 13 kilometres (8 miles) southwest of the Sydney central business district, in the local government area of the City of Canterbury-Bankstown.

== History ==
Land grants were made as early as 1810 for agricultural purposes, on the northern side of Punchbowl Road (towards Strathfield). The "Punch Bowl" was the name that early settlers gave the almost circular valley where the old road to Georges River crossed Cooks River at a ford. This is now where Georges River Road meets Punchbowl Road (the road to "The Punch Bowl") in Belfield.

The name of the suburb is believed to have been created by combining the names of the two neighbouring suburbs, Belmore and Enfield. From information supplied by the Postmaster General's Department, the name "Belfield" first appeared on their records in 1930 when the Belfield branch of the ALP wrote asking that the Department establish a post office at North Belmore. Although several applications were made over the years, it was not until 1936 that the postal inspector reported in favor of a non-official post office. His report read: "...There is a business centre here consisting of sixteen shops, one garage and one Hotel. It is a prosperous business section. This part of the locality is approximately midway between Belmore and Enfield. It is known as Belfield"... - the name derived from its position between the two suburbs mentioned, Belmore and Enfield.

The Department of Lands advised that it had no objection to the use of the name "Belfield" and approval was subsequently given for the establishment of a non-official post office. In 1921, Belfield was the site of one of the first war services home developments in Australia, providing housing for World War I servicemen. The part of Belfield north of Punchbowl Road was in Enfield Council, but was transferred to Strathfield Council in 1949 together with the west ward of Enfield Council.

The place name of "Belfield" was first gazetted in 1977. The official boundaries for Belfield were re-gazetted during August 1993 together with all other suburbs in the Canterbury Local Government Area, and again in 1995.

Three streets are named after World War I sites of importance to Australians; Bazentin Street (after the town Bazentin in the Somme, France, site of the Battle of Bazentin Ridge in July 1916), Persic Street (after the SS Persic, a ship that transported Australian soldiers to Europe during the war) and Mena Street (after Mena Camp, Egypt, an AIF training base prior to the Gallipoli Campaign). A fourth street, Birdwood Avenue, is named after General William Birdwood, the ANZAC commander in Gallipoli.

The majority of houses in Belfield were built after World War II, as public housing. Many of the houses have been turned over to private ownership since then. Australia's first Pizza Hut opened in Belfield in April 1970, but closed in 1998.

In 2023, what was at that time the northern part of Belfield which was within the Municipality of Strathfield (north of Punchbowl Road and south of the Cooks River and Cox Creek) was separated from the southern part within the City of Canterbury-Bankstown and became part of Strathfield South, from which it was (until then) separated by the Cooks River.

== Location ==
Belfield has a mixture of residential, light industrial and commercial areas. A small shopping strip is located along Burwood Road. The northern boundary of Belfield is Punchbowl Road. A crescent-shaped area north of Punchbowl Road and south of the Cooks River and its tributary, Coxs Creek, is in Strathfield Council and was formerly also part of Belfield, but in 2023 was transferred to the suburb of Strathfield South. The Metropolitan Goods Line marks the southwestern boundary for Belfield.

== Demographics ==
According to the 2021 census, there were 6,555 residents in Belfield. 57.4% of residents were born in Australia. The most common other countries of birth were Lebanon 6.0%, China 5.9%, South Korea 3.3%, Italy 2.6% and Greece 2.0%. The most common reported ancestries were Lebanese (19.2%), Australian (14.1%), Italian (12.8%), Chinese (12.6%) and English (10.3%).

42.8% of residents spoke only English at home. Other languages spoken at home included Arabic 15.4%, Mandarin 5.9%, Greek 5.1%, Italian 4.7% and Cantonese 4.4%. The most common responses for religious affiliation were Catholic 40.6%, No Religion 16.4% and Eastern Orthodox 10.3%.

== Schools and churches ==
Belfield has a number of houses of worship, and St. Michael's Primary School opened in 1959. There is also a Uniting Church on Punchbowl Road and a Korean Presbyterian Church (formally Church of England) on Burwood Road.

== Sport ==
The Belfield Bowling and Recreation Club is a bowls club located near the intersection of Punchbowl Road and Georges River Road and the Cooks River. Rudd Park is home to the Belmore Eagles Soccer Club and features two tennis courts, and rugby league Enfield Federals home ground Cooke Park.

== Commercial area ==
A small group of shops, restaurants, post office and a hotel are located on Burwood Road, near the intersection of Punchbowl Road. The Belfield area is being renovated with new shops and apartments. It also includes a pizza bar, a bakery and a cafe.
