= Burwood Heights =

- Suburb
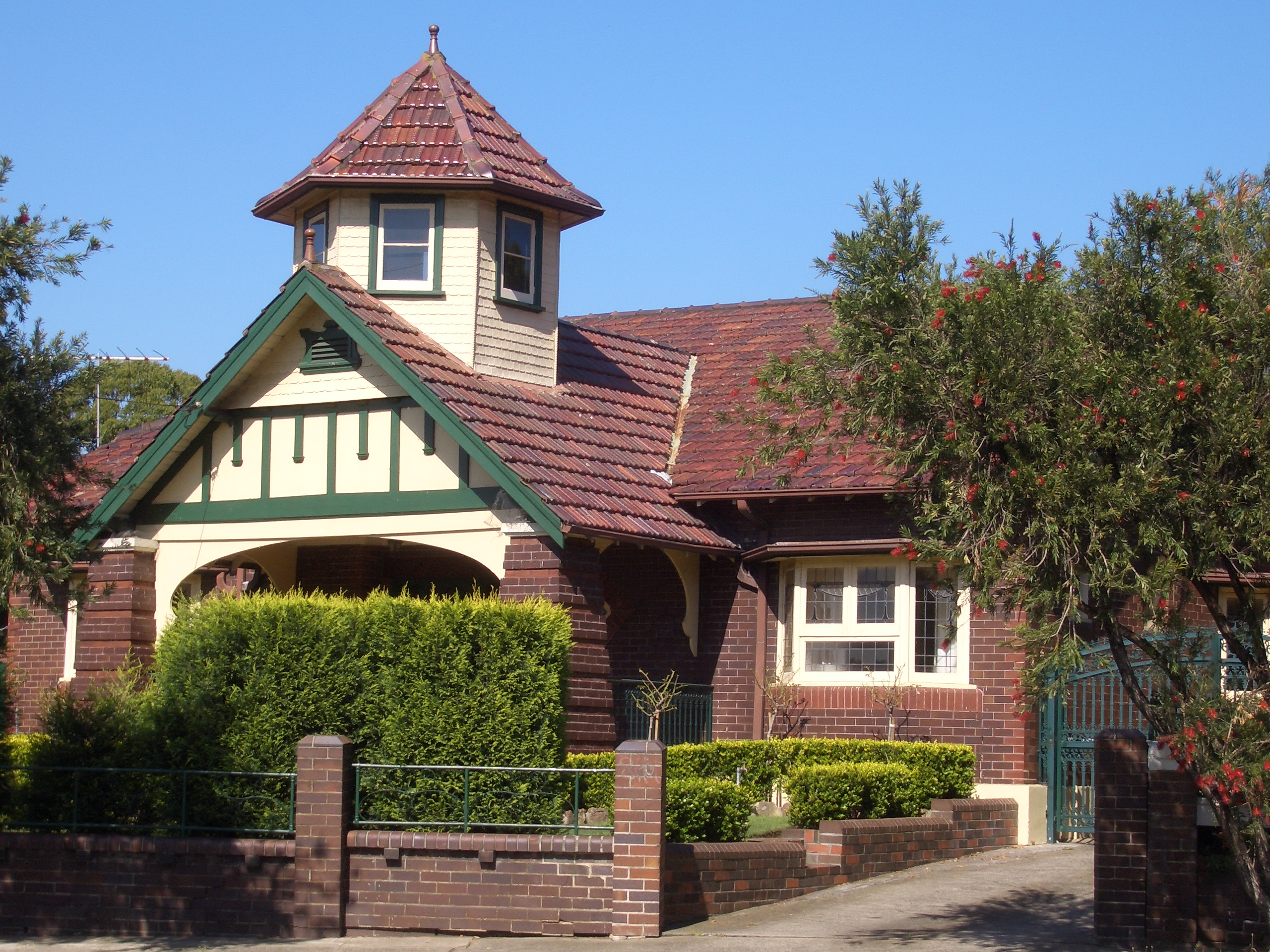
- Federation house on Liverpool Road

- Interactive map of Burwood Heights
- Coordinates: 33°53′25″S 151°06′19″E
- Country: Australia
- State: New South Wales
- City: Sydney
- LGA: Municipality of Burwood
- Location: 10 km (6.2 mi) W of Sydney CBD

Government
  - State electorate: Strathfield
  - Federal division: Grayndler

Area
  - Total: 0.3 km^{2} (0.12 sq mi)
- Elevation: 48 m (157 ft)

Population
  - Total: 1,134 (2021 census)
  - Density: 3,800/km^{2} (9,800/sq mi)
- Postcode: 2136
Suburbs around Burwood Heights
Burwood	Burwood	Croydon
Enfield	Burwood Heights	Croydon
Enfield	Croydon Park	Croydon Park

Burwood Heights is a suburb in the Inner West of Sydney, in the state of New South Wales, Australia. It is located 10 kilometres west of the Sydney central business district and is situated within the local government area of Municipality of Burwood.

Burwood Heights is a residential suburb with no shops, schools or any public buildings. The postcode is 2136, the same as neighbouring Enfield. Burwood is a separate suburb, to the north.

== History ==
The Geographical Names Board of New South Wales assigned Burwood Heights the status of a separate suburb on 19 January 2007.

== Population ==
According to the 2021 census of Population, there were 1,134 residents in Burwood Heights. 46.6% of people were born in Australia. The next most common country of birth was China (excludes SARs and Taiwan) at 11.7%. 41.0% of people spoke only English at home. Other languages spoken at home included Mandarin 10.8% and Arabic 6.6%. The most common responses for religion were Catholic 30.0% and No Religion 27.3%.

== Gallery ==
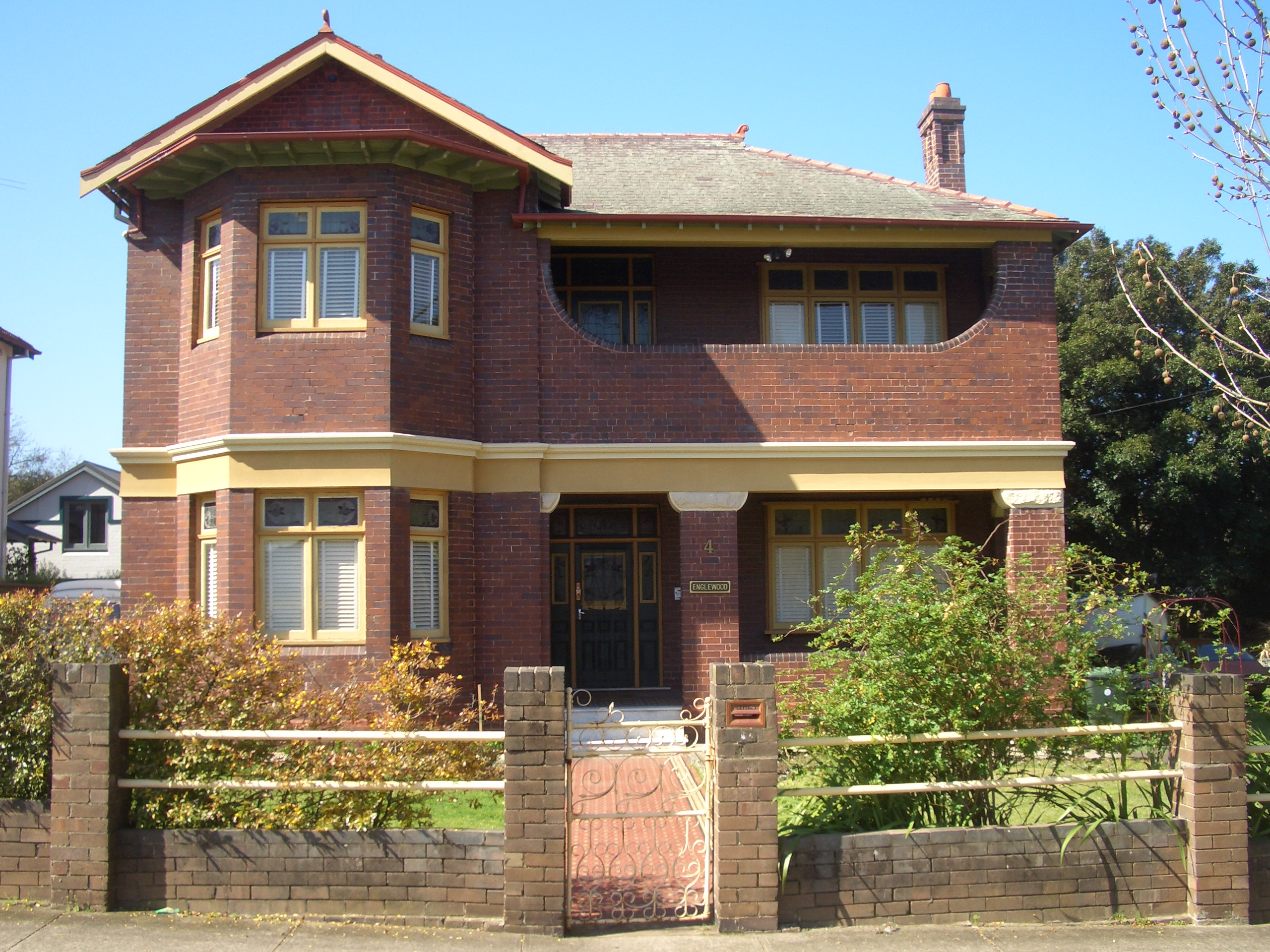

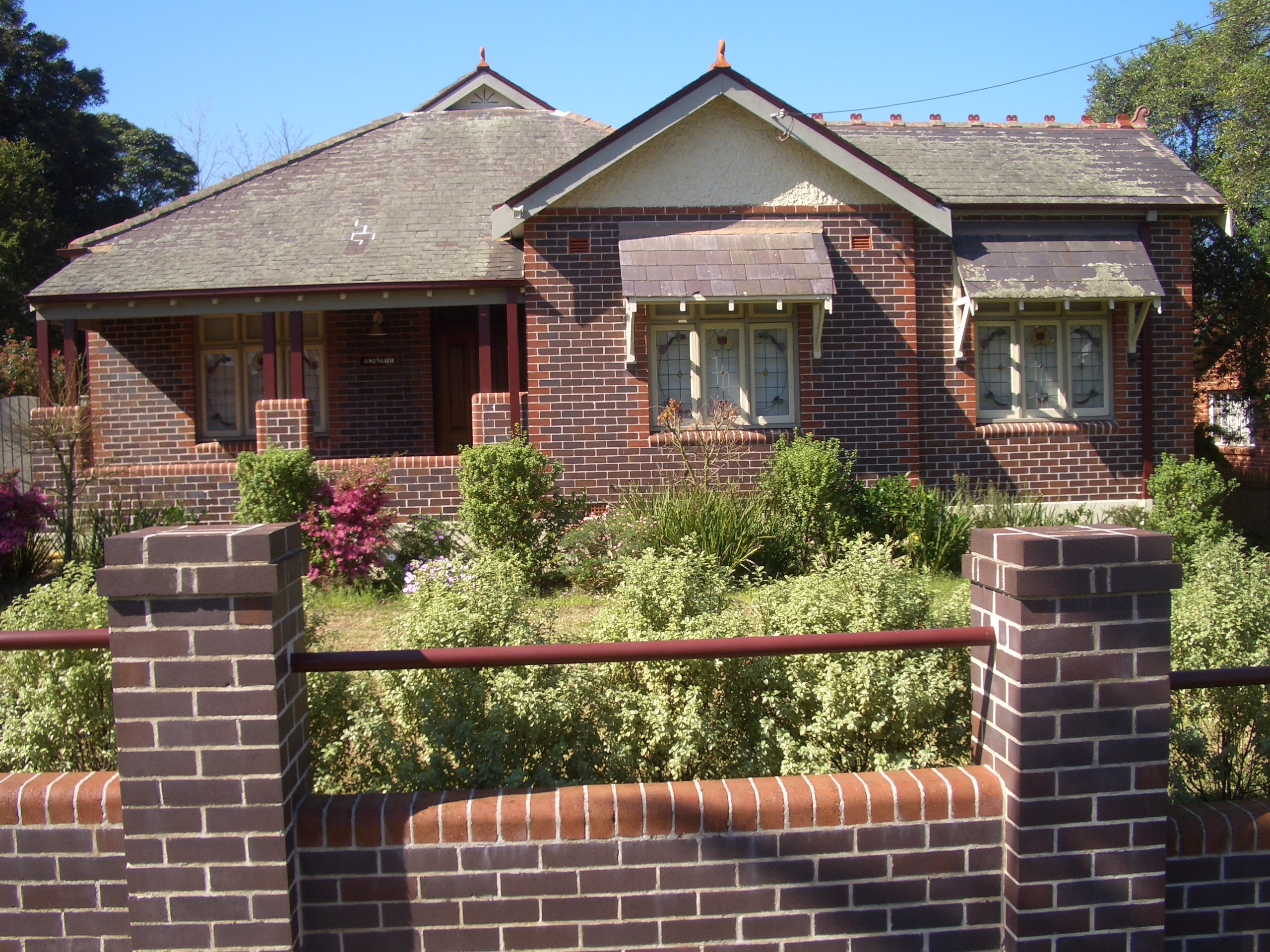

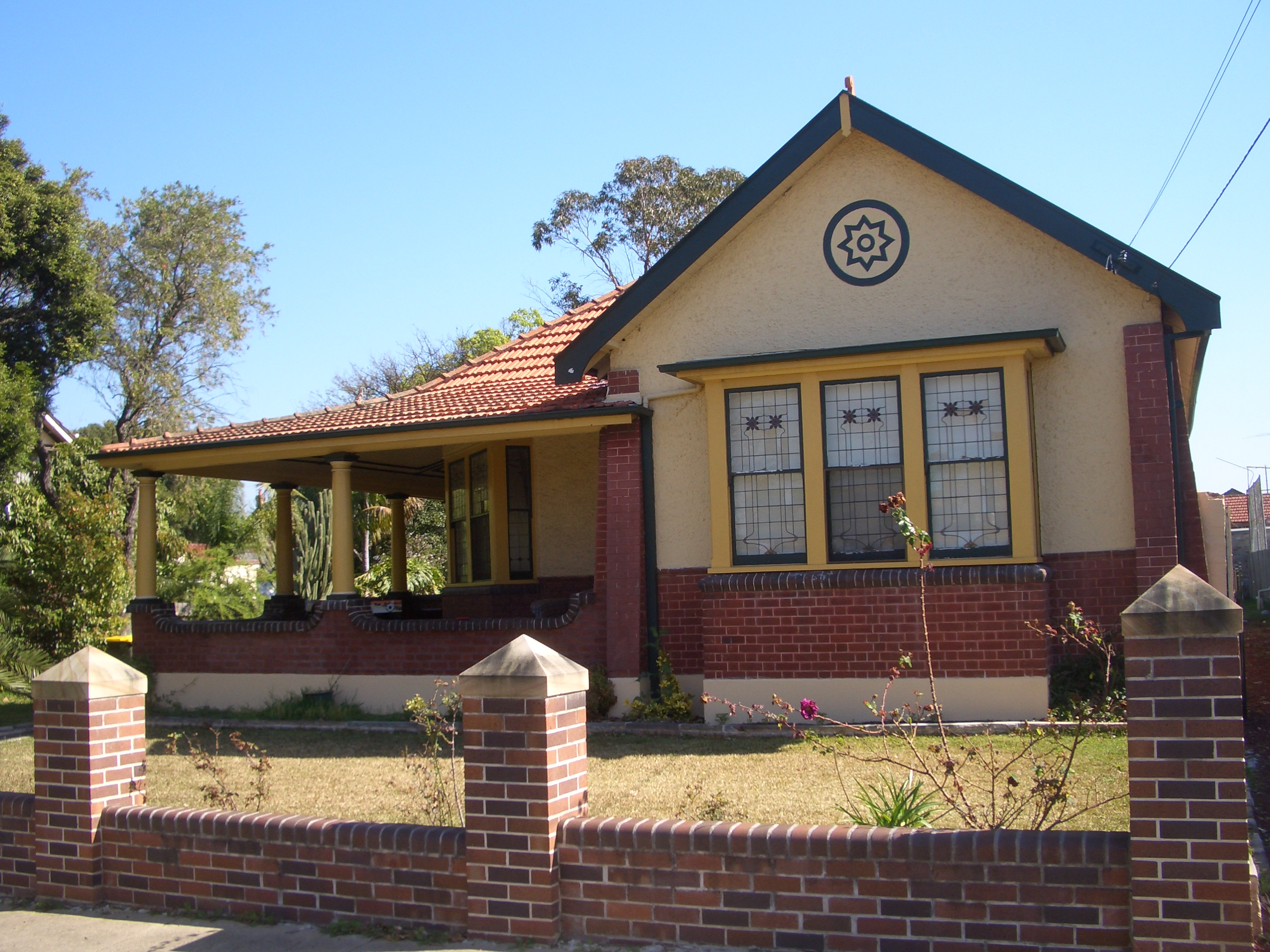

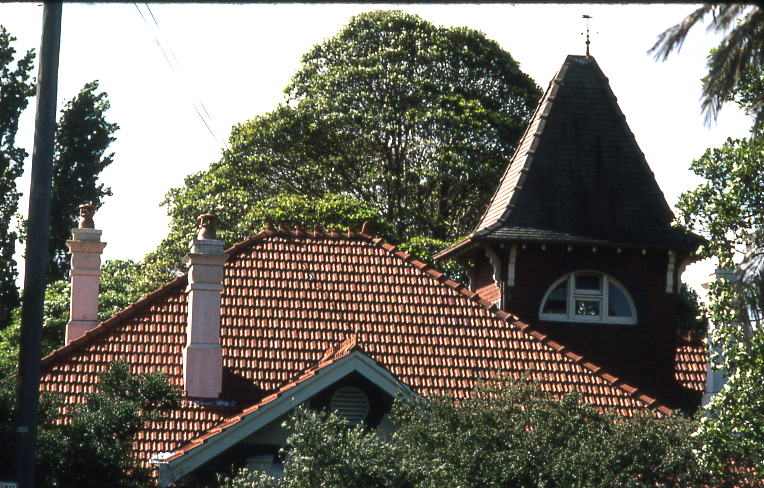
Possibly 70 Burwood Road Burwood Heights

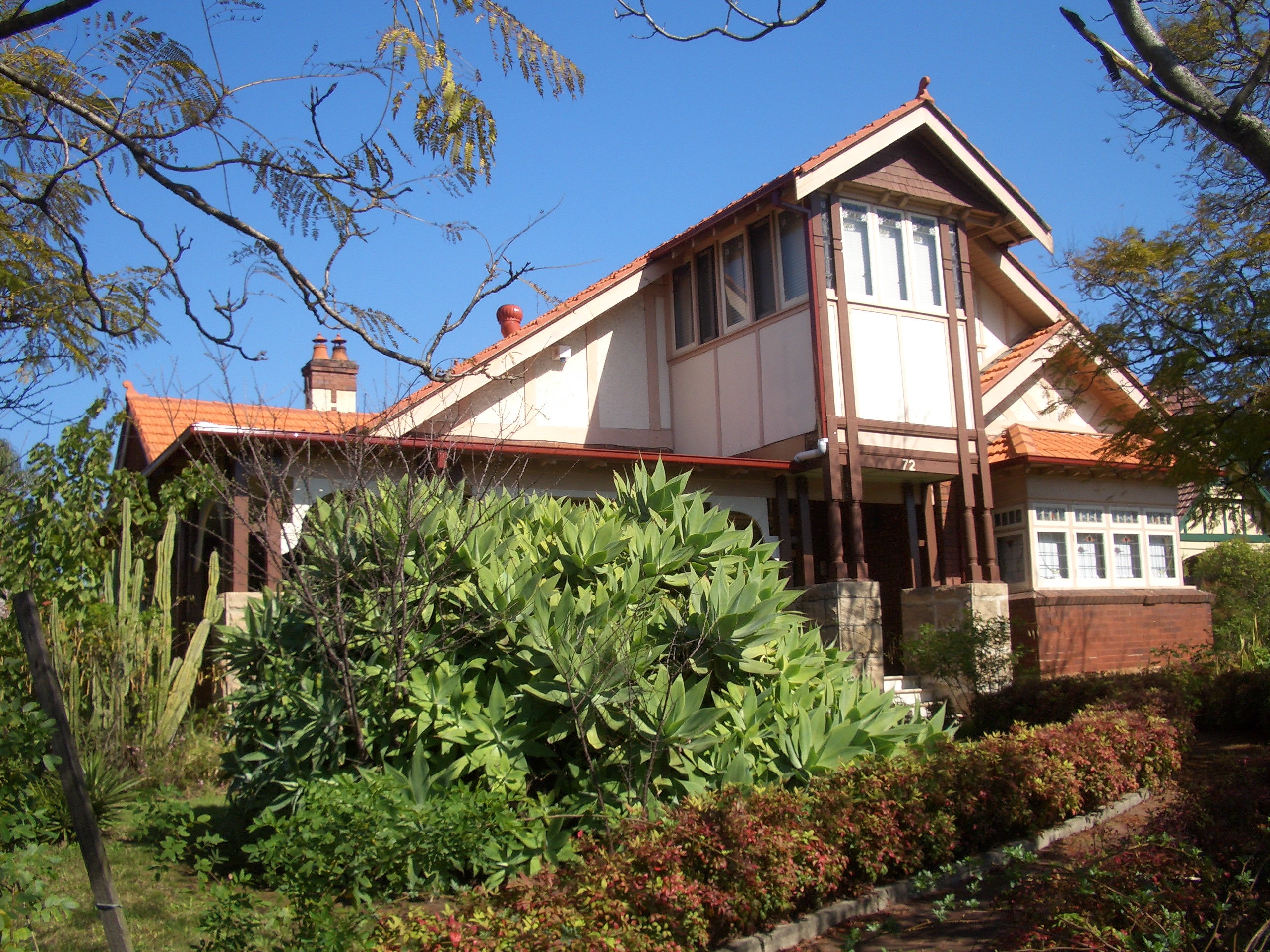
72 Liverpool Road Burwood Heights

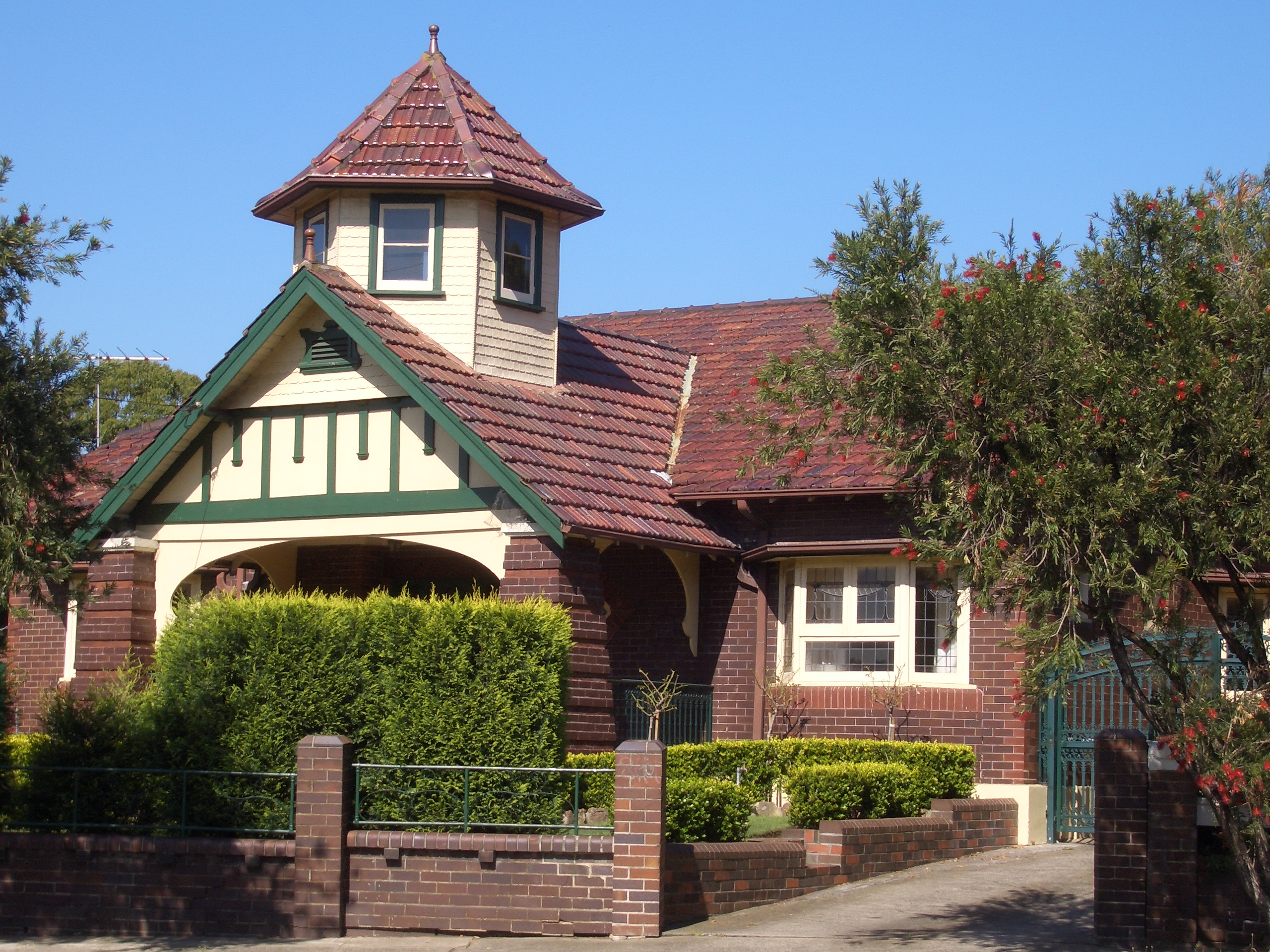
74 Liverpool Road Burwood Heights

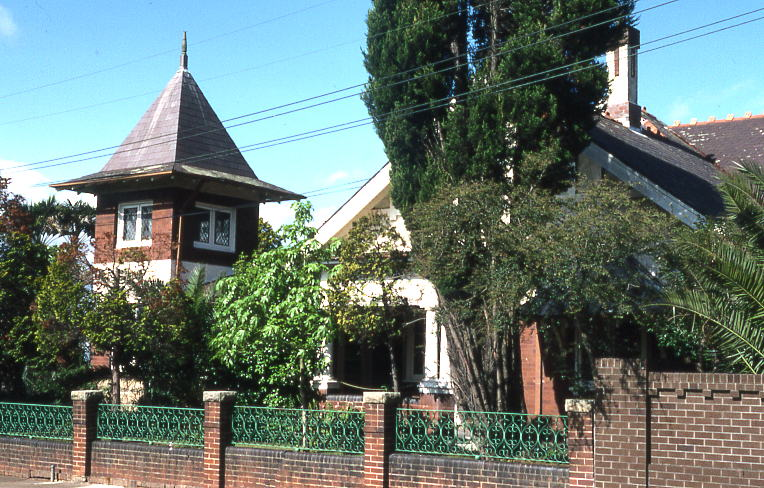
78 Liverpool Road Burwood Heights

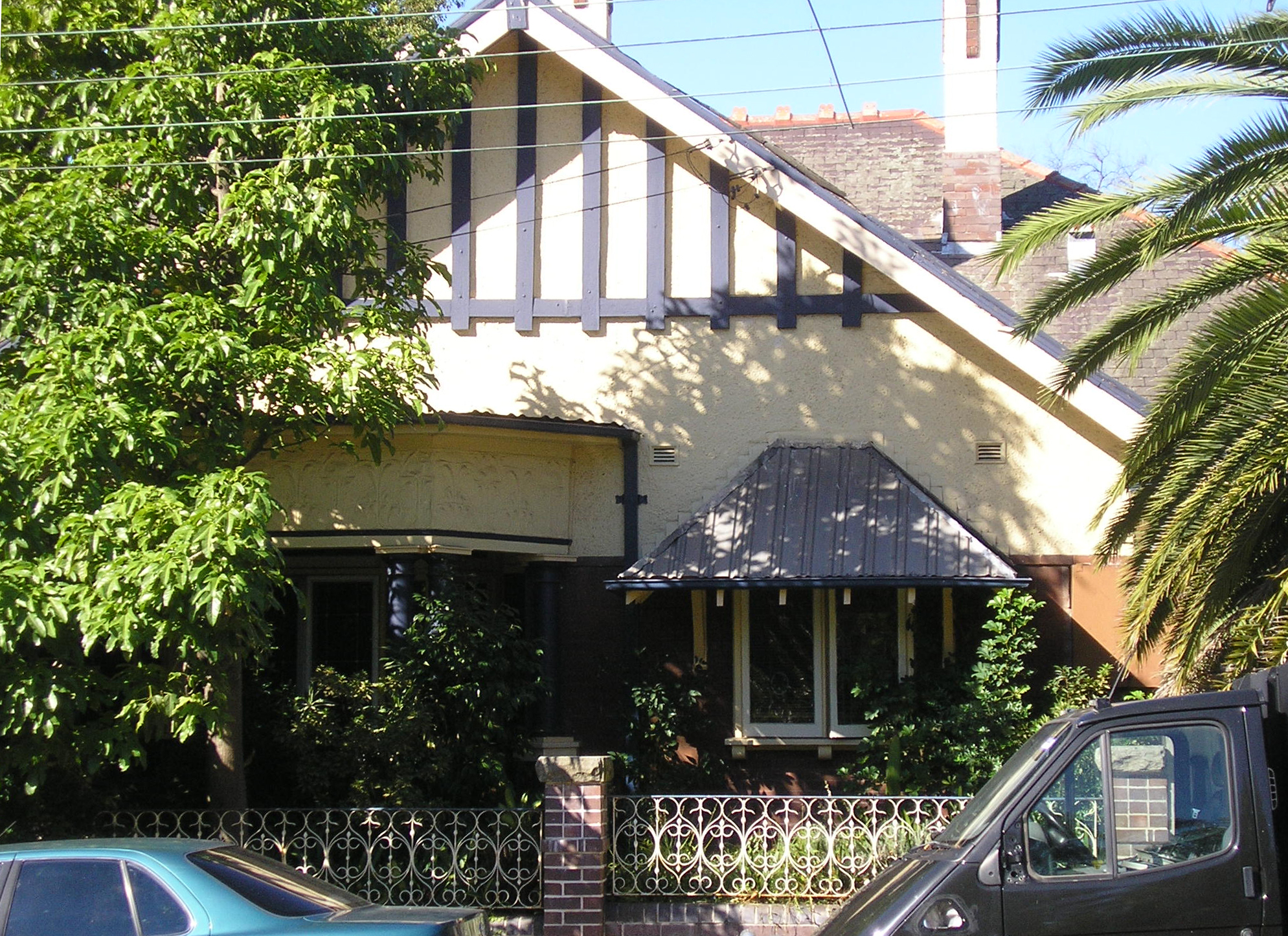
78 Liverpool Road side view Burwood Heights

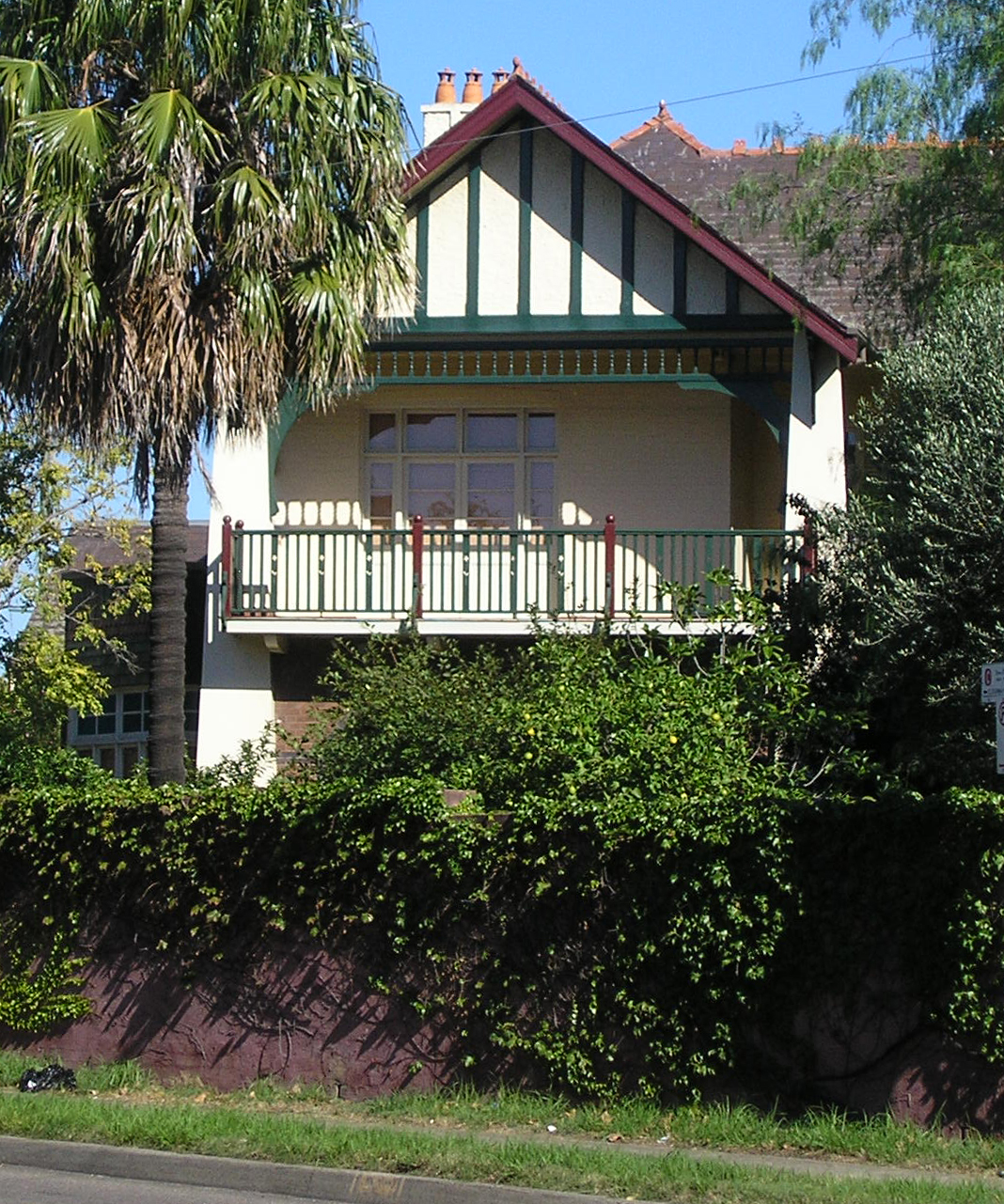
92 Liverpool Road Burwood Heights

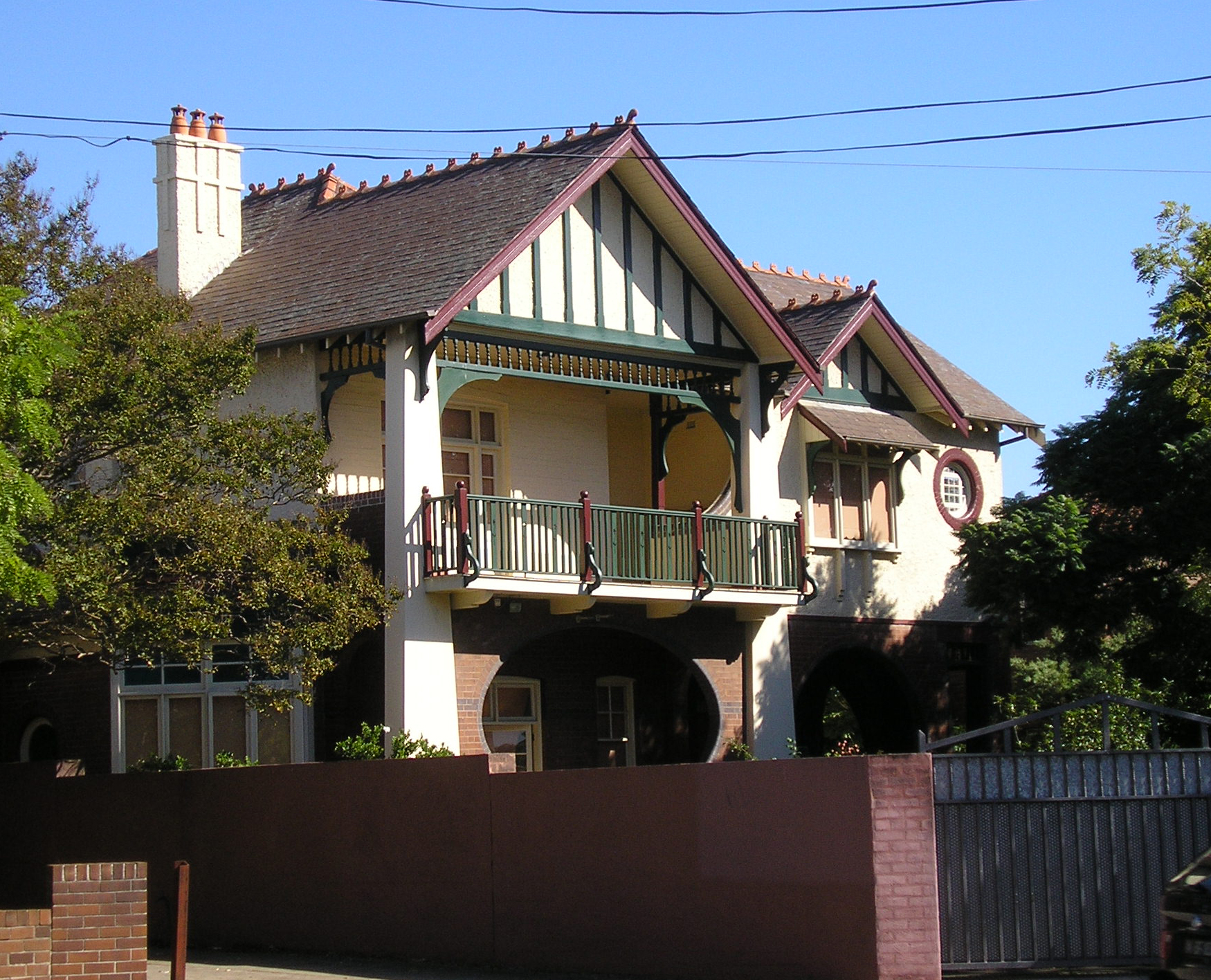
92 Liverpool Road Burwood Heights
