= Mira El Dannawi =

Australian politician

The Honourable Mira El Dannawi MLC
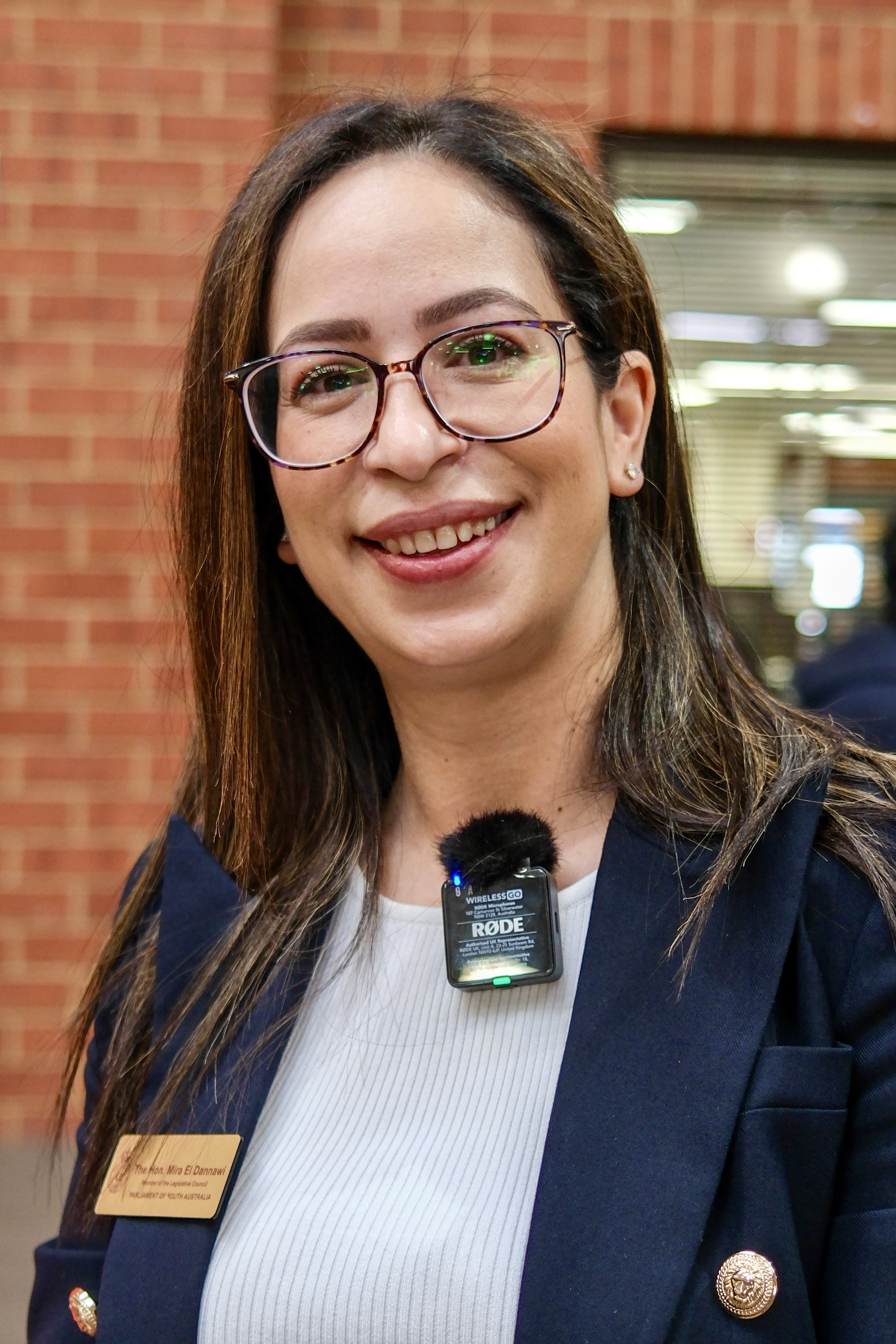
- El Dannawi in 2026

Member of the South Australian Legislative Council
- Incumbent
- Assumed office 17 October 2023
- Preceded by: Irene Pnevmatikos

Personal details
- Born: 1983 or 1984 (age 42–43) Tripoli, Lebanon
- Party: Labor
- Domestic partner: Adrian
- Children: 1
- Education: Lebanese University; Adelaide University (BPsych)
- Occupation: Politician
- Profession: Early childhood educator; trade unionist
- Website: Official website
- Mira El Dannawi's voice El Dannawi speaking about refugee stories Recorded 10 June 2026

Mira El Dannawi (born 1983 or 1984) is an Australian politician and former early childhood educator and trade union organiser. She has been a Labor member of the South Australian Legislative Council since October 2023 and was the first Muslim member of the South Australian parliament.

El Dannawi was born and bred in Tripoli, Lebanon. She studied French literature at Lebanese University and later immigrated to Australia in 2007. She moved to the northeastern suburbs of Adelaide and took English studies and gained qualifications in early childhood education and care. She worked as an educator in Modbury Community Children's Centre for over 13 years, rising through the ranks and became the acting director of the centre in 2022. In addition, she worked as vice-president of United Voice's South Australia Branch and an organiser in the United Workers Union.

El Dannawi joined parliament on 17 October 2023 after being elected jointly to take up the position of Legislative Council opened by the resignation of Irene Pnevmatikos. As a Member of Parliament, she has conducted investigations in committees into food prices, the gig economy, work conditions, and welfare. She was re-elected in an eight-year term at the South Australia elections of 2026 and was appointed to be the chairperson of the Statutory Authorities Review Committee in May 2026. El Dannawi graduated with a Bachelor of Psychology from Adelaide University in October 2026.

== Early life and education ==
Mira El Dannawi was born and grew up in Tripoli, a city located in northern Lebanon, where she grew up together with her sisters and brother. Her father was employed at a shoemaker business that was owned by his father and the rest of the family members. However, due to some economic problems and political instability, including the Lebanese Civil War, this business went bankrupt; her father faced unemployment and job insecurity. Her mother looked after the house.

The parents of El Dannawi put her and her siblings's education above all, even though the family had some financial problems. She received education in French, and later on, studied French literature at the Lebanese University.

In 2007, when she was 23 years old, El Dannawi moved to Australia and did not know English or have any relatives there. She moved to Adelaide's north-eastern suburbs. She received a Certificate II in English language, then a Certificate III, and also a diploma in early childhood education and care.

== Teaching and union work ==
Following the completion of her Certificate III course, El Dannawi started working at Modbury Community Children's Centre. For more than 13 years, she has been working in the area of early childhood education until joining politics, where she advanced from the positions of being an educator, an assistant director, and a director.

El Dannawi became part of the union movement as a workplace delegate. El Dannawi then joined as the vice-president of the South Australian branch of United Voice and also worked as an organiser for the United Workers Union.

El Dannawi took part in the strike by the childcare workers for a wage rise of almost 35 percent in 2018 during her employment as a team leader. She accused the Turnbull government of inaction, and claimed that she was thinking about quitting the occupation but would continue to lobby.

In 2022, El Dannawi was appointed as the acting director of the children's center where she manages 23 employees and supports more than 100 families.

== Political career ==
El Dannawi was endorsed by the Australian Labor Party State Executive on 12 October 2023 to take up the South Australian Legislative Council seat vacated when Irene Pnevmatikos resigned. She was elected into this vacant seat in a joint sitting of both Houses of Parliament on 17 October. This made her become the first Muslim member of the South Australian Parliament.

El Dannawi was appointed to the committees of Social Development, Budget and Finance, and those related to the gig economy and Return to Work SA program upon joining the parliament.

Following incidents of fires near two Adelaide mosques on 25 October 2023, El Dannawi spoke against Islamophobia, hate speech and extremism, and appreciated the way Premier Peter Malinauskas handled the situation. She described that period as being a difficult one for the Muslim community in South Australia. According to the police at the time, the fires were neither connected nor racially motivated.

El Dannawi was appointed to the select committee of grocery pricing in the Legislative Council on 7 February 2024. Membership of the gig economy committee ended for her on 4 June of the same year.

El Dannawi adorned herself with a keffiyeh scarf on 15 May 2024, while addressing the Legislative Council together with Tammy Franks and Connie Bonaros, to show support for the Palestinians. Her wearing of the scarf incurred criticism from opposition upper house leader Nicola Centofanti, who termed her actions as divisive.

On 16 October 2024, El Dannawi voted against the bill of Liberal MLC Ben Hood that aimed at amending the laws concerning abortion in South Australia by mandating that induced delivery be used rather than abortion for all terminations beyond 27 weeks and six days of pregnancy. El Dannawi, being a member of the Labor Left faction, was one of seven Labor MLCs who rejected the bill.

The grocery pricing committee made its report on 26 November 2024. El Dannawi, along with her Labor colleague, Reggie Martin, were against the proposal of the committee regarding payroll tax concessions for the fresh produce and primary production food enterprises. El Dannawi stated that no evidence was provided by the committee proving that the proposal could promote competitiveness or lower prices and that it may benefit bigger businesses over smaller competitors. Her appointment on the grocery pricing committee and the committee that examined the Return to Work SA program was completed on that day.

On 28 November 2024, El Dannawi became a member of the Joint Committee on the Mental Health and Wellbeing of Veterinarians in South Australia and the committee investigating the Children and Young People (Safety and Support) Bill. Her membership of the latter ended on 4 February 2025.

The term of El Dannawi as a member of the Social Development Committee expired on 18 June 2025, followed by her membership of the Budget and Finance Committee on 21 August. By November 2025, she was the chair of the Friends of France parliamentary group, while the deputy opposition leader in the House of Assembly was the deputy chair of that group.

In the 2026 South Australian Legislative Council election, El Dannawi was re-elected to the Legislative Council for an eight-year term. She was the fifth candidate to be declared elected, securing 94,829 votes and achieving the quota through the transfer of surplus votes from Labor's leading candidate, Emily Bourke. El Dannawi received 403 below-the-line first-preference votes. The Labor Party won five seats with 417,728 votes, which constituted around 36.7 per cent of the Legislative Council vote.

On 19 May 2026, El Dannawi became a presiding member of the Statutory Authorities Review Committee and served on the Natural Resources Committee. On 19 August, she became a member of the committee considering the conduct of real estate professionals, and on 2 September, she was a member of the committee considering the Social Worker Registration Scheme. El Dannawi graduated from Adelaide University with a Bachelor of Psychology on 1 October.

== Personal life ==
As of 2023, El Dannawi's partner was Adrian. She has a daughter and speaks Arabic, French and English.
