= Easson =

Easson is a surname. Notable people with the surname include:

- Frederick Easson (1905–1988), Scottish Episcopal Church bishop of the Diocese of Aberdeen and Orkney in Scotland, United Kingdom
- Gordon Easson (1928–2009), Scottish soccer player
- Jimmy Easson "Jimmy" Easson (1906–1983), Scottish footballer who played as an inside-forward for Portsmouth in the English Football League
- Mary Easson (born 1955), Australian Labor Party Member of the House of Representatives for the Division of Lowe from 1993
- Michael Easson AM (born 1955), Australian businessman and former union leader
