= Electoral results for the Division of Lowe =

Australian division election results

This is a list of electoral results for the Division of Lowe in Australian federal elections from the division's creation in 1949 until its abolition in 2010.

== Members ==
Member	Party	Term
(Sir) William McMahon	Liberal	1949–1982
Michael Maher	Labor	1982–1987
Bob Woods	Liberal	1987–1993
Mary Easson	Labor	1993–1996
Paul Zammit	Liberal	1996–1998
Paul Zammit	Independent	1998–1998
John Murphy	Labor	1998–2010

== Election results ==
=== Elections in the 2000s ===
==== 2007 ====
2007 Australian federal election: Lowe
Party	Candidate	Votes	%	±%
Labor	John Murphy	38,766	49.27	+6.23
Liberal	Jim Tsolakis	31,518	40.06	−2.90
Greens	Marc Rerceretnam	6,774	8.61	−0.07
Christian Democrats	Bill Shailer	1,616	2.05	+0.04
Total formal votes		78,674	95.05	+1.65
Informal votes		4,098	4.95	−1.65
Turnout		82,772	94.97	+1.56
Two-party-preferred result
Labor	John Murphy	45,136	57.37	+4.34
Liberal	Jim Tsolakis	33,538	42.63	−4.34
Labor hold		Swing	+4.34	

==== 2004 ====
2004 Australian federal election: Lowe
Party	Candidate	Votes	%	±%
Labor	John Murphy	32,777	42.89	−1.88
Liberal	John Sidoti	32,654	42.73	+0.77
Greens	Shireen Murphy	7,057	9.24	+5.04
Christian Democrats	Peter Rahme	1,519	1.99	+1.99
Democrats	Biannca Pace	1,013	1.33	−3.16
Liberals for Forests	Timothy Avery	717	0.94	+0.94
One Nation	John Mason	678	0.89	−1.06
Total formal votes		76,415	93.45	−0.75
Informal votes		5,354	6.55	+0.75
Turnout		81,769	94.31	−0.60
Two-party-preferred result
Labor	John Murphy	40,727	53.30	−0.51
Liberal	John Sidoti	35,688	46.70	+0.51
Labor hold		Swing	−0.51	

==== 2001 ====
2001 Australian federal election: Lowe
Party	Candidate	Votes	%	±%
Labor	John Murphy	33,508	44.77	+8.64
Liberal	David Doust	31,400	41.96	+8.72
Democrats	Anna Garrett	3,359	4.49	+2.09
Greens	Mersina Soulos	3,145	4.20	+2.42
Unity	Ernest Wong	1,700	2.27	−1.76
One Nation	Harry Krumins	1,463	1.95	−1.73
	Max Lane	267	0.36	+0.36
Total formal votes		74,842	94.20	−1.26
Informal votes		4,606	5.80	+1.26
Turnout		79,448	95.38	
Two-party-preferred result
Labor	John Murphy	40,271	53.81	−0.89
Liberal	David Doust	34,571	46.19	+0.89
Labor hold		Swing	−0.89	

=== Elections in the 1990s ===
==== 1998 ====
1998 Australian federal election: Lowe
Party	Candidate	Votes	%	±%
Labor	John Murphy	26,730	36.03	−3.07
Liberal	Robert Lee	24,617	33.18	−13.50
Independent	Paul Zammit	11,700	15.77	+15.77
Unity	Chris Wong	2,813	3.79	+3.79
One Nation	John Wright	2,768	3.73	+3.73
Democrats	Jeff Meikle	1,714	2.31	−2.01
No Aircraft Noise	Vince Sicari	1,603	2.16	−0.78
Greens	Natasha Verco	1,300	1.75	−0.13
Christian Democrats	Owen Davies	597	0.80	−0.27
Independent	Giancarlo Maisano	267	0.36	+0.36
Natural Law	Gary Wilkinson	80	0.11	−0.17
Total formal votes		74,189	95.39	+0.62
Informal votes		3,585	4.61	−0.62
Turnout		77,774	94.95	−1.51
Two-party-preferred result
Labor	John Murphy	40,527	54.63	+7.09
Liberal	Robert Lee	33,662	45.37	−7.09
Labor gain from Liberal		Swing	+7.09	

==== 1996 ====
1996 Australian federal election: Lowe
Party	Candidate	Votes	%	±%
Liberal	Paul Zammit	33,966	46.68	+5.12
Labor	Mary Easson	28,447	39.10	−8.41
Democrats	Noel Plumb	3,143	4.32	+2.81
Independent	Peter Woods	2,279	3.13	+0.72
No Aircraft Noise	Michelle Calvert	2,137	2.94	+2.94
Greens	Doug Hine	1,367	1.88	+1.88
Call to Australia	Katie Wood	782	1.07	+0.40
Independent	Dave Allen	271	0.37	+0.37
Natural Law	Bob Hughes	204	0.28	+0.07
	Max Lane	167	0.23	+0.23
Total formal votes		72,763	94.77	−0.85
Informal votes		4,016	5.23	+0.85
Turnout		76,779	96.46	+0.64
Two-party-preferred result
Liberal	Paul Zammit	37,978	52.47	+7.48
Labor	Mary Easson	34,405	47.53	−7.48
Liberal gain from Labor		Swing	+7.48	

==== 1993 ====
1993 Australian federal election: Lowe
Party	Candidate	Votes	%	±%
Labor	Mary Easson	34,463	47.51	+8.73
Liberal	Bob Woods	30,151	41.56	−2.85
Greens in Lowe	Bruce Threlfo	1,827	2.52	-1.89
Independent	Peter Woods	1,751	2.41	+2.41
Independent	Anthony Panzarino	1,395	1.92	+1.92
Democrats	Jeff Meikle	1,092	1.51	−6.07
AAFI	Erika Jones	717	0.99	+0.99
Call to Australia	Peter Peterson	490	0.68	−0.70
Independent	Kate Cummings	410	0.57	+0.57
Natural Law	Richard Eager	155	0.21	+0.21
	Erik Lowry	91	0.13	+0.13
Total formal votes		72,542	95.62	−0.54
Informal votes		3,326	4.38	+0.54
Turnout		75,868	95.81	
Two-party-preferred result
Labor	Mary Easson	39,868	55.01	+4.45
Liberal	Bob Woods	32,610	44.99	−4.45
Labor hold		Swing	+4.45	

==== 1990 ====
1990 Australian federal election: Lowe
Party	Candidate	Votes	%	±%
Liberal	Bob Woods	28,892	45.9	−1.3
Labor	Mary Easson	23,764	37.8	−9.3
Democrats	Andrew Mignot	4,612	7.3	+7.3
Greens in Lowe	Bruce Threlfo	3,193	5.1	+5.1
Independent	Corrado Galimberti	1,652	2.6	+2.6
Call to Australia	Peter Peterson	828	1.3	+1.3
Total formal votes		62,941	96.4	
Informal votes		2,349	3.6	
Turnout		65,290	94.8	
Two-party-preferred result
Liberal	Bob Woods	31,794	50.6	−1.0
Labor	Mary Easson	31,013	49.4	+1.0
Liberal hold		Swing	−1.0	

=== Elections in the 1980s ===
==== 1987 ====
1987 Australian federal election: Lowe
Party	Candidate	Votes	%	±%
Liberal	Bob Woods	29,724	47.2	+3.7
Labor	Michael Maher	29,644	47.1	−2.3
Independent	George Turner	2,197	3.5	+3.5
Unite Australia	Tony Farrell	1,432	2.3	+2.3
Total formal votes		62,997	94.4	
Informal votes		3,702	5.6	
Turnout		66,699	93.6	
Two-party-preferred result
Liberal	Bob Woods	32,520	51.6	+3.8
Labor	Michael Maher	30,454	48.4	−3.8
Liberal gain from Labor		Swing	+3.8	

==== 1984 ====
1984 Australian federal election: Lowe
Party	Candidate	Votes	%	±%
Labor	Michael Maher	30,483	49.4	−1.1
Liberal	Geoffrey Howe	26,812	43.5	−0.4
Democrats	Kent Buncombe	4,400	7.1	+4.0
Total formal votes		61,695	92.3	
Informal votes		5,118	7.7	
Turnout		66,813	93.6	
Two-party-preferred result
Labor	Michael Maher	32,215	52.2	−2.3
Liberal	Geoffrey Howe	29,472	47.8	+2.3
Labor hold		Swing	−2.3	

==== 1983 ====
1983 Australian federal election: Lowe
Party	Candidate	Votes	%	±%
Labor	Michael Maher	33,619	51.8	+5.4
Liberal	Philip Taylor	27,633	42.6	−6.1
Democrats	Ralph Rogers	2,030	3.1	+0.1
Socialist Workers	Helen Jarvis	1,572	2.4	+2.4
Total formal votes		64,854	97.3	
Informal votes		1,767	2.7	
Turnout		66,621	95.9	
Two-party-preferred result
Labor	Michael Maher		55.9	+7.0
Liberal	Philip Taylor		44.1	−7.0
Labor hold		Swing	+7.0	

==== 1982 by-election ====
1982 Lowe by-election
Party	Candidate	Votes	%	±%
Labor	Michael Maher	32,717	53.4	+7.0
Liberal	Philip Taylor	23,637	38.6	−10.1
Democrats	Stephen Kirkham	2,495	4.1	+1.1
Independent	Maddalena Gustin	729	1.2	+1.2
Independent	Katherine Wentworth	462	0.8	+0.8
Independent	Charles Bellchambers	460	0.8	+0.8
Republican	Peter Consandine	405	0.7	+0.7
Independent	Maggie Lee	144	0.2	+0.2
Independent	Robert Cameron	116	0.2	+0.2
Independent	John Penninger	56	0.1	+0.1
Independent	Frederick Martin	49	0.1	+0.1
Independent	Robert Webeck	27	0.0	+0.0
Total formal votes		61,297	96.7	−0.4
Informal votes		2,091	3.3	+0.4
Turnout		63,388	89.1	−3.6
Two-party-preferred result
Labor	Michael Maher		58.3	+9.4
Liberal	Philip Taylor		41.7	−9.4
Labor gain from Liberal		Swing	+9.4	

Sir William McMahon (Liberal) resigned.

==== 1980 ====
1980 Australian federal election: Lowe
Party	Candidate	Votes	%	±%
Liberal	Sir William McMahon	31,892	48.7	−4.1
Labor	Jan Burnswoods	30,379	46.4	+7.2
Democrats	Bradley Mulligan	1,987	3.0	−2.7
Independent	Anthony Reasha	1,167	1.8	+1.8
Total formal votes		65,425	97.1	
Informal votes		1,957	2.9	
Turnout		67,382	92.7	
Two-party-preferred result
Liberal	Sir William McMahon	33,416	51.1	−5.2
Labor	Jan Burnswoods	32,009	48.9	+5.2
Liberal hold		Swing	−5.2	

=== Elections in the 1970s ===
==== 1977 ====
1977 Australian federal election: Lowe
Party	Candidate	Votes	%	±%
Liberal	Sir William McMahon	35,044	52.8	−3.4
Labor	Dick Hall	26,052	39.2	−0.7
Democrats	Frederick Tross	3,764	5.7	+5.7
Independent	Charles Bingle	1,553	2.3	+2.3
Total formal votes		66,413	97.3	
Informal votes		1,840	2.7	
Turnout		68,253	93.5	
Two-party-preferred result
Liberal	Sir William McMahon		56.3	−1.6
Labor	Dick Hall		43.7	+1.6
Liberal hold		Swing	−1.6	

==== 1975 ====
1975 Australian federal election: Lowe
Party	Candidate	Votes	%	±%
Liberal	William McMahon	32,908	57.3	+5.8
Labor	Robert Hyde	22,299	38.8	−4.9
Australia	Clifford Bros	1,039	1.8	−0.1
Workers	Andris Kichno	626	1.1	+1.1
Independent	Ben Doig	362	0.6	+0.6
Independent	Bent Poulsen	168	0.3	+0.3
Total formal votes		57,402	97.9	
Informal votes		1,231	2.1	
Turnout		58,633	94.4	
Two-party-preferred result
Liberal	William McMahon		59.0	+5.3
Labor	Robert Hyde		41.0	−5.3
Liberal hold		Swing	+5.3	

==== 1974 ====
1974 Australian federal election: Lowe
Party	Candidate	Votes	%	±%
Liberal	William McMahon	29,110	51.5	+2.8
Labor	Doug Sutherland	24,697	43.7	+0.8
Independent	Bronte Douglas	1,578	2.8	+2.8
Australia	Bent Poulsen	1,088	1.9	−1.6
Total formal votes		56,473	97.8	
Informal votes		1,241	2.2	
Turnout		57,714	94.6	
Two-party-preferred result
Liberal	William McMahon		54.2	+1.2
Labor	Doug Sutherland		45.8	−1.2
Liberal hold		Swing	+1.2	

==== 1972 ====
1972 Australian federal election: Lowe
Party	Candidate	Votes	%	±%
Liberal	William McMahon	25,971	48.7	+0.5
Labor	Bill Fisher	22,879	42.9	+1.8
Australia	John Steele	1,892	3.5	+3.5
Democratic Labor	Agnes Bannon	1,378	2.6	−0.2
Defence of Government Schools	Kathleen Taylor	545	1.0	+1.0
Independent	Marc Aussie-Stone	312	0.6	+0.6
Independent	David Widdup	207	0.4	+0.4
Independent	John Morgan	87	0.2	+0.2
Independent	Sandor Torzsok	33	0.1	+0.1
Total formal votes		53,304	97.1	
Informal votes		1,578	2.9	
Turnout		54,882	93.5	
Two-party-preferred result
Liberal	William McMahon		53.0	−1.9
Labor	Bill Fisher		47.0	+1.9
Liberal hold		Swing	−1.9	

=== Elections in the 1960s ===
==== 1969 ====
1969 Australian federal election: Lowe
Party	Candidate	Votes	%	±%
Liberal	William McMahon	25,317	48.2	−12.0
Labor	Peter Young	21,586	41.1	+8.4
Independent	Patricia Bailey	2,417	4.6	+4.6
Independent	Bernard MacMahon	1,700	3.2	+3.2
Democratic Labor	Agnes Bannon	1,490	2.8	−0.3
Total formal votes		52,510	97.2	
Informal votes		1,534	2.8	
Turnout		54,044	94.0	
Two-party-preferred result
Liberal	William McMahon		54.9	−9.1
Labor	Peter Young		45.1	+9.1
Liberal hold		Swing	−9.1	

==== 1966 ====
1966 Australian federal election: Lowe
Party	Candidate	Votes	%	±%
Liberal	William McMahon	21,595	58.5	+2.9
Labor	Peter Dunn	12,687	34.4	−5.1
Liberal Reform Group	Francis James	1,485	4.0	+4.0
Democratic Labor	Anthony Rooney	1,147	3.1	−1.8
Total formal votes		36,914	97.5	
Informal votes		958	2.5	
Turnout		37,872	94.7	
Two-party-preferred result
Liberal	William McMahon		62.3	+2.8
Labor	Peter Dunn		37.7	−2.8
Liberal hold		Swing	+2.8	

==== 1963 ====
1963 Australian federal election: Lowe
Party	Candidate	Votes	%	±%
Liberal	William McMahon	21,714	55.6	+7.8
Labor	John Holland	15,426	39.5	−7.8
Democratic Labor	Reginald Lawson	1,910	4.9	+1.0
Total formal votes		39,050	98.8	
Informal votes		483	1.2	
Turnout		39,533	94.8	
Two-party-preferred result
Liberal	William McMahon		59.5	+8.6
Labor	John Holland		40.5	−8.6
Liberal hold		Swing	+8.6	

==== 1961 ====
1961 Australian federal election: Lowe
Party	Candidate	Votes	%	±%
Liberal	William McMahon	18,472	47.8	−7.8
Labor	John Holland	18,285	47.3	+12.1
Democratic Labor	Denis Klein	1,846	3.8	−5.4
Republican	Daniel Smith	396	1.0	+1.0
Total formal votes		38,639	97.4	
Informal votes		1,035	2.6	
Turnout		39,674	94.8	
Two-party-preferred result
Liberal	William McMahon	19,660	50.9	−12.3
Labor	John Holland	18,979	49.1	+12.3
Liberal hold		Swing	−12.3	

=== Elections in the 1950s ===
==== 1958 ====
1958 Australian federal election: Lowe
Party	Candidate	Votes	%	±%
Liberal	William McMahon	22,239	55.6	−4.7
Labor	Joseph Sloss	14,086	35.2	−4.5
Democratic Labor	Mollie Dolan	3,669	9.2	+9.2
Total formal votes		39,994	97.3	
Informal votes		1,101	2.7	
Turnout		41,095	94.9	
Two-party-preferred result
Liberal	William McMahon		63.2	+2.9
Labor	Joseph Sloss		36.8	−2.9
Liberal hold		Swing	+2.9	

==== 1955 ====
1955 Australian federal election: Lowe
Party	Candidate	Votes	%	±%
Liberal	William McMahon	25,080	60.3	+3.8
Labor	Edward Davies	16,508	39.7	−3.8
Total formal votes		41,588	97.2	
Informal votes		1,219	2.8	
Turnout		42,807	96.0	
Liberal hold		Swing	+3.8	

==== 1954 ====
1954 Australian federal election: Lowe
Party	Candidate	Votes	%	±%
Liberal	William McMahon	21,380	57.8	+0.0
Labor	William Webster	15,602	42.2	+0.0
Total formal votes		36,982	98.8	
Informal votes		449	1.2	
Turnout		37,431	96.6	
Liberal hold		Swing	+0.0	

==== 1951 ====
1951 Australian federal election: Lowe
Party	Candidate	Votes	%	±%
Liberal	William McMahon	22,276	57.8	+5.1
Labor	John Burton	16,250	42.2	+1.3
Total formal votes		38,526	98.7	
Informal votes		521	1.3	
Turnout		39,047	97.0	
Liberal hold		Swing	−0.7	

=== Elections in the 1940s ===
==== 1949 ====
1949 Australian federal election: Lowe
Party	Candidate	Votes	%	±%
Liberal	William McMahon	20,489	52.7	+3.8
Labor	Hector McDonald	15,908	40.9	−8.0
Independent Liberal	Edith Shortland	2,470	6.4	+6.4
Total formal votes		38,867	98.0	
Informal votes		786	2.0	
Turnout		39,653	97.5	
Two-party-preferred result
Liberal	William McMahon		58.5	+9.0
Labor	Hector McDonald		41.5	−9.0
Liberal notional gain from Labor		Swing	+9.0	
