= Gietzelt =

Gietzelt is a surname. Notable people with the surname include:

- Arthur Gietzelt (1920–2014), Australian politician
- Ray Gietzelt (1922–2012), Australian trade unionist
