= Angela Pippos =

Australian journalist

- Born: Angela Athena Pippos; 29 December 1969 (age 56); Adelaide, South Australia

Angela Athena Pippos (born 29 December 1969), is an Australian journalist, television/radio presenter, author, MC and public speaker, of Greek heritage.

== Biography ==
Pippos completed an Honours degree in Politics at the University of Adelaide and began her career as a researcher and reporter with ABC Television in her hometown of Adelaide. After three years, she was lured across to ABC television news in Melbourne in 1997, even though the sports reporting position did not fit in with her plans of becoming a political journalist. Within a few months she was presenting the sports segment at the ABC News Victoria desk on weekends and then was promoted to weeknights alongside Ian Henderson. She has also been a guest presenter on ABC Radio Melbourne, as well as a columnist and feature writer for the AFL Website and the Sunday Age.

In October 2007, after nearly 14 years, Pippos resigned from the ABC.

Pippos is the author of The Goddess Advantage – One Year in the Life of a Football Worshipper—her diary of the 2005 AFL season from her perspective as an Adelaide Crows supporter—which was published in 2006 by Text Publishing. Her second book, Breaking the Mould – Taking a Hammer to Sexism in Sport was published in February 2017 by Affirm Press.

Pippos was asked by the Australian Labor Party to stand for the Victorian seat of Williamstown, vacated by former Premier Steve Bracks in 2007, but she turned it down.

In 2021, Pippos nominated her friend Zoe Daniel to run as a community independent candidate for the Division of Goldstein through the Voices of Goldstein. Following Daniel's success at the 2022 Australian federal election Pippos joined Daniel's staff as a political advisor alongside Jim Middleton.

== Radio work ==
For just over two years, in 2008 and 2009, Pippos co-hosted the Sport 927 radio breakfast program with 1990 AFL premiership player Michael Christian. It was the first time Sport 927 had had a male and female breakfast partnership on the radio station.

Since 2010, Pippos has had a weekly (Thursday) spot called The Pippos Report on Denis Walter's 3AW radio program, as a social commentator.

== Personal life ==
On 28 January 2013, Pippos gave birth to a boy. He is the first child for Pippos and her partner Simon.

In 2011 Pippos, a well-known supporter of the club, was made an Ambassador of the Adelaide Football Club.

== Community work ==
Pippos is a Patron of the National Jockeys Trust which provides financial support to jockeys and their families in the event of serious injury, illness or death.

Pippos has been an ambassador for Responsible Gambling Awareness Week for a number of years.

== Bibliography ==
- 2006: The Goddess Advantage – One Year in the Life of a Football Worshipper (ISBN 9781921145155)
- 2017: Breaking the Mould – Taking a Hammer to Sexism in Sport (ISBN 9781925344585)
