= Bakery Employees' and Salesmen's Federation of Australia =

Former Australian trade union

- Bakery Employees' and Salesmen's Federation of Australia
- Abbreviation: BESFA
- Merged into: Australian Liquor, Hospitality and Miscellaneous Workers' Union
- Formation: 1905
- Dissolved: 1995
- Type: Trade union
- Location: Australia
- Fields: Baking industry
- Publication: The Bakery and the Breadcarter; Bread Industry Employees' Quarterly Review
- Formerly called: Bread Carters' Industrial Federal Union of Australia (1905 to 1916); Bread Carters' Industrial Federation of Australia (1916 to 1979)

The Bakery Employees' and Salesmen's Federation of Australia (BESFA) was an Australian trade union covering workers in the baking industry. It was registered under that name in 1979, following the earlier registration of the Bread Carters' Industrial Federal Union of Australia in 1905 and its later operation as the Bread Carters' Industrial Federation of Australia. BESFA also received members from the Baking Trade Employees' Federation of Australia after that union was deregistered in 1981.

The union represented bakers, pastrycooks, bread carters, bakery sales staff and other workers connected with bread production and distribution. In 1995, it amalgamated with the Australian Liquor, Hospitality and Miscellaneous Workers' Union, later known as United Voice, a predecessor of the United Workers Union.

== History ==
=== Predecessor unions ===
The federal registration lineage of BESFA began with the Bread Carters' Industrial Federal Union of Australia, which was registered under the Commonwealth industrial system on 6 July 1905. In 1916, the organisation became the Bread Carters' Industrial Federation of Australia.

A separate federal baking trades organisation, the Baking Trades Employees' Federation of Australasia, was registered in 1914. It was deregistered in 1918, later reformed, and by 1950 was known as the Baking Trades Employees' Federation of Australia. After the Baking Trade Employees' Federation of Australia was deregistered in 1981, its members were accepted into BESFA.

Due to the influx of members the Bread Carters' Industrial Federation of Australia officially changed its name to The Bakery Employees' and Salesmen's Federation of Australia was registered in 1979. The organisation continued the federal bread carters' registration line while also taking in members from the baking trades federation.

=== Early bakery union activity ===
Bakery unions in Australia were active before the formation of BESFA under its final name. Norman Jeffery's history of the New South Wales Operative Bakers Society described the early organisation of bakers in New South Wales, including the use of public fair lists and black lists and the development of union organisation before federation.

In 1907, a strike by Melbourne bakers attracted interstate press coverage. The Advertiser reported that about 350 unionists were on strike and that union officials were involved in attempts to arrange alternative bread supply through cooperative bakery production.

In 1911, the Barrier Miner reported negotiations between bread carters and master bakers over a new agreement.

In 1916, the Daily Telegraph reported a planned strike by Victorian bread carters, while stating that bread would still be delivered to military camps, hospitals and charitable institutions. Labour historian William Eather linked wartime rural and industrial mobilisation to disputes that affected flour and bread production in Victoria during the same period.

=== Day baking and night baking ===
The campaign against night baking was an industrial issue for baking workers. Labour historian Carol Corless described the day baking dispute in Queensland as involving public campaigning, litigation and industrial regulation over the timing of bakery work.

In 1919, press coverage of the night baking issue reported threatened strike action and judicial consideration of whether night work was compulsory. In 1923, The Register reported that the Breadcarters' Union had issued an ultimatum to master bakers during a dispute over bread delivery conditions.

== Industrial disputes and award proceedings ==
=== Bread supply and public regulation ===
Bread production and distribution were the subject of public and official regulation. The New South Wales Parliament appointed a Royal Commission on the Price of Bread in the early 1930s, reflecting public and political scrutiny of the industry.

State industrial publications also recorded baking and bread carter matters. The New South Wales Industrial Gazette for 1919 and 1920 included official industrial material concerning bread carters and baking work. The Industrial Arbitration Reports and Records, New South Wales also included material on operative bakers and working conditions. In South Australia, industrial report literature included the 1942 BreadCarters Annual Leave Case.

=== Sydney bread strikes ===
During the 1940s, bakery disputes received press attention because of their effect on bread supply. In July 1943, The Sydney Morning Herald reported that a mass meeting of operative bakers had voted for strike action against hours fixed by a Full Industrial Commission award.

In November 1947, press reports described a strike by Sydney bakers that disrupted bread supply across the city. The dispute also involved bread carters. The Newcastle Morning Herald and Miners' Advocate reported that Sydney bread carters refused to stop work despite instructions from the Labour Council. The same newspaper reported the partial resumption of baking in Maitland several days later. Newcastle Libraries' 1947 newspaper index records a series of bread strike entries from late October to mid November, including items on bakers, bread carters, Maitland, Sydney and Trades Hall involvement.

=== Canberra bakery disputes ===
In December 1964, a strike at Canberra's Tip Top Bakery began after the dismissal of T. Kerr, president of the A.C.T. branch of the Bakery Employees' Union. Kerr was dismissed after refusing a managerial order concerning the quantity of bread rolls to be baked.

The Canberra Times described Kerr as the "undisputed leader of the industry" and reported that he had the backing of the A.C.T. Trades and Labour Council. Kerr said he was being victimised because of his union activity, and the secretary of the Trades and Labour Council, M. Tully, said after investigating the dispute that it appeared to be a case of victimisation. The council's disputes committee was expected to consider further action, including action that could affect flour and other bread ingredient supplies to the Australian Capital Territory.

The strike disrupted production at Tip Top. The factory's general manager, assisted by two staff members and an occasional bread room worker, attempted to maintain part of Canberra's bread supply, with the newspaper reporting that the small workforce had to stop machinery repeatedly and discard dough while attempting to keep up with production. Bakers at Sunicrust Bakery held a stop work meeting and supported the strike. They issued an ultimatum that they would strike unless Kerr was reinstated. The two bakeries supplied about two thirds of Canberra's bread, and the newspaper reported that stoppages at both would produce a bread shortage.

Later that month, a second strike was averted when Kerr urged members to delay action over the Christmas period and instead issue an ultimatum demanding his reinstatement. The Canberra Times reported that Kerr then resigned as union president but was elected part time secretary organiser, with members agreeing to a levy to pay his wages.

=== Later BESFA proceedings ===
In March 1982, The Canberra Times listed a BESFA application to vary the Bakers Award in the Australian Capital Territory in relation to the Canberra Day holiday. In January 1983, BESFA applied in the ACT industrial jurisdiction for a new award covering pastrycooks.

In 1989, the Tasmanian branch of BESFA pursued a dispute against Nu Bake Bakery in Launceston over the alleged underpayment of annual leave. The Tasmanian Industrial Commission later found that the worker had been underpaid. A related 1989 Tasmanian Industrial Commission decision concerned interpretation of the Bakers Award.

In 1992, BESFA was involved in proceedings before the Australian Industrial Relations Commission concerning organisational coverage in the distribution and sale of bread in Victoria.

== Publications and records ==
Records of the union and its predecessors are held in several Australian labour history collections. The University of Melbourne Archives holds BESFA records from 1965 to 1982, including rules, industrial reports, Victorian State Council minutes, correspondence, wage board material, a log of claims, an industrial handbook, The Bakery and the Breadcarter, a BESFA newsletter and Bread Industry Employees' Quarterly Review.

The Noel Butlin Archives Centre holds records of the Baking Trades Employees' Federation of Australia, New South Wales Branch, dating from 1882 to 1947, including minutes, membership records, financial records, awards, arbitration records, newspaper cuttings, photographs and printed material. It also holds records of the Bread Carters' Industrial Federation of Australia, Victorian Branch, dating from 1916 to 1955.

The Noel Butlin Archives Centre also holds records of the Liquor Hospitality and Miscellaneous Workers' Union National Office, including material from 1978 to 1998 relating to disputes, agreements and awards.

== Amalgamation ==
In 1995, BESFA amalgamated with the Australian Liquor, Hospitality and Miscellaneous Workers' Union. The LHMU later became United Voice and in 2019 merged with the National Union of Workers to form the United Workers Union.
