= Federated Miscellaneous Workers' Union of Australia =

Trade union

Federated Miscellaneous Workers' Union
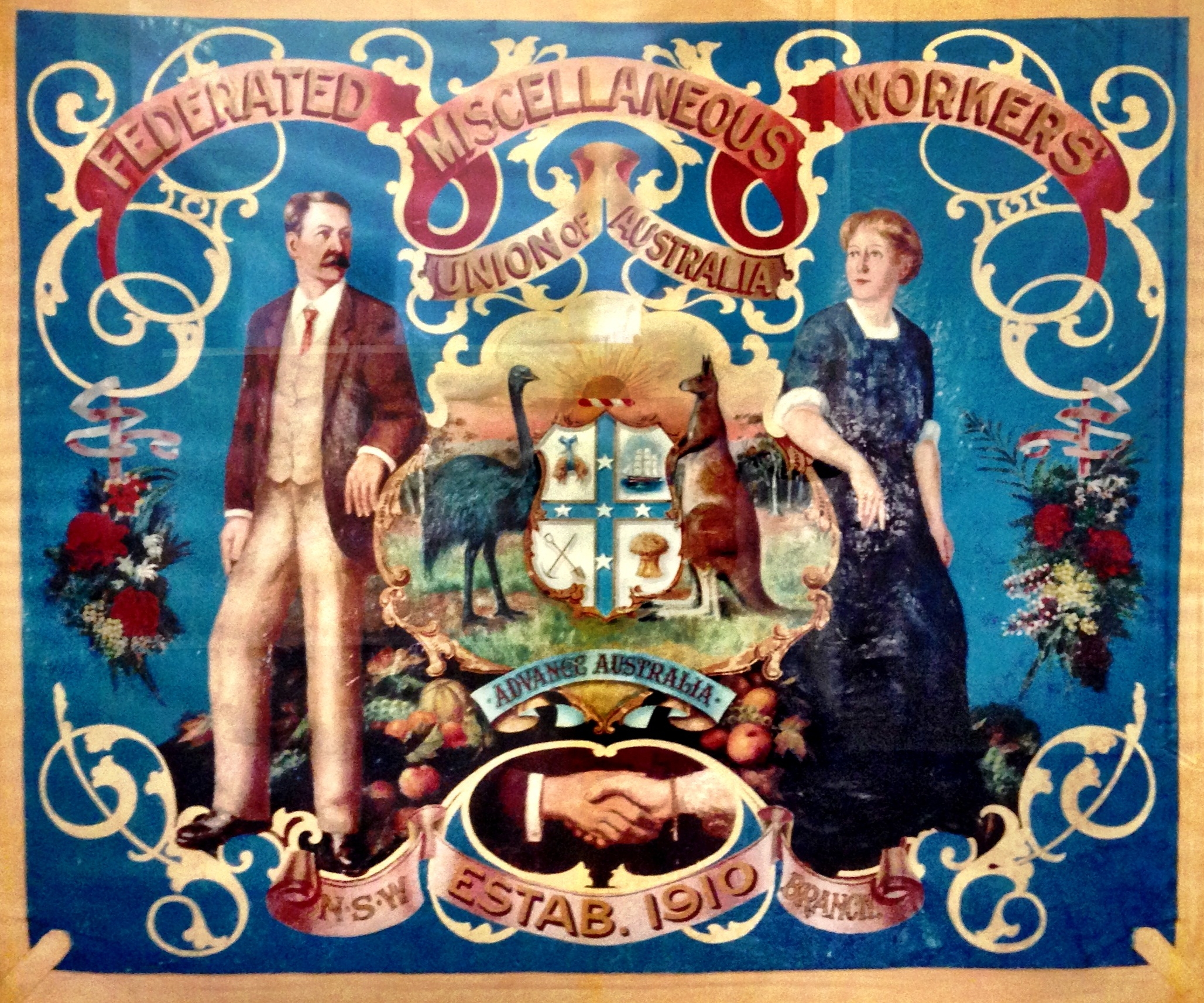
- An early banner of the FMWU
- Merged into: Liquor Hospitality and Miscellaneous Workers' Union
- Founded: 15 December 1915
- Dissolved: 1992
- Headquarters: Labor Council Building, 377 Sussex Street, Sydney, NSW
- Location: Australia
- Members: 95,000 (1976)
- Key people: Martin Ferguson (General Secretary), Jim McGinty (Secretary), Jeff Lawrence (General Secretary), Sid O'Flaherty (Secretary), Fred Katz (General Secretary)
- Affiliations: ACTU, ALP, Association of International Disarmament, International Chemical Federation, General Workers Federation

The Federated Miscellaneous Workers' Union (FMWU commonly known as the 'Missos') was an Australian trade union from 1915 to 1992. It represented an extremely diverse and disparate range of occupations, but its core support came from workers employed in cleaning and security services. The union merged with the Federated Liquor and Allied Industries Employees' Union of Australia to form United Voice in 1992.

== Formation ==
The union was first established on 6 May 1910 as the Watchmen, Caretakers and Cleaners Union of New South Wales (WCCU), which was created by the Organising Committee of the New South Wales Labor Council. The task of organisation was a difficult one due to the casualised and isolated nature of the occupations covered. Under the leadership of the first Secretary of the WCCU, Joe Coote, the union adopted a pragmatic approach to increasing union membership by including any workers not already represented by trade unions, such as paintmaking employees. To reflect the growing range of industries represented in 1915 the union changed its name to the Federated Miscellaneous Workers' Union.

== Growth ==
After steady growth over the first half of the century, including winning paid sick leave, annual leave and a forty-hour week, the union really took off in the 1950s. A new rank-and-file leadership led by Ray Gietzelt took over to create a vibrant, member-driven union.

Famous campaigns during the 1950s and 60s included organising workers paid to be Santa Clauses at Christmas and a group of dance instructors who were locked out for four months before winning their jobs back. In the late 1960s the FMWU absorbed the membership of the defunct Australian Leather and Allied Trades Employees' Federation.

The strength of the "Missos" grew over these years, with membership increasing from 25,000 in 1955 to 88,000 by 1975. Ray Gietzelt remained General Secretary from 1955 to 1984.

== Amalgamation ==
In 1992 the FMWU amalgamated with the Federated Liquor and Allied Industries Employees' Union of Australia to form the Liquor Hospitality and Miscellaneous Workers' Union (LHMU), later renamed United Voice.

In 2019 United Voice merged with the National Union of Workers (NUW) to form the United Workers Union (UWU). Now the largest private-sector union in Australia.
