= John MacBean =

Australian trade union leader (1935–2024)

John William MacBean AM (11 July 1935 – 26 May 2024) was an Australian trade union leader and Secretary of the Labor Council of New South Wales from 1984 to 1988.

== Early life ==
John MacBean was born in Newcastle, New South Wales on 11 July 1935, the son of Jack and Eileen MacBean. His father was a first aid attendant at the Broadmeadow locomotive workshops and later vice-president of the state branch of the Australian Railways Union. He left school at 15 to take up an apprenticeship with the Newcastle Electricity Supply Council Administration as an electrical fitter.

== Career ==
After completing his apprenticeship, MacBean became a delegate for the Electrical Trades Union, later becoming an organiser in 1964. He was also a member of the Adamstown branch of the Australian Labor Party (ALP) and a Newcastle city councillor. In 1972 he was appointed as industrial officer at the Labor Council of New South Wales, the peak representative body for trade unions in the state, and then elected as an organiser in 1975.

MacBean was a member of the right wing of the labour movement and was supported by the Secretary of the Labor Council, Barrie Unsworth, who was also from the right. In 1979 MacBean was elected Assistant Secretary of the Labor Council and then Secretary in 1984. He would continue to hold the position of Secretary until 1988. During this period he adopted a more conciliatory approach towards the left-wing unions than his predecessor, Unsworth.

He also served as president of the NSW branch of the ALP from 1983 to 1989, as well as senior vice-president of the Australian Council of Trade Unions from 1985 to 1989.

MacBean died from complications of Parkinson's disease on 26 May 2024, at the age of 88.

Trade union offices
Preceded by Barrie Unsworth	Secretary of the Labor Council of New South Wales; 1984–1989	Succeeded by Michael Easson
