= Gary Bullock (trade unionist) =

Australian trade unionist

National Secretary of United Workers Union
- Incumbent
- Assumed office 27 July 2026
- President: Lyndal Ryan
- Preceded by: Tim Kennedy

National Vice President of United Workers Union
- In office 11 November 2019 – 27 July 2026
- President: Jo-Anne Schofield
- Preceded by: Position established
- Succeeded by: Carolyn Smith, Demi Pnevmatikos, Helen Gibbons, Pat O'Donnell

National President of United Voice
- In office 2007–2019
- Preceded by: Brian Daley
- Succeeded by: Position abolished

General Secretary of United Voice Queensland
- In office 2007–2019
- President: Carol Corless
- Assistant Secretary: Sharon Caddie; Sheila Hunter
- Preceded by: Ron Monaghan
- Succeeded by: Position abolished

Personal details
- Born: Gary John Bullock
- Party: Labor
- Occupation: Trade unionist
- Nickname: Blocker

Gary John "Blocker" Bullock is an Australian trade unionist who currently serves as the National Secretary of the United Workers Union (UWU), the largest blue collar union in Australia.

He previously served as the National President and Queensland branch General Secretary of United Voice prior to its merger with the National Union of Workers to form UWU in 2019. He also serves as an elected left faction member of the Australian Labor Party National Executive and has been described as "the most powerful man in Queensland" and a Queensland Labor "Kingmaker." Critics have described him as a "factional warlord."

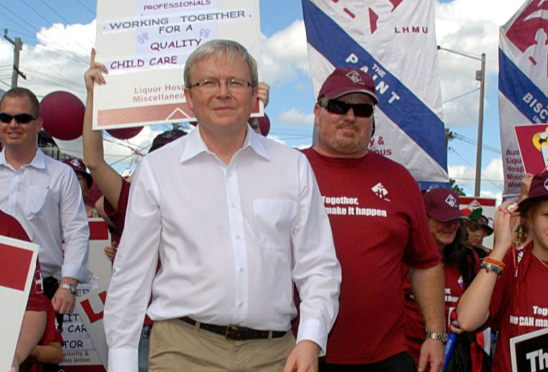
Bullock (right) alongside prime minister Kevin Rudd (left) at the Labour Day March in Brisbane, 2010

Bullock has also served as Employee Director and Deputy Co-chair of the board at Superannuation fund Hostplus since 2021. He previously served as a Director of InTrust Super from 2004 to 2021, serving as chair from 2016 until his departure.

== See also ==
- Australian Council of Trade Unions
- Queensland Council of Unions
