= Unions ACT =

Representative body of trade union organisations in the Australian Capital Territory

- Formation: 16th of April 1931; 93 years ago
- Headquarters: Dickson, Australian Capital Territory
- Location: Australia
- Members: 33,000 from affiliated unions
- Secretary: Kasey Tomkins
- President: Maddy Northam
- Affiliations: ACTU
- Website: unionsact.org.au

The Trades and Labour Council of the Australian Capital Territory, which operates under the name UnionsACT, is the Labour council of trade union organisations in the Australian Capital Territory (ACT).

It comprises 22 affiliated trade unions and represents over 33,000 unionised workers in the ACT. It is an affiliate of the Australian Council of Trade Unions (ACTU).

== History ==
UnionsACT was founded on the 16th of April 1931 as the Trades and Labour Council of the Federal Capital Territory. The founding unions of UnionsACT were the Australian Workers' Union, the Federated Clerks Union, the Operative Plasterers Federation, the Amalgamated Society of Carpenters and Joiners, the Operative Painters and Decorators Union, the Electrical Trades Union of Australia, the Plumbers and Gasfitters Employees Union, the Federated Liquour and Allied Trades Employees Union, the Slaters, Tilers, and Shingers, Union and the Australian Society of Engineers.

In 1938 it changed its name to the Trades and Labour Council of the Australian Capital Territory to reflect the change of the name of the Territory before adopting UnionsACT as its operational name in 2002 whilst retaining the formal full name.

== Responsibilities & Operations ==
As the Labour council & peak body for trade unions in the ACT region UnionsACT has broad responsibility to its affiliates in advocating for industrial, social and political justice for ACT workers. This includes through activities such as coordinating union activity and campaigns involving multiple affiliates, providing assistance with political advocacy and acting as a general public point of contact with the trade union movement in the ACT.

UnionsACT also operates public facing outreach activities that aim to improve the general status of workers in the ACT.

=== Young Workers Advice Service ===
The Young Workers Advice Service, originally known as the Young Workers Centre, is the youth arm of UnionsACT. It provides free advice and confidential support to persons under the age of 25 in the ACT about their workplace rights and entitlements, and conducts education outreach to young ACT workers about core workplace topics such as workplace health and safety.

It also undertakes research and advocacy on issues impacting young workers, such as the 2020 report into wage theft of young workers who were employed by businesses located on the Australian National University Acton campus.

=== Injured Workers Service ===
The Injured Workers Service provides advice to workers navigating the Workers' compensation system. Founded in 2021 it provides free advice to workers in the ACT who are undertaking a workers compensation claim.

== See also ==
- Australian Council of Trade Unions
- Unions NSW
- Victorian Trades Hall Council
