= United Voice =

Australian trade union (1992–2019)

- United Voice, Industrial Union of Employees
- Predecessor: FMWU, FLAIEU, BESFA
- Merged into: United Workers Union
- Founded: 1992
- Dissolved: 2019
- Headquarters: 303 Cleveland Street, Redfern, New South Wales
- Location: Australia
- Members: 98,716 (as at 30 June 2019)
- Key people: Jo-Anne Schofield, National Secretary; Gary Bullock, National President; Helen Gibbons, Assistant National Secretary
- Affiliations: ACTU, ALP, IUF
- Formerly called: Liquor, Hospitality and Miscellaneous Union (LHMU) (1992–2011)

United Voice was an Australian trade union from 1992 to 2019. It merged with the National Union of Workers to form the United Workers Union in 2019. United Voice was part of the Labor Left faction of the Australian Labor Party.

The union was established in 1992 as the Liquor, Hospitality and Miscellaneous Union, following the merge of the Federated Miscellaneous Workers' Union of Australia and Federated Liquor and Allied Industries Employees' Union of Australia. In 1995 the Bakery Employees' and Salesmen's Federation of Australia amalgamated into the union.

It was renamed United Voice from 1 March 2011.

== History ==
=== Predecessor ===
United Voice was first established in 1910 as the Watchmen, Caretakers and Cleaners Union of New South Wales (W.C.C.U.), which was created by the Organising Committee of the New South Wales Labor Council. The task of organisation was a difficult one, due to the casualised and isolated nature of the occupations covered. Under the leadership of the first Secretary of the WCCU, Joe Coote, the union adopted a pragmatic approach to increasing union membership, by including any workers not already represented by trade unions, such as paintmaking employees. To reflect the growing range of industries represented, on 15 December 1915 the union amalgamated with the Victorian Branch and changed its name to the Federated Miscellaneous Workers' Union.

After steady growth over the first half of the century, including winning paid sick leave, annual leave and a forty-hour week, the union really took off in the 1950s. A new rank-and-file leadership led by Ray Gietzelt took over to create a vibrant, member-driven union. Famous campaigns during the 1950s and 1960s included organising workers paid to be Santa Clauses at Christmas and a group of dance instructors who were locked out for four months before winning their jobs back.

The strength of the "Missos" continued to grow over the years, with membership increasing from 25,000 in 1955 to 88,000 by 1975.

=== Modern era ===
By the late 1980s, the LHMU had gained a good deal of political power. It benefited from the close links of Ray Gietzelt to Australian Labor Party politicians such as Bob Hawke, Neville Wran, Lionel Murphy and his brother Arthur Gietzelt. Subsequently, though, its fortunes declined. The move of flight catering and aircraft cleaning staff to join the Transport Workers Union in the mid-1990s resulted in the LHMU losing several thousand members. In 1995 the Bakery Employees' and Salesmen's Federation of Australia (BESFA) amalgamated with the union bringing with it coverage of bakers, carters and sales personnel. In 1996 John Howard became Prime Minister, and his government worked to weaken the union movement as a whole, with the result that the LHMU lost further members between 1996 and 2007.

Since Howard's defeat in 2007, nevertheless, the union reported a small but steady growth in numbers, even as the membership of most other Australian unions continued to shrink. Its major campaign on cleaners' behalf, called Clean Start:Fair Deal for Cleaners, was inspired by the successful American campaign called Justice for Janitors.

The strong links with prominent ALP figures continued. Former cabinet ministers Penny Wong and Mark Butler were both LHMU branch officials in South Australia before they entered the federal parliament.

=== Merge ===
In 2018, the union began plans to merge with the National Union of Workers. In June 2019, the Fair Work Commission approved a vote on the proposed merger between the two unions, to be held in August. On 30 August 2019 the Australian Electoral Commission declared the result of the vote, with just over 95% of members supporting the amalgamation. The name of the new union is the United Workers Union. On 11 November 2019, the new United Workers Union was formed.

== Governance and structure ==
United Voice was a federation of state and territory branches. Each branch contributes financially to the national office.

=== National Council ===
The National Council was the highest decision making body in the union. It was made up of delegates from each Branch of the union, and each section within those Branches. Half of National Council's membership was rank and file members. National Council met in August each year. The Executive carries out the decisions of the Council.

=== National Executive ===
The National Executive was the national management committee of United Voice. National Executive met at least twice per year, but usually around four times. Members of National executive were elected to their positions, and there were rules for proper representation of membership sections and gender. The National Secretary were elected officers of the Union who worked as the chief executives and operational managers of the National Union. The National presidents were also elected officers whose role was to chair the Council and Executive meetings.

=== National Secretary ===
Jo-Anne Schofield was the National Secretary of United Voice.

=== State and territory branches ===
Each state and territory had its own branch of the union, with roughly the same structure as the national office. Each branch had a Branch Council and a Branch Executive.

== Affiliations ==
In Australia, United Voice was affiliated with the Australian Labor Party and the Australian Council of Trade Unions. It was also a member of various other not-for-profit organisations such as the Sydney Alliance and SmokeFree Australia.

Internationally, the union was affiliated with the International Union of Food, Agricultural, Hotel, Restaurant, Catering, Tobacco and Allied Workers' Association.

== Current and past campaigns ==
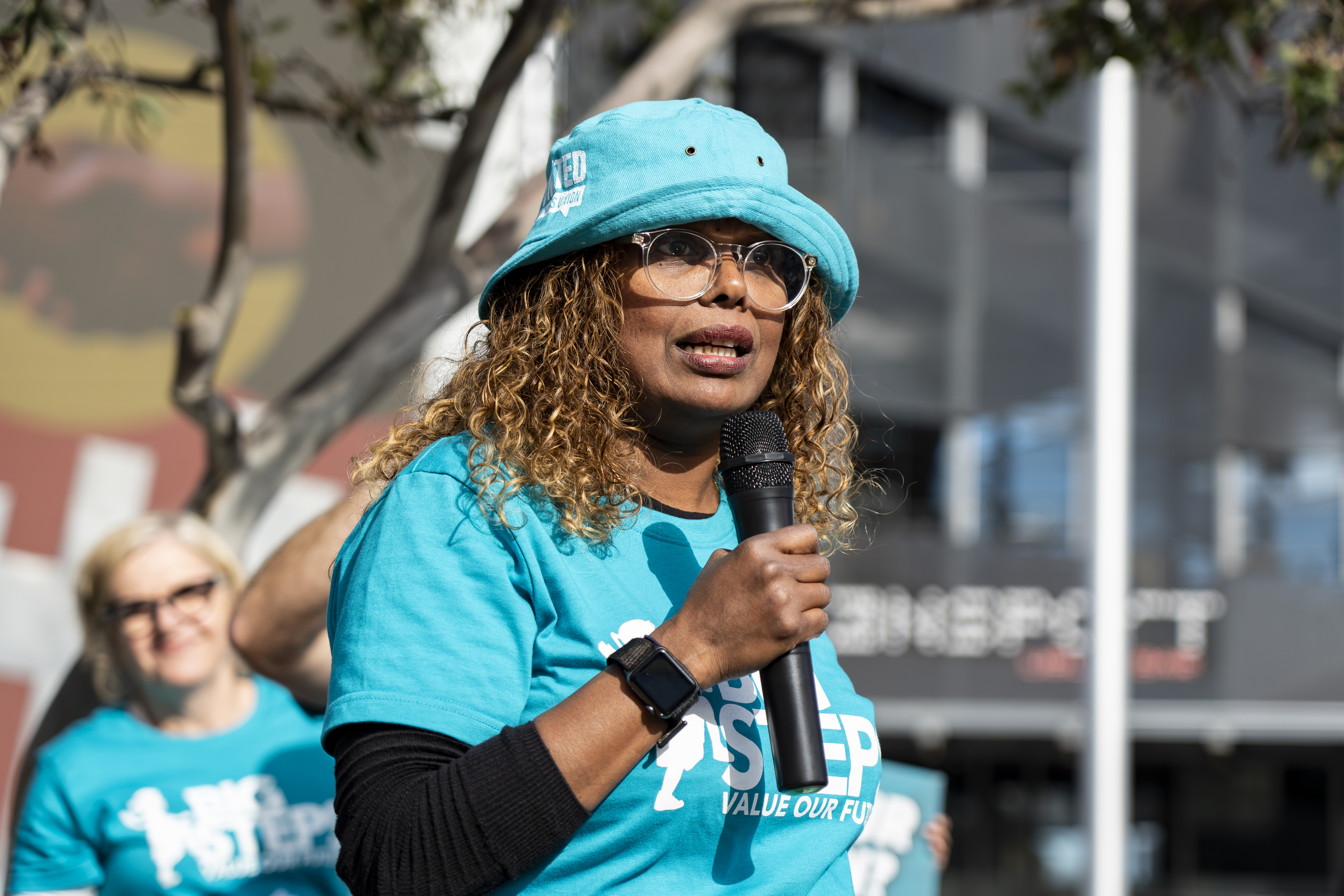
Big Steps Campaign - Early Childhood Educators Stop Work Action, September 2022

Big Steps is a national campaign to increase the wages of child care workers, across the span of early childhood education and care (ECEC). United Voice called on the federal government to give childcare centres A$1.4 billion in extra funding to increase staff wages without increasing fees for parents. They want the average wage to increase from $18.58 an hour to $26.

Clean Start: Fair Deal for Cleaners was launched by United Voice in 2006, to highlight the problems in the CBD office cleaning industry and improve jobs for cleaners. The focus of the campaign was on fair and safe workloads, respect and fair treatment at work, job security, and higher wages.

In September 2011, United Voice joined with many other unions to campaign for marriage equality for same-sex couples. The Unions for Marriage Equality campaign was timed to start a few months before the Labor National Conference in December 2011.

United Voice served on the steering committee for the Responsible Gambling Awareness Week, an annual event that focuses on the promotion of responsible gambling and services that assist people with problem gambling issues throughout Australia.

== Criticism ==
In August 2016, ABC's 7:30 Report "Former United Voice workers accuse the union of hypocrisy" was produced. The Report detailed allegations of mismanagement and bullying Journalist Pat McGrath reported that he had spoken to 15 past and current staff members who alleged that bullying was "rife" in the union, that organisers were put under pressure to reach unattainable targets, and 'counselled out' when they didn't, and that working at the union had taken a mental and physical toll on staff. One staff member claimed he had been stood down after his attempts to negotiate pay and conditions for workers within the union. The union responded that he was stood down due to aggressive behaviour. He was seen reading the book "Spirit Level" on the program, and excerpts of his email asking National Secretary Jo Schofield were screened, showing that he had "respectfully asked" for the creation of a group to represent workers within the union. One staff member was quoted in the program as suffering from physical and mental distress leading to issues such as depression and psoriasis due to the "style of management." They reported that their manager was so strongly supported by senior management that taking any internal action would have led to further anxiety, and they had left the union.

In the three years previous to the program, one claim of bullying and one of unfair dismissal were settled by the union. Union money was used to pay for the settlements.

The union denied the allegations of the 7:30 Report and noted that it did have an agreement with staff. It did not make the agreement, which is not a public document, available to the 7:30 Report. According to the same ABC article referenced above, the union further denied that the organisation had a culture of bullying and additionally denied claims that it refused to negotiate employment conditions with its staff.
