= Responsible Gambling Awareness Week =

Responsible gambling awareness week is held annually in May and focuses on the promotion of responsible gambling and services that assist people with problem gambling issues throughout Australia.

== Events ==
Events for the week are typically organised at a local level and have been hosted and supported by local gambling venues, local councils, problem gambling services, local libraries and educational institutes. Events can include morning tea, lunch, talks from gambling help agencies and former gamblers, giveaways and displays in public spaces.

== Partners ==
A steering committee made up of members of the following organisations helps to guide and support Responsible Gambling Awareness Week:

- Australian Leisure and Hospitality Group
- Community Clubs Association of Victoria
- Crown Melbourne
- Ethnic Communities Council of Victoria
- Gambler's Help Services
- Interchurch Gambling Taskforce
- Primary Care Partnerships
- Tabcorp
- Tatts Group
- Turning Point Alcohol and Drug Centre
- United Voice
- Victorian Commission for Liquor and Gambling Regulation
- VicHealth
- Victorian Local Governance Association
- Victorian Responsible Gambling Foundation

Partners of the Victorian Responsible Gambling Foundation:

- AFL Victoria
- Collingwood Football Club
- Melbourne Victory Football Club
- Netball Victoria
- Kangaroos South Melbourne Football Club

Responsible Gambling Awareness Week supporters:

- Australian Human Resources Institute
- Australian Institute of Family Studies
- Racing Victoria

== Criticism ==
Responsible Gambling Awareness Week has received criticism for being a way to deflect attention from the more pressing issues within the gambling industry, such as the amount of revenue generated from Poker machines. Both Tim Costello, Chairman for the National Churches Gambling Taskforce, and Dr Charles Livingstone, Senior Lecturer in the School of Public Health and Preventive Medicine at Monash University have criticised the week for involving rather than opposing the gambling industry. In 2013, Dr Livingstone pointed out that Responsible Gambling Awareness Week website had provided links that took a user directly to the websites for Tabcorp, Tatts Group and Crown Resorts.
