= Australian Leather and Allied Trades Employees' Federation =

A.L.A.T.E.F.
- Australian Leather and Allied Trades Employees' Federation
- Merged into: Federated Miscellaneous Workers' Union
- Founded: 1945
- Dissolved: 1970
- Location: Australia

The Australian Leather and Allied Trades Employees' Federation (ALATEF) was an Australian trade union that existed between 1945 and 1970. It represented workers employed in the preparation of leather from hides, and the manufacture of a variety of leather and canvas goods.

== Establishment ==
The beginnings of the ALATEF can be traced back to the founding of two organisations, the Australian Saddlery Trades Employees Federation and the Federated Tanners, Curriers and Leather Dressers Employees' Union of Australia. These unions merged in 1918 to form the Australian Saddlery and Leather Workers' Trades Employees' Federation. Following several name changes, including the convoluted "Australian Saddlery, Leather, Sail, Canvas, Tanning, Leather Dressing and Allied Workers' Trades Employees' Federation", the union settled on its final name in 1945.

== Amalgamation ==
The decline of the leather industry in Australia, as well as increased mechanisation, led to a reduced membership, and the union began seeking amalgamation with other unions. Despite approaching several unions in the textile and apparel industries, the union's reputation for militancy and its communist political leanings meant its advances were rebuffed. The union eventually reached an agreement in 1967 to amalgamate with the Federated Miscellaneous Workers' Union, FMWU, and ceased to exist in 1970. The successor to the FMWU, United Voice, continues to provide coverage for leather workers.
