= Federated Liquor and Allied Industries Employees' Union of Australia =

Australian trade union

- Merged into: Liquor Hospitality and Miscellaneous Workers' Union
- Founded: 1910
- Dissolved: 1992
- Headquarters: 13 Monaro House, 3 Lonsdale Street, Braddon, ACT
- Location: Australia
- Members: 85,000 (in 1976)
- Affiliations: ACTU, ALP

The Federated Liquor and Allied Industries Employees' Union of Australia (FLAIEU) was an Australian trade union from 1910 to 1992. It represented workers employed in hospitality, catering, breweries and alcohol retailing. The union merged with the Federated Miscellaneous Workers' Union of Australia to form United Voice in 1992.

== Formation ==
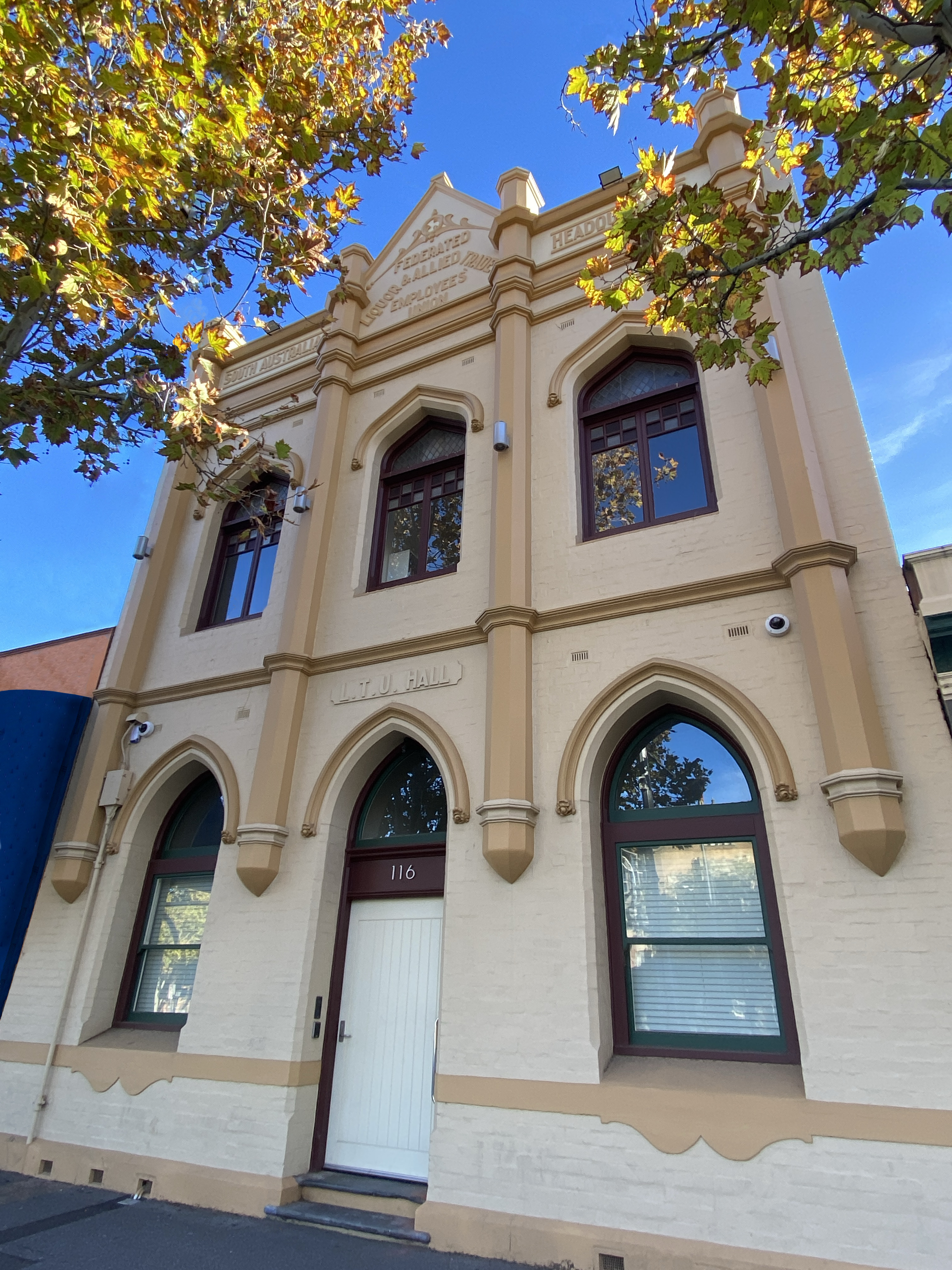
The union's name and "South Australian headquarters" is still emblazoned on this building in Adelaide's Grote Street, built in 1915 as a Seventh-day Adventist mission hall; since 2023 it has been a synagogue

The union was formed when the Victorian Liquor Trades Union merged with other state-based unions representing brewery workers in 1910. The union grew rapidly, incorporating workers from kindred industries, and in 1968 merged with the Hotel Club Restaurant and Caterers' Employees' Union of New South Wales. The New South Wales branch was the largest state branch of the union (with 68 per cent of the union's membership in 1976).

== Amalgamation ==
In 1992 the FLAIEU amalgamated with the Federated Miscellaneous Workers' Union, which primarily represented cleaners and security staff. The resulting body, the Liquor Hospitality and Miscellaneous Workers' Union, had approximately 200,000 members at formation. The Liquor Hospitality and Miscellaneous Workers' Union later changed its name to United Voice.
