= Marise Payne =

Australian politician

The Honourable Marise Payne
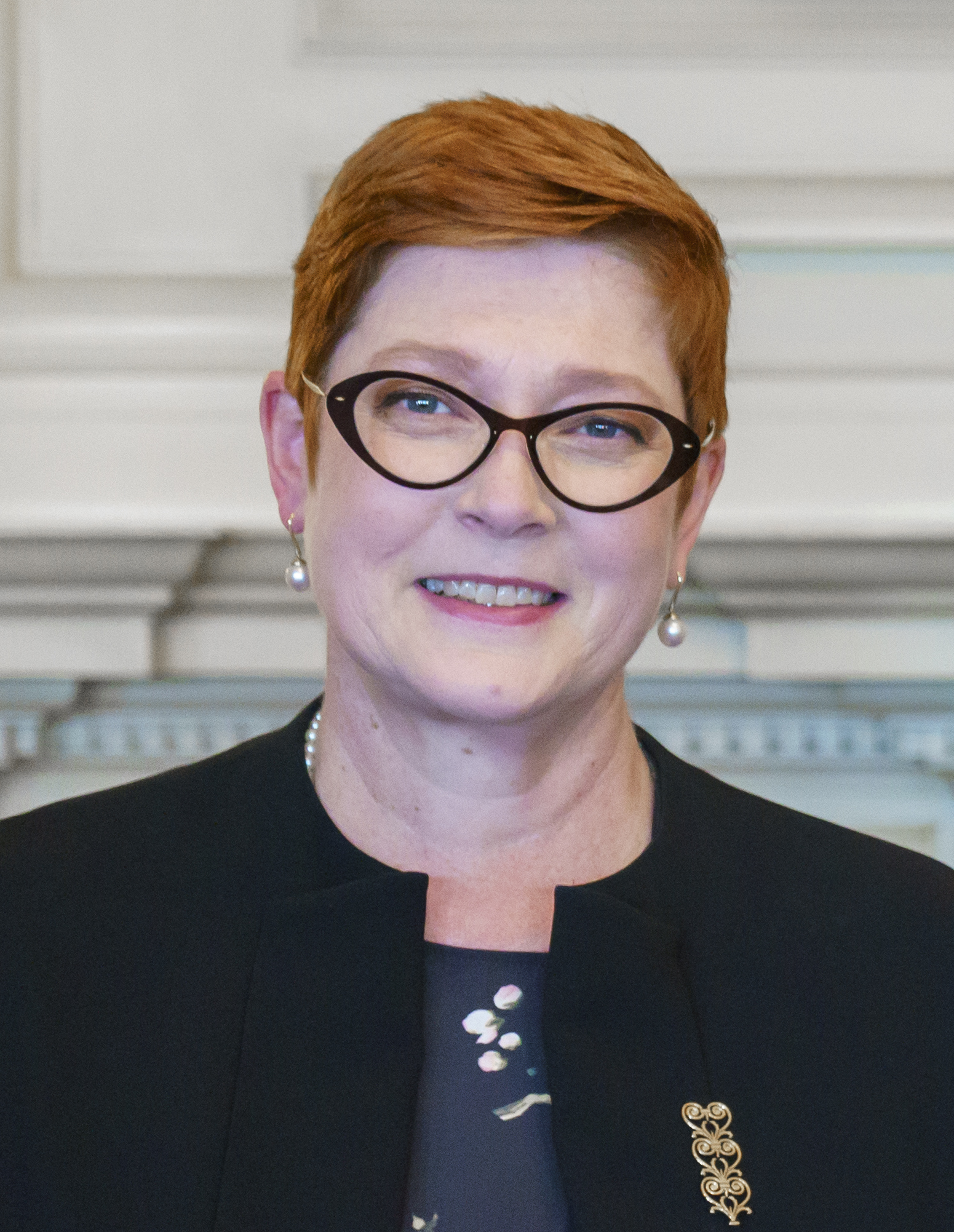

Minister for Foreign Affairs
- In office 28 August 2018 – 23 May 2022
- Prime Minister: Scott Morrison
- Preceded by: Julie Bishop
- Succeeded by: Penny Wong

Minister for Women
- In office 29 May 2019 – 23 May 2022
- Prime Minister: Scott Morrison
- Preceded by: Kelly O'Dwyer
- Succeeded by: Katy Gallagher

Minister for Defence
- In office 21 September 2015 – 28 August 2018
- Prime Minister: Malcolm Turnbull; Scott Morrison
- Preceded by: Kevin Andrews
- Succeeded by: Christopher Pyne

Minister for Human Services
- In office 18 September 2013 – 21 September 2015
- Prime Minister: Tony Abbott; Malcolm Turnbull
- Preceded by: Jan McLucas
- Succeeded by: Stuart Robert

Senator for New South Wales
- In office 9 April 1997 – 30 September 2023
- Preceded by: Bob Woods
- Succeeded by: Dave Sharma

Personal details
- Born: Marise Ann Payne; 29 July 1964 (age 62) Sydney, Australia
- Party: Liberal
- Domestic partner: Stuart Ayres (2007–2024)
- Education: MLC School
- Alma mater: University of New South Wales
- Website: marisepayne.com

Marise Ann Payne (born 29 July 1964) is an Australian politician who was a Senator for New South Wales from 1997 until 2023, representing the Liberal Party. She held senior ministerial office in Coalition governments between 2013 and 2022, including as Minister for Defence (2015–2018) and Minister for Foreign Affairs (2018–2022).

Payne was born in Sydney and attended the University of New South Wales. She was the first woman to serve as federal president of the Young Liberals (1989–1991). Payne was appointed to the Senate in 1997, in place of Bob Woods. She was elected to a full term in 2001, and has since been re-elected four more times. Payne was first added to the shadow ministry in 2007, and when the Coalition returned to power in 2013 she was made Minister for Human Services in the Abbott government. Payne was appointed Minister for Defence when Malcolm Turnbull became prime minister, becoming the first woman to hold the position. After Turnbull was replaced by Scott Morrison in August 2018, it was announced that she would replace Julie Bishop as Minister for Foreign Affairs in the new government, a position she held until the government's defeat in 2022. She is the longest-serving female senator in Australia's history. On 8 September 2023, Payne announced she would resign from the Senate, effective 30 September.

== Early life ==
Payne was born in Sydney, the daughter of Ann Noreen (née Johns) and William Elliott Payne. Her father was a World War II veteran who worked as an accountant and farmer. Payne grew up in Bardwell Park, in Sydney's southern suburbs. She attended MLC School before going on to the University of New South Wales, where she graduated with Bachelor of Arts and Bachelor of Laws degrees. In her second year at university, she was involved in a road accident near Michelago. She was a passenger in a car which rolled over and she received serious injuries to her neck, fracturing her odontoid process.

Payne joined the Liberal Party in 1982, and was state president of the New South Wales Young Liberals from 1987 to 1988. She then served as federal president of the Young Liberals from 1989 to 1991, the first woman to hold the position, and as a member of the state executive of the New South Wales Liberals from 1991 to 1997. In 1991, Payne was an unsuccessful candidate to fill the casual vacancy caused by the resignation of Senator Peter Baume. At the time she was serving as private secretary to Senator Robert Hill.

In 1994, Payne was appointed vice-chair of the Australian Republican Movement, serving under chairman Malcolm Turnbull. At the time, she was working as an adviser to Premier John Fahey and serving on the Liberal Party's state executive. Tony Abbott, who was then the national executive director of Australians for Constitutional Monarchy, criticised her for accepting the position, stating "anyone who does not support constitutional monarchy is at odds with the party". John Howard accused her of a "conflict of interest", stating she had joined "an organisation dominated by Labor sympathisers".

== Senator (1997–2023) ==
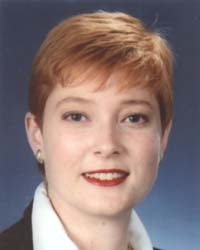
Payne early in her career

Following the resignation of Senator Bob Woods in March 1997, Payne was chosen by the Liberal Party to fill the casual vacancy. She took office on 9 April 1997, and has subsequently been re-elected to the Senate at the 2001, 2007, 2013, 2016 election and 2022 election. Her office is located in Parramatta, in Sydney's western suburbs.

Payne was a backbencher for her first decade in the Senate, from 1997 to 2007. When she took her seat, The Sydney Morning Herald ran a headline describing her as "The Senator John Howard Didn't Want". She was preselected in third place on the Coalition ticket at the 2001 election, with Howard intervening to ensure Helen Coonan ranked ahead of her as the first Liberal candidate. Prior to the 2007 election, members of the Liberal Party's conservative faction attempted to have Payne removed from the ticket. However, for the sake of unity Howard and Bill Heffernan intervened to ensure that she retained a winning place on the Coalition ticket. Payne served on various Senate committees during that time, notably as chair of the Joint Standing Committee on Foreign Affairs, Defence and Trade and the Senate Legal and Constitutional Committee.

Payne was appointed as a shadow parliamentary secretary after the Coalition lost the 2007 election, with responsibility for foreign affairs (2007–2008) and international development assistance and indigenous affairs (2008–2009). When Tony Abbott became Leader of the Opposition in December 2009, she was appointed Shadow Minister for COAG and Modernising the Federation. After the 2010 election, she was instead made Shadow Minister for Housing and Shadow Minister for Indigenous Development and Employment.

=== Abbott government (2013–2015) ===
When the Coalition won the 2013 federal election, Payne was appointed Minister for Human Services in the Abbott government. In March 2014, she announced that Medicare offices would close on Saturdays, as there had been a "60 per cent reduction in walk-ins into Medicare shopfronts on Saturdays". In June 2014, she announced the creation of "myGov hybrid government shopfronts", which are designed to assist customers with setting up online accounts for government services such as Centrelink, Medicare, the Australian Taxation Office, and the National Disability Insurance Scheme.

=== Turnbull government (2015–2018) ===
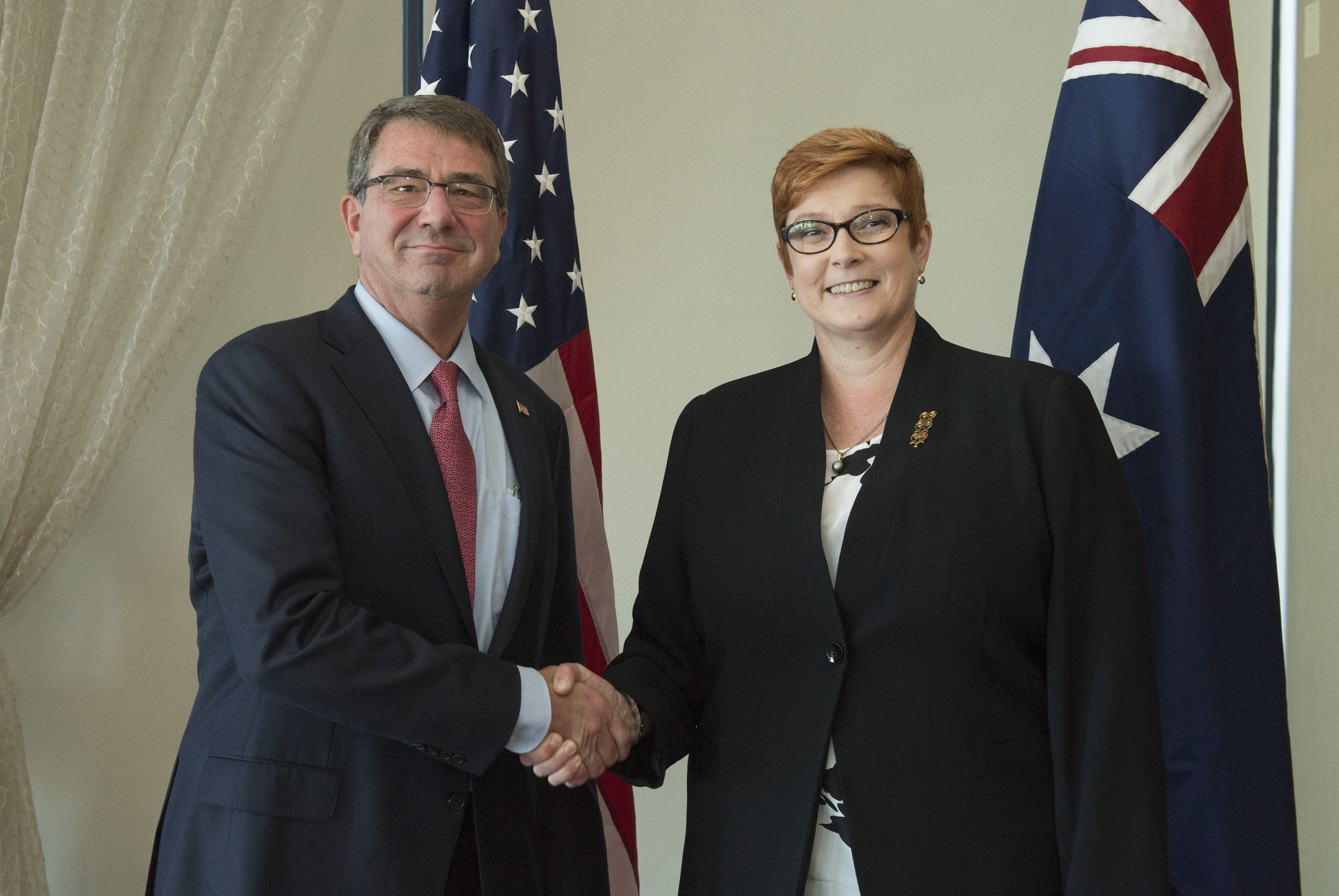
Payne with U.S. Secretary of Defense Ash Carter in October 2015

After Malcolm Turnbull defeated Tony Abbott in a leadership spill, Payne was elevated to the cabinet and appointed Minister for Defence in the Turnbull government from 21 September 2015. She was the first woman to hold the position, which has existed since Federation in 1901. Neil James, the executive director of the Australia Defence Association, welcomed her appointment, stating: "Too many defence ministers have been shoved sideways into this portfolio in the twilight of the parliamentary careers because it's seen as a badge of seniority, and defence suffers. Marise Payne is a politician with a large part of her parliamentary career still ahead of her, and with this appointment, unlike the last few, there's more to be optimistic about than to be pessimistic about."

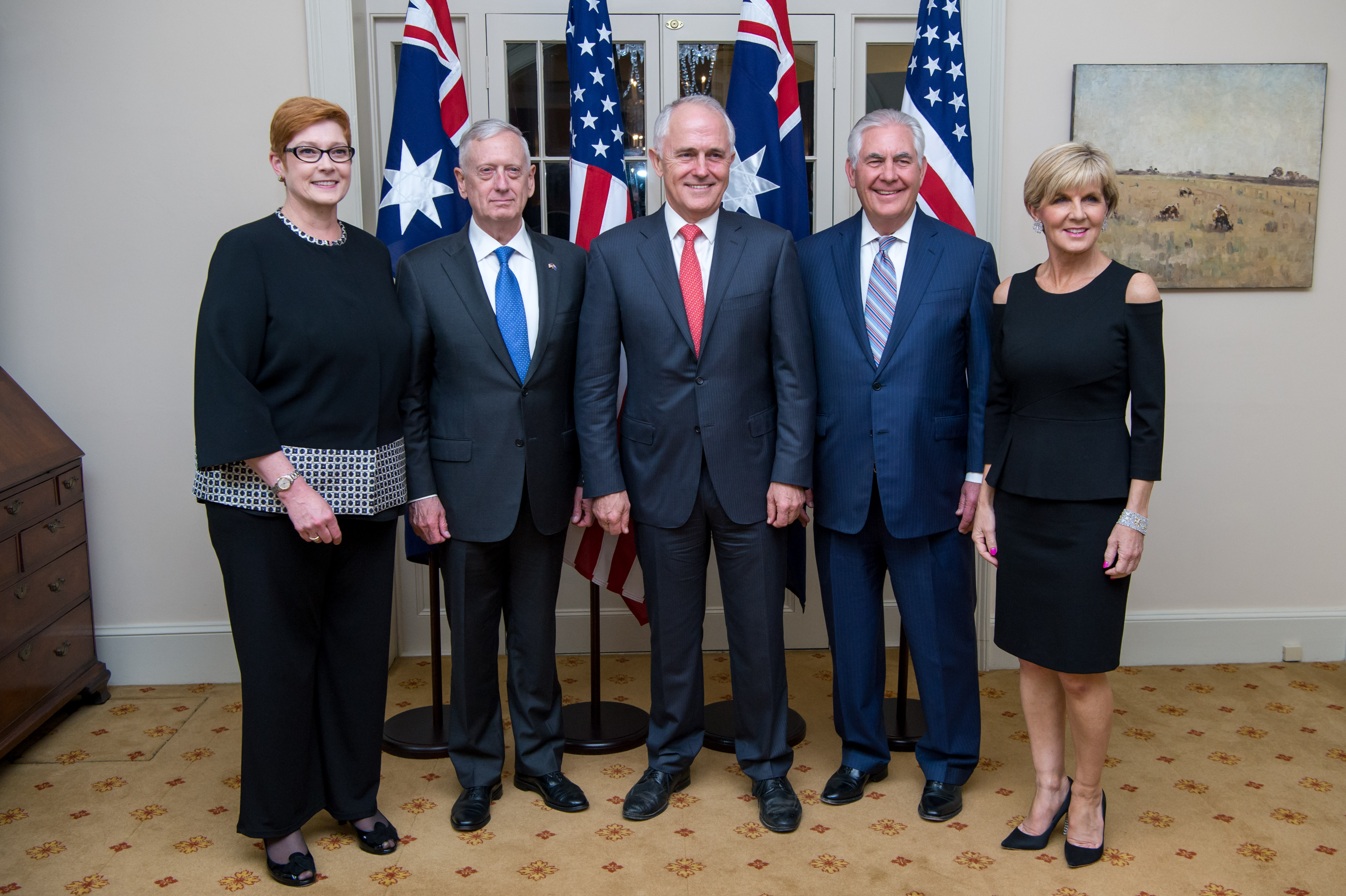
Payne with James Mattis, Malcolm Turnbull, Rex Tillerson, and Julie Bishop in June 2017

Payne oversaw the final months of the long-anticipated 2016 Defence White Paper, which she launched in February 2016 with Turnbull and Chief of the Defence Force Mark Binskin. She also launched the government's Integrated Investment Program and the Defence Industry Policy Statement. A spokeswoman for the Chinese Foreign Ministry criticised the white paper for its "negative" remarks about the South China Sea. Payne responded that "we have a strong defence relationship [with China] but we do have a point of difference in this regard and we are certainly not going to take a backward step in articulating our position". In April 2016, she and Turnbull announced that French firm DCNS, now called Naval Group, had been awarded a $50 billion contract to build a new fleet of submarines for the Royal Australian Navy. The submarine project will be undertaken in Adelaide rather than in France, generating 2,800 jobs. Payne had abdominal surgery in late 2016, which resulted in the deferral of the "two-plus-two" meeting between the foreign and defence ministers of Australia and Japan.

In January 2018, the Australian Financial Review reported that Turnbull had considered replacing Payne with Christopher Pyne in the December 2017 cabinet reshuffle. She would then have been appointed to succeed Mark Higgie as the Australian Ambassador to NATO and the European Union. Her department reportedly began preparing briefing papers for the new minister, but in the end the move was not carried out.

=== Morrison government (2018–2022) ===
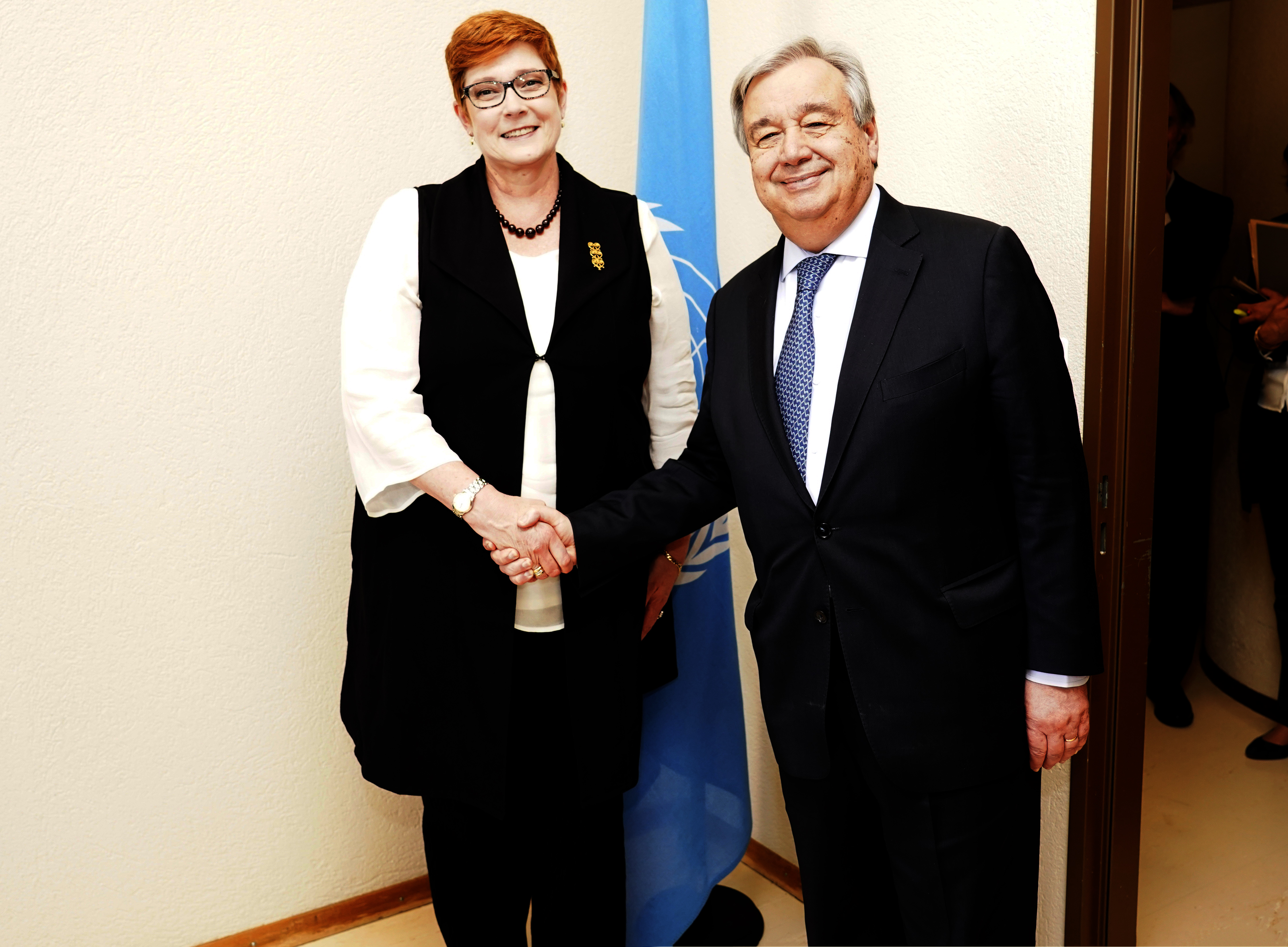
Payne with UN Secretary-General António Guterres in February 2019

Malcolm Turnbull was replaced by Scott Morrison as Liberal leader and prime minister on 24 August 2018. Foreign minister Julie Bishop, an unsuccessful candidate for the Liberal leadership, announced her resignation from cabinet on 26 August. Morrison subsequently announced that Payne would succeed Bishop as Minister for Foreign Affairs in the new government. She was sworn in on 28 August, becoming Australia's second female foreign minister.

After the government's re-election at the 2019 election, Payne was also appointed Minister for Women.

On 19 April 2020, Payne called for a global inquiry into the origins of the COVID-19 pandemic including China's handling of the initial outbreak in Wuhan. She called for the inquiry to be conducted independently of the World Health Organization. Payne's call was supported by the opposition Labor Party's Health spokesperson Chris Bowen, who urged the Morrison government to win international support for the inquiry.

Payne welcomed the normalization agreement between Israel and the United Arab Emirates as a positive and important step towards a peaceful and secure Middle East, adding that she welcomed the suspension of Israel's plans to annex parts of the Palestinian territories in the West Bank.

In mid-April 2021, Payne visited her New Zealand counterpart Nanaia Mahuta to discuss several issues of concern to Australia-New Zealand relations including New Zealand deportees from Australia, the ISIL bride Suhayra Aden and the two government's differing approaches towards China and the Five Eyes alliance.

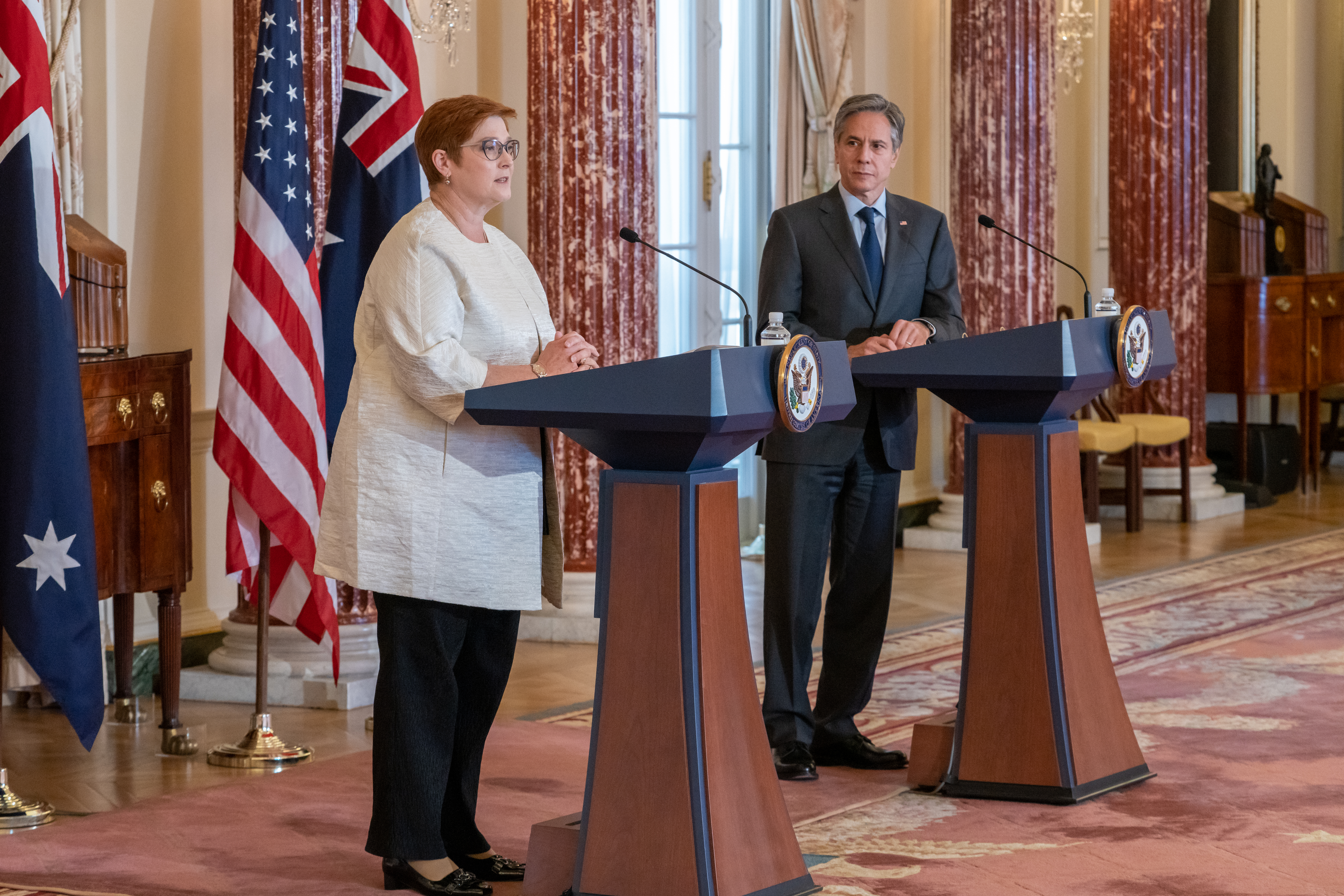
Payne and U.S. Secretary of State Antony J. Blinken have a joint press conference at the U.S. Department of State in Washington, D.C., on 13 May 2021.

In early June 2021, Marise contacted her Saudi Arabian counterpart to address the plight of a dual national, Osama al-Hasani, extradited from Morocco and being allegedly kept in detention in the Kingdom. Payne took the measure following increasing pressure from human rights groups concerning al-Hasani's detention. The dual Saudi-Australia citizen was arrested on 8 February by Moroccan authorities and extradited to Saudi Arabia, due to alleged accusations of stealing Range Rovers from a car dealership in 2015. Human Rights Watch claims that al-Hasani was cleared of all wrongdoings as per a 2019 affidavit it viewed.

Following the 2021 Hong Kong legislative election, Payne and her fellow foreign ministers from New Zealand, the United Kingdom, Canada and the US Secretary of State issued a joint statement criticising the exclusion of opposition candidates, the Hong Kong national security law, and the curtailment of media freedoms. The joint statement also urged Beijing to abide by its international obligations to protect human rights and freedoms in Hong Kong including those guaranteed by the Sino-British Joint Declaration.

=== Opposition (2022–2023) ===
Payne was re-elected as a senator in the 2022 federal election, where the Liberal/National Coalition was defeated and became the Opposition for the first time since 2013. Following the election defeat, Payne was made a secretary in the shadow ministry and served as Deputy Chair of the Parliamentary Standards Committee and was a member of the joint statutory oversight committee of the National Anti-Corruption Commission. On 8 September 2023, Payne announced her forthcoming resignation as a Senator, which took effect on 30 September 2023.

== Political positions ==
Payne is viewed as a member of the Liberal Party's moderate or "small-l liberal" wing. In a 2008 interview, she stated: "I am a liberal, I am a member of the Liberal Party. I have always called myself a liberal. If I had wanted to be a conservative I would have gone to London and joined the Conservative Party." Payne is a republican, and served as vice-chair of the Australian Republican Movement in the 1990s. According to Senator Simon Birmingham, she argued forcefully in the Liberal partyroom against the Northern Territory National Emergency Response. In 2002, she said she had "very real concerns" about how mandatory detention of illegal immigrants affected women and children, proposing that they instead be released into the community. In 2004, in response to calls for the federal government to withdraw Medicare funding of abortions, she stated "people should not be prepared to see the rights and health of Australian women go backwards".

== Sponsor – USS Canberra (LCS–30) ==
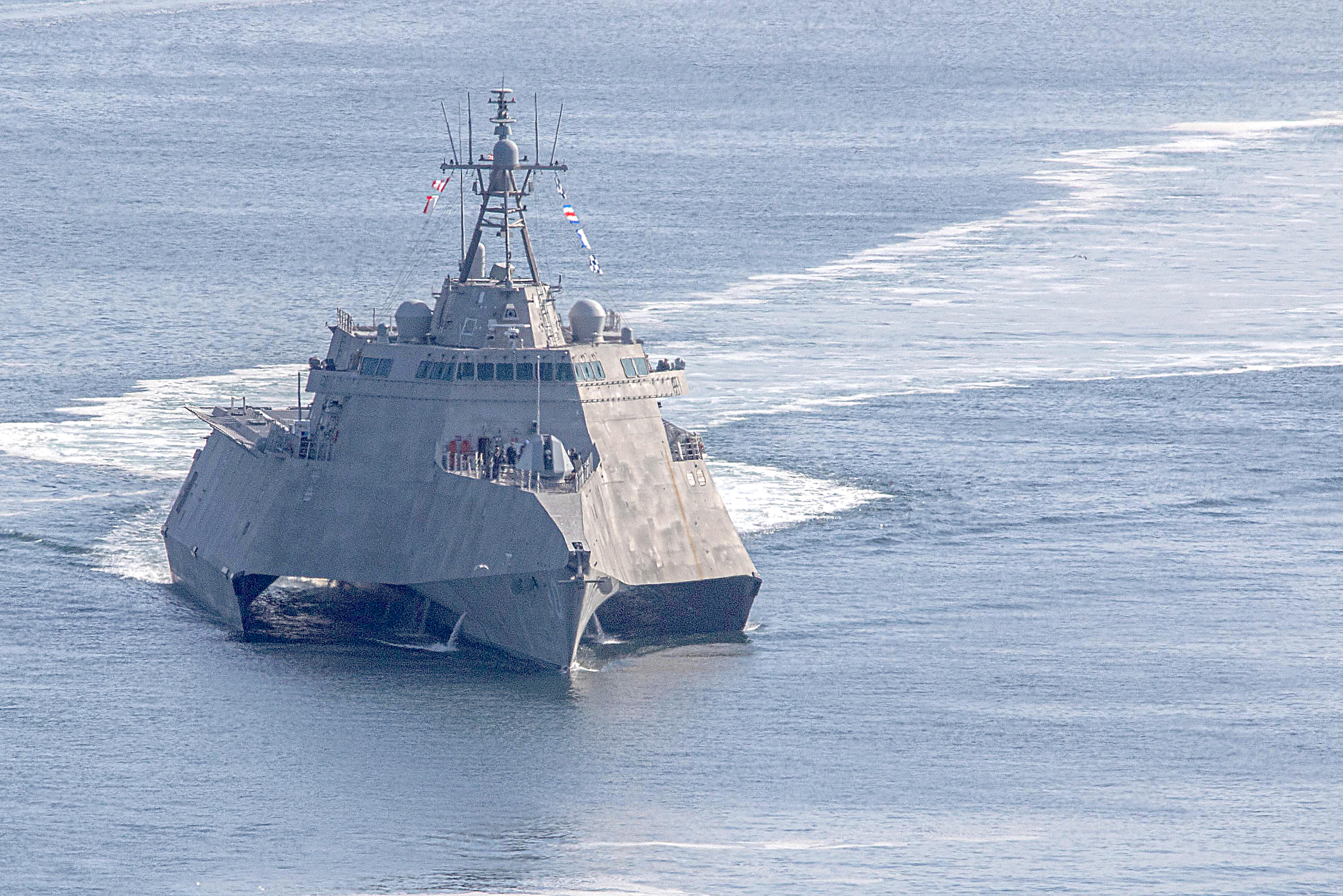
USS Canberra

Payne is the sponsor for the littoral combat ship, USS Canberra.

During the early building of the ship, Payne was at the Australian ship builder's Austal USA facility in Mobile, Alabama, and welded her initials into the keel of the ship. She has made presentations of art to the ship, linking it to its name city, Canberra, Australian Capital Territory. She was present at the commissioning ceremony at the Royal Australian Navy's Fleet Base East on 22 July 2023, and at the Freedom of Entry ceremony in Canberra on 23 July 2023.

== Personal life ==
Payne was in a long-term relationship with her domestic partner Stuart Ayres, who was a minister in the New South Wales state government. The couple met while campaigning together at the 2007 federal election. From 2010, they were building a home together in Mulgoa. In 2024, they separated.

Parliament of Australia
Preceded by Bob Woods	Senator for New South Wales; 1997–2023	Succeeded by Dave Sharma
Preceded by Kim Carr	Longest serving member of the Australian Senate; 2022–2023	Succeeded by Penny Wong
Political offices
Preceded by Jan McLucas	Minister for Human Services; 2013–2015	Succeeded by Stuart Robert
Preceded by Kevin Andrews	Minister for Defence; 2015–2018	Succeeded by Christopher Pyne
Preceded by Julie Bishop	Minister for Foreign Affairs; 2018–2022	Succeeded by Penny Wong
