= Gambler's Help =

Gambler's Help is a network of agencies funded by the State Government in Victoria, Australia to provide a range of community served for gambling related issues. Gambler's Help is administered by the Victorian Responsible Gambling Foundation, but receives funding from the Community Support Fund which receives a portion of the profits from the operation of gaming machines (better known as poker machines) in Victoria.

== History ==
Gambler's Help was established under the name Breakeven in 1994 with the first regional services commencing operation in 1995. The name was changed to Gambler's Help in November 2000.

== Network ==
The Gambler's Help network in the state of Victoria consists of:

- A range of projects and a communications campaign delivered and managed by the Office of Gaming and Racing's Problem Gambling Unit
- A statewide telephone counselling service
  - Gambler's Help Line 1800 858 858
- Regional services which provide counselling, financial counselling and community education as well as manage local projects.

Separately funded are a Gambler's Help Indigenous service and multicultural service.
