= Ray Gietzelt =

Australian trade unionist

Ray Gietzelt AO
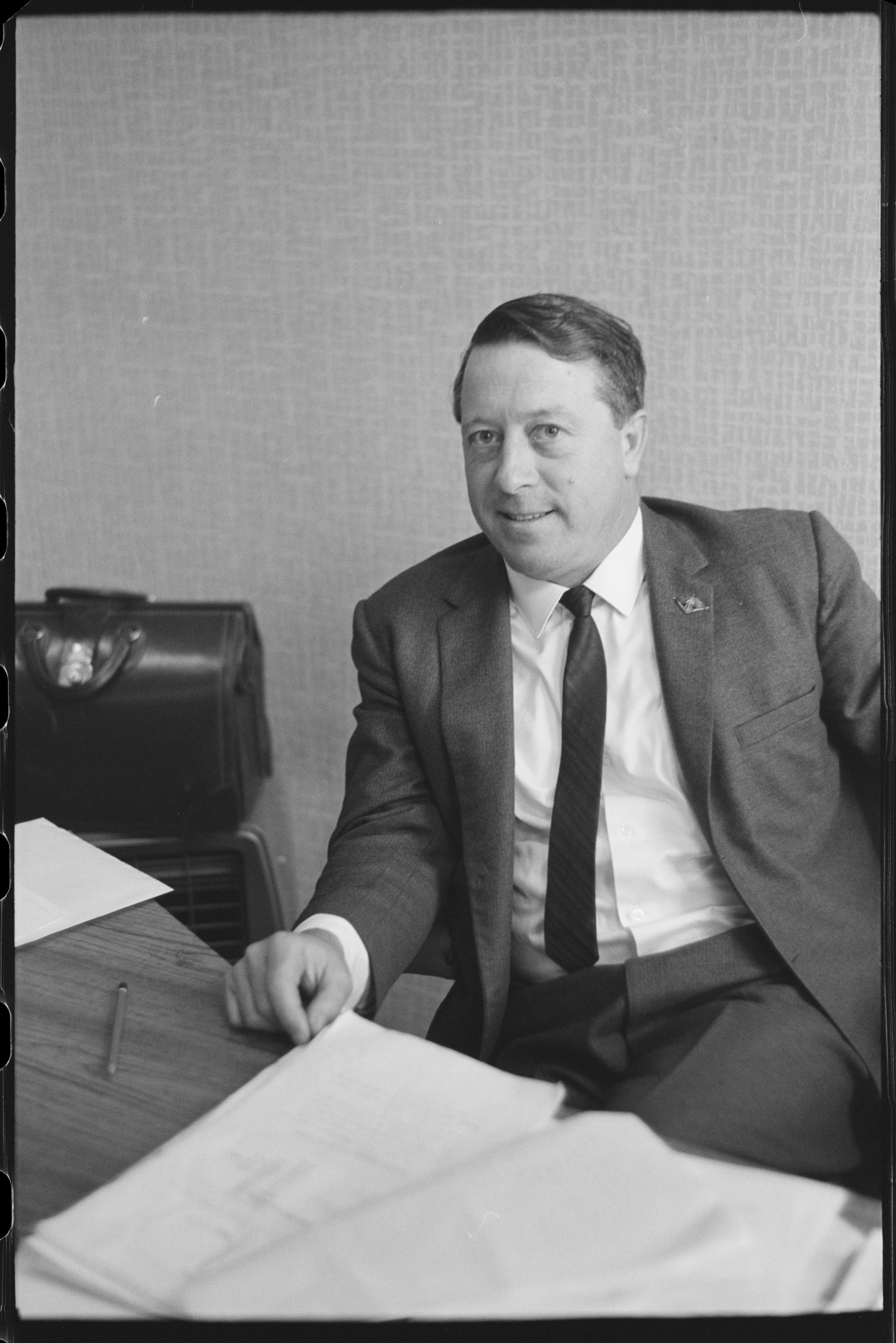

General Secretary of the Federated Miscellaneous Workers' Union
- In office 1955–1984
- Preceded by: Stan Bevan
- Succeeded by: Martin Ferguson

Personal details
- Born: 29 September 1922 Sydney
- Died: 12 October 2012 (aged 90)

Ray Gietzelt AO (29 September 1922 – 12 October 2012) was a major figure in the Australian union movement in the latter part of the 20th century. He led the Federated Miscellaneous Workers' Union of Australia (FMWU; later known as United Voice) from 1955 to 1984. Ray Gietzelt exerted major influence in the careers of Bob Hawke, Neville Wran and Lionel Murphy, and he was made a Life Member of the Australian Labor Party.

The former Australian senator and Sutherland Shire mayor Arthur Gietzelt was his elder brother.

== Early life ==
Ray Gietzelt was born in Sydney in 1922. His father owned a tyre business in Newtown that collapsed during the Great Depression as his clients found themselves unable to pay their bills. As a consequence, the family had to move a number of times in search of cheaper rents.

In 1940 he went to work for a chemical company known as Incorporated Laboratories. At that time he joined the Federated Miscellaneous Workers' Union of Australia (FMWU). He also studied chemistry at Ultimo Technical College at nights.

In 1941 he joined the Australian Army and served in Papua New Guinea with the 9th Field Company of the Royal Australian Engineers, until discharge in 1945. He married later that year. He then joined a small chemical company, Getz Products, run by his father. He resumed his membership of the FMWU despite working in a junior management position.

== Union career ==
He became active in the campaign by a left-wing group known as the Protest Committee to wrest control of the FMWU from an entrenched right-wing faction that was seen as not accountable to the members. The matter proceeded to the Conciliation and Arbitration Court, where the Protest Committee was represented by Lionel Murphy, and the union leadership by John Kerr. The court ruled in favour of the Protest Committee. Gietzelt became General Secretary of the Union in 1955, at the time being Australia's youngest federal secretary of a union. He remained in that post until his retirement in 1984.

Gietzelt modernised the union, facilitating rank and file participation and encouraging the involvement of women. He oversaw a change in the union's strategy to include more direct bargaining between the union and employers rather than relying on arbitration courts. During this period the union won a number of important victories. They successfully ended the degrading ″bull system″ for casual waterfront watchmen that saw workers waiting in line to be picked by the boss for work. They also won the highly publicised Arthur Murray dispute in 1959, in which the union took up the cause of dance instructors and ran the first ever successful prosecution of a company for a lock-out in NSW. FMWU membership increased from 22,000 in 1955 to 122,000 on his retirement in 1984. It was said that, under Gietzelt's leadership, the FMWU union never lost a strike or broke its word with any employer, industrial tribunal or kindred organisation.

== Political activity ==
He was a member of the Australian Labor Party and journalists named him "kingmaker" because of his influence in the careers of senior Labor figures such as his close friends Bob Hawke, Neville Wran and Lionel Murphy. He was elected to an executive position on the Australian Council of Trade Unions (ACTU) in 1967. Bob Hawke credited him with being the single most significant figure in helping him gain the leadership of the ACTU. Brian Harradine, a Tasmanian delegate from the Right, opposed Hawke's candidature, and Ray Gietzelt was instrumental in having Harradine censured and later expelled from the Labor Party. Hawke later became Prime Minister of Australia (1983–91), and Ray Gietzelt's elder brother Arthur Gietzelt, a Senator for New South Wales 1971–89, was his Minister for Veterans' Affairs 1983–87 (Arthur had served with Ray in Papua New Guinea during World War II).

Ray Gietzelt helped Neville Wran secure caucus support for him to become party leader (and later Premier of New South Wales), and organised numbers for Lionel Murphy to become a Senator (and later Attorney-General in the Whitlam government). Together with Wran and Whitlam, in 1986 Gietzelt helped establish the Lionel Murphy Foundation which awards scholarships to postgraduate students of science or law with a commitment to social justice.

In July 1970 he supported federal intervention into the New South Wales Branch of the Labor Party. This led to some democratisation of the branch, including the introduction of proportional representation.

== Retirement ==
He was appointed an Officer of the Order of Australia in 1985. He served on the board of Qantas and as a Member of the Automotive Industry Authority. He was awarded life membership of the Australian Labor Party in 2003. He published his memoirs, Worth Fighting For in 2004.

Ray Gietzelt died on 12 October 2012, aged 90.

Non-profit organization positions
Preceded by Stan Bevan	General Secretary of the Federated Miscellaneous Workers' Union; 1955–1984	Succeeded by Martin Ferguson
