= Bob Woods (politician) =

Australian politician

The Honourable Bob Woods

Member of the Australian Parliament for Lowe
- In office 11 July 1987 – 13 March 1993
- Preceded by: Michael Maher
- Succeeded by: Mary Easson

Senator for New South Wales
- In office 8 March 1994 – 7 March 1997
- Preceded by: Bronwyn Bishop
- Succeeded by: Marise Payne

Personal details
- Born: 13 April 1947 (age 79) London, England
- Party: Liberal Party of Australia
- Occupation: Cancer specialist
- Profession: Medical practitioner

Robert Leslie Woods (born 13 April 1947) is an Australian former politician. He was a Liberal Senator for the state of New South Wales in Australia between 1994 and 1997. Woods was previously a Member of the Australian House of Representatives as the Liberal member for Lowe between 1987 and 1993. Woods served as a Parliamentary Secretary to the Minister for Health and Family Services between 1996 and 1997.

== Early life ==
Born in London, England, Woods attended the University of London and then (having moved to Australia) the University of Sydney. He became a doctor and cancer specialist and then served as an Advisor to the Minister for Health, Dr Michael Wooldridge.

== Politics ==
In 1987, Woods was elected to the Australian House of Representatives as the Liberal member for Lowe, defeating Labor MP Michael Maher. He held the seat until his defeat in 1993 by Labor's Mary Easson. The following year, however, he was appointed to the Australian Senate as a Senator for New South Wales following the resignation of Bronwyn Bishop, who was transferring to the House of Representatives. In 1996, when the Liberal/National Coalition won government, he was appointed Parliamentary Secretary to the Minister for Health and Family Services.

On 3 February 1997, Woods announced he would be resigning from the Senate in March, citing the need to spend more time with his family; he resigned on 7 March 1997. It later emerged that allegations of misuse of parliamentary privileges and revelations concerning his personal life forced his resignation.

Woods was charged with 41 counts of fraud and in 1999 pleaded guilty to six counts of "imposing on the Commonwealth", received a suspended sentence of eighteen months imprisonment and a fine of $5,000 and was ordered to pay reparation to the Commonwealth of $10,708.

== Personal life ==
Woods' first wife died from leukemia and was the inspiration for him to become a cancer specialist. After arriving in Australia in 1977 he had a long term relationship and had a son. On 13 June 1986 he married Dr Jane Carrick a daughter of another senator, Sir John Carrick and they would have two children.

== Bibliography ==
- Parliamentary Handbook

Parliament of Australia
| Preceded by Bronwyn Bishop | Senator for New South Wales; 1994–1997 | Succeeded by Marise Payne |
| Preceded by Michael Maher | Member for Lowe; 1987–1993 | Succeeded by Mary Easson |
