= Mary Easson =

Australian politician

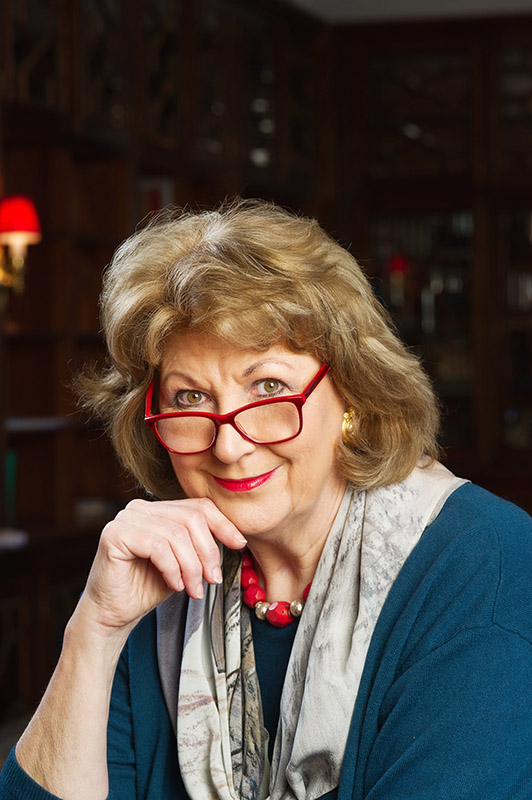

Member of the Australian Parliament for Lowe
- In office 13 March 1993 – 2 March 1996
- Preceded by: Bob Woods
- Succeeded by: Paul Zammit

Personal details
- Born: 16 June 1955 (age 71) Melbourne
- Party: Australian Labor Party
- Spouse: Michael Easson

Mary Louise Easson (née Alexander) (born 16 June 1955) is an Australian former politician and business consultant. She was an Australian Labor Party member of the Australian House of Representatives from 1993 to 1996, representing the Sydney-based electorate of Lowe.

== Early life and career ==
Easson was born in Melbourne and was educated at Star of the Sea College. She joined the Labor Party at eighteen, and was the Victorian state president and the national vice-president of Australian Young Labor in 1976. She worked thereafter as a political research officer for Frank Crean and Ben Humphreys between 1976 and 1979, as a public affairs manager for Australian Consolidated Industries (ACI) from 1979 to 1985, a human resources manager with Ansett Airlines from 1985 to 1990 and a business consultant from 1990 to 1993. She became a member of the board of UNICEF in 1988 and subsequently served as its national secretary. She was the unsuccessful Labor candidate for Lowe at the 1990 federal election.

== In parliament ==
She was elected to the House of Representatives on her second attempt at the 1993 federal election, defeating Liberal shadow health spokesperson Bob Woods after a redistribution shifted the marginal seat slightly more in Labor's favour. The result was touted as a "surprise" victory that the party had not expected to win, with voter concern over Liberal proposals around Medicare (in Woods' portfolio) and the future of the Sydney Airport curfew and a campaign having reportedly been significant. Easson's campaign was widely praised in the days after the election. She was a member of the Labor Right faction.

Easson was touted as a potential candidate for a ministry or parliamentary secretary role, but remained on the backbench. A devout Catholic, in 1994 she jointly drafted a petition of MPs protesting the timing of an ABC television broadcast of highlights of the Sydney Gay and Lesbian Mardi Gras, proposing a later evening timeslot rather than opposing the broadcast itself. She supported affirmative action for women candidates within Labor, arguing that it would help the party win seats, and moved a resolution to that effect at the 1994 Federal Australian Labor Party Conference.

By late 1994, aircraft noise from Sydney Airport was emerging as a major issue to contend with, with the closure of the east–west runway placing pressure on Easson and other MPs representing areas surrounding the airport, while she also faced pressure over a controversial government decision to expand woodchip exports. In the leadup to the 1996 election, the aircraft noise issue became an increasingly dominant issue in her electorate; she was "pushed to the forefront" of the debate, but declined to cross the floor to support a John Howard-written amendment that would have reopened the east–west runway and reduced noise in her electorate. The Sydney Morning Herald wrote that the Labor Party had "helped and cruelled her prospects", but that she was "unlikely to resist the backlash on noise". By January 1996, amidst poor Labor polling statewide, media reports suggested that she would struggle to hold her seat, with clashing policies over airport noise emerging as a key campaign issue. She was easily defeated amidst the Labor landslide defeat at the 1996 federal election by Liberal candidate and former state MP Paul Zammit.

== Post-politics ==
Following her 1996 defeat, she was touted as a candidate for Paul Keating's federal seat of Blaxland; but this did not eventuate, with Keating's support for his staffer Michael Hatton seeing him chosen in Blaxland; she specifically ruled out a career in state politics.

In 1996 she founded public affairs firm Probity International. In 1998, The Australian reported a corporate source saying of Easson: "People know that if you want anything from Labor you go to her".

Easson was elected to the board of NRMA on Nicholas Whitlam's ticket in October 1997, becoming deputy president in November 2000. She resigned from the NRMA board in late 2001, seeking to focus on her role as director of its demutualised sister company NRMA Insurance. She continued as a board member of NRMA Insurance (later IAG Group) until her retirement in late 2003.

In 2003 she stood as a candidate for national president of the Labor Party, having been nominated by Queensland Premier Peter Beattie with support from the NSW Right; however, she was unsuccessful. She also served a stint as chairperson of Life Education NSW during the 2000s.

She was seriously ill in 2009, spending 80 days in intensive care with necrotic pancreatitis and six months in hospital.

In 2016 Easson's lobbying activities drew attention due to Probity International's work for InTech Strategies, an Australian company with advisory links to Israeli defence and weapons manufacturer Elbit, which was awarded contracts related to Australian government defence technology projects. Easson had emerged as an influential pro-Israel and two-state solution voice within the party’s debates over policy on Israel and Palestine. She served as co-chair of the Australia-Israel Leadership Dialogue, which organised policy discussions involving current and former MPs from Australia, Israel, and the United Kingdom. Reports confused this organisation with the Melbourne-based Australia-Israel Labour Dialogue (same initials), which was funding trips for MPs to Israel to support its platform. Despite never having been involved with that organisation, Easson stated that Elbit had not made donations to Australian political organisations, including the AILD, but was met with criticism from opposing Labor MPs: Bob Carr stated that any connection to Elbit was "a shameful look — arms dealers, civilian deaths, the electronic fence" and called for transparency as to their fundraising, while Melissa Parke said of the situation: "it is a concern not to know who is providing the funds". Michael Danby MP, in the Federal Parliament, said in March 2016 “As a matter of fact, both AILD and Elbit have confirmed that no defence contractor has contributed a dollar to the visits of Australian Labor activists to Israel or to the AILD.” And that “Mary is a supporter of Israel …and an activist in the Australian Labor Party, but no credible link can be drawn between her support for these organisations and her professional endeavours.”

After completing a Master’s degree at the University of New South Wales, Easson published a book about the history of Australia's retirement incomes and superannuation system, Keating's and Kelty's Super Legacy, in 2017.

== Personal life ==
In 1984, she married Michael Easson, a businessman, former unionist, and former secretary of the Labor Council of New South Wales. They have two daughters and four grandchildren.

Parliament of Australia
| Preceded by Bob Woods | Member for Lowe; 1993–1996 | Succeeded by Paul Zammit |
