= Irene Pnevmatikos =

Australian politician

Member of the South Australian Legislative Council
- In office 17 March 2018 – 10 October 2023

Personal details
- Party: Labor
- Occupation: Lawyer

Irene Pnevmatikos is an Australian politician. She was a Labor member of the South Australian Legislative Council from 2018 to 2023.

Pnevmatikos was a lawyer before her election, and is associated with the Left faction. She resigned due to ill health in 2023.
