= Arthur Gietzelt =

Australian politician

The Honourable Arthur Gietzelt AO
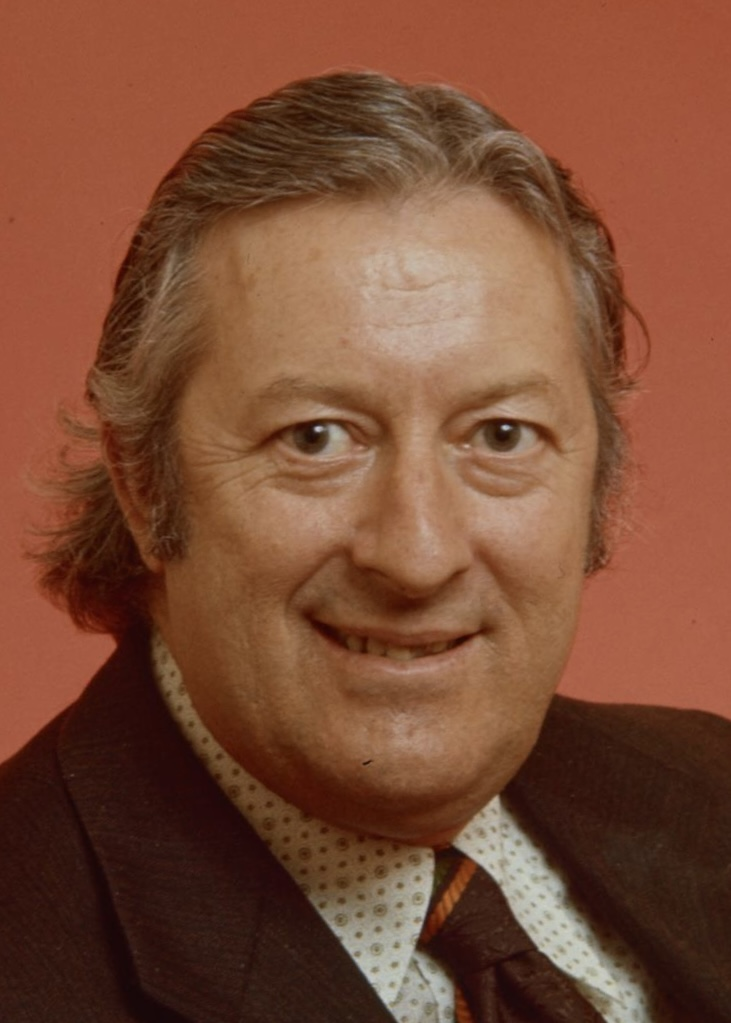
- Gietzelt in 1974

Minister for Veterans' Affairs
- In office 11 March 1983 – 24 July 1987
- Prime Minister: Bob Hawke
- Preceded by: Tony Messner
- Succeeded by: Ben Humphreys

Senator for New South Wales
- In office 1 July 1971 – 27 February 1989
- Succeeded by: John Faulkner

Personal details
- Born: 28 December 1920 San Francisco, California, United States
- Died: 5 January 2014 (aged 93) Sydney, New South Wales, Australia
- Party: Labor
- Spouse: Dawn Haslam (m. 1949)
- Relations: Ray Gietzelt (brother)

Military service
- Allegiance: Australia
- Branch/service: Australian Army
- Years of service: 1941–1946
- Rank: Sergeant
- Unit: Royal Australian Engineers

Arthur Thomas Gietzelt AO (28 December 1920 – 5 January 2014) was an Australian politician. He was a member of the Australian Labor Party (ALP) and served as a Senator for New South Wales from 1971 to 1989. He was Minister for Veterans' Affairs in the Hawke government from 1983 to 1987.

== Early life ==
Gietzelt was born in San Francisco on 28 December 1920. He was the first of three children born to Ida Caroline (née Stoward) and Arthur Anton Gietzelt, including his younger brother Ray. His Australian parents had travelled to the United States for his father's business interests in the automotive industry.

Gietzelt and his parents returned to Sydney in August 1922. He attended state schools at Newtown, Enfield and Sans Souci, completing his secondary education at Hurstville Boys' High School. Gietzelt's father held a distributorship for an American manufacturer of solid rubber tyres and ran a tyre business in Newtown from 1923 to 1929. The business failed during the Great Depression, but his father subsequently established a successful manufacturing business, Getz Products, producing paint chemicals, shoe polish and dyes at premises in Sans Souci and Rockdale.

After leaving school, Gietzelt undertook further studying in typing and stenography and worked as a warehouse assistant. He enlisted in the Australian Imperial Force in May 1941 and served in New Guinea from 1943 to 1945. He was attached to the Royal Australian Engineers where he "produced an army newspaper and enjoyed the experience of keeping his fellow-soldiers informed about world events".

Gietzelt returned to the family business after the war's end. He was a long-serving member of the Federated Clerks' Union.

== Early political involvement ==
In 1937, Gietzelt joined the Industrial Labor Party (ILP), a breakaway left-wing body associated with Bob Heffron which opposed the mainstream Australian Labor Party (ALP) in New South Wales controlled by the Lang Labor faction. He was also the state treasurer of the Australian Labor League of Youth.

Gietzelt attended the unity conference in 1939 which saw the ILP return to the ALP. The reconciliation was short-lived and in 1940 he joined the State Labor Party, another left-wing breakaway. He eventually rejoined the official ALP in 1946 as a member of the Miranda branch. Gietzelt was elected to the Sutherland Shire Council in 1956. He served as shire president from 1961 to 1963 and from 1966 to 1971, resigning from the council after his election to the Senate. As a councillor he was "a strong supporter of environmental and conservation causes, protecting the Royal National Park from development, and halting the reclamation of Botany Bay for refuse disposal when its impact on aquaculture was made known". He also opposed the creation of a second Sydney airport at Towra Point.

=== Factional leadership ===
Gietzelt and his brother Ray, the long-serving general secretary of the Federated Miscellaneous Workers' Union, were powerful figures in the left-wing faction of the ALP in New South Wales.

== Federal politics ==
Gietzelt was elected to a six-year Senate term at the 1970 election, commencing on 1 July 1971. He was re-elected to further terms at the 1974, 1975, 1977, 1983 and 1987 elections, on three occasions having his term cut short by double dissolutions. He resigned from the Senate on 27 February 1989, having delayed his retirement in order to ensure his preferred successor, John Faulkner, would be nominated to the casual vacancy.

In 1976 Gietzelt joined Jim Cairns, Barry Egan and Bridget Gilling as a member of the Tribunal on Homosexuals and Discrimination. He was appointed Minister for Veterans' Affairs in March 1983 in the first Hawke Ministry and held that position until July 1987. He was a joint Father of the Senate from 1987 until his departure from parliament. He resigned from the Senate in February 1989.

== Personal life ==
In 1949, Gietzelt married Dawn Haslam, with whom he had three children. They had been introduced the previous year and were both officeholders in the Australian Labor League of Youth.

Gietzelt was made an Officer of the Order of Australia in 1992 for "service to the Australian Parliament and to local government".

Gietzelt died on 5 January 2014, aged 93.

Political offices
Preceded by Tony Messner	Minister for Veterans' Affairs; 1983–87	Succeeded by Ben Humphreys
Parliament of Australia
Preceded by Doug McClelland	Father of the Australian Senate; 1987–1989 with Peter Durack	Succeeded by Peter Durack
