= Michael Easson =

Australian businessman and former trade union leader (born 1955)

Michael Bernard Easson
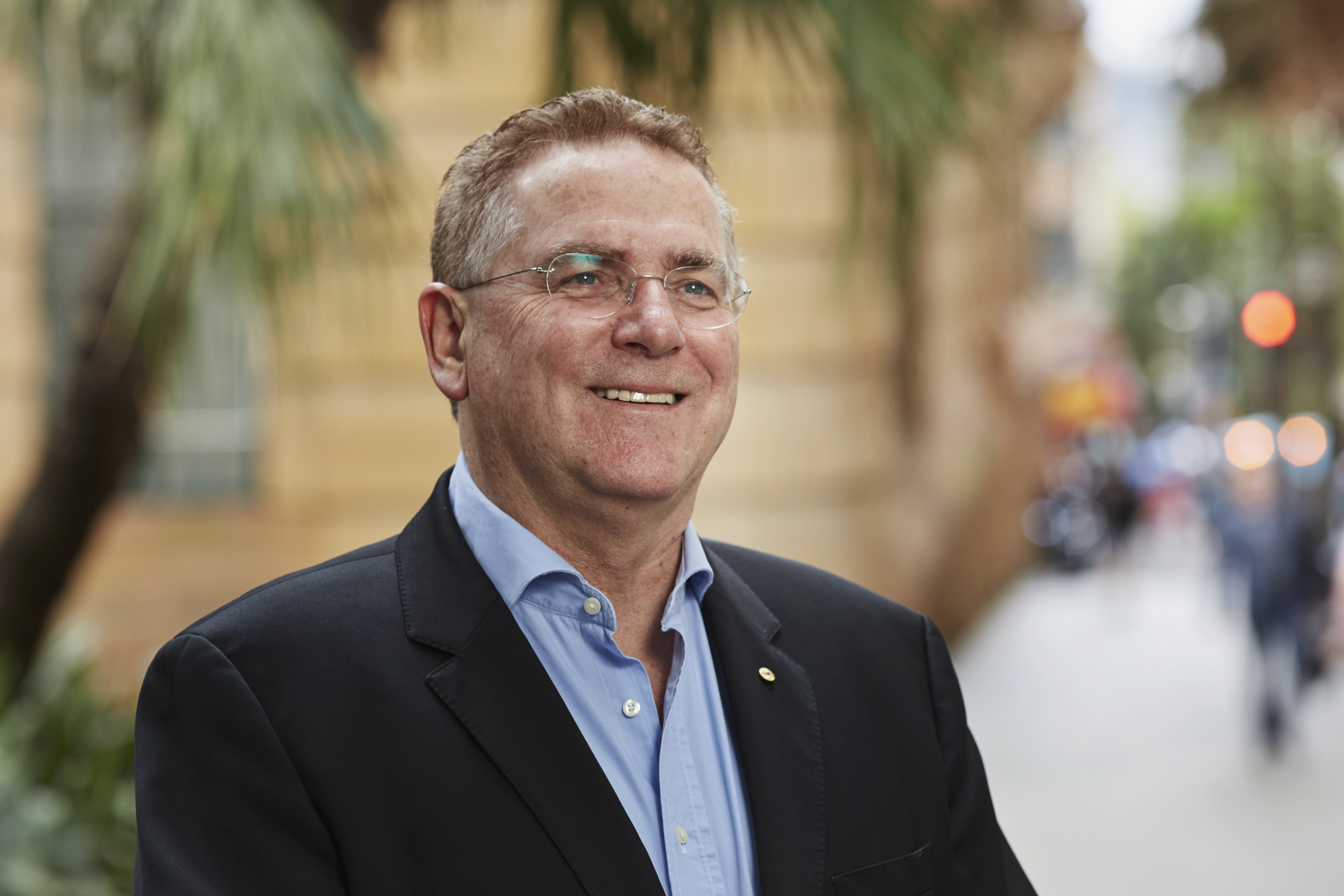
- Born: 22 March 1955 (age 71); Sydney, Australia
- Citizenship: Australian
- Education: Sydney Technical High School
- Alma mater: University of New South Wales; Campion Hall, University of Oxford; Australian Defence Force Academy
- Occupation: Businessman
- Political party: Labor Party
- Spouse: Mary Easson

Michael Bernard Easson AM (born 22 March 1955 in Sydney, New South Wales, Australia), is an Australian businessman and former trade union leader. On 8 June 1998, Easson was appointed as a Member of the Order of Australia (AM).

== Business career ==
Since mid-1994, Easson has worked in business, initially holding a range of company directorships. Since 2000, he has focused on businesses he co-founded, principally EG Funds Management.

His business activities have included work with the Geha brothers and others at EG Funds Management, a property funds management business he co-founded and tech startups, including Reveal, Avani Solutions, and FLNT.

== Trade union work ==
Easson's working career began in 1978 as a research assistant to the Hon. John Brown MP. He then joined the Labor Council of New South Wales (now Unions NSW) as education and research officer, then assistant secretary (1984) and secretary (1989–1994). At the age of 34, he was elected as the youngest ever secretary. He was elected vice president of the Australian Council of Trade Unions, 1993 to 1994, and senior vice president of the Labor Party (NSW Branch) between 1993 and 1995. Whilst at the Labor Council, he was managing director of Radio Station 2KY (1989–1994), and in 1989 co-founded both Asset Super (since 2012 part of CARE Super) and Chifley Financial Services. He also served on the boards of the Public Authorities Superannuation Scheme and, following its merger, the State Superannuation Board from 1984 to 1995. He was a member of the State Rail Authority Board from 1989 to 1992. Between 1978 and 1987, Easson served as a member of the National and NSW council of the Trade Union Trading Authority (TUTA).

Towards the end of his tenure at the Labor Council, he was appointed to the board of NRMA Insurance Group (now AIG) and served from 1993 to 1996.

In 1994, Easson resigned as secretary of the Labor Council after failing to win support for his proposed candidacy for the Senate vacancy left by the resigning Graham Richardson and a falling out with Prime Minister Paul Keating after Easson criticised the 1993 Budget proposal to tax at high marginal rates untaken sick leave and long service leave – measures subsequently reversed after an outcry by unions and government MPs. Easson was touted for a seat in the New South Wales Legislative Council and Deputy Leadership of the ALP there in a Chamber of which he had previously been dismissive. But no vacancy materialised, and Easson decided that his wife, Mary Easson, already in the Federal Parliament as the Member for Lowe, was better at politics and that he should pursue a full-time business career.

=== Business related ===
Easson joined the private sector in 1994, recruited by Sydney Olympic Bid Chief Rod McGeogh for law firm Corrs Chambers Westgarth, and serving on various Boards, including as an independent Director on Macquarie's Industrial Property fund, a predecessor to the Goodman Group, the industrial property REIT. Specialising as a company director with businesses in infrastructure, construction and investment, along with Sydney businessmen Shane Geha and Adam Geha, Easson formed EG Property and EG Funds Management in 2000, of which he is co-owner and executive chairman.

Easson served as non-executive chair of the Association of Superannuation Funds of Australia (ASFA) (2015-2022), executive director and co-owner of both EG and the building technology company Ridley & Co, and non-executive chair of the Canberra Renewal Authority.

In March 2017, he stepped down as chair of Icon Water, formerly known as ACTEW Corporation, and as chair of ActewAGL, the energy distribution and retail business in Canberra. In July 2016, Michael Easson retired as a director of ANZ Stadium.

From 2012 to 2014 he was chair of the Ministerial Advisory Council on Skilled Migration.

Easson has served on several top 50 Australian and other boards; his experience includes as a director NSW State Superannuation Board and predecessor boards (1984–1995), the State Rail Authority (1989–1993), NRMA Insurance (1993–96), Macquarie-Goodman Industrial Fund (1994–2003), Barclay Mowlem (1998–2000), InTech (1998–2003), Macquarie Infrastructure Group (1996–2007), Kaldor family company boards in apparel, chemicals and office works (1997–2004), Metro Transport Sydney (2002–2006), Sydney Roads Group (2006–2007), and the ING Group Real Estate Group in Australia (2004–2012).

He was the inaugural chairman of the Urban Taskforce, an urban planning policy advocate group in Australia, from 2000 to 2002.

Easson was a foundation Member of the National Competition Council (1996–99) and an assistant commissioner and commissioner of several Productivity Reports, including the review of work, health and safety in Australia (1994–95). He served as chairman of the Review of Commonwealth Payments to Statutory Authorities and Special Purpose Payment to the States (1995–96). According to then finance minister John Fahey in 1997, this resulted in one-off saving of $400 million to the Australian Government.

He was an adjunct professor of management at the Australian Graduate School of Management (1994–98) and served as senior vice president of UNICEF Australia (1998–2002) and as a member of the board of the Museum of Contemporary Art (1999–2000), and as a director of the Sydney Symphony Orchestra (1995–1996).

== Early life and education ==
Michael Easson was born in Sydney on 22 March 1955. He was educated at St Declan’s Primary School, Penshurst, and Marist Brothers Penshurst (now Marist College Penshurst), and he matriculated at Sydney Technical High School in 1972.

Easson graduated with First Class Honours in politics from the University of New South Wales in 1976. In 1981, he completed a three-month Trade Union Program at the Harvard Business School and completed a finance management program at Stanford Business School in 1997, and more recently, a Master of Science in sustainable development (with Distinction) from Campion Hall, University of Oxford, and a PhD in history from the University of New South Wales. In 2016, Easson was awarded a second PhD in transport and urban planning from the University of Melbourne.

He married Mary Easson, Member for Lowe (1993–1996), in 1984. They have two daughters and four grandchildren.

== Bibliography ==
=== Books ===
- Easson, Michael, ed. (1981). 110th Anniversary of the Labor Council of NSW. Sydney: Labor Council of NSW.
- Easson, Michael, ed. (1988). McKell : the achievements of Sir William McKell. Sydney: Allen & Unwin.
- —, ed. (1990). The foundation of Labor. Sydney: Pluto Press in association with the Lloyd Ross Forum of the Labor Council of NSW.
- —, ed. (1990). Australia and immigration : able to grow?. Sydney: Pluto Press in association with the Lloyd Ross Forum of the Labor Council of NSW.
- —, ed. (1991). Australian Industry : What Policy?. Sydney: Pluto Press in association with the Lloyd Ross Forum of the Labor Council of NSW.
- —, ed. (1992). What Should Unions Do?. Sydney: Pluto Press in association with the Lloyd Ross Forum of the Labor Council of NSW.
- —, (2023). Whitlam’s Foreign Policy. Connor Court Publications.
- —, (2024). In Search of John Christian Watson : Labor's First Prime Minister. Connor Court Publications.
- —, (2025). James Scullin. Connor Court Publications.
- —, ed. (2026). Whitlam Right and Wrong : Personal Recollections. Connor Court Publications.

=== Selected review articles ===
Year	Review article	Work(s) reviewed
2021	Easson, Michael, “Labor Must Keep The Faith”.	Published in IPA Review, Institute of Public Affairs, April 2021.
2022	Easson, Michael, "Foreword to Prudence and Power".	Published in Tom Switzer and Sue Windybank, editors, Prudence and Power. The Writings of Owen Harries, The Centre for Independent Studies/Connor Court Publishing, Redland Bay, 2022, pp. v-x.

Trade union offices
Preceded by John MacBean	Secretary of the Labor Council of New South Wales; 1989 – 1994	Succeeded by Peter Sams
