= United Workers Union =

Australian trade union

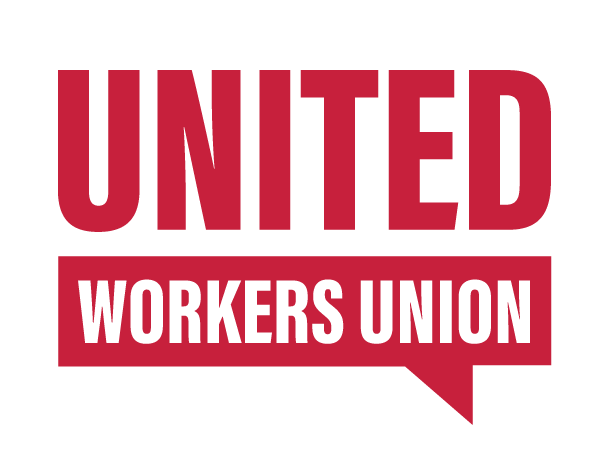
- Predecessor: United Voice; National Union of Workers
- Founded: 2019
- Location: Australia
- Members: ▲146,248 (as at 31 December 2024)
- National President: Lyndal Ryan
- National Secretary: Gary Bullock
- Vice Presidents: Carolyn Smith, Demi Pnevmatikos, Helen Gibbons, Pat O'Donnell
- Affiliations: ACTU, ALP, ILU
- Website: www.unitedworkers.org.au

The United Workers Union (UWU) is an Australian trade union. Described as the biggest blue-collar union in Australia, the UWU covers more than 150,000 workers within over 45 industries, including warehousing, defence, hospitality, health, fitness, disability support, early childhood education, aged care, logistics and supermarket supply, cleaning, security, farming, veterinary, manufacturing, and market research. The union is the result of the 2019 merger of two Australian trade unions: United Voice and the National Union of Workers. The United Workers Union is a member of the Labor Left.

The union is unique in its structure, having only one centralised federal branch which is not separated into state branches.

== History ==
In 2018, plans began to merge the two the unions United Voice and National Union of Workers. In June 2019, the Fair Work Commission approved a vote on the proposed merger between the two unions held in August 2019. On 30 August 2019 the Australian Electoral Commission declared the result of the vote, with just over 95% of members supporting the amalgamation.

In 2026 the union's elections were contested between camps headed by National Secretary Tim Kennedy, who ran on limiting support for the Australian Labor Party and increasing transparency, and National President Jo Schofield, who ran on supporting members in government funded jobs instead of focusing on strikes. The election was won by Schofield's ticket after winning in Queensland, South Australia and Western Australia.

== Governance and structure ==
The organisation operates as a national structure and does not have divisions or branches. Governance of the organisation is vested in a National Convention of approximately 500 Delegates, from industries and workplaces across Australia, elected by all financial members. A meeting of the convention is held every 4 years.

Between meetings of the National Convention its powers are exercised by a Member Council, consisting of 50 rank and file Councillors and the National Executive. Both the Councillors and the National Executive are elected by and from the convention.

The Committee of Management of the organisation is called the National Executive. It consists between 12 and 24 members, including the National President, National Secretary and 4 National Vice-presidents.

Elections for all office positions within the organisation are conducted by the Australian Electoral Commission.

The term of office for all offices is 4 years.

Lyndal Ryan, from New South Wales, is the National President, and Gary Bullock, from Queensland, is the National Secretary. Both were unanimously elected on the UWU 2026 Members Convention.

== Industrial coverage ==
The UWU have industrial coverage over:

- Aged care, home care & disability support
- Cleaners
- Property Services
- Security
- Early Childhood Educators
- Teacher's aides and education assistants
- Farm workers
- Food manufacturers
- Poultry workers
- Dairy workers
- Restaurants, bars and cafes
- Casino workers
- Clubs
- Pub workers
- Ambulances & Paramedics
- Health Workers
- Fitness and gym workers
- Logistics and supermarket supply
- Manufacturing
- Market research & call centre workers
- Sales workers
- Tourism
- Veterinary, zoos & animal care
- Laundries
- Sports & entertainment workers

== Politics ==
During the 2020 recession, the UWU pushed for "a universal income of $740 a week" and a "jobs guarantee".
