= Unions NSW =

Peak body for trade unions in New South Wales, Australia

- Founded: 1871; 155 years ago
- Headquarters: Sydney, New South Wales
- Location: Australia
- Members: 600,000
- Key people: Thomas John Costa, Secretary; Todd Pinkerton, Assistant Secretary; Vanessa Seagrove, Assistant Secretary
- Affiliations: ACTU
- Website: www.unionsnsw.org.au

Unions NSW, is the peak body for trade unions in the state of New South Wales, Australia. As of 2005 there are 67 unions and eight rural and regional Trades & Labor Councils affiliated to the Labor Council, representing 800,000 workers in NSW. It is registered as the State Peak Council of Employees under Section 215 of the Industrial Relations Act 1996 (NSW). The council is affiliated with the Australian Council of Trade Unions (ACTU).

== History ==
The Labor Council was formed by six unions in 1871, and originally called the Trades & Labor Council of Sydney. The council experienced rapid growth during its early history, with the number of affiliated unions tripling between 1885 and 1890, and total membership reaching 35,000 in that year, or 60% of union members in the Colony of New South Wales. By 1891, 21.5% of all employees in the colony were union members, making it the most organised workforce in the world. Union organisation in the colony suffered badly during the economic depression of the 1890s, due to high unemployment, aggressive anti-union policies of employers and a number of large, unsuccessful strikes including the 1890 Australian maritime dispute and the 1891 Australian shearers strike.

In 1894, the Trades & Labor Council of Sydney changed its name to the Sydney District of Australasian Labour Federation. In 1900, it again changed its name to the Sydney Labor Council, changing again eight years later to the Labor Council of New South Wales. In 2005, it adopted the brand name UnionsNSW for all public purposes, but retained the official name Labor Council of New South Wales.

== Responsibilities ==
The Labor Council of New South Wales is responsible for:

- implementing Australian Council of Trade Unions policy within New South Wales
- co-ordinating union activities and campaigns, involving more than one union
- providing assistance with research, negotiations and advocacy to affiliated organisations
- lobbying State Parliament for social and industrial reforms
- providing a public point of contact for general enquiries on New South Wales unions
- management of the Sydney Trades Hall, which was transferred in 2002 to the Labor Council from the original trustees, the Trades Hall Association.

== Labor Council Secretaries ==
No	Name	Year	Union
1	W. M. Ford	1871	
2	Thomas White	1872	Seamen's Union of Australia
3	Angus Cameron	1873	Progressive Society of Carpenters and Joiners
4	Thomas White	1873	Seamen's Union of Australia
5	Frank B. Dixon	1873	Operative Stonemasons' Society
6	Angus Cameron	1874	Progressive Society of Carpenters and Joiners
7	Edward I. Aiken	1874	
8	T. H. Hall	1876	
9	W. Helstey	1880	
10	William R. Roylance	1880	Operative Stonemasons' Society
11	J. E. West	1883	Operative Plumbers' Society
12	Frank B. Dixon	1883	Operative Stonemasons' Society
13	Thomas Symons	1884	
14	James J. Cronin	1887	New South Wales Saddle, Harness and Collar Makers' Protective Society
15	Thomas J. Houghton	1888	New South Wales Typographical Association
16	John Riddell	1894	Operative Stonemasons' Society
17	J. P. Cochran	1894	United Labourers Union
18	T. H. Thrower	1903	United Furniture Trade Society
19	J. P. Cochran	1904	United Labourers' Union
20	E. J. Kavanagh	1910	Pressers Union of New South Wales
21	J. S. (Jock) Garden	1918	Operative Sailmakers' Society
22	J. Howie	1922	Federated Coopers of Australia
23	J. S. (Jock) Garden	1923	Operative Sailmakers' Society
24	Robert Arthur King	1934	Australian Saddlery Trades Employees' Federation
25	James Kenny	1958	Australian Glass Workers' Union
26	Ralph Marsh	1967	Boilermakers' Society of Australia
27	John Ducker	1975	Federated Ironworkers' Association
28	Barrie Unsworth	1979	Electrical Trades Union
29	John MacBean	1984	Electrical Trades Union
30	Michael Easson	1989	
31	Peter Sams	1994	Australian Workers' Union
32	Michael Costa	1998	Australian Federated Union of Locomotive Enginemen
33	John Robertson	2001	Electrical Trades Union
34	Mark Lennon	2008	
35	Mark Morey	2016	Australian Rail Tram and Bus Industry Union
36	Thomas Costa	2026	Australian Rail Tram and Bus Industry Union

== See also ==
- Unions ACT
- Victorian Trades Hall Council
