= Anthony D'Adam =

Member of the New South Wales Legislative Council

The Honourable Anthony D'Adam MLC
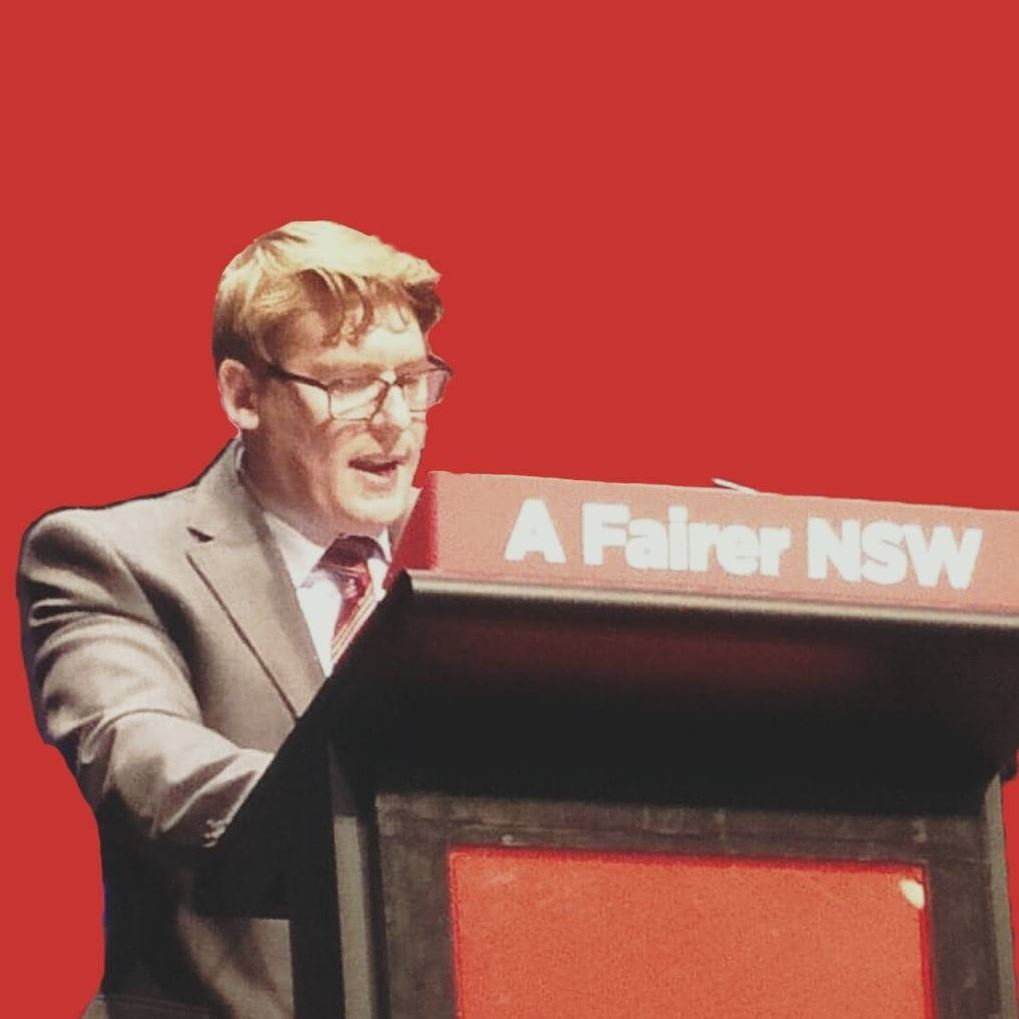
- D'Adam in 2023

Member of the New South Wales Legislative Council
- Incumbent
- Assumed office 23 March 2019

Personal details
- Party: Australian Labor Party

Anthony Gerard Damien D'Adam is an Australian politician. He has been a member of the New South Wales Legislative Council since 2019, representing the Australian Labor Party.

D'Adam was a Labor Party branch secretary in the Auburn electorate and was a former campaign manager for Luke Foley during his campaign for the New South Wales Legislative Assembly seat of Auburn. He is a member of the NSW Left faction and a prominent advocate for Palestine within the Australian Labor Party.

== Political career ==
=== Trade union career ===
Prior to entering Parliament, D'Adam worked for three trade unions: The Forestry and Furnishing Products Division of the Construction, Forestry, Maritime, Mining, and Energy Union, the Public Service Association of NSW, and the Media, Entertainment and Arts Alliance. D'Adam supported a Picket line at New South Wales Parliament House as part of the Public Service Association of NSW's campaign against the Labor Government's changes to the worker compensation scheme. D'Adam cited his experience in the picket-line and other non-violent civil disobedience campaigns in a speech criticising the Roads and Crimes Legislation Amendment Bill 2022.

=== Labor Party involvement ===
D'Adam is a member of the NSW Labor Left Faction. D'Adam publicly supported the attempts of Prime Minister Kevin Rudd and Senator John Faulkner to reform NSW Labor in 2013 in the wake of the Craig Thompson Affair and Independent Commission Against Corruption investigations concerning NSW Labor figures Eddie Obeid, Joe Tripodi, and Ian Macdonald.

In 2019, D'Adam called on NSW Labor to abolish its General Secretary position following the revelation that the incumbent General Secretary, Kaila Murnain, was aware of an illegal $100,000 donation to the party from billionaire property-developer Huang Xiangmo.

In 2020, D'Adam expressed concern that the structure of the Labor Party is leading to the collapse of rank-and-file participation and ultimately the Pasokification of the party. Following the resignation of NSW Labor Leader Jodi McKay in May 2021, D'Adam published an opinion piece in The Sydney Morning Herald calling on NSW Labor to conduct a rank-and-file ballot between the presumptive leadership candidates, Michael Daley and Chris Minns.

D'Adam is a founding editor of Unprecedented Times Magazine, a Labor Party publication associated with Democratic socialism.

At the 2023 Australian Labor Party National Conference, D'Adam moved a motion opposing Australia's participation in the AUKUS security partnership.

=== Parliamentary career ===
As a Member of the NSW Legislative Council, D'Adam has supported progressing social reforms including the legalisation of abortion in 2019 and the proposed legalisation of Voluntary euthanasia in March 2022. D'Adam opposed Mark Latham's Education Legislation Amendment (Parental Rights) Bill 2020. D'Adam echoed the position of LGBTIQ+ rights groups, the NSW Council for Civil Liberties, and the New South Wales Teachers Federation who condemned the proposed legislation as an attack on trans and gender diverse students in NSW Public Schools. In a dissenting statement attached to the final report of a Legislative Council inquiry into the Bill, D'Adam argued that the legislation would "do real and lasting damage to our education system".

D'Adam has been critical of international human rights abuses and the rise of Far-right politics including the normalisation of "anti‑Semitism, Islamophobia, and increasing hostility to the LGBTQI community". In his inaugural speech, D'Adam linked his opposition to the far-right with the fact that his family came to Australia as political refugees following the rise of Benito Mussolini's regime in Italy. In March 2022, D'Adam cited a report by the Islamic Sciences and Research Academy of Australia which related rising instances of Islamophobia with the normalisation of racism in the wake of the Christchurch mosque shootings. In a speech to Parliament, D'Adam argued that "Fascism has always preyed on the fears and discontents of alienated people to undermine and destabilise democratic institutions and erode social cohesion". D'Adam has spoken outside Parliament at community forums concerning the rise of the far-right and has celebrated the Anti-fascist activities of Arthur Rae.

==== Civil liberties ====
Despite being bound by the rules of NSW Labor to support the caucus position on the Roads and Crimes Legislation Amendment Bill 2022, D'Adam spoke against the legislation along with his Labor colleagues Peter Primrose and Shaoquett Moselmane. D'Adam argued that the penalties enshrined in the legislation for nonviolent protest — including up to two years in jail and $22,000 fines — are "not proportionate" to the disruption caused by the Blockade Australia activists it notionally targets. Further, D'Adam argued against the bill on the basis that it could be used to imprison people who participate in socially progressive forms of protest. D'Adam observed that the legislation criminalises tactics adopted by participants in the Selma to Montgomery marches and by "suffragettes [who] chained themselves to Parliament House in a form of direct action not dissimilar to the kinds of direct action the bill is trying to criminalise". D'Adam contradicted his Left Factional counterparts Penny Sharpe, Rose Jackson, and John Graham who spoke in favour of the legislation. The legislation has since been applied to arrest pro-Palestinian protestors.

In March 2024, D'Adam and other soft-left Members of Parliament opposed new penalties and bail restrictions that target youth crime in the NSW Labor caucus.

==== Israel-Palestine ====
D'Adam is an advocate for the rights of Palestinian People within the Labor Party and NSW Parliament. During the 2021 Israel–Palestine crisis, D'Adam criticised the Israeli military and spoke in support of the Arab Australian Federation's Statement on Anti-Palestinianism.

Throughout the Israeli invasion of the Gaza Strip (2023–present), D'Adam has publicly called on the Israeli government and the international community to implement an "immediate ceasefire".

During his career in the Labor Party, D'Adam has supported structural reforms which prioritise rank-and-file democracy over "the centralisation of authority".

Prior to his election in 2019, D'Adam was a long-term member of the NSW Labor Administrative Committee. On 19 October 2023, D'Adam signed an open letter which condemned attacks against Israeli and Palestinian civilians. On 22 November 2023, D'Adam called on the Australian Government "to use its influence to end the Israeli occupation of Palestinian territory".

In December 2023, D'Adam organised an open letter with Greens MP Jenny Leong that called on the Albanese government to 're-examine its relationship with Israel' in light of Palestinian civilian casualties. 203 Australian politicians signed the letter including 11 Labor members of the NSW Government and the state's former Labor Premier, Bob Carr. On 9 January 2024, the Australian Palestinian Advocacy Network endorsed the letter, noting that the number of signatories had increased to 317.

D'Adam's comments during the Gaza conflict have been a source of controversy for Premier Chris Minns who has attempted to ban pro-Palestine protests.

On 15 May 2024 D'Adam made a speech that criticised the conduct of New South Wales Police towards participants in pro-Palestinian rallies. Premier Chris Minns dismissed D'Adam from his role as the parliamentary secretary for youth justice after he refused to withdraw his remarks. In October 2024, D'Adam described a proposal by Minns that would empower police to ban protests as 'incredibly dangerous'. In early August 2025, D'Adam attended the March for Humanity in Sydney, a large protest highlighting the plight of Palestinians in the Gaza conflict. In a caucus meeting D'Adam criticised Minns' position on the Gaza war and the premier's opposition to the weekend protest on the issue. Later, D'Adam in a parliamentary speech said he was bullied and gaged in caucus by other Labor representatives who sought to shut down discussion on Palestine and the protest.

During debate on the Terrorism and Other Legislation Amendment Bill 2025 introduced in the wake of the Bondi shooting, D'Adam spoke out against the bill's aims, stating that an attempt to constrain chants in protests was "a fool's errand".

==== Other international issues ====
In a 2021 speech commemorating The Tamil Genocide by Sri Lanka, D'Adam called on the Australian government to consider implementing Magnitsky legislation to target perpetrators of human rights abuses.
