= Roads and Crimes Legislation Amendment Act 2022 =

New South Wales legislation

Parliament of New South Wales
- Long title: An Act to amend the Roads Act 1993 and the Crimes Act 1900 to create offences for certain behaviour that causes damage or disruption to major roads or major public facilities; and for other purposes.
- Citation: Act No. 7, 2022
- Considered by: New South Wales Legislative Assembly
- Considered by: New South Wales Legislative Council
- Royal assent: 1 April 2022

Legislative history

First chamber: New South Wales Legislative Assembly
- Introduced by: Mark Speakman MP, Attorney General
- First reading: 30 March 2022
- Second reading: 30 March 2022
- Third reading: 30 March 2022

Second chamber: New South Wales Legislative Council
- Member(s) in charge: Natalie Ward MLC, Minister for Women's Safety and the Prevention of Domestic and Sexual Violence
- First reading: 31 March 2022
- Second reading: 31 March 2022
- Third reading: 1 April 2022

Amends
- Crimes Act 1900; Roads Act 1993
- Status: In force

The Roads and Crimes Legislation Amendment Act 2022 is an act of the Parliament of New South Wales which amended the Crimes Act 1900 and the Roads Act 1993 to create new criminal penalties for protest activities.

== Background ==
The incumbent Liberal-National Coalition Government introduced the Bill on 30 March 2022 to curtail the use of Non-violent direct action tactics by climate change protestors. The Parliament passed the Bill in the context of repeated disruptions to peak hour traffic on the Spit Bridge by Fireproof Australia activists and the use of Lock-on devices at Port Botany and in the Hunter Region by Blockade Australia.

== Legislative process ==
The NSW Greens and Animal Justice Party attempted to filibuster the bill in the New South Wales Legislative Council; however, the government ultimately passed the legislation with the support of the NSW Labor opposition.

In exchange for Opposition support for the Bill, NSW Labor Leader Chris Minns negotiated an amendment to exempt participants in industrial activity from new criminal penalties.

== Effect ==
The Bill makes it an offence to cause "damage or disruption to major roads or major public facilities". People found guilty of these new offences are liable for fines of up to $22,000 "or imprisonment for 2 years, or both". The Bill also empowers the responsible Government Minister to designate any road or public facility as a 'major road' or 'major infrastructure facility' by regulation.

== Controversy ==
Thirty-nine organisations signed an open letter condemning the Bill on 31 March 2022. Signatories of the letter included the Aboriginal Legal Service (NSW/ACT), Amnesty International, the Australian Council of Social Service, the Australian Youth Climate Coalition, Community Legal Centres NSW, Friends of the Earth Australia, Greenpeace, and the Human Rights Law Centre. The letter argued that: "Everyone from school kids marching for climate action to anti-war protestors would run the risk of incurring these penalties when they set out on a march. Such laws are incompatible with the democratic right to protest and our fundamental civil liberties". Some described the law as repressive that empowers the government and police further against protesting citizens. The act of establishing a strike force to get to protestors before they even protest was mentioned as an example.

The NSW Council for Civil Liberties, Human Rights Law Centre, Environmental Defender's Office NSW, Australian Democracy Network, and Reverend Tim Costello also issued a joint press release criticising the Bill as an attempt "to rush through a draconian anti-protest law, which could see peaceful community protesters jailed for up to two years".

Opposition support for the Bill was also contentious within the Labor Party and trade union movement. Despite the controversial nature of the proposed legislation, prominent Labor Party figures spoke in favour of the reform. Labor Left representative, Rose Jackson, stated that she supported the new penalties "...being used to target rogue individuals who completely disrupt peak hour traffic on the Spit Bridge, on our ports...". Senior Left Faction figure, John Graham, also expressed support for increased criminal penalties for protests affecting 'major bridges and tunnels', arguing that "We do not support the Blockade Australia Protests because they are violent economic blockades". Chris Minns echoed accusations of violence in an interview on 1 April 2022, stating that: "These are guerrilla activities designed to disrupt millions of people from going about their daily work and something needs to be done about it". Coalition and Labor representatives have controversially claimed that Blockade Australia protestors are engaged in 'violent' activities despite the non-violent nature of the protests at Port Botany and on the Spit Bridge.

Despite the majority of NSW Labor members supporting the Bill in a caucus meeting, the position adopted by Chris Minns and his Shadow cabinet was controversial amongst some back-bench opposition MPs. Three Labor member of the New South Wales Legislative Council spoke against the Bill including Anthony D'Adam, Peter Primrose, and Shaoquett Moselmane. All three MPs cited their experience in Nonviolent civil disobedience in their contributions to the Second Reading debate. D'Adam argued that the legislation would impose "disproportionate" criminal penalties on protestors who engage in tactics akin to those used during the Selma to Montgomery marches and by Australian suffragettes. NSW Greens MLC David Shoebridge echoed this sentiment, arguing that the Bill would see labour movement hero, Jack Mundey, imprisoned for his participation in the Green bans. Despite the contentious nature of the legislation, all Labor representatives ultimately voted in favour of the legislation given the binding pledge of the party.
