= Rose Jackson =

Australian politician (born 1985)

The Honourable Rose Jackson MLC
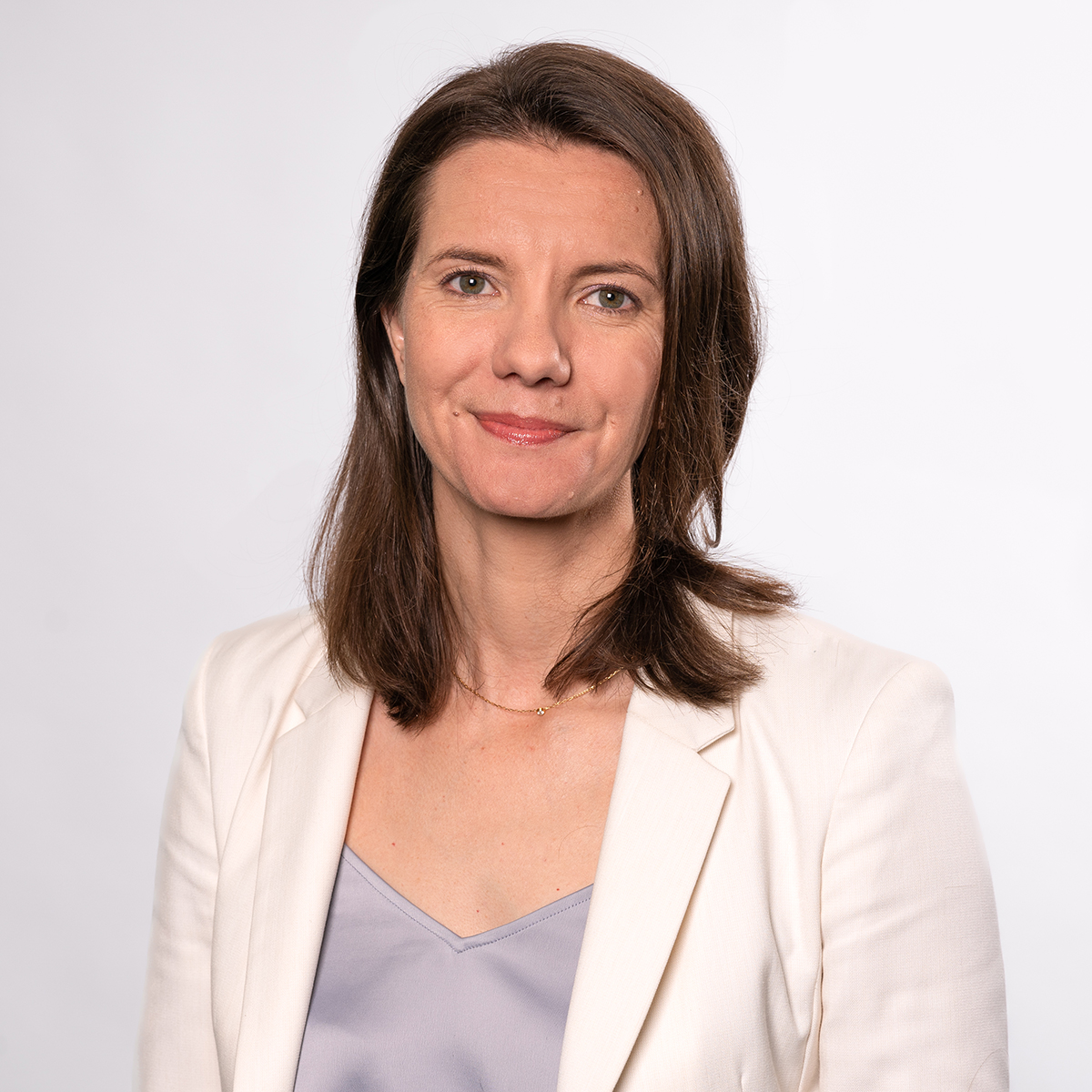

Minister for Water Minister for Mental Health
- Incumbent
- Assumed office 5 April 2023
- Premier: Chris Minns
- Preceded by: Kevin Anderson

Minister for Housing Minister for Homelessness
- Incumbent
- Assumed office 5 April 2023
- Premier: Chris Minns
- Preceded by: Anthony Roberts

Member of the New South Wales Legislative Council
- Incumbent
- Assumed office 8 May 2019
- Preceded by: Lynda Voltz

Councillor of Waverley Council for Lawson Ward
- In office 13 September 2008 – 8 September 2012

Personal details
- Born: January 1985 (age 41)
- Party: Labor Party
- Education: University of Sydney

Rose Butler Jackson (born January 1985) is an Australian Labor Party politician serving as a Member of the New South Wales Legislative Council since 8 May 2019. Since 5 April 2023, she has been serving in the Minns ministry as Minister for Water, Minister for Housing, Minister for Homelessness, Minister for Mental Health, Minister for Youth, and Minister for the North Coast. She is the former Assistant General Secretary of NSW Labor.

Jackson is a former Secretary of the New South Wales Labor Left faction and associated with the majority hard-left subfaction within Labor Left.

As a member of the NSW Labor Parliamentary Caucus, Jackson has called on the party to implement drug law reform including the legalisation of cannabis. Jackson has also called for strong industrial relations reform, like criminalising wage theft, and criminal justice reform in NSW.

== Early life and education ==
Jackson is the daughter of the late Australian Broadcasting Corporation journalist Liz Jackson and film maker Martin Butler.

Jackson grew up in the Eastern Suburbs of Sydney, attended Newtown High School of the Performing Arts and graduated with a Bachelor of Economic and Social Sciences and a Bachelor of Laws from the University of Sydney.

== Student politics ==
Jackson was heavily involved in Labor Left student politics. She was originally a member of the Sydney University Socialist Left faction, which was an affiliate of the National Organisation of Labor Students (NOLS). In 2005 she served as President of the University of Sydney Students' Representative Council, where she gained national prominence for her part in organising the student campaign against the Howard government's Voluntary student unionism laws.

In 2006, Jackson successfully advocated to re-unify both major Labor Left student factions, NOLS and the Victorian-based Australian Labor Students, and subsequently became the first National Labor Students President of the National Union of Students.

After her involvement in student politics, she became the President of Young Labor Left and a member of the Young Labor State Executive. During this time she worked as a political staffer for state Minister for Education Verity Firth.

== Career ==
Jackson was selected to fill the casual vacancy in the NSW state upper house, the NSW Legislative Council following Lynda Voltz's election to the NSW Legislative Assembly for the seat of Auburn and was appointed on 8 May 2019.

In 2020, Jackson called for an end to the private prison system in NSW and criticised past Governments for privatising prisons.

In 2020, Jackson publicly announced her support for the legalisation of cannabis in NSW. Jackson was the first NSW Labor MP to support the legalisation of cannabis after the ACT decriminalised cannabis.

On 11 June 2021, Jackson was appointed as the Shadow Minister for Water, Housing and Homelessness. As the responsible Shadow Minister, Jackson opposed a motion moved by the NSW Greens which would have temporarily banned the eviction of tenants in coastal communities during the COVID-19 Crisis. Jackson supported a Coalition amendment to the Greens' proposal which removed the proposal to ban evictions in coastal areas on the basis that restricting the rights of landlords would "throw that market into chaos weeks before the holiday season".

== Controversies ==
On 21 November 2007, it was alleged Jackson had "espoused anti-Zionism" during her tenure in the NUS. The Australian reported on its front page a leaked email which Jackson had addressed to "Dear Activists", stating "I oppose Zionism because it calls for the creation of a Jewish state, and I think all governments should be secular". The incident attracted significant media coverage because of Jackson's role as a staffer for candidate George Newhouse whose electorate of Wentworth has the highest Jewish population of any in Australia. The Australian Jewish News said Jackson's comments "attacked the heart and soul of every Jewish voter". Jackson said she had not understood the definition of Zionism at the time she wrote the email, saying "I support Israel." In 2014, Jackson toured Israel as part of the first Australia Israel Labor Dialogue study mission.

In September 2008, Jackson was elected as a Councillor to Waverley local council. She also gained media attention in 2008 following her appearance on the ABC's Q&A program during which she confused the concept of Pavlovian conditioning for pavlova, a type of dessert.

Jackson supported the controversial Roads and Crimes Legislation Amendment Bill 2022 which made it an offence for protestors to cause "damage or disruption to major roads or major public facilities". The Coalition Government introduced the Bill in light of the increased use of non-violent direct action by members of Blockade Australia to disrupt logistics infrastructure at Port Botany. Under the new legislation, individuals found guilty of disrupting 'major roads' or 'major infrastructure' are liable for fines of up to $22,000 "or imprisonment for 2 years, or both". In her Second Reading speech, Jackson argued that the new criminal penalties were necessary "...to target rogue individuals who completely disrupt peak hour traffic on the Spit Bridge, [and] on our ports...". Jackson supported the legislation despite widespread opposition from civil liberties organisations including Amnesty International, The Australian Youth Climate Coalition, The Human Rights Law Centre, Environmental Defender's Office NSW, and the NSW Council for Civil Liberties.

On 12 November 2024, Jackson sparked controversy during an interview on ABC Radio Sydney regarding rental and housing affordability. When asked by presenter Hamish Macdonald about what would be a reasonable price for a two-bedroom flat in Sydney, Jackson initially suggested that such a property could be rented for "a couple of hundred bucks" a week. However, when pressed further on where in Sydney this could be possible, she clarified that it depended on the location, noting that there is significant variety in the housing market. In a later press conference, Jackson explained that her previous remarks were "garbled" and not reflective of actual rental prices in Sydney.

In January 2025, in her role as Minister for Mental Health, Jackson presided over an industrial dispute with psychiatrists employed by NSW Health. The dispute arose during regular salary negotiations between the NSW Government and the union for psychiatrists in public hospitals, the Australian Salaried Medical Officers' Federation (ASMOF). ASMOF demanded a 25% pay increase for staff to bring their salaries in line with equivalent roles in other Australian states. The union argued that pay increases would help attract staff at a time where between 30% and 40% of the 443 psychiatrist positions at NSW Health were vacant. 203 of the state's 295 psychiatrists threatened to resign when Jackson rejected ASMOF's demand, instead offering a 10.5% pay increase over three years, claiming that the original request would cost $700 million The NSW Government tried to expedite the dispute by referring it to the Industrial Relations Commission of New South Wales for compulsory arbitration. 43 of psychiatrists resigned triggering the temporary closure of 60 mental health beds in NSW. It was later shown that the $700 million cost for the 25% pay increases was incorrect, and internal documents from the NSW Health's chief medical advisor showed the cost would be $25 million.

In February 2025, Jackson was named as one of the participants in an Australia Day winery tour organised by NSW Transport Minister Jo Haylen, using a taxpayer-funded ministerial car and driver for a 446-kilometre trip. NSW Premier Chris Minns described the trip as a "massive error of judgement" by Haylen and Jackson and announced that he would initiate a review of the rules relating to the use of ministerial drivers for personal trips. Haylen subsequently resigned over the incident, but no action was taken against Jackson by the Minns government. Jackson refused calls for her to also resign, justifying her lapse in judgement by stating she 'wasn't really thinking' and that 'it was a kid-free weekend after long school holidays'.

In April 2026 she was involved in the Gwydir wetlands controversy. WaterNSW stopped environmental flows into the wetlands following a complaint from a landholder. The consequent drying of the wetlands lead to what conservationists termed "a disaster" with turtles and birds dying in large numbers. One said "“An environmental catastrophe is happening right now under this government’s watch. These wetlands should be thriving at this time of year, supporting thousands of migratory shorebirds and waterbirds, turtles and fish”. Cate Faehrmann, a Greens member of the NSW legislative council, said "“The water minister must issue an urgent directive that environmental water flows be restarted immediately, otherwise hundreds of turtles are going to die”. Rose Jackson said she was aware of the situation.

New South Wales Legislative Council
Preceded by Lynda Voltz	Member of the Legislative Council; 2019–present	Incumbent
Political offices
Preceded by Kevin Anderson as Minister for Lands and Water	Minister for Water; 2023–present	Incumbent
Preceded by Anthony Roberts as Minister for Homes	Minister for Housing; Minister for Homelessness; 2023–present	Incumbent
Preceded by Ryan Park	Minister for Mental Health; 2023–present	Incumbent
New title	Minister for Youth; 2023–present	Incumbent
New title	Minister for the North Coast; 2023–present	Incumbent
