= North Metropolitan =

North Metropolitan may refer to:

- Electoral region of North Metropolitan, in Western Australia
- North Metropolitan Province, former electorate in Western Australia
- North Metropolitan Region, municipality in Argentina
- Northern Metropolitan Region, electorate in Victoria, Australia
- North Metropolitan Electric Power Supply Company, electricity company in London, England
