= Minister for Mental Health (New South Wales) =

Government minister in New South Wales, Australia

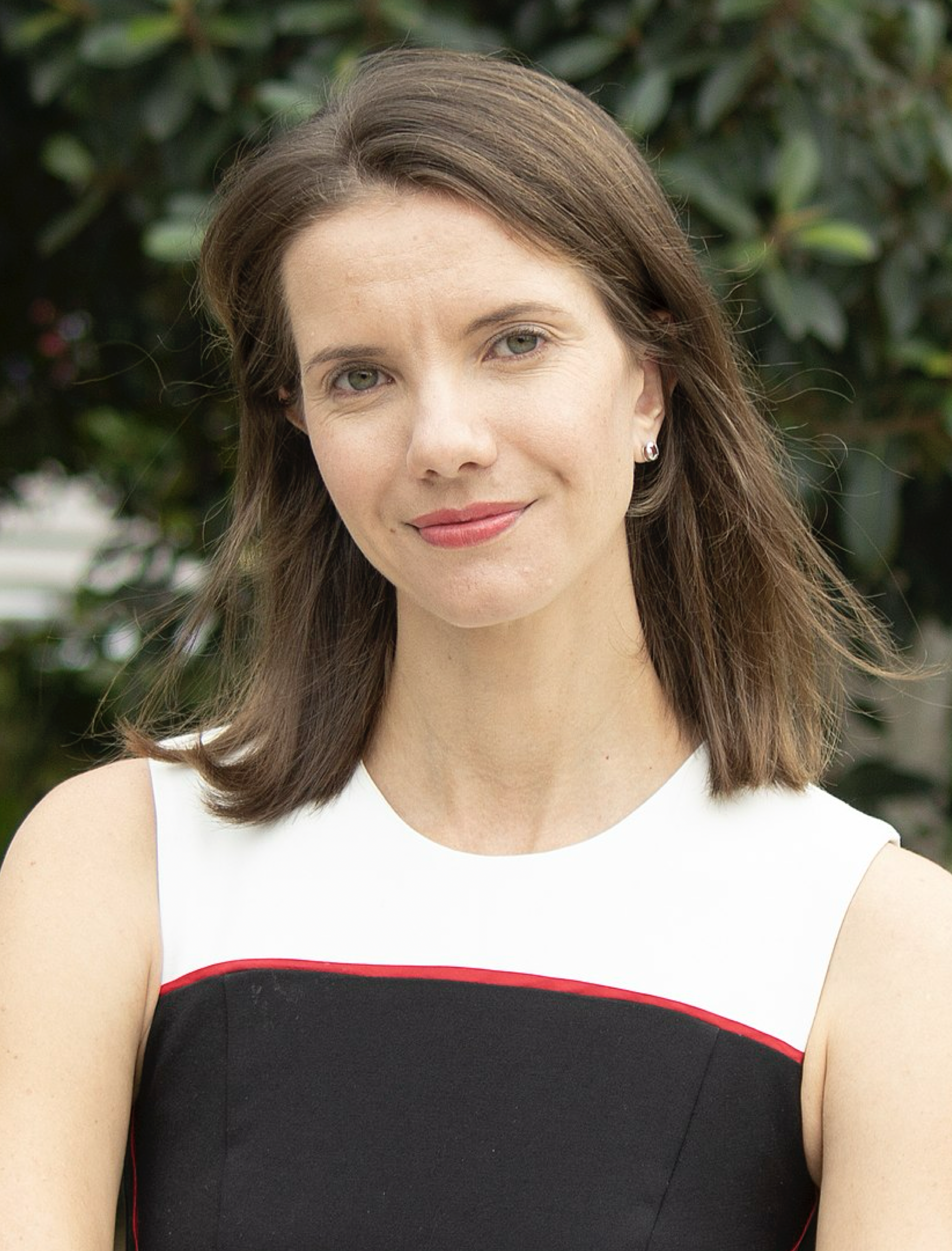
- Incumbent; Rose Jackson since 5 April 2023
- Ministry of Health
- Style: The Honourable
- Appointer: Governor of New South Wales
- Inaugural holder: Cherie Burton (as Minister Assisting the Minister for Health (Mental Health))
- Formation: 10 August 2005

The Minister for Mental Health is a minister in the New South Wales Government with responsibility for hospitals and health services in regional New South Wales, Australia.

It was first established in 2005 in the First Iemma ministry as an assistant minister, before becoming a separate portfolio in 2011 in the O'Farrell ministry. The portfolio was not tasked with the management of a department.

The current minister is Rose Jackson since April 2023. Together with the Minister for Health, Minister for Regional Health and Minister for Medical Research, they administer the health portfolio through the Health cluster, including the Ministry of Health and a range of other government agencies, including local health districts and the NSW Ambulance service.

== List of ministers ==
Title	Minister	Party	Ministry	Term start	Term end	Time in office	Notes
Minister for Mental Health	Kevin Humphries	National	O'Farrell	4 April 2011	17 April 2014	3 years, 13 days	
Minister for Mental Health	Jai Rowell	Liberal	Baird (1)	17 April 2014	2 April 2015	350 days	
Minister for Mental Health	Pru Goward	Liberal	Baird (2)	2 April 2015	23 January 2017	1 year, 296 days	
Minister for Mental Health	Tanya Davies	Liberal	Berejiklian (1)	30 January 2017	23 March 2019	2 years, 52 days	
Minister for Mental Health, Regional Youth and Women	Bronnie Taylor	National	Berejiklian (2); Perrottet (1)	2 April 2019	21 December 2021	3 years, 360 days	
Minister for Mental Health	Bronnie Taylor	National	Perrottet (2)	21 December 2021	28 March 2023	3 years, 360 days	
Minister for Mental Health	Ryan Park	Labor	Minns	28 March 2023	5 April 2023	8 days	
Minister for Mental Health	Rose Jackson	Labor	Minns	5 April 2023	incumbent	3 years, 227 days	

=== Assistant ministers ===
Title	Minister	Party	Ministry	Term start	Term end	Time in office	Notes
Minister Assisting the Minister for Health (Mental Health)	Cherie Burton	Labor	Iemma (1)	10 August 2005	2 April 2007	1 year, 235 days	
Minister Assisting the Minister for Health (Mental Health)	Paul Lynch	Labor	Iemma (2)	2 April 2007	5 September 2008	1 year, 156 days	
Minister Assisting the Minister for Health (Mental Health)	Barbara Perry	Labor	Rees	8 September 2008	14 September 2009	2 years, 201 days	
Minister Assisting the Minister for Health (Mental Health and Cancer)	Barbara Perry	Labor	Rees	14 September 2009	8 December 2009	2 years, 201 days	
Minister Assisting the Minister for Health (Mental Health)	Barbara Perry	Labor	Keneally	8 December 2009	28 March 2011	2 years, 201 days	

== See also ==
- Minister for Mental Health and Ageing (Australia)
  - Minister for Mental Health (Western Australia)
  - Minister for Mental Health (Victoria)
