= Labor Left =

Organised faction of the Australian Labor Party

- Abbreviation: LL
- National Convenors: Karen Grogan; Sharon Claydon
- Newspaper: Challenge Magazine
- Ideology: Democratic socialism; Progressivism; Historical: Left-wing populism
- National affiliation: Australian Labor
- Colours: Red
- Seats in the House of Representatives: 48 / 150
- Federal Parliamentary Caucus: 63 / 124
- Queensland Parliamentary Caucus: 16 / 36
- Western Australia Parliamentary Caucus: 42 / 75
- New South Wales Parliamentary Caucus: 20 / 60

Website
- QLD Branch website NSW Branch website Young Labor Left website

The Labor Left (LL), also known as the Progressive Left, Socialist Left or simply the Left, is one of the two major political factions within the Australian Labor Party (ALP). It is generally characterised by its advocacy of socially progressive and democratic socialist policies, and competes with the Labor Right faction. The incumbent Prime Minister, Anthony Albanese, is a Labor Left member.

The Labor Left operates autonomously in each state and territory of Australia, and organises as a broad alliance at the national level. Its policy positions include party democratisation, economic interventionism, progressive tax reform, refugee rights, gender equality and same-sex marriage. The faction includes members with a range of political perspectives, including Keynesianism, confrontational trade unions, Fabian social democracy, New Leftism, and democratic socialism.

== Factional activity ==
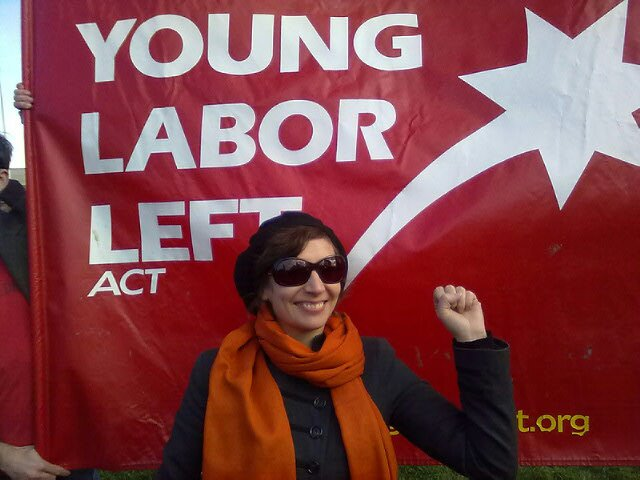
An activist from the Young Labor Left in 2011

Most political parties contain informal factions of members who work towards common goals, however, the Australian Labor Party is noted for having highly structured and organised factions across the ideological spectrum.

Labor Left is a membership-based organisation which has internal office bearers, publications, and policy positions. The faction coordinates political activity and policy development across different hierarchical levels and organisational components of the party, negotiates with other factions on political strategy and policy, and uses party processes to try to defeat other groups if consensus cannot be reached.

Many members of parliament and trade union leaders are formally aligned with the Left and Right factions, and party positions and ministerial allocations are negotiated and divided between the factions based on the proportion of Labor caucus aligned with that faction.

== History ==
=== Factions before the 1950s ===
Historian Frank Bongiorno has noted that there had been several organisations associated with the left wing of Labor before the 1950s, from the Australian Socialist League in the 1890s, the industrial left which emerged during World War I, the early supporters of Jack Lang, and the State Labor Party of the 1940s.

=== Split in 1955 ===
The modern Labor Left emerged from the Labor Party split of 1955, in which anti-communist activists associated with B. A. Santamaria and the Industrial Groups formed the Democratic Labor Party while left-wing parliamentarians and unions loyal to H. V. Evatt and Arthur Calwell remained in the Australian Labor Party. The earliest formal factional organization was the NSW Combined Unions and Branches Steering Committee (later known as the NSW Socialist Left), which was formed in January 1955.

The split played out differently across the country, with anti-communists leaving the party in Victoria and Queensland but remaining within in most other states. This created a power vacuum which allowed the Left to take control of the Federal Executive and Victorian state branch, while its opponents were preserved elsewhere. Tom Uren described the left of the Labor Party Caucus upon his election to Parliament in the late 1950s as "a loosely knit grouping ... consist[ing] mostly of anti-Catholics, although some members were militants or socialists".

From 1965, organised internal groups emerged to challenge the control of the Left, supported by figures such as John Button and Gough Whitlam. After the Victorian branch lost the 1970 state election in the midst of a public dispute with Whitlam over state aid for private schools, the South Australian Left, led by Clyde Cameron, and New South Wales Left, led by Arthur Gietzelt, agreed to support an intervention which saw the Victorian state branch abolished and subsequently reconstructed without Left control. Leftists in the Victorian party subsequently regrouped as the formally organized Socialist Left faction. In Queensland, the left coalesced around senator George Georges. Despite an increasing level of organisation in the grassroots party, this was not reflected within the Parliamentary caucus: Ken Fry noted that when he was elected to Parliament in 1974, meetings of left MPs were irregular and they responded to events in an ad hoc manner. The Labor Left suffered the loss of two of its key leaders in the mid-1970s with the downfall of Jim Cairns and the elevation of Lionel Murphy to the High Court of Australia, yet it continued to make advances in terms of nationwide organisation: right-wing power broker Graham Richardson has acknowledged that "at the beginning of the 1980s the Left was the only national faction".

=== Split in the 1980s ===
Labor leftists continued to formalise their organisation into the 1980s. In New South Wales, the Steering Committee (which later became known as the Socialist Left in 1989) made advances in branches across the state in the late 1970s and early 1980s under the leadership of Peter Baldwin, initially in the suburbs of Sydney before spreading to the inner cities. This culminated in the deselection of the right-aligned MP for Sydney, Les McMahon, and the selection of Baldwin as Labor candidate for the seat. This was followed by other Labor Right MPs in Sydney's Inner West similarly being usurped by left candidates.

In Tasmania, the Broad Left formalised itself in 1983, having taken control of the state party after reforms democratised it in 1976. In the Australian Capital Territory, the Left Caucus was founded after a left candidate was not preselected in 1982. However, the Left was unable to translate their organisational advances into a presence in the Hawke government: although about a third of the Parliamentary caucus were aligned with the Left at the time, only one member was appointed to Hawke's first cabinet, Stewart West: leading left-winger Brian Howe placed high in the ministry ballot, but was relegated to a junior ministerial position. This came against the background of an increasing factionalising across the party and the emergence of a centre-left faction which joined with the Labor Right to dominate the Hawke government. Left influence was also restricted by the ALP's binding pledge committing legislators to accept caucus discipline, allowing members little freedom to dissent. Left influence also declined at the national conference, with the faction losing its conference majority in the early 1980s.

During the 1980s, prolonged disputes over tactical issues and personality conflicts resulted in a split occurring within the New South Wales Labor Left, creating two sub-factional groupings; the 'Hard Left' and the 'Soft Left', the latter of which was the successor of the Baldwinites. A significant event which caused the split was the election of the Secretary Assistant of the New South Wales Labor Party, where the Hard Left faction supported Anthony Albanese while the Soft Left faction supported Jan Burnswoods. The Hard Left faction was more closely aligned with left-wing groups external to the Labor Party, maintaining "closer links with broader left-wing groups, such as the Communist Party of Australia, People for Nuclear Disarmament and the African National Congress" as well as trade union officials, political staffers, lobbyists and student politicians, while the Soft Left's main base of support was among rank-and-file party branch members. In terms of tactics, the Hard Left favoured a top-down approach of transactional negotiation with the Labor Right, whilst the Soft Left advocated a continuation of the Baldwinite bottom-up strategy of mobilising the grassroots membership to win party positions. This difference in approach led to struggles between the two factions over candidate selections, with the Hard Left using their control over the party apparatus in tandem with sections of the Right to deselect Soft Left MPs across the state, particularly in western Sydney, Newcastle and Wollongong. For example, in Newcastle Bryce Gaudry was deselected in favour of the Right's Jodi McKay, following which about 130 members resigned or were expelled from the city's ALP branches, previously the largest in the state. The factions also had differing views on policy. While members of both the Soft and Hard Left opposed the Hawke/Keating government's privatisation of the Commonwealth Bank and Qantas, the Hard Left was seen as being more staunchly resistant to these changes.

=== Post-1990s ===
Lindsay Tanner, writing in the early 1990s, argued that the principal "axis of division" with the ALP cut across the traditional left-right divide, namely the opposition of "rationalists" and "traditionalists", with the former supporting the Prices and Incomes Accord and union mergers, and abandoning or watering down their commitment to traditional Labor objectives such as public ownership, non-interventionism in foreign policy, and maintenance of working-class living standards, whilst the latter were negative towards the Accord, opposed to union mergers, sympathetic toward economic autarky, and attached to traditional Labor policy objectives. This divide can be seen through the career of Joan Kirner, who served as Premier of Victoria between 1990 and 1992 and was the first member of the modern Labor Left to lead a government, who supported the ascent of Paul Keating to the post of Prime Minister and his decision to privatise Commonwealth Bank to finance a bailout for the ailing State Bank of Victoria. This resulted in the formation of a splinter group from the Socialist Left, the Pledge faction, which opposed privatisation: in 1996, Pledge allied with another left split, the Labour Renewal Alliance, and the right-wing Labor Unity faction to take control of the party away from the Socialist Left.

== State factions ==
Jurisdiction	Major Left grouping	Conference floor percentage 2015	Majority
New South Wales	NSW Left	40%	No
Victoria	Victorian Socialist Left	49%	Stability pact with the TWU-SDA
Western Australia	Broad Left	84%	Yes
Queensland	The Left	49%	Yes
ACT	Left Caucus	51%	Yes
South Australia	Progressive Left Unions and Sub-Branches	35%	No
Tasmania	The Left	70%	Yes
Northern Territory	The Left	60%	Yes
National	National Left	48%	No

== Members ==
=== Federal Parliament (as of 2025) ===
Name	Seat	Other position(s)	State	Ref.
Anthony Albanese	Member for Grayndler	Prime Minister of Australia; Leader of the Labor Party	New South Wales	
Katy Gallagher	Senator for Australian Capital Territory	Minister for Finance; Minister for the Public Service; Minister for Women; Minister for Government Service; Vice-President of the Executive Council	Australian Capital Territory	
Jenny McAllister	Senator for New South Wales	Minister for the National Disability Insurance Scheme	New South Wales	
Pat Conroy	Member for Shortland	Minister for Defence Industry; Minister for Pacific Island Affairs	New South Wales	
Sharon Claydon	Member for Newcastle	Deputy Speaker of the House of Representatives	New South Wales	
Susan Templeman	Member for Macquarie	Special Envoy for the Arts	New South Wales	
Tanya Plibersek	Member for Sydney	Minister for Social Services	New South Wales	
Tim Ayres	Senator for New South Wales	Minister for Industry and Innovation; Minister for Science	New South Wales	
Malarndirri McCarthy	Senator for Northern Territory	Minister for Indigenous Australians	Northern Territory	
Nita Green	Senator for Queensland	Assistant Minister for Northern Australia; Assistant Minister for Tourism; Assistant Minister for Pacific Island Affairs	Queensland	
Murray Watt	Senator for Queensland	Minister for Environment and Water	Queensland	
Julie Collins	Member for Franklin	Minister for Agriculture, Fisheries and Forestry;	Tasmania	
Mark Butler	Member for Hindmarsh	Minister for Health and Ageing; Deputy Leader of the House; Minister for Disability and the National Disability Insurance Scheme	South Australia	
Penny Wong	Senator for South Australia	Leader of the Labor Party in the Senate; Leader of the Government in the Senate; Minister for Foreign Affairs	South Australia	
Catherine King	Member for Ballarat	Minister for Infrastructure, Transport, Regional Development, and Local Government	Victoria	
Andrew Giles	Member for Scullin	Minister for Skills and Training	Victoria	
Ged Kearney	Member for Cooper	Assistant Minister for Social Services; Assistant Minister for the Prevention of Family Violence	Victoria	
Kate Thwaites	Member for Jagajaga	Assistant Minister for Climate Change Adaption and Resilience	Victoria	
Julian Hill	Member for Bruce	Assistant Minister for Citizenship, Customs and Multicultural Affairs; Assistant Minister for International Education	Victoria	
Anne Aly	Member for Cowan	Minister for Small Business; Minister for International Development; Minister for Multicultural Affairs	Western Australia	
Patrick Gorman	Member for Perth	Assistant Minister to the Prime Minister; Assistant Minister for the Public Service; Assistant Minister for Employment and Workplace Relations	Western Australia	
Josh Wilson	Member for Fremantle	Assistant Minister for Climate Change and Energy; Assistant Minister for Agriculture, Fisheries and Forestry	Western Australia	
Sue Lines	Senator for Western Australia	President of the Senate	Western Australia	
Anne Stanley	Member for Werriwa	Government Whip	New South Wales	
Ash Ambihaipahar	Member for Barton		New South Wales	
Carol Berry	Member for Whitlam		New South Wales	
Fiona Phillips	Member for Gilmore		New South Wales	
Jerome Laxale	Member for Bennelong		New South Wales	
Zhi Soon	Member for Banks		New South Wales	
Marion Scrymgour	Member for Lingiari	Special Envoy for Remote Communities	Northern Territory	
Ali France	Member for Dickson		Queensland	
Julie-Ann Campbell	Member for Moreton		Queensland	
Kara Cook	Member for Bonner		Queensland	
Madonna Jarrett	Member for Brisbane		Queensland	
Matt Smith	Member for Leichhardt		Queensland	
Rowan Holzberger	Member for Forde		Queensland	
Renee Coffey	Member for Griffith		Queensland	
Carol Brown	Senator for Tasmania		Tasmania	
Jess Teesdale	Member for Bass		Tasmania	
Anne Urquhart	Member for Braddon		Tasmania	
Rebecca White	Member for Lyons	Assistant Minister for Health and Aged Care; Assistant Minister for Indigenous health; Assistant Minister for Women	Tasmania	
Charlotte Walker	Senator for South Australia		South Australia	
Tony Zappia	Member for Makin		South Australia	
Karen Grogan	Senator for South Australia		South Australia	
Louise Miller-Frost	Member for Boothby		South Australia	
Basem Abdo	Member for Calwell		Victoria	
Carina Garland	Member for Chisholm		Victoria	
Jo Briskey	Member for Maribyrnong		Victoria	
Joanne Ryan	Member for Lalor	Chief Government Whip	Victoria	
Jodie Belyea	Member for Dunkley		Victoria	
Libby Coker	Member for Corangamite		Victoria	
Lisa Chesters	Member for Bendigo		Victoria	
Mary Doyle	Member for Aston		Victoria	
Sarah Witty	Member for Melbourne		Victoria	
Gabriel Ng	Member for Menzies		Victoria	
Jess Walsh	Senator for Victoria	Minister for Early Childhood Education; Minister for Youth	Victoria	
Lisa Darmanin	Senator for Victoria		Victoria	
Ellie Whiteaker	Senator for Western Australia		Western Australia	
Tom French	Member for Moore		Western Australia	
Zaneta Mascarenhas	Member for Swan		Western Australia	
Trish Cook	Member for Bullwinkel		Western Australia	

=== Queensland Parliament (as of 2024) ===
Name	Seat	Other position(s)	Union	Ref.
Steven Miles	Member for Murrumba	Leader of the Opposition in Queensland	United Workers Union; Together Queensland	
Barbara O'Shea	Member for South Brisbane		United Workers Union	
Mick de Brenni	Member for Springwood	Manager of Opposition Business	United Workers Union; The Services Union	
Meaghan Scanlon	Member for Gaven	Shadow Attorney-General, Shadow Minister for Justice, Shadow Minister for Housing, Homelessness and Home Ownership	United Workers Union	
Mark Bailey	Member for Miller	Shadow Minister for Health and Ambulance Services, Shadow Minister for Mental Health	Electrical Trades Union	
Shannon Fentiman	Member for Waterford	Shadow Treasurer, Shadow Minister for Women	Australian Manufacturing Workers Union	
Peter Russo	Member for Toohey		Australian Manufacturing Workers Union; Together Queensland	
Nikki Boyd	Member for Pine Rivers	Shadow Minister for Local Government and Water, Shadow Minister for Fire, Disaster Recovery, Emergency Services and Volunteers	United Workers Union	
Chris Whiting	Member for Bancroft		Electrical Trades Union; Together Queensland	
Lance McCallum	Member for Bundamba	Shadow Minister for Energy	Electrical Trades Union; Rail Tram and Bus Union	
Glenn Butcher	Member for Gladstone	Shadow Minister for Police and Crime Prevention, Shadow Minister for Corrective Services, Shadow Minister for Sport	Australian Manufacturing Workers Union; United Workers Union	
Shane King	Member for Kurwongbah		Electrical Trades Union; Together Queensland	
Melissa McMahon	Member for Macalister		United Workers Union	
Mark Ryan	Member for Morayfield		Together Queensland	
Leeanne Enoch	Member for Algester	Shadow Minister for Closing the Gap and Reconciliation, Shadow Minister for Seniors and Disability Services, Shadow Minister for Integrity, Shadow Minister for the Arts	Together Queensland; Australian Manufacturing Workers Union	
Jennifer Howard	Member for Ipswich		The Services Union	
Corrine McMillan	Member for Mansfield	Shadow Minister for Child Safety, Communities and the Prevention of Domestic and Family Violence	Together Queensland	
Tom Smith	Member for Bundaberg	Shadow Minister for Primary Industries and Rural Development, Shadow Minister for Manufacturing	United Workers Union	

=== Western Australia Parliament (as of 2024) ===
Name	Seat	Other position(s)	Union	Ref.
Dave Kelly	Member for Bassendean		United Workers Union	
Lisa O'Malley	MLA for Bicton		United Workers Union	
Don Punch	MLA for Bunbury		AMWU	
Mark Folkard	MLA for Burns Beach		AMWU	
David Scaife	MLA for Cockburn		AMWU	
Jodie Hanns	MLA for Collie-Preston		AMWU	
Lisa Munday	MLA for Dawesville		United Workers Union	
Simone McGurk	MLA for Fremantle		United Workers Union	
Lara Dalton	MLA for Geraldton		United Workers Union	
Yaz Mubarakai	MLA for Jandakot		AMWU	
Emily Hamilton	MLA for Joondalup		United Workers Union	
Matthew Hughes	MLA for Kalamunda		United Workers Union	
Divina D'Anna	MLA for Kimberley		AMWU	
Jessica Stojkovski	MLA for Kingsley		AMWU	
Roger Cook	MLA for Kwinana	Premier of Western Australia, Minister for State Development, Minister for Public Sector Management, Minister for Federal-State Relations	United Workers Union	
David Templeman	MLA for Mandurah		AMWU	
Lisa Baker	MLA for Maylands		United Workers Union	
Meredith Hammat	MLA for Mirrabooka		United Workers Union	
Amber-Jade Sanderson	MLA for Morley		United Workers Union	
Robyn Clarke	MLA for Murray-Wellington		AMWU	
John Carey	MLA for Perth		United Workers Union	
Kevin Michel	MLA for Pilbara		AMWU	
Terry Healy	MLA for Southern River		United Workers Union	
Jessica Shaw	MLA for Swan Hills		United Workers Union	
Chris Tallentire	MLA for Thornlie		United Workers Union	
Sabine Winton	MLA for Wanneroo		United Workers Union	
Darren West	MLC for Agricultural		United Workers Union	
Shelley Payne	MLC for Agricultural		United Workers Union	
Alanna Clohesy	MLC for East Metropolitan		AMWU	
Lorna Harper	MLC for East Metropolitan		United Workers Union	
Stephen Dawson	MLC for Mining and Pastoral	Minister for Emergency Services, Minister for Innovation and the Digital Economy, Minister for Science, Minister for Medical Research, Minister assisting the Minister for State and Industry Development, Jobs and Trade	AMWU	
Peter Foster	MLC for Mining and Pastoral		AMWU	
Pierre Yang	MLC for North Metropolitan		United Workers Union	
Ayor Makur Chuot	MLC for North Metropolitan		United Workers Union	
Daniel Caddy	MLC for North Metropolitan		United Workers Union	
Sue Ellery	MLC for South Metropolitan	Minister for Finance, Minister for Commerce, Minister for Women's Interests	United Workers Union	
Klara Andric	MLC for South Metropolitan		United Workers Union	
Stephen Pratt	MLC for South Metropolitan		United Workers Union	
Sally Talbot	MLC for South West		AMWU	
Jackie Jarvis	MLC for South West		United Workers Union	

=== New South Wales Parliament (as of 2024) ===
Name	Seat	Other position(s)	Union	Sub-Faction	Ref.
Lynda Voltz	Auburn			Soft left	
Anthony D'Adam	Member of the Legislative Council			Soft left	
Nathan Hagarty	Leppington			Soft left	
Tim Crakanthorp	Newcastle			Soft left	
Cameron Murphy	Member of the Legislative Council			Soft left	
Julia Finn	Granville			Soft left	
Sonia Hornery	Wallsend			Soft left	
Charishma Kaliyanda	Liverpool			Soft left	
Kylie Wilkinson	East Hills			Soft left	
Yasmin Catley	Swansea			Hard left	
Jo Haylen	Summer Hill			Hard left	
Rose Jackson	Member of the Legislative Council			Hard left	
Trish Doyle	Blue Mountains			Hard left	
Janelle Saffin	Lismore			Hard left	
John Graham	Member of the Legislative Council			Hard left	
Liza Butler	South Coast			Hard left	
Peter Primrose	Member of the Legislative Council			Hard left	
Jodie Harrison	Charlestown			Hard left	
Penny Sharpe	Member of the Legislative Council			Hard left	

== See also ==
- Labor Right
- Ferguson Left
- Hard Left
- Australian Labor Party
