= 2015 New South Wales Labor Party leadership election =

Australian state political party election

2015 Australian Labor Party (NSW Branch) leadership election
- 5 January 2015
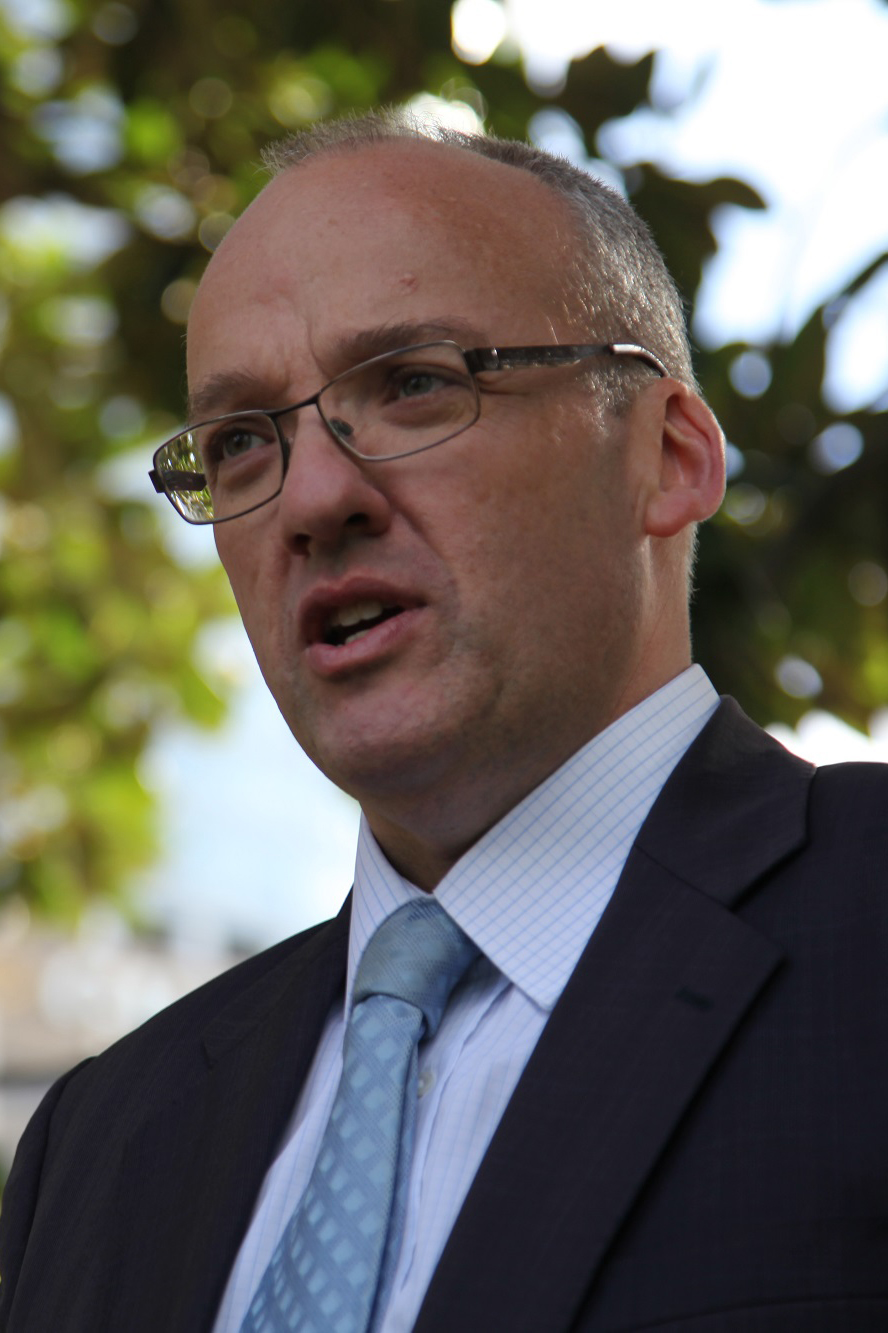
| Candidate | Luke Foley |
| Result | Unopposed |
| Seat | MLC |
Leader before election
John Robertson
(permanent leader)
Linda Burney
(interim leader)
Elected Leader
Luke Foley

An election for the leadership of the New South Wales branch of the Australian Labor Party, the party of opposition in the New South Wales, was held on 5 January 2015. The election was triggered following the resignation of Opposition Leader John Robertson on 23 December 2014.

It elected Shadow Environment Minister Luke Foley as the next parliamentary Leader of the New South Wales Labor Party and Leader of the Opposition in the lead-up to the March election, despite Foley not holding a seat in the Legislative Assembly. In the lead-up to the election, Deputy Leader Linda Burney, served as interim Leader of the Opposition and she continued to serve as Leader of the Opposition in the Legislative Assembly after the election.

== Background ==
The Liberal–National Coalition won the 2011 election in a landslide victory, reducing the parliamentary Labor party to twenty seats in the Legislative Assembly. In the aftermath, Transport Minister John Robertson was elected as leader of the Labor Party in opposition with Linda Burney appointed as his deputy. Following revelations that Robertson had sent a letter on behalf of the 2014 Sydney hostage crisis gunman, Man Haron Monis, a constituent in his Blacktown electorate, to the Department of Family and Community Services in support of Monis' request for a supervised visit with his children on Father's Day in 2011, pressure mounted on Robertson to resign as Leader of the Labor Party. Robertson announced his resignation on 23 December 2014 with the 2015 state election three months away.

The first nominee to announce their candidacy for the leadership was Shadow Treasurer Michael Daley, who was followed by Shadow Police Minister Steve Whan on 24 December.

While many within the party favoured Shadow Environment Minister Luke Foley to succeed Robertson, his position in the Legislative Council made it difficult for him to lead the parliamentary party with all Labor preselections for winnable Legislative Assembly seats already decided excepting Auburn, a seat involved in an internal dispute between incumbent MP Barbara Perry and her challenger, Auburn councillor Hicham Zraika, whom Perry accused of branch-stacking. On 29 December, Foley announced that he would contest the leadership and the Auburn pre-selection. Following Foley's announcement, Steve Whan withdrew from the race, citing insufficient support. Daley withdrew for similar reasons the following day.

== Candidates ==
- Luke Foley, Leader of the Opposition in the Legislative Council, Shadow Minister for the Environment and Climate Change and Shadow Minister for Planning and Infrastructure

=== Withdrew ===
- Michael Daley, Shadow Treasurer and Shadow Minister for Roads
- Steve Whan, Shadow Minister for Police

=== Declined ===
- Linda Burney, Interim leader, Deputy Leader of the Opposition and Shadow Minister for Family and Community Services

== Aftermath ==
Foley was elected unopposed and declared his candidacy for Labor pre-selection in the district of Auburn, then occupied by incumbent MLA Barbara Perry. Perry announced her intention to withdraw her pre-selection candidacy to make way for Foley.

== See also ==
- 2015 New South Wales state election
- Australian Labor Party leadership spill, September 2013
- 2018 Australian Labor Party (New South Wales Branch) leadership election
