= Huang Xiangmo =

Chinese billionaire real estate developer

- Born: Chaozhou, China
- Occupation: Real estate developer
- Title: CEO, Yuhu Group
- Political party: Chinese Communist Party
- Children: 2

Huang Xiangmo (Chinese: 黄向墨) is a Chinese billionaire real estate developer. He was a permanent resident and political donor in Australia, but was later barred entry into the country on national security grounds. Additionally, then Australian Prime Minister Malcolm Turnbull was advised by the Australian Security Intelligence Organisation to not attend fundraisers or events where Huang was present, due to national security concerns.

== Early life ==
Huang was born in Chaozhou, China.

== Career ==
Huang is the CEO of Yuhu Group, a Sydney property development company. Huang served as the honorary chairman of the Australian Council for the Promotion of Peaceful Reunification of China's Sixth Advisory Group.

Huang has given A$2.7 million to Australian political parties either personally or through his companies. His donations have been suspected to be on behalf of Chinese Communist Party's United Front Work Department, which were exerting influence on Australia's policies in favour of China through such political donations. After Huang's permanent residency was cancelled, a letter backing Huang, which appeared on the front pages of three Australian Chinese-language newspapers as a paid advertisement, included more than 120 community groups protesting the decision to bar Huang from Australia. Many of the above groups were reportedly linked to the United Front Work Department.

Huang invited the then federal Labor Party leader Bill Shorten to his daughter's wedding to Evan Luo at the Shangri-la Sydney as a guest of honour.

In February 2019, the Australian authorities barred his bid for citizenship and revoked his permanent residency, and he was "effectively barred from re-entering Australia." His family are Australian citizens. Huang asked the political parties to return his donations; and also called Australia a "giant baby".

Huang is being pursued in A$141 million in taxes owed to the Australian Taxation Office after allegedly understating his income from 2013 to 2015.

In 2019, the NSW Independent Commission Against Corruption commenced investigations that Huang donated A$100,000 in cash to NSW Labor in 2015, in contravention of political donation legislation, triggering the resignation of Labor General Secretary Kaila Murnain and implicating former Labor politician Ernest Wong. Huang denied that he was the donor. Former Labor Senator Sam Dastyari was implicated in a Chinese-related donations scandal involving Huang, which eventually led to Dastyari's resignation from the Senate in January 2018.

Huang was also implicated in media investigations that he provided advice to Crown Resorts on how the company should deal with Chinese officials regarding the arrest of Crown staff in China for breaking Chinese law by promoting gambling.

== Personal life ==
Mr Huang moved to Australia in 2011.

In 2018, Huang was living in a $12.8 million "mansion" in Beauty Point, Mosman, Sydney.

In 2016, Huang's daughter Carina married Evan (Xiaozhi) Luo at the Shangri-La Hotel in Sydney.

His son Jimmy Huang earned a bachelor's degree in economics. In January 2018, aged 23, AWH Investment Group, owned 50/50 by Jimmy Huang and his brother-in-law Evan (Xiaozhi) Luo, was discovered to be the "mystery buyer" of two apartment projects at Circular Quay and the Gold Coast, sold by Wanda Group, China's largest property developer, for $1.119 billion. Jimmy Huang and Evan (Xiaozhi) Luo both have Australian citizenship.
