= 2021 New South Wales Labor Party leadership election =

Australian state political party election

- 4 June 2021
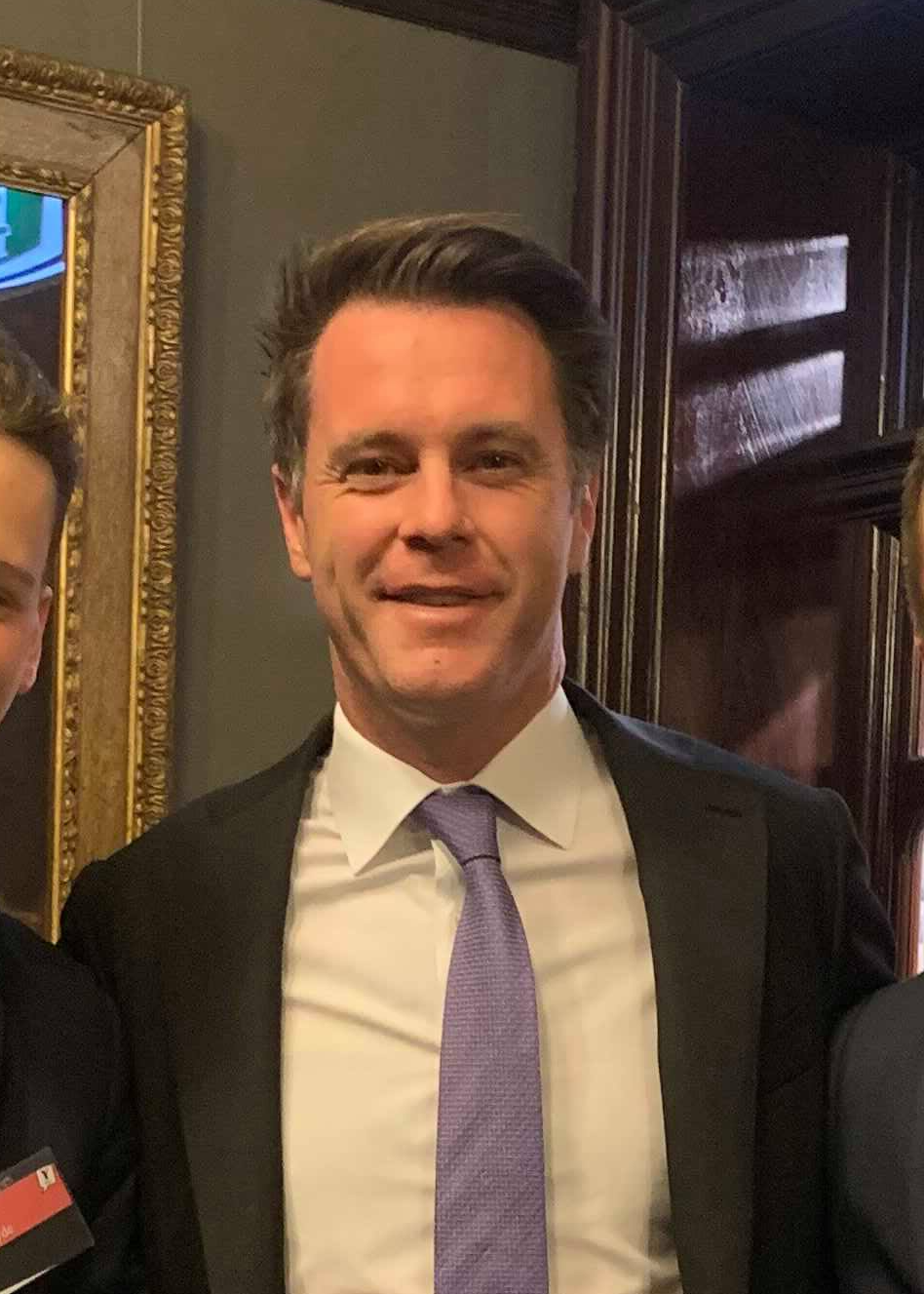
Candidate	Chris Minns
Result	Unopposed
Seat	Kogarah
Leader before election
Jodi McKay
Elected Leader
Chris Minns

An election for the leadership of the New South Wales Labor Party was held in June 2021, following the resignation of leader Jodi McKay on 28 May 2021.

Nominations for the leadership opened at 11:00 AEST on 4 June 2021. Each candidate would have had 48 hours to produce at least 15 signatures from caucus members for nomination. With Chris Minns as the only candidate nominated for the leadership, he was elected unopposed as the new party leader. Prue Car was elected unopposed as deputy party leader four days later.

== Background ==
Following Labor's loss in the 2021 Upper Hunter by-election, then-leader Jodi McKay resigned under pressure from the party caucus. Initially, the leadership election saw former opposition leader Michael Daley, who led Labor to a defeat in the 2019 New South Wales state election, declare his candidacy for a second time on 30 May 2021. Chris Minns would subsequently announce his candidacy for a third time the next day, having lost to Daley and McKay in previous ballots. On 4 June 2021, on the date nominations opened, Daley announced his withdrawal from the election, citing a lack of support and "for the good of the party". The leadership election represented the fifth time that Labor changed its leadership since the defeat in the 2011 election with only two leaders having led the party to an election as of 2021.

== Candidates ==
Under party rules, if there were more than one candidate, the election would be a combined vote by the party membership and the Labor members of the Parliament of New South Wales, with each component weighted equally. As only one candidate (Chris Minns) was nominated for leadership, Minns was elected unopposed.

=== Declared ===
- Chris Minns, Shadow Minister for Transport
List of Chris Minns endorsements

Members of the New South Wales Parliament

- Prue Car, Shadow Minister for Education (2019–present); MP for Londonderry (2015–present)
- Tim Crakanthorp, MP for Newcastle (2014–present)
- Jihad Dib, Shadow Minister for Skills and TAFE, Shadow Minister for Youth, Shadow Minister for Juvenile Justice and Shadow Minister Assisting on Multiculturalism (2019–present); MP for Lakemba (2015–present)
- John Graham, Shadow Minister for Roads and Shadow Minister for Music and the Night Time Economy (2019–present); State Labor Member of the New South Wales Legislative Council (2016–present)
- Jo Haylen, Shadow Minister for Active Transport, Shadow Minister for Senior and Volunteers and Shadow Minister for the Cost of Living (2019–present); MP for Summer Hill (2015–present)
- Courtney Houssos, State Labor Member of the New South Wales Legislative Council (2015–present)
- Rose Jackson, State Labor Member of the New South Wales Legislative Council (2019–present)
- Hugh McDermott, MP for Prospect (2015–present)
- Tania Mihailuk, MP for Bankstown (2011–present)
- Daniel Mookhey, Shadow Minister for Finance and Small Business and Shadow Minister for the Gig Economy (2019–present); State Labor Member of the New South Wales Legislative Council (2015–present)
- Tara Moriarty, Shadow Minister for Crown Lands and Shadow Minister for Mental Health (2019–present); State Labor Member of the New South Wales Legislative Council (2019–present)
- Ryan Park, Manager of Opposition Business, Shadow Minister for Health, Shadow Minister for housing and Homelessness and Shadow Minister for the Illawarra and South Coast (2019–present); MP for Keira (2011–present)
- Paul Scully, Shadow Minister for Natural Resources (2019–present); MP for Wollongong (2016–present)
- Walt Secord, Shadow Treasurer, Shadow Minister for the Arts and Shadow Special Minister of State (2019–2021); State Labor Member of the New South Wales Legislative Council (2011–present)
- Penny Sharpe, Deputy Leader of the Opposition in the Legislative Council, Shadow Minister for Family and Community Services and Shadow Minister for Disability Inclusion (2019–2021); State Labor Member of the New South Wales Legislative Council (2005–2015, 2015–present)
- Greg Warren, Shadow Minister for Local Government, Shadow Minister for Veterans and Shadow Minister for Western Sydney (2019–present); MP for Campbelltown (2015–present)
- Guy Zangari, MP for Fairfield (2011–present)

State officials and members of parliament

- Tom Koutsantonis, Treasurer of South Australia (2014–2018)

Local government officials

- Tony Bowen, City of Randwick Councillor
- Steve Christou, Mayor of Cumberland City Council (2019–present) (Independent)

Other figures

- Evan Hughes, Labor candidate for Wentworth at the 2016 Australian federal election

Media organisations and newspapers

- The Australian

=== Withdrew ===
- Michael Daley, Leader of the Opposition (2018–2019)

=== Declined ===
- Ryan Park, Shadow Minister for Health
- Paul Scully, MP for Wollongong

== Controversies ==
=== Daley ===
On 31 May 2021, a number of Asian Australian members and elected officials of NSW Labor released a joint statement criticising Michael Daley's candidacy citing comments made in 2018 about how residents in New South Wales were "being replaced by young people from typically Asia with PhDs." While Daley apologised about the comments prior to the 2019 state election, many have attributed the swing against the ALP in electorates in the Georges River local government area in the 2019 election owing to Daley's comments. The Georges River local government area sees over 22.8% of residents having Chinese ancestry according to the 2016 census and includes the electorates of Kogarah and Oatley. Both electorates saw a heavy swing against the ALP in 2019 with Oatley seeing a swing towards the Liberal Party of Australia from 6.6% in 2015 to 10.3% in 2019 while Kogarah, held by prospective leadership candidate Chris Minns went from 6.9% to less than 2% in the same election. On 1 June 2021, Daley apologised again on ABC Radio for his "offensive" comments.

=== Minns ===
A report by The Daily Telegraph on 31 May reported that the head office of NSW Labor was "encouraging" members of the caucus to support Minns' candidacy for the leadership to avoid a contested ballot. In addition, another report by The Daily Telegraph also stated that Shadow Minister for Health Ryan Park decided not to contest the leadership to ensure a quick succession of leadership. The 2019 leadership election which saw outgoing leader Jodi McKay defeating Minns went for 22 days to finalise a result.

== See also ==
- 2019 New South Wales state election
- 2023 New South Wales state election
- 2019 New South Wales Labor Party leadership election
