= Australian Services Union =

Australian trade union

ASU
- Australian Municipal, Administrative, Clerical and Services Union
- Founded: 1 July 1993
- Headquarters: Melbourne, Victoria
- Location: Australia
- Members: ▲135,627 (as at 31 December 2024)
- Key people: Emeline Gaske National Secretary
- Affiliations: ACTU, ALP, ITF
- Website: www.asu.asn.au

The Australian Services Union (formally registered as the Australian Municipal, Administrative, Clerical and Services Union) is a trade union representing workers in a variety of industries.

The ASU is affiliated with the Australian Council of Trade Unions, the Australian Labor Party and the International Transport Workers' Federation. Within the Australian Labor Party, the ASU is aligned with Labor Left.

== History ==
The current incarnation of the ASU was formed in 1993 as a result of a three way amalgamation between the Federated Municipal and Shire Council Employees Union (MEU), the Federated Clerks' Union (FCU) and the Australian Municipal, Transport, Energy, Water, Ports, Community & Information Services Union, which was also known as the ASU at the time.

This former incarnation of the ASU was the product of several earlier amalgamations including:

- 1 July 1991: The Municipal Officers' Association (MOA), the Australian Transport Officers' Federation (ATOF) and the Technical Services Guild of Australia (TSG).
- July 1992: the Australian Social Welfare Union joined the ASU.
- October 1992: West Australian Railway Officers Association joined the ASU.
- November 1992: the Australian Shipping & Travel Officers Association (ASTOA) joined the ASU.

The amalgamation of these unions occurred as a result of an ACTU policy of encouraging union rationalisation.

== Union structure ==
While the ASU has a single national identity, the union continues to operate in a practical sense through a number of separate state branches. Several of these branches also operate in conjunction with unions that are registered under the industrial relations systems of various states. In Queensland, for example, the two ASU branches are Together and The Services Union. The same applies in NSW with the United Services Union (USU) representing Local Government, Clerical and Administrative, Energy, airlines and utilities division, and the NSW Services branch, or simply known as the ASU.

Elected Representatives
Name	Position	Convening responsibilities
Emeline Gaske	National Secretary	Convenor of the Utilities (Energy & Water) Division, the Local Government Division and the Transport Committee (Rail and Bus).
	Assistant National Secretary	Convenor of the National Airlines Division

== Industries ==
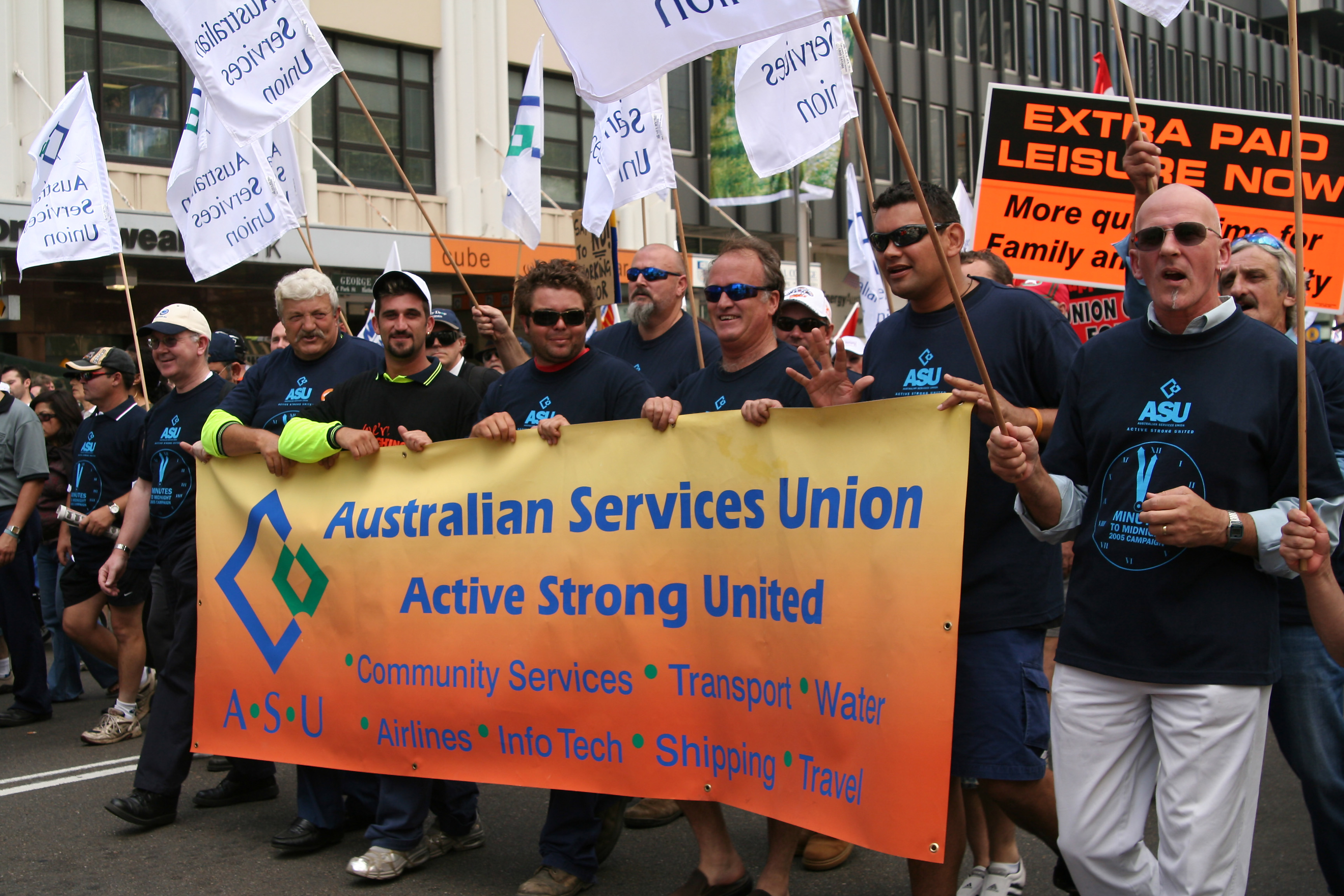
ASU workers protest Prime Minister John Howard's industrial relations reforms

Union activities are structured into "industries": local government, energy and utilities, airlines and transport, social and community services, information technology, and clerical and administration employees.

=== Local government ===
The ASU is the principal union in the local government industry nationally. Under the ASU's federal rules, all local government employees are eligible to join the union. In a practical sense, there are differences in the local government occupations that are covered by each state branch. These differences arise out of the differing history of the predecessors of the ASU and whether there were other local government unions in existence at the time of ASU amalgamations. In NSW, Victoria, Western Australia and Tasmania the ASU or its affiliated state registered unions are the dominant local government unions and represent members in both blue collar or wages areas and white collar or salaried staff. In these states there are other small craft unions. In South Australia and Queensland the ASU only covers salaried staff, whereas blue collar employees are covered by state registered unions that are not affiliated with the ASU - principally the Australian Workers' Union (AWU).

=== Energy and utilities ===
The ASU is a principal union in this industry nationally. This coverage originally stems from the MEU's and MOA's coverage of employees in the local government industry. At this time responsibility for the utilities - Electricity generation and distribution, Water supply and Sewerage and Sanitation were principally all local government responsibilities. When these responsibilities were assumed by state government instrumentalities, both the MOA and MEU retained coverage of employees.

=== Airlines and transport ===
The ASU is a significant union in the transport industry, including in airlines, shipping, railways, road transport and in ports. In this industry the ASU covers salaried employees. This coverage is a result of the combined coverage from ATOF, ASTOA, the FCU and various state salaried Railway Officers Unions. The ASU's coverage in ports stems from the MOA.

=== Social and community services ===
The SACS industry has been a significant growth area for the ASU since its amalgamation. The union covers a diverse range of employees in the non-profit community sector, including charities. Coverage of this area stems from the ASWU.

=== Information technology ===
In this area the ASU represents employees who work as technicians as well as those engaged in IT areas that are related to office administration. The coverage is derived from the TSG and the FCU.

=== Clerical and administrative ===
The ASU has very broad coverage of office workers. In most states this is concentrated around the private sector, except in Queensland where the union has traditionally also covered clerks in hospitals, university and other public sector areas.
