= Hard left =

Political descriptor

Hard left (or hard-left) is a term that is used particularly in Australian and British English to describe the most radical members of a left-wing political party or political group. As a noun and modifier it is sometimes used pejoratively in referring to left-wing political movements and ideas seen as outside the mainstream centre-left. The term has been used to describe wings and factions of several political parties across the world, particularly the Labour Left wing of the Labour Party in the United Kingdom and Labor Left faction of the Australian Labor Party, particularly in the 1980s. In Australia, the term refers especially to the group around Anthony Albanese. In the UK, it refers especially to the Socialist Campaign Group and Bennites.

== Australia ==
As with the Labor Right faction, the Labor Left faction of the Australian Labor Party is split between multiple competing sub-factions. These sub-factions vary in their level of support across state branches, as well as in their union support and affiliations. In New South Wales, the left is split mainly between the "hard" left and "soft" left. The hard left has historically focused on the trade union movement and international issues, and organised around figures like Frank Walker, Arthur Gietzelt, and Australian Prime Minister Anthony Albanese. The soft left has presented a "more pragmatic" vision of the left and relied primarily on the rank-and-file party membership as a power base, and organised around politicians Peter Baldwin and Jack Ferguson.

During the 1980s, prolonged disputes over tactical issues and personality conflicts resulted in a split occurring within the New South Wales Labor Left, creating two sub-factional groupings; the 'Hard Left' and the 'Soft Left', the latter of which was the successor of the Baldwinites. A significant event which caused the split was the election of the Secretary Assistant of the New South Wales Labor Party, where the Hard Left faction supported Anthony Albanese while the Soft Left faction supported Jan Burnswoods. The Hard Left faction was more closely aligned with left-wing groups external to the Labor Party, maintaining "closer links with broader left-wing groups, such as the Communist Party of Australia, People for Nuclear Disarmament and the African National Congress" as well as trade union officials, political staffers, lobbyists and student politicians, while the Soft Left's main base of support was among rank-and-file party branch members. In terms of tactics, the Hard Left favoured a top-down approach of transactional negotiation with the Labor Right, whilst the Soft Left advocated a continuation of the Baldwinite bottom-up strategy of mobilising the grassroots membership to win party positions. This difference in approach led to struggles between the two factions over candidate selections, with the Hard Left using their control over the party apparatus in tandem with sections of the Right to deselect Soft Left MPs across the state, particularly in western Sydney, Newcastle and Wollongong. For example, in Newcastle Bryce Gaudry was deselected in favour of the Right's Jodi McKay, following which about 130 members resigned or were expelled from the city's ALP branches, previously the largest in the state. The factions also had differing views on policy. While members of both the Soft and Hard Left opposed the Hawke/Keating government's privatisation of the Commonwealth Bank and Qantas, the Hard Left was seen as being more staunchly resistant to these changes.

In Victoria, the term "hard left" historically referred to the far-left "Tomato Left" and Pledge faction, which included Bill Hartley, George Crawford, and Joan Coxsedge; the latter two members of the Pledge group who split from the broader Socialist Left faction in 1991 and included union leaders such as Ian Jones (Victorian secretary of the Builders Labourers Federation/VBEF), Len Cooper (Victorian secretary of the ATEA), and Gary Main (Victorian secretary of the Electrical Trades Union/ETU).

== Britain ==
The term was first used in the context of debates within both the Labour Party and the broader left in the 1980s to describe Trotskyist groups such as the Militant tendency, Socialist Organiser and Socialist Action. Within the party, the Labour left or "hard left", represented by the Socialist Campaign Group, subscribed to more strongly socialist views while the "soft left", associated for example with the Tribune Group, embraced more moderate social democratic ideas. Neil Kinnock's first term as party leader was dominated by his clash with the hard left.

Politicians commonly described as being on the hard left of the Labour Party at the time included Tony Benn, Derek Hatton, Ken Livingstone, Dennis Skinner, and Eric Heffer.

The term has since then often been used pejoratively by Labour's political opponents, for example, during the Conservative Party's election campaigns of the early 1990s, and by the media. It has continued to be used pejoratively for the left wing of the Labour Party. The term was widely used to describe Jeremy Corbyn and his supporters in Momentum.

== See also ==
- Soft left
- Centre-left politics
- Far-left
- Militant Tendency
