= Together (union) =

Australian union

Together Queensland
- Together Queensland, Industrial Union of Employees
- Founded: 2011
- Headquarters: 22 Cordelia Street, South Brisbane, Queensland
- Location: Australia
- Members: 39 000
- Key people: Alex Scott, Secretary; Sharon Abbott, President; Dee Spink, Assistant Secretary; Michael Thomas, Assistant Secretary
- Affiliations: ACTU, QCU
- Website: www.together.org.au

Together is a trade union covering workers in the public and private sectors in the state of Queensland, Australia. The largest areas of coverage is the state public sector, including clinical and administrative staff in Queensland Health, state schools and TAFE institutes, the Department of Communities and other departments. Other areas of coverage include universities (general staff), airline employees, private clinical pathology services, private and not-for-profit healthcare providers, and clerical and administrative staff across a range of industries.

Together is a branch of the Australian Services Union, and members of Together are also members of the ASU at a federal level.

== History ==
Together was created in July 2011 as an amalgamation of the Queensland Public Sector Union and the Australian Services Union (Central and Southern Queensland) Branch. The union is registered within the state industrial relations jurisdiction as Together and in the federal system as ASU/AMACSU.

== Union structure ==
Union Conference is Together's peak decision making body. Every four years the Electoral Commission of Queensland holds elections for Conference delegates. Each delegate represents members in their agency to ensure all members have their say in their union. Union Conference meets four times a year.

== Past campaigns ==
The QPSU has been involved in the Your Rights at Work campaign. The QPSU has also had campaigns specifically targeting Queensland government departments, including Queensland Department of Health, Queensland Department of Child Safety and Queensland Department of Disability Services.

A badge from one of the union's campaigns concerning the industrial problems in Queensland Health.
