= Blockade Australia =

Group protesting climate change in Australia

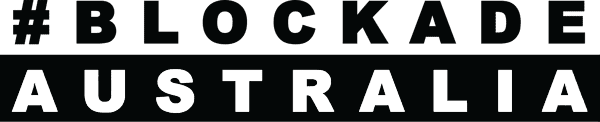
- Type: Advocacy group, Direct action
- Purpose: Climate change mitigation Nature conservation Environmental protection Decolonization
- Region served: Australia
- Fields: Conservation movement Environmental movement
- Website: www.blockadeaustralia.com

Blockade Australia is a direct action group in Australia who blockade rail and roads in ports to "force the urgent broad-scale change necessary for survival". They describe themselves as "committed to taking the action necessary to disrupt economic bottlenecks of Australia and stop the exploitative colonial project". Direct action is also used to inform the public 'that the climate crisis is a threat to life on earth, that the systems that are in power on this continent and around the world are causing the crisis and have no capacity, let alone will, to change.

== Actions ==
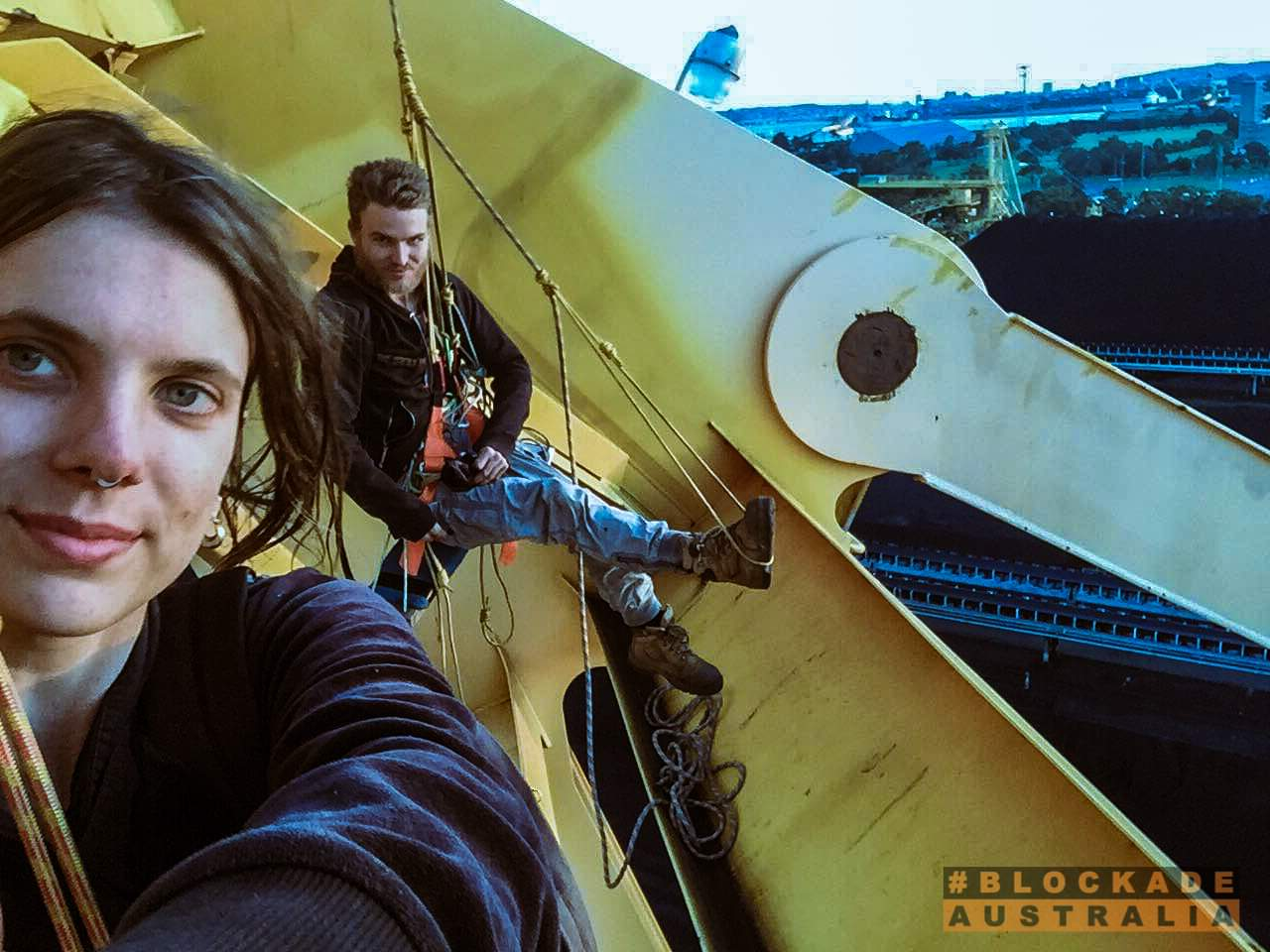
Two individuals participating in Blockade Australia shut down world's largest coal port in Newcastle

=== Port of Newcastle ===
In November 2021, Blockade Australia members carried out two weeks of nonviolent direct action using their bodies, rope and glue to shut down activity at Port of Newcastle, Hunter Region, the largest coal port in the world. As a result of the actions 27 were arrested, including new climate activists and some known from their participation in Front Line Action on Coal (FLAC) and Extinction Rebellion. Eric Sergeio Herbert was sentenced to 12 months in prison for climbing on top of a coal train. Under section 42C of the Confiscation of Proceeds of Crime Act 1989 (NSW), NSW police placed a freezing order upon 26-year-old Sasha's 2018 Hyundai Kona station wagon – which she had been living in – for her suspected part in the actions. NSW police raided Newcastle's Hunter Community Environment Centre, despite the fact that it and its members had no connection to Blockade Australia and the shutting down of Newcastle Coal Port.

In July 2024, the group organised protests on the Hunter rail line impacting coal trains and more than 200 passenger trains.

=== Port Botany ===
On 22 March 2022 a man was associated to Blockade Australia by Australian Broadcasting Corporation having allegedly suspended himself from a pole in Port Botany. Later in the week two students of German nationality were announced to have visas revoked and to be deported for these actions. Climate activist Maxim O'Donnell Curmi was jailed for four months for running into Port Botany and climbing on top of a crane.

=== Sydney ===
Blockade Australia planned a series of actions and blockades of Sydney June and July 2022.

Leading up to the planned week of action, the Blockade Australia campsite located at a property in Colo, New South Wales was being monitored by police. A group member spotted two camouflaged police officers, unbeknown to the group members, and asked questions as to who they were. After lying still for a time, "as if they're playing dead", one of the camouflaged officers was reported to have said "we've been compromised" into a covert radio before running into an unmarked car that was prevented from leaving the campsite. A search warrant was then obtained and a raid on the campsite was then initiated. At least 10 people were charged in connection with the raid.

A few days later, at a Blockade Australia campsite in Ebenezer, in another raid, a further two people were arrested in connection with the earlier Colo raid. One of those arrested was Koori Ngemba Elder Caroline Kirk.

From the 28 July 2022 protest, 10 were arrested. The majority of those arrested were from other states.

38 Blockade Australia activists were placed on non-association orders.

== Responses ==
Former Deputy Prime Minister Barnaby Joyce stated about the Port of Newcastle shutdown "If they've got other ways that this nation can earn money right now, then we're all ears... but in the meantime, we've got to make a buck."

The New South Wales treasurer and energy minister Matt Kean has asked police to "throw the book" at Blockade Australia activists.

Parliamentary Secretary for the Hunter, Taylor Martin stated "I support the Police in seeking the maximum possible sentence for anybody involved in these idiotic acts". Martin also estimated "activists have delayed $60 million in exports and $100,000 in royalties per train."

Members of the New South Wales Parliament cited the activities of Blockade Australia as a key motivation for increased criminal penalties for protestors under the Roads and Crimes Legislation Amendment Bill 2022.

== In popular culture ==
Eric Serge Herbert was featured in the comic strip First Dog on the Moon.

== See also ==
- Greenhouse gas emissions by Australia
- Ende Gelände
