= New South Wales Labor Party =

Affiliate of the Australian Labor Party

New South Wales Labor Party Australian Labor Party (New South Wales Branch)
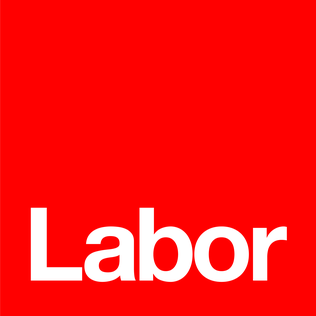
- Leader: Chris Minns
- Deputy leader: Prue Car
- General secretary: Dominic Ofner
- President: Dr Tricia Kavanagh
- Founded: 1891; 135 years ago
- Headquarters: 377 Sussex Street, Sydney, New South Wales, Australia
- Youth wing: Young Labor
- Women's wing: Labor Women's Network
- LGBT wing: Rainbow Labor
- Membership (2020): 15,427 (▲1,927) (Note: In 2015 the party had a membership of 18,321. In June and July 2019, the party's membership figures were reportedly 10,800 –c. 13,500. By 2020, the party's membership numbers had increased from 2019 and was numbered at 15,427.)
- Ideology: Social democracy
- Political position: Centre-left
- National affiliation: Australian Labor
- Union affiliate: Unions NSW
- Colours: Red
- Legislative Assembly: 46 / 93
- Legislative Council: 15 / 42
- House of Representatives: 28 / 46 (NSW seats)
- Senate: 4 / 12 (NSW seats)
- Local government: 164 / 1,480

Website
- nswlabor.org.au

The New South Wales Labor Party, officially known as the Australian Labor Party (New South Wales Branch) and commonly referred to simply as NSW Labor, is the New South Wales branch of the Australian Labor Party (ALP). The branch is the current ruling party in the state of New South Wales and is led by Chris Minns, who has served concurrently as premier of New South Wales since 2023.

The parliamentary leader is elected from and by the members of the party caucus, comprising all party members in the Legislative Assembly and Legislative Council. The party factions have a strong influence on the election of the leader. The leader's position is dependent on the continuing support of the caucus (and party factions) and the leader may be deposed by failing to win a vote of confidence of parliamentary members. By convention, the premier sits in the Legislative Assembly, and is the leader of the party controlling a majority in that house. The party leader also typically is a member of the Assembly, though this is not a strict party constitutional requirement. Barrie Unsworth, for example, was elected party leader while a member of the Legislative Council. He then transferred to the Assembly by winning a seat at a by-election.

When the Labor party wins sufficient seats to be able to control a majority in the Legislative Assembly, the party leader becomes the state Premier and Labor will form the government. When Labor is the largest party not in government, the party leader becomes the Leader of the Opposition. To become a premier or opposition leader, the party leader must be or within a short period of time become a member of the Legislative Assembly.

== History ==
=== Early history ===
The NSW branch of the Australian Labor Party, known as the Labor Electoral League of New South Wales from 1891 to 1917, first won 35 of the 141 seats in the NSW parliament at the 1891 election. The initial caucus voted against appointing a leader and the party was directed by a steering committee of five members until, (Note: The members of the steering committee were George Black, Joseph Cook, Jack FitzGerald, Thomas Houghton and William Sharp.) following a request from the party's extra-parliamentary executive, Joseph Cook was elected as the first leader in 1893. Cook left the party in the following year when he was obliged to sign a pledge that he would support all caucus decisions in parliament. James McGowen, who signed the pledge, succeeded Cook as party leader in 1894. At the 1894 state election Labor representation was reduced to 18. After the 1898 election, Labor held the balance of power with George Reid's Free Trade government being dependent on Labor to push through New South Wales' adoption of Federation. McGowen's support for Federation was critical to Labor maintaining its support for the adoption of measures to implement Federation, even though the party remained opposed to the adopted Constitution, which it saw as biased in favour of business interests. The 1904 state election saw Labor become the second largest party and the official opposition for the first time.

=== First government in New South Wales and internal divisions ===
At the 1910 election, the Labor Party first won government in NSW with a slim majority of 46 of 90 seats; as a result, McGowen was premier from 1910 to 1913. But increasing success was accompanied by increasing tensions within the labour movement: from the 1890s the Australian Workers' Union attempted to assert its influence on the NSW parliamentary party, with little success for many years. Divisions also opened up between state and federal Labor after Andrew Fisher took office as Prime Minister of the first federal Labor government in 1908: William Holman, the NSW party's main parliamentary strategist at the time, presented a policy agenda at state party conferences which differed from that approved by the federal party, in particular in its opposition to the transfer of responsibilities for finance and industrial relations from the state to the Commonwealth government, a dispute in which the AWU sided with the ALP. Tensions continued to rise during McGowen's premiership, as McGowen and Holman refused to support the holding of the 1911 trade and commerce referendum favoured by the ALP: in addition Holman alienated extra-parliamentary Labor members and some of the NSW caucus by appointing a number of new members to the state's Legislative Council, including some who were not Labor members. This ran counter to the state party's platform, which advocated for the abolition of the Council, something which was not attempted by the state Labor governments of the 1910s, and which was a divisive issue in the party at the time.

McGowen was deposed by his deputy Holman after McGowen attempted to break a gas workers' strike by threatening to replace strikers with non-union labour. Upon the outbreak of World War I, Holman announced a truce with the state Commonwealth Liberal Party which would take industrial reform off the agenda for the remainder of the war. In addition, the prospect of putting the economy on a war footing increased fears regarding job losses. These developments increased disillusion with Labor among unions and encouraged thinking about new political strategies. In November 1915 Labor affiliated unions in NSW, led by the AWU, formed the Industrial Section, the first formally organised Labor faction in Australia, with the aim of asserting control over the NSW parliamentary party. At the state party conference in April 1916, the Industrial Section, swept the party's internal elections, taking 31 out of 36 offices including the party's presidency. The Industrial Section became a model for later factional organisations in the ALP, both in New South Wales and nationwide.

=== Conscription split ===
The conscription issue divided the Labor Party and wider Australian community in 1916. While much of the Australian labour movement and general community was opposed to conscription, Australian Labor Prime Minister Billy Hughes and Premier Holman strongly supported conscription, and both crossed the floor to vote with the conservative parties, and both were expelled from the Labor Party. When Hughes met with the executive of NSW Labor in September 1916 to attempt to persuade them to back his conscription plan, he lost the vote 21–5 and was warned that he would be expelled if he continued to press the matter. Ernest Durack became state party leader, while Holman formed a coalition on 15 November 1916 with the leader of the opposition Liberal Reform Party, Charles Wade, with himself as Premier. Following the exodus of pro-conscription MPs from the party, many leaders of the Industrial Section took advantage of the new vacancies to secure selection for open seats. Early in 1917, Holman and his supporters merged with Liberal Reform to form the state branch of the Nationalist Party of Australia. While the merged party was dominated by former Liberals, Holman became its leader. At the 1917 state election, the Nationalists won a huge victory, presaging the equally massive federal Nationalist victory later that year.

During his leadership of the Nationalist government, Holman vigorously defended the government-owned enterprises from the more conservative wing of his party. Durack's leadership lasted only for about three months, and he was succeeded by John Storey in February 1917. In April 1918 the Industrial Section changed its name to the Industrial Vigilance Council, a change in part prompted by a leftward shift in the union movement influenced by the Great War and the Russian Revolution. At this point it was increasingly beset by internal divisions, in particular between the relatively conservative AWU and smaller unions and radicals such as the syndicalist-influenced Sam Rosa. This came to a head during 1919 due to divisions over whether conscription should end following the closing of the First World War and whether the Australian union movement should adopt the syndicalist principle of the One Big Union. The faction was wound up in August 1919, with many of its radicals such as Albert Willis going on to form the Industrial Socialist Labor Party. This left the state party firmly in the control of the AWU At the 1920 election, Holman and his Nationalists were thrown from office in a massive swing to Labor. Storey became premier with a majority of one.

=== Dooley–Storey era ===
On Storey's death in October 1921, James Dooley became leader of the party and premier. His government was defeated on the floor of the House on 13 December 1921, but new Premier George Fuller lost a vote within seven hours of his appointment, and Dooley regained power. He lost the 1922 election to Fuller in a highly sectarian election campaign. As the result of a dispute with a party executive, dominated by the Australian Workers' Union, Dooley was expelled from the party in February 1923 and replaced by Greg McGirr as leader, but the Federal Executive intervened and appointed Bill Dunn as an interim leader until Jack Lang was elected by the caucus, with the support of more radical unions, most prominently Albert Willis and his Australian Coal and Shale Employees' Federation.

=== Lang era ===
Lang led the ALP to victory in the 1925 election and became Premier. His support in the caucus was challenged in 1926 and in that year the party's annual State Conference, which strongly supported Lang, assumed the right to select the leader instead of caucus. The following year Lang and his extra-parliamentary allies drastically altered the party rules so that State Conference delegates and members of the Central Executive were elected in a complicated group system. The ALP was defeated at the 1927 election but won in a landslide at the 1930 election.

Lang opposed the Premiers' Plan to combat the Great Depression agreed to by the federal Labor government of James Scullin and the other state Premiers, who called for even more stringent cuts to government spending to balance the budget. In March 1931, the NSW branch of the party was expelled by the Federal Executive in the Federal Conference.

In October 1931, Lang's followers in the federal House of Representatives crossed the floor to vote with the conservative United Australia Party and bring down the Scullin government.

This action split the NSW Labor Party in two – Lang's followers and the expelled NSW branch became known as Lang Labor, while Scullin's supporters, led by Chifley, became known in NSW as Federal Labor. Most of the party's branches and affiliated trade unions supported Lang. Furthermore, Lang's persistence with his plan led to the Lang Dismissal Crisis in 1931–32 which led to his dismissal as premier by the State Governor on 13 May 1932. The Governor appointed the UAP leader, Bertram Stevens, as premier and Stevens immediately called the 1932 election, at which Labor was heavily defeated. In February 1936, the NSW branch rejoined the Australian Labor Party and became the official NSW branch of the ALP again. Federal Labor was then abolished.

Lang's lack of success at state elections eroded his support within the labour movement. He had not won a state election since 1930. This led some members of caucus, including Bob Heffron, to break away to form the Industrial Labor Party. In 1939, following intervention by the Federal Executive, the two factions were reunited at a state conference. This gathering also reversed the "red rules" and returned the power of selecting the party leader to the caucus. Lang was deposed in 1939.

=== McKell and post-war era ===
William McKell became party leader, reuniting and rejuvenating the party. Under his leadership the extreme left wing of the party had been expelled and had contested the 1941 election as the far left wing State Labor Party. McKell led Labor to a convincing victory and became Premier. State Labor's poor showing had resulted in its dissolution shortly after the election. During World War II McKell became a close collaborator of Labor Prime Ministers John Curtin and Ben Chifley, being a particularly close friend of the latter. Labor unity was again threatened by Jack Lang who had been expelled from the Labor Party in 1943 and formed another version of the Lang Labor Party. On this occasion he received no support from the rest of the caucus and spent the rest of the term as the sole member. At the 1944 election McKell won another victory, the first time a New South Wales Labor government had been re-elected. On early 1947 he resigned and announced acceptance of appointment as Governor General. James McGirr was elected leader and premier and led Labor to another victory at the 1947 election. McGirr nearly lost the 1950 election and was replaced in 1952 by Joseph Cahill.

In August 1953, two Fairfield aldermen − including a former mayor − split from ALP to form the Official Labour Movement. Although it won two seats at the local government elections in December 1953, it failed to defeat the ALP at state or federal elections and faded away soon after.

=== Labor in government, 1952–1965 ===
Cahill decisively won the 1953 election. He was desperate to keep the New South Wales branch of the ALP united despite the sectarian and ideological split that resulted in the formation of the right-wing Democratic Labor Party in 1954. He achieved this by controlling the anti-DLP faction in his party. The DLP did not contest the 1956 election, which Labor won. Cahill was returned in the 1959 election, but died in office later that year. He was succeeded as leader and premier by Bob Heffron. Heffron continued the Labor reign in New South Wales winning the 1962 election. Heffron resigned the leadership and premiership in 1964, and was succeeded by Jack Renshaw, who lost the premiership at the 1965 election ending 24 years of Labor power in the state.

=== Opposition, 1965–1976 ===
Renshaw also lost the 1968 election, after which he resigned the leadership, to be succeeded by Pat Hills. Hills lost the 1971 and 1973 election after which he was deposed by Neville Wran.

=== Wran–Unsworth era, 1976–1988 ===
Wran narrowly won the 1976 election and remained premier until 1986, winning two Landslide victory's popularly known as the "Wranslide." In 1978 election and 1981 election. He was succeeded by Barrie Unsworth who took over the premiership until Labor's loss at the 1988 election, after which he resigned.

=== Carr era, 1988–2005 ===
Bob Carr became leader in 1988 and led Labor to victory in the 1995 election. Carr was premier for 10 years, before resigning in 2005. He was the longest continuous-serving premier in New South Wales.

=== Iemma era, 2005–2008 ===
Carr was succeeded by Morris Iemma. At the time, the state transport network was inferior, and public transport was often criticised as the most stark example of Carr's inaction. Iemma and the Treasurer Michael Costa supported the idea to sidestep the high costs and industrial risks of the existing RailCorp network and instead begin building a new rapid transit rail system in parallel. The new system would incorporate smaller, lighter rolling stock, reducing construction costs, and be operated by the private sector, reducing operating costs. But despite the savings available via the rapid transit option, the costs were still beyond the state's means.

Iemma comfortably won the 2007 election with the loss of only four seats. His strategy was to draw a line under the failures of the Carr era and ask the electorate for another chance. The Opposition ran a poor campaign, and the electorate was minded to trust the affable, hard-working new premier. Iemma was returned but with far less political capital than the size of Labor's majority would suggest.

==== Proposed electricity privatisation ====
This is why I am the Premier.

— Morris Iemma, late 2007

Journalist Simon Benson describes a crucial meeting in late 2007 between Iemma and Labor state president Bernie Riordan during the height of the furore over electricity privatisation:

[Iemma] had laid out on his desk a spreadsheet of infrastructure projects … On the bottom half were all the projects the state needed if it was to avoid choking on its own congestion within the next decade. It amounted to more than $25 billion. And that was what they hadn't even announced.

"This is why I am the Premier," he told Riordan, emphasising his belief that it was critical for the privatisation to succeed. "These [projects] need to be done. I need to do these."

Immediately following the 2007 election, Iemma and Treasurer Costa secretly plotted their strategy for the next four years, under the heading of "bullets to bite". Both knew that if they were to build the new rapid transit system and address the growing crisis in electricity supply, they would need to bring the private sector into the state's electricity industry first.

The federal party's immediate political needs intervened, with the new federal Labor leader Kevin Rudd persuading Iemma to defer his privatisation announcement until after the 2007 federal election. Rudd felt he could ill afford the distraction of a debate over asset sales in the country's most populous state. With the funding source a secret, the rapid transit plan had to be kept under wraps as well.

Along with his plan to sell the government's electricity generation and retailing companies, Iemma announced a massive infrastructure scheme involving South West Rail Link, an inner city motorway network, and the Metro Link network, a system of underground, privately operated, single-deck, automated trains. The government planned to use up to $3 billion from the sale of retail electricity to help fund the inner city motorway network, linking the M4 Western Motorway to the CBD and the airport

The Electrical Trades Union (ETU) was ideologically opposed to the privatisation of the electricity businesses and led opposition to the plan. The ETU's secretary, Bernie Riordan, was also the president of NSW Labor. The secretary of the Unions NSW, John Robertson, was also a member of the ETU and opposed the privatisation. The party secretary, Karl Bitar, and his deputy, Luke Foley, were less ideologically committed on the issue, but their polling showed that the public was against a sale and – more importantly – tiring of Iemma and his team. They too came down against Iemma's plan.

What followed was an extraordinary, year-long struggle by the party's head office and affiliated trade unions to force cabinet and caucus to abandon an already-announced policy. Robertson, Bitar and Foley had the union-dominated party conference pass a motion reminding MPs of the party's notional commitment to democratic socialism. Next, union and party officials began threatening Labor MPs with disendorsement if they voted with the Premier on privatisation. Remembering the promise Rudd had made to him in 2007, Iemma called on the Prime Minister to have the federal party intervene to protect MPs who sided with the Government. Rudd declined. Former Prime Minister Paul Keating, former premiers Carr, Barrie Unsworth and Neville Wran, and former Labor Council secretaries Michael Easson and John McBean came out publicly in support of Iemma.

On 3 May 2008, the NSW Labor's State Conference rejected, by 702 to 107 votes, the Iemma government's plans to privatise the state's electricity system.

Two members of the party's Socialist Left faction, upper house MPs Lynda Voltz and Ian West, succumbed to the pressure and announced that they would vote against the party on privatisation. Had the vote gone ahead, it would have been the first instance of a Labor MP 'crossing the floor' in 14 years of government. The Liberal Opposition, led by moderate Barry O'Farrell, saw an opportunity to wound Iemma by denying him the opportunity to build the metro. Together, West, Voltz, the Greens and the Opposition had the numbers to defeat the Government in the upper house in August 2008.

On 3 September 2008, Deputy Premier and Transport Minister John Watkins announced he was going to retire for family reasons, triggering a cabinet reshuffle. On 4 September 2008, Costa was advised by Iemma that he would no longer be in the forthcoming reshuffle and hence dumped as Treasurer. Iemma had also proposed that other ministers would be dumped, including Health Minister Reba Meagher. Iemma's faction, Centre Unity, supported the sacking of the Treasurer but not the other four Ministers. The following day, right-wing Labor powerbrokers Eddie Obeid and Joe Tripodi told Iemma that he had lost the support of MPs and would not survive a caucus meeting. Nathan Rees also walked into the meeting with a number of Labor MPs announcing he had the numbers to overthrow Iemma. Seeing that he had lost the support of his caucus faction, Iemma resigned as leader and Premier. He was replaced by Rees as leader and Premier.

=== Rees and Keneally era, 2008–2011 ===
Rees was leader and premier for only 15 months before he was deposed by Kristina Keneally, who resigned after Labor was defeated in a landslide at the 2011 election.

=== Opposition, 2011–2023 ===
Keneally was succeeded by John Robertson. He resigned in December 2014, after the 2014 Sydney hostage crisis, after it was revealed that he had had contact with Man Haron Monis, who was one of Robertson's constituents. On 5 January 2015 Luke Foley was elected leader. In the 2015 state election, Labor achieved a 9.9-point two-party-preferred swing, but the Coalition comfortably retained government. Foley resigned in November 2018 in the face of sexual assault allegations, and was succeeded by Michael Daley in the resulting leadership contest. In the 2019 election, the party recorded a small TPP swing in its favour and won two seats, but remained in opposition. On 25 March 2019, Daley announced his intention to step down as leader. Penny Sharpe, who was elected deputy leader in November 2018, served as interim leader until the leadership ballot was held in June; Jodi McKay was elected leader. In May 2021, McKay resigned the leadership, and was replaced by Chris Minns on 4 June 2021.

=== Minns era, 2021–present ===
==== 2021–2023 ====
After going through five leaders since the 2011 state election, which included four leadership elections (2015, 2018, 2019, 2021), New South Wales Labor, led by Leader of the Opposition and right-faction MP for Kogarah Chris Minns, won back the state after 11 years and 362 days in opposition. Minns had been leader of the party since June 2021 after being elected unopposed following the resignation of former leader Jodi McKay. Minns announced his shadow ministry over the following week, with a "focus on working families, Western Sydney and the cost-of-living..." Months after becoming leader of the party Minns reiterated his party's plan to invest in Western Sydney after stating at the Labor Party state conference that his party would scrap the Beaches Link and redirect the funds ($10 billion) to public transport infrastructure to Greater Western Sydney. (Note: The Beaches Link proposal was officially cancelled in September 2023 by the Minns government.) He also criticised the privatisation of WestConnex, stating: "Look at the circumstances surrounding the privatisation of WestConnex... just one road as part of the WestConnex network will make $28 billion from the pockets of the families of western Sydney".

By the time of the 2023 state election, the party had a myriad of key election promises, including: scrapping the public-sector wages cap; "Improve conditions for tenants by establishing a Rental Commissioner to advocate for renters, allowing renters to directly transfer bonds from one property to another, outlawing secret rental bidding, and listing reasonable grounds for owners to end a lease (to stop unfair evictions);" "ensure the trains are built in New South Wales, creating at least 1,000 jobs;" "establish TAFE manufacturing centres so every year, an extra 1,000 apprentices can be trained in skills like mechanical engineering and electrical fitting for free;" "Tradies and truck drivers using the M5 East and M8 would also have their tolls cut. Those who take two trips a day, five days a week will save a total of $3,800 a year;" and ban financial donations from clubs as well as trialing a mandatory cashless gaming card, among many others.

==== 2023–present ====
In March 2023, the New South Wales Labor Party won the election, however only won a minority government. At the time Minns was appointed leader of the party, the Premier of New South Wales was Liberal Party leader Gladys Berejiklian. However, four months later Berejiklian was replaced by Dominic Perrottet. Initially opinion polls remained fairly steady, with the Liberal–National Coalition government losing one to two points. By September 2022 (1 year, 106 days after Minns became party leader) the party took the lead in the primary vote polls for the first time in over a decade, and maintained the two-party-preferred opinion poll consistently until the state election. ABC News stated, following the election, that "Labor's pledge to scrap the Coalition's public-sector wages cap was, in hindsight, instrumental in delivering the party majority government."

Since coming into office the party has officially achieved two election commitments: enshrining Sydney Water and Hunter Water as permanent public institutions via a Constitutional amendment; raising the stamp duty exemption threshold for first-home buyers from $650k to $800k.

== Attempted party reforms ==
Between 2009 and 2014, the Independent Commission Against Corruption (ICAC) began or completed a series of investigations into the behaviours of a number of Labor politicians, including Angela D'Amore, Tony Kelly, Ian Macdonald, Eddie Obeid, Karyn Paluzzano, and Joe Tripodi. The ICAC made a series of adverse findings against all six politicians, although Paluzzano was the only one to face criminal charges. For bringing the party into disrepute, Kelly had his membership of Labor terminated in 2011; both Macdonald and Obeid had their membership terminated in 2013; and Tripodi suffered the same fate in 2014. Other investigations and criminal charges were laid against Craig Thomson, a federal politician from New South Wales, and Michael Williamson, a senior Labor official, also from New South Wales. Both Thomson and Williamson were adversely implicated in the Health Services Union expenses affair. Their membership of NSW Labor was terminated in 2014.

Seeking to stamp out perceived corruption and factional infighting, Senator John Faulkner began a process of reforms that proposed to include rank–and–file members in decisions such as the selection of candidates for Senate and Legislative Council vacancies and party tickets, and a vote in the direct election of the New South Wales parliamentary leaders. However, Faulkner's reform proposals were mostly rejected at NSW Labor's 2014 conference. The direct election of party leader gained support with effect from after the 2015 election.

Following the suspension of the general secretary of NSW Labor, Kaila Murnain in 2019, the NSW Labor Leader Jodi McKay and federal Labor Leader Anthony Albanese announced a further review into the party. Michael Lavarch conducted the review after Murnain admitted to the Independent Commission Against Corruption (New South Wales) that she was aware that billionaire property developer Huang Xiangmo made an illegal $100,000 donation to NSW Labor in 2016. The Lavarch Review recommended changes to internal governance and oversight mechanisms within NSW Labor including the establishment of a State Executive Board to oversee the existing NSW Labor Administrative Committee.

== Factions ==
NSW Labor Party Parliamentary Caucus

Structure
- Centre Unity: 40 / 61
- Hard Left: 11 / 61
- Soft Left: 9 / 61
- Unaligned: 1 / 61

Like other branches of the ALP across the country, NSW Labor is largely divided into Left and Right factions. The NSW Branch is currently controlled by NSW Centre Unity (aligned to Labor Right nationally) both in parliament and at Annual Conferences. There are two subfactions (or "fractions") of the NSW Left, referred to as the "hard left" and the "soft" or "Ferguson left".

There is one factionally unaligned member of the Parliamentary party. Due to the nature of the Party's Annual Conference, non-factional delegates are exceedingly rare and so non-factional representation is effectively nil.

== Country Labor ==
Country Labor was a subsection of the ALP, and was used as a designation by candidates contesting elections in rural areas. It functioned as a sort of ginger group within the party, and was somewhat analogous to its youth wing. The Country Labor Party was registered as a separate party in NSW, until 2021 and was also registered with the Australian Electoral Commission (AEC) for federal elections.

The creation of a separate designation for rural candidates was first suggested at the June 1999 ALP state conference in NSW. In May 2000, following Labor's success at the 2000 Benalla by-election in Victoria, Kim Beazley announced that the ALP intended to register a separate "Country Labor Party" with the AEC; this occurred in October 2000. The Country Labor designation is most frequently used in New South Wales. According to the ALP's financial statements for the 2015–16 financial year, NSW Country Labor had around 2,600 members (around 17 percent of the party total), but almost no assets. It recorded a severe funding shortfall at the 2015 NSW state election, and had to rely on a $1.68 million loan from the party proper to remain solvent. It had been initially assumed that the party proper could provide the money from its own resources, but the NSW Electoral Commission ruled that this was impermissible because the parties were registered separately. Instead the party proper had to loan Country Labor the required funds at a commercial interest rate.

The dedicated Country Labor political party was de-registered in October 2021 in a major party reform. Instead of a dedicated political party, the ALP instead pledged to dedicate "30 per cent of winnable seats in upper house ticket to people who live in regional NSW".

== Other Labor-aligned groups ==
In New South Wales, a number of groups known as Labor Action Committees have been formed as associates of the NSW branch. These groups are divided along policy, cultural and professional lines. They include the following:

- Vietnamese Friends of Labor
- Arabic Friends of Labor
- Filipino Friends of Labor
- Sub-Continent Friends of Labor
- Irish Friends of Labor
- Hellenic Caucus
- Labor Environment Action Network (LEAN)
- Labor Friends of Palestine
- Labor Israel Action Committee
- Labor Action for Multiculturalism Policy (LAMP)
- Labor for the Arts (L4TA)
- Labor for Innovation
- Labor for Treaty
- Labor Science Network
- Macedonian Friends of Labor
- Aboriginal Labor Network
- Labor Ending Homelessness Action Committee
- Labor for Defence Veterans (LFDV)
- Labor For Gambling Reform

== Leadership ==
=== List of parliamentary leaders ===
#	Leader		Term start	Term end	Time in office	Premier	Departure notes
1		Steering Committee of 5	July 1891	October 1893		No	Caucus decision to elect a leader
2		Joseph Cook	October 1893	25 June 1894		No	Left the Labor Party
3		James McGowen	25 June 1894	30 June 1913	19 years, 5 days	Yes (1910–13)	Deposed
4		William Holman	30 June 1913	15 November 1916	3 years, 138 days	Yes (1913–1920) (As Nationalist after 1916)	Expelled from the Labor Party
5		Ernest Durack	15 November 1916	21 February 1917	98 days	No	Resigned
6		John Storey	21 February 1917	5 October 1921	4 years, 226 days	Yes (1920–1921)	Died in office
7		James Dooley	5 October 1921	31 July 1923	1 year, 299 days	Yes (1921–1921, 1921–1922)	Expelled from the Labor Party by the state executive
*		Greg McGirr	9 March 1923	16 April 1923	38 days	No	Imposed by the state executive
*		Bill Dunn	16 April 1923	31 July 1923	106 days	No	Imposed by the federal executive
8		Jack Lang	31 July 1923	5 September 1939	16 years, 36 days	Yes (1925–1927, 1930–1932)	Deposed following a caucus vote
9		William McKell	5 September 1939	6 February 1947	7 years, 154 days	Yes (1941–1947)	Resigned to become Governor-General
10		James McGirr	6 February 1947	3 April 1952	5 years, 57 days	Yes (1947–1952)	Resigned
11		Joseph Cahill	3 April 1952	22 October 1959	7 years, 202 days	Yes (1952–1959)	Died in office
12		Bob Heffron	22 October 1959	30 April 1964	4 years, 191 days	Yes (1959–1964)	Resigned
13		Jack Renshaw	30 April 1964	2 December 1968	4 years, 216 days	Yes (1964–1965)	Resigned
14		Pat Hills	2 December 1968	3 December 1973	5 years, 1 day	No	Deposed following the 1973 election
15		Neville Wran	3 December 1973	4 July 1986	12 years, 213 days	Yes (1976–1986)	Resigned
16		Barrie Unsworth	4 July 1986	11 April 1988	1 year, 282 days	Yes (1986–1988)	Resigned following the 1988 election
17		Bob Carr	11 April 1988	3 August 2005	17 years, 114 days	Yes (1995–2005)	Resigned
18		Morris Iemma	3 August 2005	5 September 2008	3 years, 33 days	Yes (2005–2008)	Resigned
19		Nathan Rees	5 September 2008	3 December 2009	1 year, 89 days	Yes (2008–2009)	Deposed following a caucus vote
20		Kristina Keneally	3 December 2009	31 March 2011	1 year, 118 days	Yes (2009–2011)	Resigned following the 2011 election
21		John Robertson	31 March 2011	23 December 2014	3 years, 267 days	No	Resigned following the 2014 Sydney hostage crisis
*		Linda Burney	23 December 2014	5 January 2015	13 days	No	Interim leader until the 2015 leadership election
22		Luke Foley	5 January 2015	8 November 2018	3 years, 307 days	No	Resigned
23		Michael Daley	8 November 2018	25 March 2019	137 days	No	Resigned following the 2019 state election
*		Penny Sharpe	25 March 2019	29 June 2019	96 days	No	Interim leader until the 2019 leadership election
24		Jodi McKay	29 June 2019	28 May 2021	1 year, 333 days	No	Resigned following the 2021 Upper Hunter by-election
*	Adam Searle MLC addresses NSW Labor conference 2016	Adam Searle	28 May 2021	4 June 2021	7 days	No	Interim leader until the 2021 leadership election
25		Chris Minns	4 June 2021	Incumbent	5 years, 171 days	Yes (2023–present)	

=== List of deputy parliamentary leaders ===
Deputy leader	Term start	Term end	Time in office	Deputy premier	Leader	Departure notes
Unknown	1893	1923			Joseph Cook	
Unknown	1893	1923			James McGowen	
Unknown	1893	1923			William Holman	
Unknown	1893	1923			Ernest Durack	
Unknown	1893	1923			John Storey	
Bill Dunn	1922	1923		No	James Dooley	Became leader
Bill Dunn	1922	1923		No	Greg McGirr	Became leader
Peter Loughlin	1923	1926		No	Bill Dunn	
Peter Loughlin	1923	1926		No	Jack Lang	
Jack Baddeley	1927	1949		Yes (1941–1949)	Jack Lang	
Jack Baddeley	1927	1949		Yes (1941–1949)	William McKell	
Jack Baddeley	1927	1949		Yes (1941–1949)	James McGirr	
Joseph Cahill	1949	3 April 1952		Yes (1949–1952)	James McGirr	Became leader
Bob Heffron	1953	22 October 1959		Yes (1953–1959)	Joseph Cahill	Became leader
Jack Renshaw	22 October 1959	30 April 1964	4 years, 191 days	Yes (1959–1964)	Bob Heffron	Became leader
Pat Hills	30 April 1964	1968		Yes (1964–1965)	Jack Renshaw	Became leader
Syd Einfeld	1968	1973		No	Pat Hills	
Jack Ferguson	3 December 1973	10 February 1984	10 years, 69 days	Yes (1976–1984)	Neville Wran	Resigned
Ron Mulock	10 February 1984	25 March 1988	4 years, 44 days	Yes (1984–1988)	Neville Wran	Resigned following the 1988 election
Ron Mulock	10 February 1984	25 March 1988	4 years, 44 days	Yes (1984–1988)	Barrie Unsworth	Resigned following the 1988 election
Andrew Refshauge	11 April 1988	3 August 2005	17 years, 114 days	Yes (1995–2005)	Bob Carr	Resigned
John Watkins	3 August 2005	3 September 2008	3 years, 31 days	Yes (2005–2008)	Morris Iemma	Resigned
Carmel Tebbutt	3 September 2008	28 March 2011	2 years, 206 days	Yes (2008–2011)	Nathan Rees	Resigned following the 2011 election
Carmel Tebbutt	3 September 2008	28 March 2011	2 years, 206 days	Yes (2008–2011)	Kristina Keneally	Resigned following the 2011 election
Linda Burney	28 March 2011	7 March 2015	3 years, 344 days	No	John Robertson	Moved to federal politics
Linda Burney	28 March 2011	7 March 2015	3 years, 344 days	No	Luke Foley	Moved to federal politics
Michael Daley	7 March 2015	10 November 2018	2 years, 248 days	No	Luke Foley	Became leader
Penny Sharpe	10 November 2018	25 March 2019	135 days	No	Michael Daley	Became interim leader
Yasmin Catley	29 June 2019	28 May 2021	1 year, 333 days	No	Jodi McKay	Resigned
Prue Car	8 June 2021	incumbent	5 years, 167 days	Yes (2023–present)	Chris Minns	

== Executive leaders ==
=== Presidents ===
President	Period
Frederick Flowers	1895–1898
Frederick Flowers	1906–1907
Ernest Farrar	1912–1914
Richard Meagher	1914–1915
Jack FitzGerald	1915–1916
Jack Power	1921–1923
Albert Willis	1923–1925
Abner McAlpine	1940–1943
Francis Kelly	1943–1947
John Ferguson	1947–1952
Bill Colbourne	1952–1955
Jim Shortell	1955–1956
Fred Campbell	1956–1960
Charlie Oliver	1960–1971
John Ducker	1971–1979
Paul Keating	1979–1983
John MacBean	1983–1989
Terry Sheahan	1989–1997
Peter Sams	1997–1998
Steve Hutchins	1998–2002
Ursula Stephens	2002–2006
Bernie Riordan	2006–2010
Michael Lee	2010–2014
Mark Lennon	2014–2021
Michelle Rowland	2021–2024
Dr Tricia Kavanagh	2024–current

=== General secretaries ===
General Secretary	Period
Walter Evans	1939–1940
William Dickson	1940–1941
John Stewart	1941–1950
Ernest Gerard Wright	1950–1952
Charles Wilson Anderson	1952–1954
Bill Colbourne	1954–1969
Peter Westerway	1969–1973
Geoff Cahill	1973–1976
Graham Richardson	1976–1983
Stephen Loosley	1983–1990
John Della Bosca	1990–1999
Eric Roozendaal	1999–2004
Mark Arbib	2004–2007
Karl Bitar	2007–2008
Matt Thistlethwaite	2008–2010
Sam Dastyari	2010–2013
Jamie Clements	2013–2016
Kaila Murnain	2016–2019
Bob Nanva	2019–2023
Dominic Ofner	2023–present

== Electoral performance ==
=== Legislative Assembly ===
Election	Leader	Votes	%	Seats	+/–	Position	Status
1891	Steering Committee	37,216	20.62	35 / 141	▲35	▲3rd	Crossbench
1894	James McGowen	33,143	16.49	15 / 125	▼20	3rd	Crossbench
1895	James McGowen	20,028	13.20	18 / 125	▲3	3rd	Crossbench
1898	James McGowen	21,556	12.18	19 / 125	▲1	3rd	Crossbench
1901	James McGowen	35,952	18.44	24 / 125	▲5	3rd	Crossbench
1904	James McGowen	92,426	23.3	25 / 90	▲1	▲2nd	Opposition
1907	James McGowen	152,704	33.31	32 / 90	▲7	2nd	Opposition
1910	James McGowen	280,056	48.92	46 / 90	▲14	▲1st	Majority
1913	William Holman	311,747	46.63	49 / 90	▲3	1st	Majority
1917	John Storey	262,655	42.63	33 / 90	▼16	▼2nd	Opposition
1920	John Storey	68,175	43.03	43 / 90	▲10	▲1st	Majority
1922	John Storey	85,361	38.37	36 / 90	▼7	▼2nd	Opposition
1925	Jack Lang	108,225	45.99	46 / 90	▲10	▲1st	Majority
1927	Jack Lang	488,306	43.00	40 / 90	▼6	1st	Opposition
1930	Jack Lang	729,914	55.05	55 / 90	▲15	1st	Majority
1932	Jack Lang	536,897	40.16	24 / 90	▼31	▼2nd	Opposition
1935	Jack Lang	532,486	42.42	29 / 90	▲5	2nd	Opposition
1938	Jack Lang	412,063	34.82	28 / 90	▼1	2nd	Opposition
1941	William McKell	706,014	50.8	54 / 90	▲26	▲1st	Majority
1944	William McKell	572,600	45.2	56 / 90	▲2	1st	Majority
1947	James McGirr	730,194	45.95	52 / 90	▼4	1st	Majority
1950	James McGirr	753,268	46.75	46 / 94	▼2	1st	Minority
1953	Joseph Cahill	852,276	55.03	57 / 94	▲11	1st	Majority
1956	Joseph Cahill	800,410	47.25	50 / 94	▼7	1st	Majority
1959	Joseph Cahill	838,836	49.12	49 / 94	▼1	1st	Majority
1962	Bob Heffron	936,047	48.57	54 / 94	▲5	1st	Majority
1965	Jack Renshaw	883,824	43.31	45 / 94	▼9	1st	Opposition
1968	Jack Renshaw	931,563	43.1	39 / 94	▼6	1st	Opposition
1971	Pat Hills	1,007,538	45.02	45 / 96	▲6	1st	Opposition
1973	Pat Hills	1,069,614	42.93	44 / 99	▼1	1st	Opposition
1976	Neville Wran	1,342,038	49.75	50 / 99	▲6	1st	Majority
1978	Neville Wran	1,615,949	57.77	63 / 99	▲13	1st	Majority
1981	Neville Wran	1,564,622	55.73	69 / 99	▲6	1st	Majority
1984	Neville Wran	1,466,413	48.77	58 / 99	▼11	1st	Majority
1988	Barrie Unsworth	1,233,612	38.48	43 / 109	▼15	1st	Opposition
1991	Bob Carr	1,204,066	39.05	46 / 99	▲3	1st	Opposition
1995	Bob Carr	1,408,616	41.26	50 / 99	▲4	1st	Majority
1999	Bob Carr	1,576,886	42.21	55 / 93	▲5	1st	Majority
2003	Bob Carr	1,631,018	42.68	55 / 93	Steady	1st	Majority
2007	Morris Iemma	1,535,872	38.98	52 / 93	▼3	1st	Majority
2011	Kristina Keneally	1,061,352	25.55	20 / 93	▼32	▼2nd	Opposition
2015	Luke Foley	1,500,855	34.08	34 / 93	▲14	2nd	Opposition
2019	Michael Daley	1,516,143	33.31	36 / 93	▲2	▲1st	Opposition
2023	Chris Minns	1,738,081	36.97	45 / 93	▲9	1st	Minority

=== House of Representatives ===
Election	Votes	%	Seats	+/–
1901	38,822	18.40	6 / 26	▲6
1903	58,494	21.30	7 / 26	▲1
1906	133,091	38.50	11 / 27	▲4
1910	252,194	51.10	17 / 27	▲6
1913	326,326	46.90	12 / 27	▼5
1914	309,862	52.20	14 / 27	▲2
1917	268,584	41.70	10 / 27	▼4
1919	306,951	46.00	14 / 27	▲4
1922	232,211	42.60	13 / 28	▼1
1925	520,385	46.30	11 / 28	▼2
1928	536,558	52.10	14 / 28	▲3
1929	587,691	51.50	20 / 28	▲6
1931	214,973	16.40	3 / 28	▼17
1934	132,779	9.40	1 / 28	▼2
1937	635,511	45.30	11 / 28	▲10
1940	540,055	35.30	12 / 28	▲1
1943	846,885	53.80	21 / 28	▲9
1946	880,493	51.40	19 / 28	▼2
1949	849,033	46.90	23 / 47	▲4
1951	898,883	49.10	24 / 47	▲1
1954	923,469	52.30	25 / 47	▲1
1955	836,592	49.60	21 / 46	▼4
1958	900,483	47.10	22 / 46	▲1
1961	1,041,238	52.20	27 / 46	▲5
1963	987,228	47.50	20 / 46	▼7
1966	862,631	40.70	17 / 46	▼3
1969	1,074,916	47.70	22 / 45	▲5
1972	1,252,047	51.90	28 / 45	▲6
1974	1,400,255	52.70	25 / 45	▼3
1975	1,260,335	45.50	17 / 45	▼8
1977	1,201,560	42.40	17 / 43	Steady
1980	1,357,557	46.40	18 / 43	▲1
1983	1,512,012	50.10	24 / 43	▲6
1984	1,458,856	48.26	29 / 51	▲5
1987	1,438,985	45.17	28 / 51	▼1
1990	1,380,780	41.16	30 / 51	▲2
1993	1,714,512	48.36	33 / 50	▲3
1996	1,453,542	39.56	20 / 50	▼13
1998	1,489,021	40.12	22 / 50	▲2
2001	1,380,822	36.45	20 / 50	▼2
2004	1,412,418	36.70	21 / 50	▼1
2007	1,791,171	44.12	28 / 49	▲7
2010	1,494,490	37.28	26 / 48	▼2
2013	1,433,842	34.52	18 / 48	▼8
2016	1,611,549	36.93	24 / 47	▲6
2019	1,568,223	34.56	24 / 47	Steady
2022	1,475,210	33.47	26 / 47	▲2
2025	1,686,994	35.20	28 / 46	▲2

=== Senate ===
Election	Votes	%	Seats won	Seats after	+/–
2019	1,400,295	29.82	2 / 6	5 / 12	Steady
2022	1,461,172	30.44	2 / 6	4 / 12	▼1
2025	1,876,713	37.63	2 / 6	4 / 12	Steady
