= North Metropolitan Region =

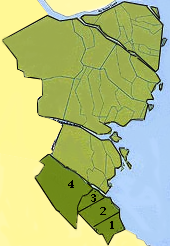
North Metropolitan Region: 1- Vicente López 2- San Isidro; 3- San Fernando 4- Tigre

The North Metropolitan Region (also called North Zone) (Región Metropolitana Norte in Spanish) is an intermunicipality zone in Buenos Aires Province, Argentina, created on 10 April 2000. The partidos that comprise this region are San Fernando, San Isidro, Vicente López and Tigre.

It has a continental surface of about 257 km^{2} and an insular surface of 1,140 km^{2}. It has a population of about 1,118,000 people.
