= Kaila Murnain =

Australian politician

- Born: Newcastle, New South Wales
- Education: University of New South Wales
- Years active: Political party administrator
- Known for: General Secretary of NSW Labor (2016 – 2019)

Kaila Murnain is an Australian politician who was the first female General Secretary of NSW Labor.

== Early life and education ==
Murnain was born in Newcastle, to parents Anne and Neil, and grew up in Narrabri in north western New South Wales. Murnain attended Narrabri Public School and Narrabri High School. Her mother, Anne Murnain, contested the federal seat of Gwydir for the Australian Labor Party in 1998 and 2001. Murnain joined the Labor party herself when she was old enough, in 2000, and attended her first party conference at 15 years of age. She campaigned for Australia to become a republic.

Murnain moved to Sydney to attend the University of New South Wales to complete a Bachelor of Social Science. Murnain worked three jobs while studying. She is currently undertaking a Masters of Business Administration at the Australian Graduate School of Management (UNSW).

Murnain is married to Tom Hollywood, an Army Reservist and Labor staffer who has worked for NSW Labor MLC Sophie Cotsis.

== Career ==
Murnain worked as an electorate officer for Michael Daley MP from 2005 to 2007. She served as a policy advisor for Ageing and Disability Services to Kristina Keneally MP from 2007 to 2008. In 2008 Murnain began working at the NSW Labor Party head office as an organiser running campaigns in local, state and federal by-elections and general elections. With the support of the Australian Political Exchange Council, Murnain undertook an Individual Study Tour of the United States of America in 2012 and aided the Democratic Party campaign. In 2013 Murnain was appointed Assistant General Secretary of NSW Labor.

In February 2016 Murnain was elected by ballot as the first female General Secretary of NSW Labor. Federal Opposition Leader, Bill Shorten, backed Ms Murnain, then aged 29, stating that "She's not to be underestimated. She'll make a strong NSW General Secretary."

In response to a report into the status of women within the NSW division of the Labor Party, Murnain stated that her goal as General Secretary is to achieve cultural reform and strengthen Labor's affirmative action rules. Murnain introduced the Party's first code of conduct and announced the introduction of compulsory ethics seminars for newly elected representatives. At the 2016 NSW Labor Conference delegates voted in affirmative action reforms such as a women's mentoring program and targets for women to have equal representation in all elected party positions, across all council, state and federal electorates, by 2027.

In the lead up to the 2016 federal election, Murnain led a campaign strategy similar to Obama's "organising to win" campaign. Labor NSW won 24 of the available 47 seats, with half of NSW Labor seats held by women, meeting the party's affirmative action goal.

Murnain resigned as General Secretary of NSW Labor on 17 October 2019.

Murnain works as a casual academic in psychology at the University of England and as an Associate Partner, Communications at SEC Newgate in Sydney.
