= NSW Council for Civil Liberties =

Australian advocacy group

- Formation: 1963
- Type: Non-profit
- Purpose: Civil liberties advocacy
- Headquarters: Sydney
- Region served: New South Wales
- President: Lydia Shelly
- Website: http://www.nswccl.org.au/

Founded in 1963, the charter of the NSW Council for Civil Liberties is to protect the rights and liberties of Australian citizens (as long as they do not infringe on the rights and freedoms of others) and to oppose the abusive or excessive exercise of power by the state against its people.

The council has a committee elected by volunteers whose primary role is to influence public debate and government policy on a range of human rights issues, aiming to secure amendments to laws and policies which are perceived to unreasonably abridge civil liberties. Additionally, it may provide authoritative support and legal representation to citizens and groups facing civil liberties problems. Typical issues have included advocacy of a bill of rights, the death penalty, prisoners issues, free speech, sniffer dogs, double jeopardy, freedom of information, the right to protest, ATSI (Aboriginal and Torres Strait Islanders) rights, asylum seekers, drug reform and privacy.

Since 2006, the organisation has held Special Consultative status with the United Nations.

== Organisation ==
The council elects a committee of volunteers to manage the operation of the organisation. This committee consists of 15 ordinary members. This is in addition to the NSWCCL Executive. The current Executive are:

- Timothy Roberts (President)
- Lydia Shelly (Vice-President)
- Martin Bibby (Vice-President)
- Adam Connor (Secretary)
- Stephen Blanks (Treasurer)

=== Funding ===
The council is primarily funded through annual subscriptions of members, donations, and other sources as determined by the Committee. It is an incorporated organisation.

== Positions ==
=== Police powers ===
The council has historically criticised overreach and the extension of powers by law enforcement agencies and especially the NSW Police. In 2020, the NSWCCL expressed concern that the setting of targets for searches by the NSW Police meant that police officers were breaching the law and conducting illegal searches. In 2024, they criticised the proposed introduction of 'wanding' powers for the police in an attempt to reduce knife crime in NSW.

=== Death penalty ===
In 2015, the NSWCCL joined other human rights groups to launch a 'blueprint' for what steps the Australian Government must take to end the death penalty across the world. This included pushing for a universal adoption of a global moratorium on the death penalty and putting in place stronger legislation to prevent the Australian Federal Police from sharing information to other law enforcement agencies which might result in the use of the death penalty.

=== Free speech ===
In 2023, the council expressed concern over proposed hate speech laws by the NSW Government and the President, Lydia Shelly, stated "We must not allow changes to our laws that will see our capacity to challenges ideas, positions and beliefs be taken away from us.”

=== Government surveillance ===
The NSWCCL's position is that the Australian government must have the "prior informed consent" of citizens for any communications surveillance or data collection it engages in. The Council has repeatedly called for the creation of a Public Interest Monitor which would have the power to review applications for surveillance device warrants, to request further information about the warrant, and to address the person or body which has issued the warrant.

=== Terrorism laws ===
The organisation has noted the encroaching on "the fundamental rights and liberties of Australians" by onerous counter-terrorism laws. In October 2023, the NSWCCL submitted that the proposed Counter-Terrorism and Other Legislation Amendment Bill 2023 is "unjustified, disproportionate, and should be rejected in its entirety" on the basis of extending secrecy provisions and the control orders. Earlier work by the NSWCCL include a submission to in the inquiry into the Anti-Terrorism Bill (No.2) 2005, where the Council criticised the Bill as it effectively "repeals common law rights".

=== LGBTQI+ rights ===
The council has a long history of advocacy for LGBTQI+ rights and as recently as November, 2022, adopted a formal policy. This document reiterates the Councils position for many LGBTQI+ rights issues including: supporting a ban on LGBTQI+ conversion practices, opposing the privileging of religious rights at the expense of LGBTQI+ ones, and also opposing any discrimination in healthcare and education settings.

=== Privacy ===
Former President of NSW Council for Civil Liberties Stephen Blanks raised questions about the use of drones for police investigations of crime scenes. In June 2015 Blanks said,"There are obvious benefits for crime investigation as long as guidelines are in place which clearly say how the information is going to be used and how inappropriate access is going to be prevented."

== History ==
=== Founding in 1963 ===
The NSW Council for Civil Liberties was established in the closing months of 1963. The organisation came into being in response to a police raid on a Kings Cross party, a raid without a warrant. Among the partygoers was Ken Buckley, a Senior Lecturer in Economic History at University of Sydney. Incensed by this incident, Buckley publicly campaigned against arbitrary and oppressive actions by the police. He was later joined by Dr Dick Klugman and Jack Sweeney QC in this campaign and to seek expressions of interests for the foundation of a "permanent organisation concerned with civil liberties".

The foundation meeting was held at Sydney University on 13 September 1963 and among those present or who had expressed interest were notable figures such as Neville Wran, John Kerr QC, Lionel Murphy QC, James McClelland, Professor Alan Stout, and Berenice Granger (later Berenice Buckley).

=== 1960s & 1970s ===
The late 1960s and 70s saw the NSWCCL's membership rapidly increased as did press coverage of its work. Notably, during this time period the Council spent a significant amount of time defending the right to protest of conscientious objectors to the Vietnam War. It also set up a network of legal observers to attend protests and provide evidence in court hearings.

The CCL was also involved in 1976 in the creation of the Australian Council for Civil Liberties which was to serve as a national organisation of affiliated Council for Civil Liberties in Australia. The inaugural President and Secretary of this organisation was Ken Buckley and George Zdenkowski of NSWCCL.

=== 2000s ===
Paul Lynch MP, Shadow Attorney General acknowledges the contribution of the NSWCCL in Parliament in November 2013 on the occasion of its 50th anniversary.

=== Terrorism and Civil Liberties ===
In a recent speech to the NSW Council for Civil Liberties, High Court Justice Michael Kirby delivered an important reminder to all civil libertarians:

"Let there be no doubt that real terrorists are the enemies of civil liberties...

"Nevertheless...we must also recognise...the need to draw a distinction between 'terrorists' and those who are simply objecting to injustice as they see it. In his day, Mahatma Gandhi was certainly called a terrorist. So was Nelson Mandela...

"[We must also recognise] that, in responding to violent antagonists, democratic communities must do so in a way, as far as possible, consistent with the defence of civil liberties."

In 2022 the organisation signed an open letter objecting to increased penalties for protestors under the Roads and Crimes Legislation Amendment Bill.
