= Ferguson Left =

Organised faction of the New South Wales Labor Party

Ferguson Left (Soft Left)
- Founder: Jack Ferguson
- Youth wing: Active within Australian Young Labor
- Ideology: Democratic socialism; Progressivism; Social democracy
- Political position: Centre-left to left-wing
- Colours: Red

The Ferguson Left (also known as the Soft Left in New South Wales) is a political sub-faction in New South Wales within the Australian Labor Party (ALP) founded by Jack Ferguson.

In New South Wales, the Soft Left traces its roots to the supporters of Peter Baldwin, who led the Steering Committee (previous name for the New South Wales Socialist Left) during its rise in the late 1970s and early 1980s. It was the dominant group on the Steering Committee until March 1989, when the Soft Left's John Faulkner was succeeded by the Hard Left's Anthony Albanese in an internal faction ballot for the leading position of Assistant General Secretary of the New South Wales Labor Party. The new Hard Left majority changed the name of the faction to the Socialist Left in November 1989. The traditional base for the Soft Left has been rank-and-file Labor activists. Strategically, it has advocated a continuation of the Baldwinite bottom-up strategy of mobilising the grassroots membership to win party positions. The large Australian trade union, United Voice supported the Soft Left until 2010. In 2014 the sub-faction in New South Wales was led by Paul Lynch, and it currently still exists in New South Wales with the support of the CFMEU. The Soft Left continues to enjoy the support of the majority of Labor Party members in Western Sydney and Newcastle.

In Victoria, there was a separate and distinct Ferguson faction led by Martin Ferguson, who was not affiliated with the Ferguson Left in New South Wales. Following the retirement of Martin Ferguson, the Ferguson faction reunited with the Victorian Socialist Left in 2014–15. Past federal members included Martin Ferguson and Julia Gillard.

== See also ==
- Labor Left
- Labor Right
- Australian Labor Party
