= Electoral results for the district of Strathfield =

Australian district election results

Strathfield, an electoral district of the Legislative Assembly in the Australian state of New South Wales, was first established in 1988, largely replacing Burwood.

== Members for Strathfield ==
Election	Member	Party
1988	Paul Zammit	Liberal
1991	Paul Zammit	Liberal
1995	Paul Zammit	Liberal
1996 by	Bruce MacCarthy	Liberal
1999	Paul Whelan	Labor
2003	Virginia Judge	Labor
2007	Virginia Judge	Labor
2011	Charles Casuscelli	Liberal
2015	Jodi McKay	Labor
2019	Jodi McKay	Labor
2022	Jason Yat-Sen Li	Labor
2023	Jason Yat-Sen Li	Labor

== Election results ==
=== Elections in the 2020s ===
==== 2023 ====
2023 New South Wales state election: Strathfield
Party	Candidate	Votes	%	±%
Labor	Jason Li	26,249	51.9	+7.1
Liberal	John-Paul Baladi	16,775	33.1	−5.4
Greens	Courtney Buckley	4,749	9.4	+0.6
Sustainable Australia	Wally Crocker	1,588	3.1	+3.1
Animal Justice	Maurie Saidi	1,257	2.5	+0.5
Total formal votes		50,618	97.1	+0.3
Informal votes		1,495	2.9	−0.3
Turnout		52,113	88.6	+0.8
Two-party-preferred result
Labor	Jason Li	30,228	63.0	+7.8
Liberal	John-Paul Baladi	17,717	37.0	−7.8
Labor hold		Swing	+7.8	

==== 2022 by-election ====
2022 Strathfield state by-election
Party	Candidate	Votes	%	±%
Labor	Jason Yat-Sen Li	18,034	41.05	−3.25
Liberal	Bridget Sakr	15,921	36.24	−2.64
Independent	Elizabeth Farrelly	4,328	9.85	+9.85
Greens	Courtney Buckley	2,930	6.67	−2.12
Sustainable Australia	Ellie Robertson	1,795	4.09	+4.09
Animal Justice	Rohan Laxmanalal	920	2.09	−0.13
Total formal votes		43,928	98.42	+1.44
Informal votes		703	1.58	−1.44
Turnout		44,631	80.82	−8.22
Two-party-preferred result
Labor	Jason Yat-Sen Li	21,670	55.81	+0.81
Liberal	Bridget Sakr	17,160	44.19	−0.81
Labor hold		Swing	+0.81	

=== Elections in the 2010s ===
==== 2019 ====
2019 New South Wales state election: Strathfield
Party	Candidate	Votes	%	±%
Labor	Jodi McKay	20,475	44.30	+1.95
Liberal	Philip Madirazza	17,972	38.89	−3.82
Greens	Crisetta MacLeod	4,061	8.79	−0.43
Keep Sydney Open	Vinayak Orekondy	1,443	3.12	+3.12
Conservatives	Jack Liang	1,237	2.68	+2.68
Animal Justice	Simon Fletcher	1,029	2.23	+2.23
Total formal votes		46,217	96.98	+0.15
Informal votes		1,437	3.02	−0.15
Turnout		47,654	89.15	−1.52
Two-party-preferred result
Labor	Jodi McKay	23,519	55.00	+3.22
Liberal	Philip Madirazza	19,245	45.00	−3.22
Labor hold		Swing	+3.22	

==== 2015 ====
2015 New South Wales state election: Strathfield
Party	Candidate	Votes	%	±%
Liberal	Charles Casuscelli	19,884	42.7	−5.1
Labor	Jodi McKay	19,721	42.4	+7.4
Greens	Lance Dale	4,292	9.2	−1.9
Christian Democrats	David Brook	1,573	3.4	+0.0
No Land Tax	Stephen Chehab	1,092	2.3	+2.3
Total formal votes		46,562	96.8	+0.1
Informal votes		1,523	3.2	−0.1
Turnout		48,085	90.7	+2.6
Two-party-preferred result
Labor	Jodi McKay	22,371	51.8	+8.2
Liberal	Charles Casuscelli	20,829	48.2	−8.2
Labor gain from Liberal		Swing	+8.2	

==== 2011 ====
2011 New South Wales state election: Strathfield
Party	Candidate	Votes	%	±%
Liberal	Charles Casuscelli	20,001	45.6	+16.3
Labor	Virginia Judge	15,581	35.6	−16.6
Greens	Lance Dale	5,805	13.2	+3.9
Christian Democrats	Bill Shailer	1,268	2.9	−0.4
Independent	Mark Sharma	1,173	2.7	+2.7
Total formal votes		43,828	97.3	0.0
Informal votes		1,209	2.7	0.0
Turnout		45,037	91.8	
Two-party-preferred result
Liberal	Charles Casuscelli	21,487	54.4	+19.5
Labor	Virginia Judge	18,014	45.6	−19.5
Liberal gain from Labor		Swing	+19.5	

=== Elections in the 2000s ===
==== 2007 ====
2007 New South Wales state election: Strathfield
Party	Candidate	Votes	%	±%
Labor	Virginia Judge	21,717	52.1	+0.5
Liberal	Bill Carney	12,232	29.4	−0.3
Greens	Michele Sacco	3,894	9.3	+0.4
Unity	Benjamin Cai	1,874	4.5	−1.7
Christian Democrats	John Maloney	1,384	3.3	+3.1
Democrats	Patrick Garson	563	1.4	−0.1
Total formal votes		41,664	97.4	+0.1
Informal votes		1,130	2.6	−0.1
Turnout		42,794	91.7	
Two-party-preferred result
Labor	Virginia Judge	24,883	65.1	−0.1
Liberal	Bill Carney	13,349	34.9	+0.1
Labor hold		Swing	−0.1	

==== 2003 ====
2003 New South Wales state election: Strathfield
Party	Candidate	Votes	%	±%
Labor	Virginia Judge	21,056	51.1	+6.3
Liberal	Joe Tannous	11,964	29.0	−4.2
Greens	Mary Hawkins	4,248	10.3	+7.0
Unity	Alfred Tsang	2,566	6.2	+0.7
Independent	Morris Mansour	695	1.7	+1.7
Democrats	Anna Garrett	675	1.6	−2.8
Total formal votes		41,204	97.4	+0.4
Informal votes		1,090	2.6	−0.4
Turnout		42,294	90.8	
Two-party-preferred result
Labor	Virginia Judge	24,702	65.8	+7.4
Liberal	Joe Tannous	12,853	34.2	−7.4
Labor hold		Swing	+7.4	

=== Elections in the 1990s ===
==== 1999 ====
1999 New South Wales state election: Strathfield
Party	Candidate	Votes	%	±%
Labor	Paul Whelan	18,386	44.8	+4.9
Liberal	Bruce MacCarthy	13,623	33.2	−14.9
Unity	Omega Wu	2,273	5.5	+5.5
Democrats	Anna Garrett	1,800	4.4	−0.6
Greens	Mersina Soulos	1,374	3.3	+1.3
One Nation	Anthony Zeitoun	1,365	3.3	+3.3
Christian Democrats	Janne Peterson	1,117	2.7	+2.1
Outdoor Recreation	Chris Angel	460	1.1	+1.1
Voice of the People	Kwai Cheung	248	0.6	+0.6
Democratic Socialist	Stephanie Roper	207	0.5	+0.5
AAFI	John Divola	204	0.5	+0.5
Total formal votes		41,057	97.0	+2.4
Informal votes		1,277	3.0	−2.4
Turnout		42,334	92.0	
Two-party-preferred result
Labor	Paul Whelan	21,387	58.4	+11.2
Liberal	Bruce MacCarthy	15,225	41.6	−11.2
Labor gain from Liberal		Swing	+11.2	

==== 1996 by-election ====
1996 Strathfield by-election Saturday 25 May
Party	Candidate	Votes	%	±%
Liberal	Bruce MacCarthy	15,772	50.66	−2.79
Labor	Jane Timbrell	10,484	33.68	−6.67
Democrats	Amelia Newman	1,793	5.76	+0.80
Call to Australia	Janne Peterson	1,460	4.69	
Greens	Damien Maher	1,323	4.25	
Independent	Richard Hill	298	0.96	
Total formal votes		31,130	97.67	+3.21
Informal votes		744	2.33	−3.21
Turnout		31,874	83.53	−9.88
Two-party-preferred result
Liberal	Bruce MacCarthy	17,462	58.24	+2.28
Labor	Jane Timbrell	12,522	41.76	−2.28
Liberal hold		Swing	+2.28	

Paul Zammit (Liberal) resigned to successfully contest federal seat of Lowe.

==== 1995 ====
1995 New South Wales state election: Strathfield
Party	Candidate	Votes	%	±%
Liberal	Paul Zammit	17,371	53.4	−1.9
Labor	Jane Timbrell	13,114	40.4	+3.8
Democrats	Troy Anderson	1,613	5.0	−3.1
Natural Law	Stephen Doric	402	1.2	+1.2
Total formal votes		32,500	94.6	+6.4
Informal votes		1,871	5.4	−6.4
Turnout		34,371	93.4	
Two-party-preferred result
Liberal	Paul Zammit	17,928	56.0	−3.3
Labor	Jane Timbrell	14,110	44.0	+3.3
Liberal hold		Swing	−3.3	

==== 1991 ====
1991 New South Wales state election: Strathfield
Party	Candidate	Votes	%	±%
Liberal	Paul Zammit	16,593	55.4	+3.4
Labor	Michael Costa	10,942	36.5	−0.4
Democrats	Marjorie Woodman	2,426	8.1	+4.3
Total formal votes		29,961	88.2	−7.6
Informal votes		4,022	11.8	+7.6
Turnout		33,983	93.1	
Two-party-preferred result
Liberal	Paul Zammit	17,305	59.3	+1.4
Labor	Michael Costa	11,901	40.7	−1.4

=== Elections in the 1980s ===
==== 1988 ====
1988 New South Wales state election: Strathfield
Party	Candidate	Votes	%	±%
Liberal	Paul Zammit	16,931	59.6	+7.9
Labor	Mark Lennon	9,729	34.2	−11.5
Democrats	Marjorie Woodman	1,749	6.2	+3.6
Total formal votes		28,409	96.4	−1.0
Informal votes		1,068	3.6	+1.0
Turnout		29,477	93.6	
Two-party-preferred result
Liberal	Paul Zammit	17,486	62.8	+9.7
Labor	Mark Lennon	10,345	37.2	−9.7
Liberal notional hold		Swing	+9.7	
