= 1996 Strathfield state by-election =

Election result for Strathfield, New South Wales, Australia

A by-election was held for the New South Wales Legislative Assembly electorate of Strathfield on 25 May 1996 following the resignation of sitting member, Paul Zammit (Liberal), to contest federal seat of Lowe at the 1996 election.

On the same day, by-elections were held in the seats of Clarence, Orange, Pittwater and Southern Highlands.

All seats were retained by the Liberal-National Parties, with the exception of Clarence. In Strathfield, the Liberal Party gain a swing of 2.28% on a two-party preferred basis.

== Results ==
1996 Strathfield by-election Saturday 25 May
| Party | Candidate | Votes | % | ±% |
|---|---|---|---|---|
| Liberal | Bruce MacCarthy | 15,772 | 50.66 | −2.79 |
| Labor | Jane Timbrell | 10,484 | 33.68 | −6.67 |
| Democrats | Amelia Newman | 1,793 | 5.76 | +0.80 |
| Call to Australia | Janne Peterson | 1,460 | 4.69 | |
| Greens | Damien Maher | 1,323 | 4.25 | |
| Independent | Richard Hill | 298 | 0.96 | |
| Total formal votes | | 31,130 | 97.67 | +3.21 |
| Informal votes | | 744 | 2.33 | −3.21 |
| Turnout | | 31,874 | 83.53 | −9.88 |
Two-party-preferred result
| Liberal | Bruce MacCarthy | 17,462 | 58.24 | +2.28 |
| Labor | Jane Timbrell | 12,522 | 41.76 | −2.28 |
| Liberal hold | | Swing | +2.28 | |

== See also ==
- Electoral results for the district of Strathfield
- List of New South Wales state by-elections
