= Croydon Park, New South Wales =

Croydon Park
- Suburb
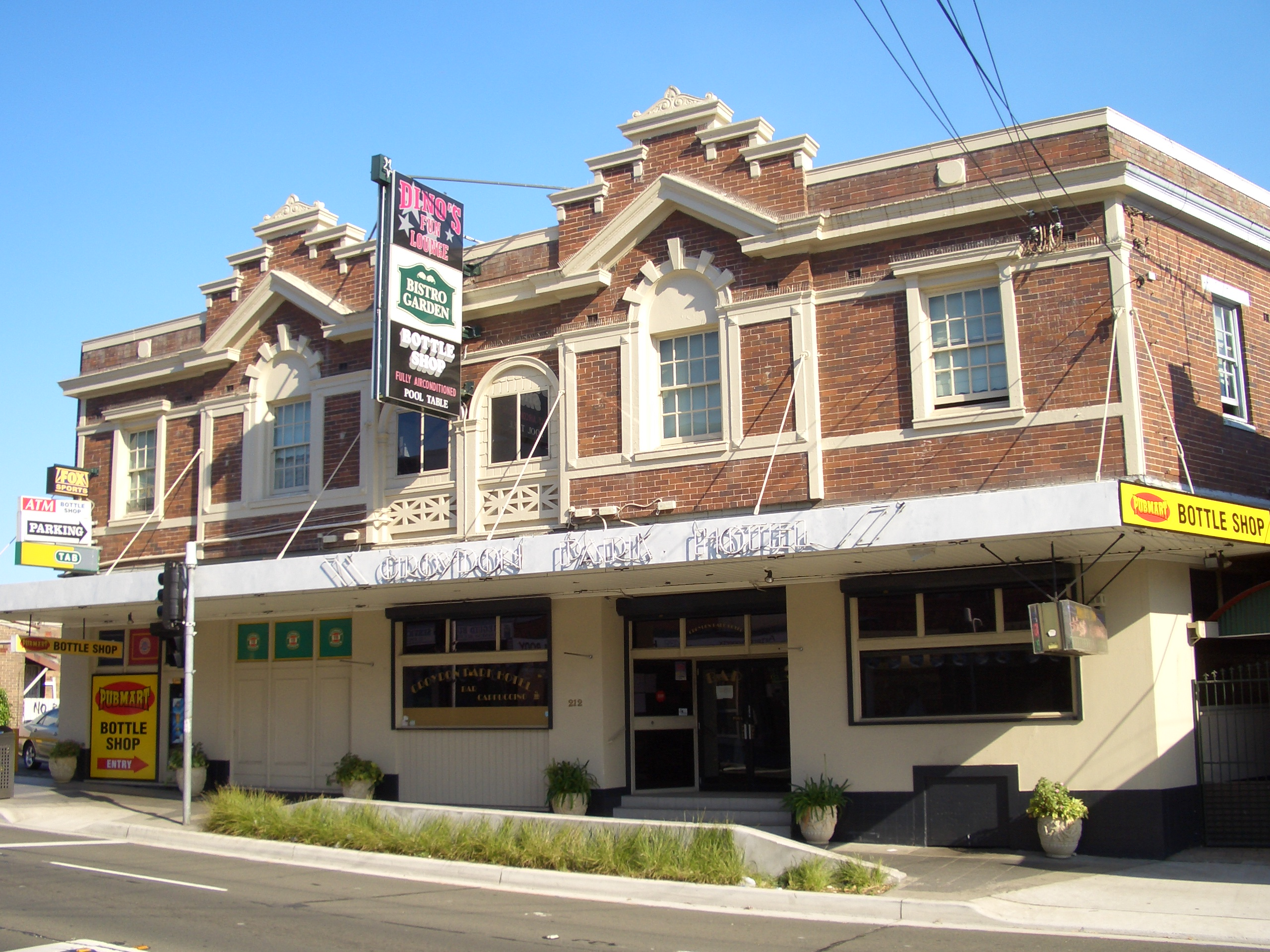
- Croydon Park Hotel

- Interactive map of Croydon Park
- Coordinates: 33°53′48″S 151°6′34″E
- Country: Australia
- State: New South Wales
- City: Sydney
- LGAs: City of Canterbury-Bankstown; Municipality of Burwood; Inner West Council
- Location: 12.1 km (7.5 mi) SW of Sydney CBD
- Established: 1914

Government
  - State electorate: Strathfield
  - Federal division: Grayndler

Area
  - Total: 2.55 km^{2} (0.98 sq mi)
- Elevation: 11 m (36 ft)

Population
  - Total: 10,929 (2021 census)
  - Density: 4,286/km^{2} (11,100/sq mi)
- Postcode: 2133
Suburbs around Croydon Park
Enfield	Burwood Heights	Croydon
Strathfield South	Croydon Park	Ashfield
Belfield	Campsie	Ashbury

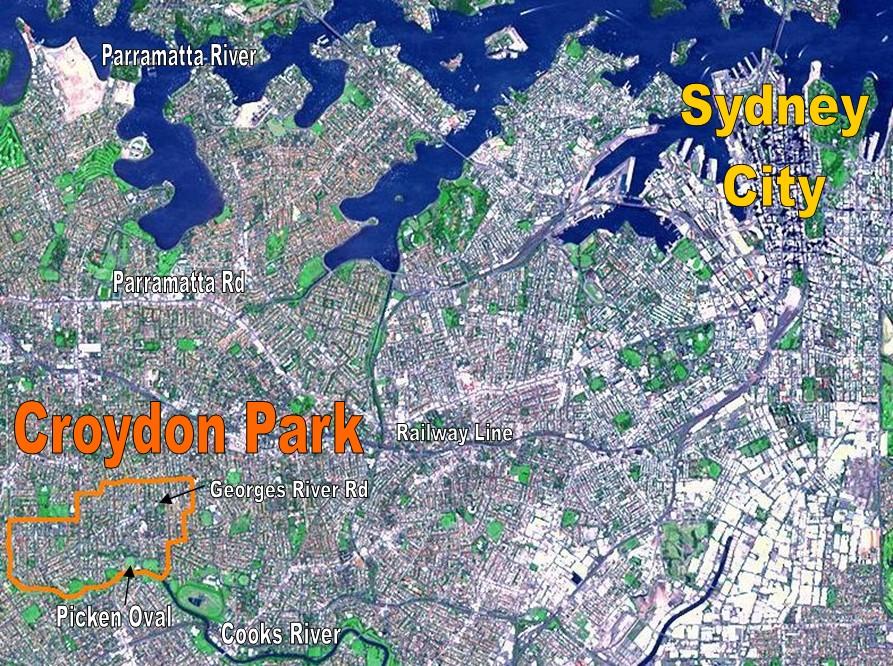
NASA image of Sydney's CBD and inner west suburbs, with borders of Croydon Park shown in orange

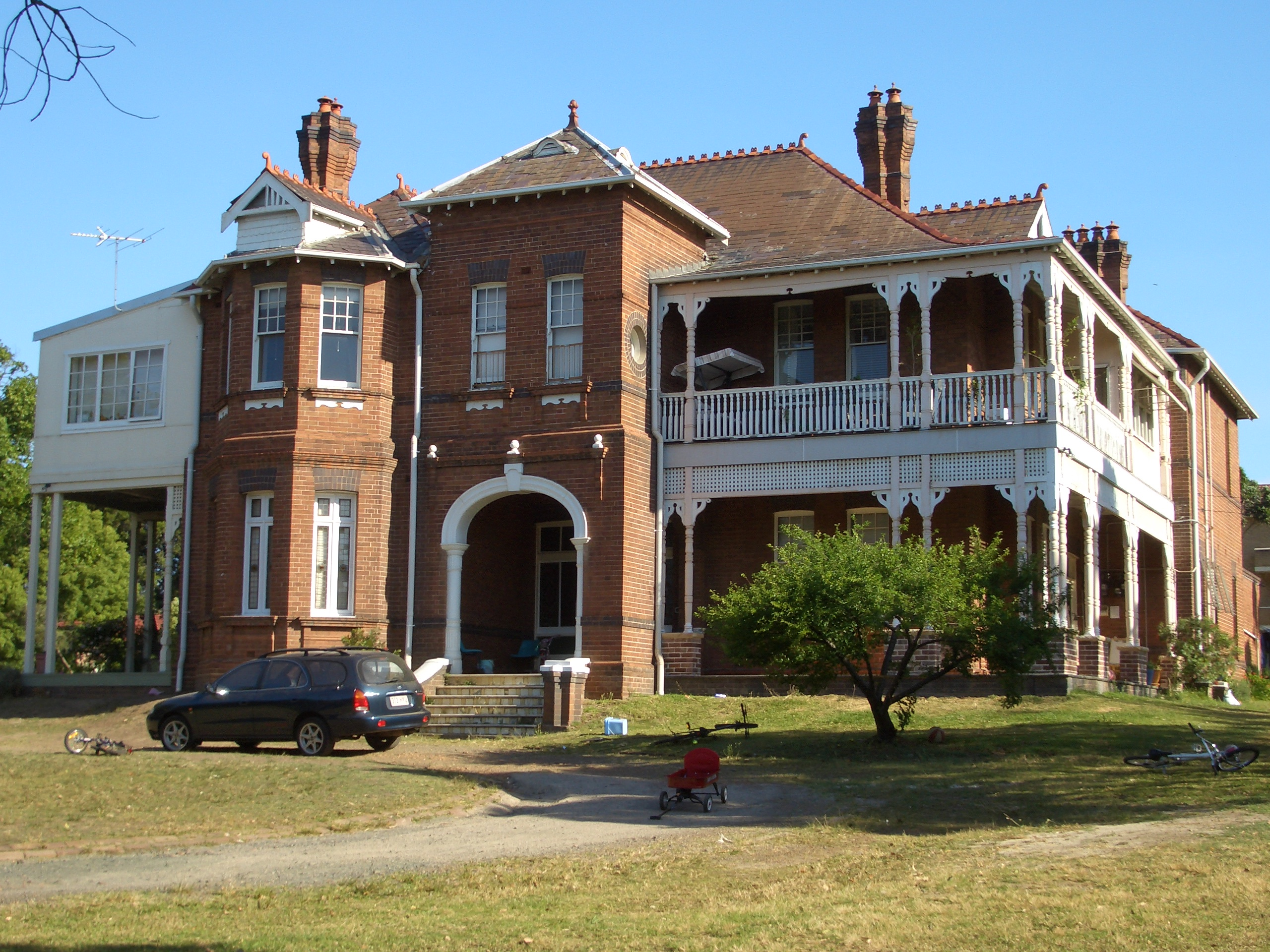
But-Har-Gra, Georges River Road. Gifted to the Church of England in 1934 by the Button Family, is now part of Moore Theological College

Croydon Park is a suburb in the Inner West of Sydney, in the state of New South Wales, Australia. Croydon Park is 12.1 kilometres south-west of the Sydney central business district and is divided between the local government areas of the City of Canterbury-Bankstown, Municipality of Burwood and Inner West Council. Croydon is a separate suburb, to the north.

Croydon Park has a commercial shopping strip along Georges River Road and is in proximity to larger shopping and town centres of Burwood, Ashfield and Campsie. Croydon Park is relatively large compared to neighbouring suburbs. It is largely residential, but has a commercial strip along Georges River Road, a local arterial that runs through the centre of the suburb.

== History ==
Croydon Park was originally part of the territory of the Darug tribe which occupied much of Sydney. More specifically, it was probably home to the Wangal clan (based around Concord) but may also have been home to the Cadigal (Sydney) or Bideagal (Botany Bay) clans. There were middens along the Cooks River where the indigenous people camped. These were destroyed by early British settlers to make lime for mortar in buildings.

A portion of the former Brighton Farm located between Georges River Road and the Cooks River was purchased by Henry Parkes and was subdivided and sold by auction at the Temperance Hall, Pitt Street on Saturday, 29 September 1877. Henry Parkes renamed this subdivision as Croydon Park to differentiate it from the larger suburb of Croydon to the north.

In 1878 and 1880, following the building of a railway station at Croydon to the north, two large subdivisions of land were undertaken using the name Croydon Park. These constituted the entire area of the current suburb. A piece of flood-prone land at the junction of Croydon Avenue and the Cooks River was reserved as a public park. Given the name Croydon Park, it was the first reserve in the City of Canterbury. Early settlers included many people involved in the building trade and Chinese market gardeners.

A primary school was established in 1886 to cater for the increasing number of children in the area. Mains water was connected in 1889 and sewerage in the 1910s. The Parents and Citizens Association at the public school believed that residents were rather left out of regular postal deliveries and a petition was prepared for their member of parliament asking for a Croydon Park post office to be opened in the area. They were successful in 1914 and the surrounding neighbourhood became a separate suburb.

Circa 1890, the mansion But-har-gra (formerly Mandama) was built on Georges River Road. A substantial two-storey house of brick, it combines Italianate and Federation elements. Gifted to the Church of England in 1934 by the Button Family, it is currently used as residential accommodation for students of Moore Theological College and is heritage-listed.

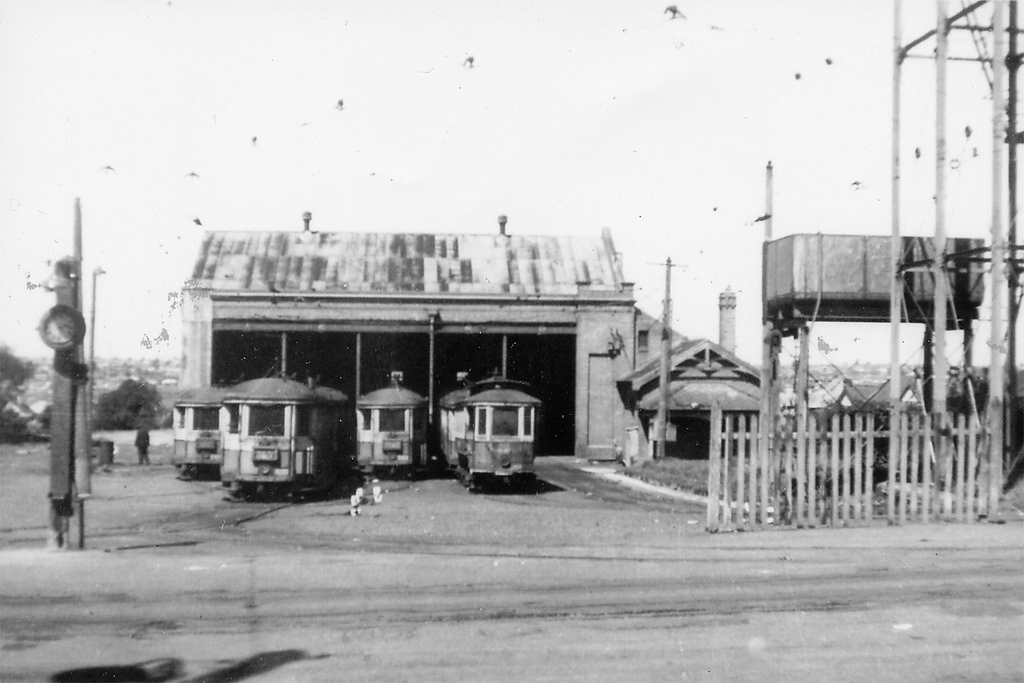
Tram depot in Tangarra Street, in the late 1940s

Between 1891 and 1948, Croydon Park was served by a tram line centred around a depot in Tangarra Street. The line began as a steam tramway, opened in 1891, between Ashfield Station and Enfield. In 1901, this line was extended north via Liverpool Road and Burwood Road through Burwood to Mortlake, and in 1909 a branch to Cabarita Park was opened. The system was electrified in 1912. The line was never connected to any of the other tram lines in Sydney, although its eastern terminus, at Ashfield station, was only one station away (on the main suburban railway line) from the nearest tram terminus at Summer Hill station.

== Commercial area ==
Croydon Park has a commercial strip along Georges River Road, which cuts through the centre of the suburb, as well as some other commercial enterprises in other parts of the suburb. The Enfield branch of Flower Power Garden Centre, and a Whole Farms Market produce store, are also located in Croydon Park.

== Transport ==
The suburb is well serviced by buses to neighbouring stations at Ashfield, Campsie and Burwood

- 413 is the most significant service connecting to both the Sydney CBD and Campsie.
- 420 is a major orbital bus route travelling from Westfield Burwood to Mascot railway station via Croydon Park, Campsie, Rockdale and Sydney Airport.
- 464 Ashfield to Mortlake via Croydon Park and Burwood
- 490 Drummoyne to Hurstville via Burwood, Croydon Park and Campsie
- 492 Drummoyne to Rockdale via Burwood, Croydon Park and Campsie
- 410 Hurstville to Macquarie Park via Croydon Park and Burwood

There is also a cycleway along the Cooks River connecting Olympic Park at Homebush with Botany Bay.

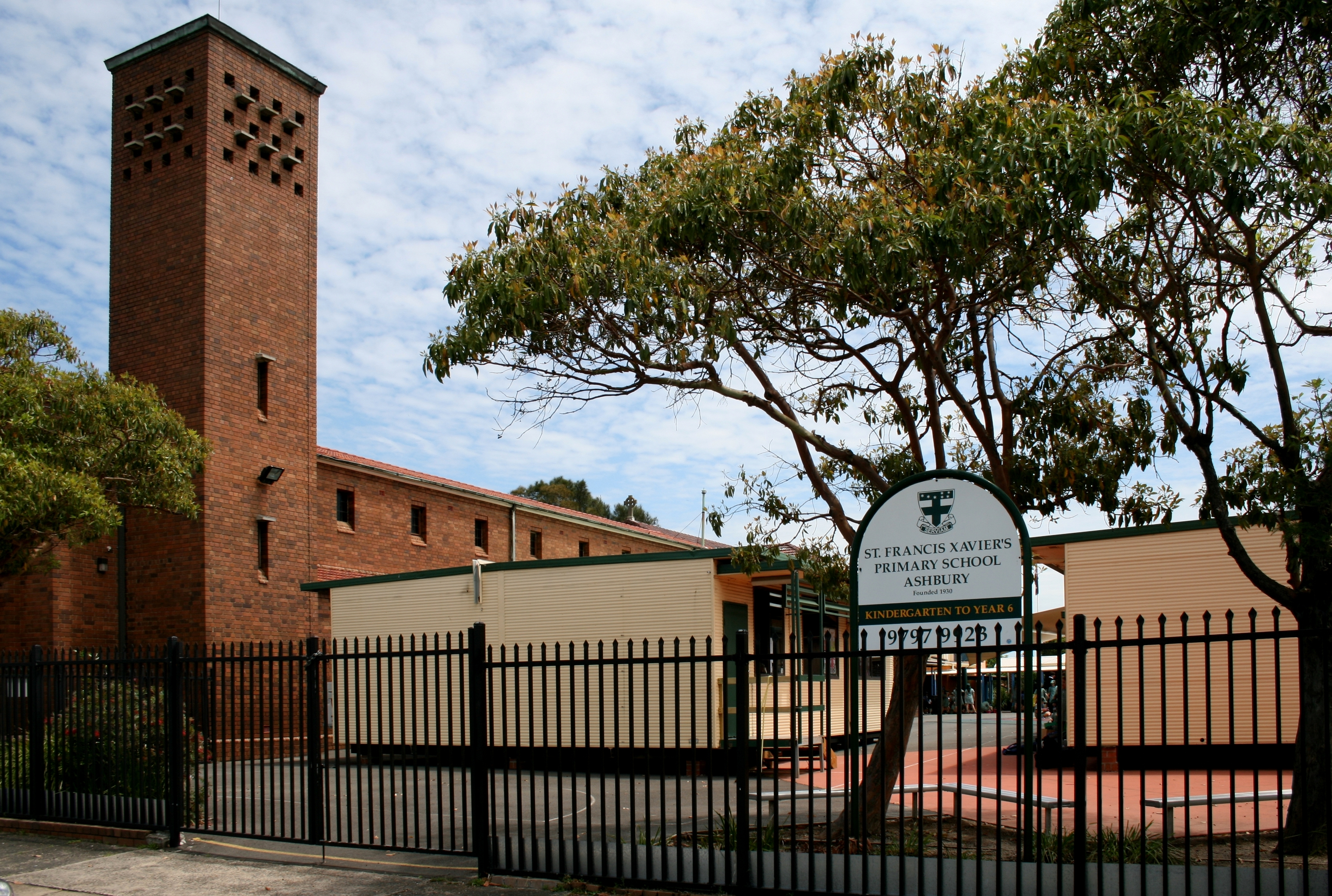
St. Francis Xavier's Catholic Primary School (with the church tower on the left).

== Schools ==
There are two primary schools in Croydon Park: Croydon Park Public School and St Francis Xavier's Catholic School. Croydon Park Public School was founded in 1884.

== Parks ==
Croydon Park, commonly mistaken for Croydon, boasts numerous parks and parklands, particularly close to the Cooks River. Picken Oval is home to the Western Suburbs Magpies Australian Rules team. Lees Park is a homeground of Canterbury Junior Soccer Association and tennis courts. Other parks and reserves include Flockhart Park, Jackson Park, Rosedale Reserve and Croydon Park.

== Demographics ==
According to the 2021 census, Croydon Park had a population of 10,929, down slightly from the 11,012 recorded in the 2016 census. In Croydon Park, 58.9% of people were born in Australia. The most common other countries of birth outside Australia were China 6.0%, Italy 4.3%, Lebanon 3.3%, New Zealand 1.6% and India 1.5%. The most common ancestries were Australian 17.2%, Italian 17.2%, English 14.6%, Chinese 13.7% and Lebanese 8.7%. 52.3% of residents spoke a language other than English at home, with the top languages being Italian 7.1%, Arabic 6.8%, Mandarin 6.0%, Cantonese 4.3% and Greek 3.3%. The most common responses for religion in Croydon Park in the 2016 Census were Catholic 39.3%, No Religion 24.6%, Eastern Orthodox 6.7%, Anglican 6.6% and Not stated 4.6%.

== Notable residents ==
- Frederick Frost (1891–1971): twice awarded the Distinguished Conduct Medal during World War I.
- Clifford Hay (1878–1949): chief public servant to seven NSW premiers starting with William Holman in 1916.
- Brett Holman (1984–): international soccer player who grew up in Croydon Park.
- Jack Mundey (1929–2020): union and environmental activist.
- Edward Pierson Ramsay (1842–1916): curator of the Australian Museum from 1874 to 1894.
- Grahame Thomas (1938–): Test cricketer.
- Nikki Webster (1987–): Pop singer and performer at the 2000 Sydney Olympics opening ceremony.
- Barbara Holborow (1930–2012): NSW Children's Court magistrate. Advocate for children's rights.

== Politics ==
Croydon Park is divided between three local government areas and as a result is frequently divided between different state and federal electorates as well. Between the 2010 and 2025 federal elections, it was wholly within the division of Watson. Since the 2025 election, it has been in the division of Grayndler, represented by the Prime Minister, Anthony Albanese. The whole suburb sits within the state electoral district of Strathfield, represented by Jason Yat-Sen Li since 2022.

Voting in Croydon Park since 2000
Elections	Fed01	NSW03	Fed04	NSW07	Fed07	Fed10	NSW11	Fed13	NSW15	NSW19	Fed19	Fed22	NSW23
Two Party Preferred Results
Labor	56%	nr	56%	68%	61%	55%	43%	57%	52%	55%	64%	65%	63%
Liberal	44%	nr	44%	32%	39%	45%	57%	43%	48%	45%	36%	35%	37%
First Preference Results
Labor	48%	53%	44%	55%	53%	44%	34%	40%	41%	44%	52%	52%	52%
Liberal	40%	30%	40%	28%	35%	41%	48%	46%	38%	39%	29%	27%	33%
Greens	4%	9%	10%	8%	8%	12%	10%	8%	9%	9%	7%	10%	9%
Christian Democrats	nc	nc	1%	4%	4%	nc	2%	2%	4%	nc	5%	nc	nc
