= 2022 Strathfield state by-election =

- 12 February 2022

Electoral district of Strathfield in the New South Wales Legislative Assembly
- Registered: 55,220
- Turnout: 80.82% (▼8.22)

| | First party | Second party |
|---|---|---|
| Candidate | Jason Yat-Sen Li | Bridget Sakr |
| Party | Labor | Liberal |
| Primary vote | 18,034 | 15,921 |
| Percentage | 41.05% | 36.24% |
| Swing | ▼3.25 | ▼2.64 |
| TCP | 55.81% | 44.19% |
| TCP change | ▲0.81 | ▼0.81 |
MP before election
Jodi McKay
Labor
Elected MP
Jason Yat-Sen Li
Labor

A by-election was held in the New South Wales Legislative Assembly seat of Strathfield on 12 February 2022, following the resignation of former leader of the Labor Party Jodi McKay.

It was held on the same day as by-elections for the districts of Bega, Monaro and Willoughby. The writs for election were issued on 21 January 2022. Nominations for candidates closed seven days later at noon on 27 January, with the ballot paper draw commencing in the morning of 28 January.

The NSW Electoral Commission pre-emptively sent postal ballots to all voters registered on the state electoral roll, under a regulation in a COVID amendment to the Electoral Act. Postal votes were checked against in-person voting rolls to prevent double voting. The iVote online voting system was not used at these elections after the system failed during the NSW local government elections in December 2021.

== Candidates ==
Candidates are listed in the order they appeared on the ballot.

| Party | Candidate | Background |
|---|---|---|
| Sustainable Australia | Ellie Robertson | Executive Board Member for the Australian Local Government Women’s Association |
| Labor | Jason Yat-Sen Li | Unity Party candidate for the NSW Senate in 1998, Labor candidate for Bennelong at the 2013 federal election, a Labor candidate for the NSW Senate in 2019 |
| Independent | Elizabeth Farrelly | Former City of Sydney councillor |
| Animal Justice | Rohan Laxmanalal | Professional background in finance |
| Greens | Courtney Buckley | Photographer |
| Liberal | Bridget Sakr | Co-founder of Granite Home Loans |

== Campaign ==
One of the major issues of the campaign is the impacts of COVID-19 on business and the lives of the constituents and the perceptions of Dominic Perrottet handling of the virus. Other issues include challenges of overdevelopment and the number of high rise towers in the area. Li has said that in theory he is not opposed to considering Chinese investment if the right opportunity came about.

There was criticism from the chair of the Ethnic Communities' Council of NSW Peter Doukas that the voting packs that were sent out to voters was not sent out in multiple languages. Strathfield has one of the highest proportions of non-English speakers, and the fear is that this could increase the rate of informal voting.

Most of the votes were postal, counted a week later on 19 February 2022.

== Results ==
2022 Strathfield state by-election
| Party | Candidate | Votes | % | ±% |
|---|---|---|---|---|
| Labor | Jason Yat-Sen Li | 18,034 | 41.05 | −3.25 |
| Liberal | Bridget Sakr | 15,921 | 36.24 | −2.64 |
| Independent | Elizabeth Farrelly | 4,328 | 9.85 | +9.85 |
| Greens | Courtney Buckley | 2,930 | 6.67 | −2.12 |
| Sustainable Australia | Ellie Robertson | 1,795 | 4.09 | +4.09 |
| Animal Justice | Rohan Laxmanalal | 920 | 2.09 | −0.13 |
| Total formal votes | | 43,928 | 98.42 | +1.44 |
| Informal votes | | 703 | 1.58 | −1.44 |
| Turnout | | 44,631 | 80.82 | −8.22 |
Two-party-preferred result
| Labor | Jason Yat-Sen Li | 21,670 | 55.81 | +0.81 |
| Liberal | Bridget Sakr | 17,160 | 44.19 | −0.81 |
| Labor hold | | Swing | +0.81 | |

== See also ==
- Electoral results for the district of Strathfield
- List of New South Wales state by-elections
