= Candidates of the 2019 New South Wales state election =

This is a list of the candidates of the 2019 New South Wales state election, held on 23 March 2019.

568 candidates nominated for the Legislative Assembly, while 346 nominated for the Legislative Council.

== Retiring MPs ==
The seat of Wollondilly was vacant following the resignation of Liberal MP Jai Rowell on 17 December 2018.

Members who chose not to renominate for the 2019 election are as follows:

=== Labor ===
- Luke Foley MP (Auburn) – announced 9 November 2018
- Ernest Wong MLC – lost preselection 12 June 2018

=== Liberal ===
- Greg Aplin MP (Albury) – announced 1 August 2018
- Glenn Brookes MP (East Hills) – announced 4 August 2018
- Pru Goward MP (Goulburn) – announced 19 December 2018
- Chris Patterson MP (Camden) – announced 28 September 2018
- David Clarke MLC – announced retirement September 2018
- Scot MacDonald MLC – announced 12 November 2018

=== Nationals ===
- Andrew Fraser MP (Coffs Harbour) – announced 14 June 2018
- Thomas George MP (Lismore) – announced 30 June 2017
- Troy Grant MP (Dubbo) – announced 12 July 2018
- Kevin Humphries MP (Barwon) – announced 1 June 2017
- Rick Colless MLC – did not renominate

=== Shooters, Fishers and Farmers ===
- Robert Brown MLC – lost preselection 5 February 2019

== Legislative Assembly ==
Sitting members are shown in bold text. Successful candidates are highlighted in the relevant colour. Where there is possible confusion, an asterisk (*) is also used.

Electorate	Held by	Labor candidate	Coalition candidate	Greens candidate	Other candidates
Albury	Liberal	Lauriston Muirhead	Justin Clancy (Lib)	Dean Moss	Ross Hamilton (Sus); Reuben McNair (KSO)
Auburn	Labor	Lynda Voltz	Christina Kang (Lib)	Janet Castle	Luke Ahern (Ind); Kieron Lee (KSO)
Ballina	Greens	Asren Pugh	Ben Franklin (Nat)	**Tamara Smith**	Cathy Blasonato (AJP); Lisa McDermott (Sus); James Wright (KSO)
Balmain	Greens	Elly Howse	Wenjie (Ben) Zhang (Lib)	**Jamie Parker**	Angela Dunnett (Sus); Anita Finlayson (AJP); Amilia Leonetti (KSO); Clementine Rogers (Ind)
Bankstown	Labor	**Tania Mihailuk**	George Zakhia (Lib)	James Rooney	Saud Abu-Samen (Ind)
Barwon	National	Darriea Turley	Andrew Schier (Nat)	Leigh Williams	Jason Alan (AJP); Roy Butler* (SFFP); Andrew Fleisher (LDP); Maree McDonald-Pritchard (Sus); Phil Naden (Ind); Owen Whyman (Ind)
Bathurst	National	Beau Riley	**Paul Toole** (Nat)	David Harvey	Michael Begg (Sus); Timothy Hansen (KSO); Brenden May (SFFP); Cordova Olivos (Ind)
Baulkham Hills	Liberal	Ryan Tracey	**David Elliott** (Lib)	Erica Hockley	Heather Boyd (Sus); Craig Hall (CDP); Linda Newfield (AJP)
Bega	Liberal	Leanne Atkinson	**Andrew Constance** (Lib)	Will Douglas	Coral Anderson (AJP); Joshua Shoobridge (AC); Eric Thomas (SFFP)
Blacktown	Labor	**Stephen Bali**	Allan Green (Lib)	Kirsten Gibbs	Amit Batish (PHON); Josh Green (CDP)
Blue Mountains	Labor	**Trish Doyle**	Owen Laffin (Lib)	Kingsley Liu	Gregory Keightly (AJP); Richard Marschall (Sus); Cameron Phillips (CDP); Mark Pigott (KSO)
Cabramatta	Labor	**Nick Lalich**	Austin Le (Lib)	Christopher James	Dai Le (Ind); Phuoc Vo (Ind)
Camden	Liberal	Sally Quinnell	Peter Sidgreaves (Lib)	Karen Stewart	Daniel Aragona (KSO); Ben Casey (PHON); Danica Sajn (Sus); Andrew Simpson (Ind)
Campbelltown	Labor	**Greg Warren**	Riley Munro (Lib)	Jayden Rivera	James Gent (CDP)
Canterbury	Labor	**Sophie Cotsis**	Matt Harrison (Lib)	Linda Eisler	Fatima Figueira (CDP)
Castle Hill	Liberal	David Ager	**Ray Williams** (Lib)	David Field	Herman Kuipers (Sus)
Cessnock	Labor	**Clayton Barr**	Josh Angus (Nat)	Janet Murray	Chris Parker (AJP); Steve Russell (Sus)
Charlestown	Labor	**Jodie Harrison**	Jennifer Barrie (Lib)	Therese Doyle	Richard Turner (AJP)
Clarence	National	Trent Gilbert	**Chris Gulaptis** (Nat)	Gregory Clancy	Steve Cansdell (SFFP); Thom Kotis (Sus); Debrah Novak (Ind)
Coffs Harbour	National	Tony Judge	Gurmesh Singh (Nat)	Jonathan Cassell	Stuart Davidson (SFFP); Ann Leonard (Ind); Robyn Marchant (AJP); Gregory Renet (LDP); Sally Townley (Ind)
Coogee	Liberal	Marjorie O'Neill	**Bruce Notley-Smith** (Lib)	Lindsay Shurey	Simon Garrod (AJP); Lluisa Murray (Sus); Ciaran O'Brien (SBP); Joseph O'Donohue (KSO); Josh Turnbull (SFFP)
Cootamundra	National	Mark Douglass	**Steph Cooke** (Nat)	Jeff Passlow	Joseph Costello (Sus); Jim Saleam (Ind); Matthew Stadtmiller (SFFP)
Cronulla	Liberal	Teressa Farhart	**Mark Speakman** (Lib)	Jon Doig	Phillip Burriel (KSO); Richard Moran (Sus)
Davidson	Liberal	Joe Von Bornemann	**Jonathan O'Dea** (Lib)	Felicity Davis	Stephen Molloy (Sus); Jacob Shteyman (KSO)
Drummoyne	Liberal	Tom Hore	**John Sidoti** (Lib)	Charles Jago	David Roberts (KSO); Maurice Saidi (AJP)
Dubbo	National	Stephen Lawrence	Dugald Saunders (Nat)	Rod Pryor	Joanne Cotterill (Flux); Mathew Dickerson (Ind); Lara Quealy (SFFP); April Salter (AC)
East Hills	Liberal	Cameron Murphy	Wendy Lindsay (Lib)	Sue Virago	Heather Barnes (AJP); Chris Brogan (Ind); Owen Butt (CDP); Lisa Maddock (KSO)
Epping	Liberal	Alan Mascarenhas	**Dominic Perrottet** (Lib)	Simon Margan	Samuel Lyndon (KSO); Victor Waterson (Ind)
Fairfield	Labor	**Guy Zangari**	Sam Youkhana (Lib)	Astrid O'Neill	Sam Georgis (CDP)
Gosford	Labor	**Liesl Tesch**	Sue Dengate (Lib)	Hillary Morris	Larry Freeman (SFFP); Patrick Murphy (AJP); Judy Singer (Sus)
Goulburn	Liberal	Ursula Stephens	Wendy Tuckerman (Lib)	Saan Ecker	Tracey Keenan (AJP); Dean McCrae (LDP); Richard Orchard (PHON); Andy Wood (SFFP)
Granville	Labor	**Julia Finn**	Tony Issa (Lib)	Ben Prociv	Abdul Charaf (Ind); Linda Harris (Ind); Rohan Laxmanalal (AJP); Steven Lopez (Ind); Keith Piper (CDP)
Hawkesbury	Liberal	Peter Reynolds	Robyn Preston (Lib)	Danielle Wheeler	Marie-Jeanne Bowyer (Ind); Elissa Carrey (Sus); Sarah Coogans (AJP); Perran Costi (KSO); Shane Djuric (SFFP); Eddie Dogramaci (Ind)
Heathcote	Liberal	Maryanne Stuart	**Lee Evans** (Lib)	Mitch Shakespeare	James Aspey (AJP); Joel McManus (SFFP)
Heffron	Labor	**Ron Hoenig**	Alexander Andruska (Lib)	Kym Chapple	Michael Dello-Iacovo (AJP); Chris Ryan (KSO)
Holsworthy	Liberal	Charishma Kaliyanda	**Melanie Gibbons** (Lib)	Chris Kerle	Roland Barber (LDP); Michael Byrne (PHON); Gae Constable (AJP)
Hornsby	Liberal	Katie Gompertz	**Matt Kean** (Lib)	Joe Nicita	Isaac Andrew (AC); Emma Eros (PHON); Mick Gallagher (Ind); Hayden Gray (KSO); John Murray (Ind); Justin Thomas (Sus)
Keira	Labor	**Ryan Park**	Chris Atlee (Lib)	Kaye Osborn	John Gill (Sus)
Kiama	Liberal	Andy Higgins	**Gareth Ward** (Lib)	Nina Digiglio	John Kadwell (CDP); Anne Whatman (Sus)
Kogarah	Labor	**Chris Minns**	Scott Yung (Lib)	Greta Werner	Phillip Pollard (PHON); Natalie Resman (KSO)
Ku-ring-gai	Liberal	Amanda Keeling	**Alister Henskens** (Lib)	Qiu Yue (Viki) Zhang	Liam Blood (KSO); Mitchell Strahan (LDP)
Lake Macquarie	Independent	Jo Smith	Lindsay Paterson (Lib)	Kim Grierson	**Greg Piper*** (Ind); Marie Rolfe (Sus); Laurance Taranto (AJP)
Lakemba	Labor	**Jihad Dib**	Rashid Bhuiyan (Lib)	Emmet de Bhaldraithe	Dorlene Abou-Haidar (AJP); Omar Najjar (KSO); Karl Schubert (CDP)
Lane Cove	Liberal	Andrew Zbik	**Anthony Roberts** (Lib)	Pierre Masse	Murray Fleming (Sus); Richard Quinn (Ind); Joanne Spiteri (KSO)
Lismore	National	Janelle Saffin	Austin Curtin (Nat)	Sue Higginson	Greg Bennett (Ind); Paul Collits (AC); David Taylor (Sus); Alison Waters (AJP)
Liverpool	Labor	**Paul Lynch**	Paul Zadro (Lib)	Signe Westerberg	Michael Andjelkovic (Ind); Ravneel Chand (KSO); Adam Novek (AC)
Londonderry	Labor	**Prue Car**	Belinda Hill (Lib)	Charlie Pierce	David Bowen (Sus); Donald Modarelli (CDP)
Macquarie Fields	Labor	**Anoulack Chanthivong**	Zahurul Quazi (Lib)	Stephen Eagar-Deitz	Syed Ahmed (Ind); Mick Allen (Ind); Scott Singh (KSO)
Maitland	Labor	**Jenny Aitchison**	Sally Halliday (Lib)	John Brown	Sam Ferguson (Sus); Amy Johnson (AJP); James Lawson (KSO); Nadrra Sarkis (SFFP); Neil Turner (PHON)
Manly	Liberal	Natasha Phillips-Mason	**James Griffin** (Lib)	Kristyn Glanville	Dane Murray (KSO); Emanuel Paletto (Sus); Kate Paterson (AJP)
Maroubra	Labor	**Michael Daley**	Pat Farmer (Lib)	James Cruz	Petra Campbell (Sus); Noel D'Souza (Ind); Rowan Kos (KSO); Caroline Simons (AC)
Miranda	Liberal	Jen Armstrong	**Eleni Petinos** (Lib)	Nathan Hunt	Gaye Cameron (PHON); George Capsis (CDP); Nick Hughes (Sus)
Monaro	National	Bryce Wilson	**John Barilaro** (Nat)	Peter Marshall	Mick Holton (SFFP); Frankie Seymour (AJP); Andrew Thaler (Ind)
Mount Druitt	Labor	**Edmond Atalla**	Mark Rusev (Lib)	Brent Robertson	Samraat Grewal (CDP); George Lang (AC)
Mulgoa	Liberal	Todd Carney	**Tanya Davies** (Lib)	Rob Shield	Jessie Bijok (Sus)
Murray	National	Alan Purtill	**Austin Evans** (Nat)	Nivanka De Silva	Helen Dalton* (SFFP); Liam Davies (KSO); Carl Kendall (Sus); David Landini (Ind); Philip Langfield (CDP); Brian Mills (Ind); Tom Weyrich (PHON)
Myall Lakes	National	David Keegan	**Stephen Bromhead** (Nat)	Ellie Spence	Quentin Bye (Sus); Heather Elliott (SFFP); Paul Sandilands (Ind)
Newcastle	Labor	**Tim Crakanthorp**	Blake Keating (Lib)	Charlotte McCabe	Sean Bremner Young (AJP); Glen Fredericks (SBP); Beverley Jelfs (Sus); Claudia Looker (KSO); Steve O'Brien (SA)
Newtown	Greens	Norma Ingram	Rohan Indraghanti (Lib)	**Jenny Leong**	Michelle Buckmaster (AJP); Aaron Le Saux (SBP); Hugh Watson (Sus); Laura White (KSO)
North Shore	Liberal	Michael Lester	**Felicity Wilson** (Lib)	Toby Pettigrew	Victoria Boast (Sus); Olivia Bouchier (AJP); Carolyn Corrigan (Ind); Jeffrey Grimshaw (AC); Sam Gunning (LDP)
Northern Tablelands	National	Debra O'Brien	**Adam Marshall** (Nat)	Dorothy Robinson	Rayne Single (SFFP)
Oatley	Liberal	Lucy Mannering	**Mark Coure** (Lib)	Gianluca Dragone	Raphael Bongomin (SFFP); Mark Preston (PHON)
Orange	Shooters	Luke Sanger	Kate Hazelton (Nat)	Stephen Nugent	Terri Baxter (Ind); Stephen Bisgrove (LDP); Maurice Davey (CDP); **Philip Donato*** (SFFP); Garry McMahon (AC); David O'Brien (KSO)
Oxley	National	Susan Jenvey	**Melinda Pavey** (Nat)	Arthur Bain	Dean Saul (SFFP); Debbie Smythe (Sus)
Parramatta	Liberal	Liz Scully	**Geoff Lee** (Lib)	Phil Bradley	Samuel Bellwood (KSO); Michelle Garrard (Ind); Jasmina Moltter (Sus); Susan Price (SA)
Penrith	Liberal	Karen McKeown	**Stuart Ayres** (Lib)	Nick Best	Jim Aitken (Ind); Geoff Brown (Sus); David Burton (CDP); Marcus Cornish (Ind); Rod Franich (SFFP); Carl Halley (PHON); Kaj McBeth (AJP); Gabrielle McIntosh (Ind); Mark Tyndall (Ind)
Pittwater	Liberal	Jared Turkington	**Rob Stokes** (Lib)	Miranda Korzy	Suzanne Daly (Sus); Natalie Matkovic (AJP); Stewart Matthews (Ind); Stacey Mitchell (AC); Michael Newman (KSO)
Port Macquarie	National	Peter Alley	**Leslie Williams** (Nat)	Drusi Megget	Jan Burgess (Sus)
Port Stephens	Labor	**Kate Washington**	Jaimie Abbott (Lib)	Maureen Magee	Bill Doran (Ind); Bradley Jelfs (Sus); Therese Taylor (AJP)
Prospect	Labor	**Hugh McDermott**	Matthew Hana (Lib)	Dot Newland	Milan Maksimovic (Ind); Catherine Ward (AJP)
Riverstone	Liberal	Annemarie Christie	**Kevin Conolly** (Lib)	Alex Van Vucht	
Rockdale	Labor	**Steve Kamper**	Samir Hassan (Lib)	Peter Strong	Paul Collaros (AJP); Hussein Faraj (Ind); George Tulloch (KSO)
Ryde	Liberal	Jerome Laxale	**Victor Dominello** (Lib)	Lindsay Peters	Steve Busch (AC); Christopher De Bruyne (LDP); Sophie Khatchigian (KSO); Mark Larsen (Sus); Julie Worsley (CDP)
Seven Hills	Liberal	Durga Owen	**Mark Taylor** (Lib)	Damien Atkins	Eric Claus (Sus); Jude D'Cruz (AC); Alan Sexton (Ind)
Shellharbour	Labor	**Anna Watson**	Shane Bitschkat (Lib)	Jamie Dixon	Ken Davis (Sus)
South Coast	Liberal	Annette Alldrick	**Shelley Hancock** (Lib)	Kim Stephenson	
Strathfield	Labor	**Jodi McKay**	Philip Madirazza (Lib)	Crisetta MacLeod	Simon Fletcher (AJP); Jack Liang (AC); Vinay Orekondy (KSO)
Summer Hill	Labor	**Jo Haylen**	Leo Wei (Lib)	Tom Raue	Andrea Markis (KSO); Teresa Romanovsky (AJP); Dale Sinden (Sus); Paul Wecker (Ind)
Swansea	Labor	**Yasmin Catley**	Dean Bowman (Lib)	Doug Williamson	Julia Riseley (AJP); Glenn Seddon (AC)
Sydney	Independent	Jo Holder	Lyndon Gannon (Lib)	Jonathan Harms	Fiona Douskou (SBP); **Alex Greenwich*** (Ind); Christopher Thomas (Sus)
Tamworth	National	Steve Mears	**Kevin Anderson** (Nat)	Robin Gunning	Jeff Bacon (SFFP); Emma Hall (AJP); Mark Rodda (Ind)
Terrigal	Liberal	Jeff Sundstrom	**Adam Crouch** (Lib)	Bob Doyle	Ross Blaikie (AC); Gary Chestnut (Ind); Flavia Coleman (AJP); Bradly Hardman (Ind); Wayne Rigg (Sus)
The Entrance	Labor	**David Mehan**	Brian Perrem (Lib)	Stephen Pearson	Hadden Ervin (AC); Jake Fitzpatrick (KSO); Margaret Jones (Sus); Maddy Richards (AJP)
Tweed	National	Craig Elliot	**Geoff Provest** (Nat)	Bill Fenelon	Susie Hearder (AJP); Ronald McDonald (Sus)
Upper Hunter	National	Melanie Dagg	**Michael Johnsen** (Nat)	Tony Lonergan	Calum Blair (Sus); Mark Ellis (LDP); Claire Robertson (AJP); Richard Stretton (CDP); Lee Watts (SFFP)
Vaucluse	Liberal	Lenore Kulakauskas	**Gabrielle Upton** (Lib)	Megan McEwin	Deb Doyle (AJP); Kay Dunne (Sus); Miriam Guttman-Jones (Ind); Mark Macsmith (KSO)
Wagga Wagga	Independent	Dan Hayes	Mackenna Powell (Nat)	Ray Goodlass	Seb McDonagh (SFFP); **Joe McGirr*** (Ind); Matt Quade (Ind); Colin Taggart (CON)
Wakehurst	Liberal	Chris Sharpe	**Brad Hazzard** (Lib)	Lilith Zaharias	Darren Hough (Ind); Katika Schultz (KSO); Susan Sorenson (AJP)
Wallsend	Labor	**Sonia Hornery**	Nick Trappett (Lib)	Sinead Francis-Coan	Fiona De Vries (AC); Toni Gundry (AJP)
Willoughby	Liberal	Justin Reiss	**Gladys Berejiklian** (Lib)	Daniel Keogh	Emma Bennett (AJP); Tom Crowley (KSO); Greg Graham (Sus); Meow-Ludo Meow-Meow (Flux); Larissa Penn (Ind)
Wollondilly	Liberal	Jo-Ann Davidson	Nathaniel Smith (Lib)	David Powell	Mitchell Black (LDP); Jason Bolwell (SFFP); Heather Edwards (AJP); Charlie Fenton (PHON); Judy Hannan (Ind)
Wollongong	Labor	**Paul Scully**	Zachary Fitzpatrick (Lib)	Benjamin Arcioni	Andrew Anthony (Sus); Benjamin Bank (AJP); James Hehir (KSO); Nikola Nastoski (Ind)
Wyong	Labor	**David Harris**	Ying Shu Li-Cantwell (Lib)	Sue Wynn	Martin Stevenson (AC)

== Legislative Council ==
Sitting members are shown in bold text. Tickets that elected at least one MLC are highlighted in the relevant colour. Successful candidates are identified by an asterisk (*).

Half of the Legislative Council was not up for re-election. This included seven Labor members (John Graham, Courtney Houssos, Shaoquett Moselmane, Adam Searle, Walt Secord, Mick Veitch and Lynda Voltz), six Liberal members (John Ajaka, Lou Amato, Scott Farlow, Don Harwin, Shayne Mallard and Matthew Mason-Cox), three Nationals members (Ben Franklin, Trevor Khan and Bronnie Taylor), two Greens members (Cate Faehrmann and Justin Field), one Christian Democrats member (Fred Nile), one Shooters and Fishers member (Robert Borsak) and one Animal Justice member (Mark Pearson). Voltz and Franklin resigned to run for the Legislative Assembly, so their seats were vacant.

The Labor Party was defending five seats. The Liberal-National Coalition was defending eleven seats. The Greens were defending three seats. The Christian Democratic Party and the Shooters and Fishers Party were each defending one seat.

Labor candidates	Coalition candidates	Greens candidates	One Nation candidates	SFFP candidates
1. Tara Moriarty*; 2. **Penny Sharpe***; 3. **Greg Donnelly***; 4. Anthony D'Adam*; 5. **Daniel Mookhey***; 6. **Peter Primrose***; 7. Mark Buttigieg*; 8. Julie Sibraa; 9. Michelle Miran; 10. Tri Vo; 11. Sally Sitou; 12. Charlie Sheahan; 13. Aruna Chandrala; 14. Paul Sekfy; 15. Peter Kim; 16. Sabrin Farooqui; 17. Sharon Sewell; 18. Vanessa Keenan; 19. Ann Martin; 20. Kim Weller; 21. Pamela Ward	1. **Catherine Cusack*** (Lib); 2. **Niall Blair*** (Nat); 3. Damien Tudehope* (Lib); 4. **Taylor Martin*** (Lib); 5. **Sarah Mitchell*** (Nat); 6. **Natalie Ward*** (Lib); 7. **Natasha Maclaren-Jones*** (Lib); 8. **Wes Fang*** (Nat); 9. **Peter Phelps** (Lib); 10. Alan Akhurst (Lib); 11. Steven de Gunst (Nat); 12. Pallavi Sinha (Lib); 13. Pat Daley (Lib); 14. Amy Lee (Lib); 15. John Chanter (Nat)	1. **David Shoebridge***; 2. Abigail Boyd*; 3. **Dawn Walker**; 4. Dominic Kanak; 5. Jane Scott; 6. Tom Kiat; 7. Monica Tan; 8. Tony Hickey; 9. Shaun Middlebrook; 10. Louise Ihlein; 11. Vicki Ross; 12. Philipa Veitch; 13. Tony Adams; 14. Louise Steer; 15. Rochelle Porteous; 16. Colin Hesse; 17. Roz Chia; 18. Lynne Saville; 19. Cath Blakey; 20. Adrian Jones; 21. Philippa Clark	1. Mark Latham*; 2. Rod Roberts*; 3. Mick Jackson; 4. Janet Kayes; 5. Jason Ross; 6. Bob Bourne; 7. Lynette Roberts; 8. Vicki Saker; 9. Adrian Saker; 10. Greville Bogard; 11. Peter Rees; 12. Cameron Roberts; 13. Damian Ottley; 14. Brian Olliver; 15. Quenten Roberts; 16. Margaret Cox; 17. John Cox	1. Mark Banasiak*; 2. Brett Cooke; 3. Holli Thomas; 4. Diane Cotroneo; 5. Alain Noujaim; 6. Raymond Mulligan; 7. Peter Richards; 8. Daniel Spears; 9. Benjamin Smith; 10. Kirsty Single; 11. Jason Lesage; 12. Jacqui Wood; 13. Howard Farrell; 14. Karen Romano; 15. Ray Hawkins; 16. John Howden; 17. Bob Shaw; 18. David Cook
AJP candidates	CDP candidates	Socialist Alliance candidates	Liberal Democrats candidates	Sustainable Australia candidates
1. Emma Hurst*; 2. Angela Pollard; 3. Gregory Pointing; 4. Petra Jones; 5. Leon Gross; 6. Karl Hosking; 7. Charlotte Ward; 8. Ian Underwood; 9. Kathleen Costello; 10. Bryan McGrath; 11. Benjamin Costello; 12. Jason Whalley; 13. Susanne Briggs; 14. David Atwell; 15. Temple Eyre; 16. Timothy Summerson; 17. Carol Bellenger; 18. Christopher Moses; 19. William Waters	1. **Paul Green**; 2. Aaron Wright; 3. Lara Taouk Sleiman; 4. Ross Clifford; 5. Luke Cubis; 6. Matthew Burton; 7. Beth Smith; 8. Graeme Young; 9. Kiah Oosterbeek; 10. Benjamin Mirza; 11. Helen Clarke; 12. Lesley Kadwell; 13. Tania Piper; 14. Peter Banks; 15. Michelle Green; 16. Anne Argaet; 17. Gregory Clarke; 18. Cecille Coan; 19. Charles Knox	1. Rachel Evans; 2. Peter Boyle; 3. Sam Ashby; 4. Andrew Chuter; 5. Paula Sanchez; 6. Phil Craig; 7. Pip Hinman; 8. Raul Bassi; 9. Margaret Gleeson; 10. Jim McIlroy; 11. Coral Wynter; 12. Zebedee Parkes; 13. Semra Coban; 14. Duncan Roden; 15. Topia Ryan-Jones; 16. Joel McAlear; 17. Nicole McGregor; 18. John Coleman	1. David Leyonhjelm; 2. Duncan Spender; 3. Codie Neville; 4. Andrew Hows; 5. Peter Runge; 6. Robert Nickols; 7. Charles Rios; 8. Joaquim De Lima; 9. Luke Zahra; 10. Clinton Mead; 11. Dax Love; 12. Charlie Chen; 13. Alan Bron; 14. James Klauzner; 15. James Pirie; 16. Samuel Duncan; 17. Keith Francis	1. William Bourke; 2. Alexander Kreet; 3. Xiaowei Yue; 4. Ann Burke; 5. Torsten Landwehr; 6. Jenny Goldie; 7. Wing In (Catherine) Lui; 8. Bradd Morelli; 9. Alison Noonan; 10. Warren Grzic; 11. Chris O'Rourke; 12. John Alden; 13. Ashley Brunner; 14. Mike Cottee; 15. Kerry Waight; 16. Peter Reid; 17. Jill Green; 18. Michael Wilder; 19. Anthea Kerrison; 20. Alan Magnusson; 21. Dean Winter
Advance candidates	Flux candidates	Conservatives candidates	Keep Sydney Open candidates	VEP candidates
1. Raymond Brown; 2. Ian Chandler; 3. Trisha Clements; 4. Kevin Cranfield; 5. Luke Van Jour; 6. Trina Rowston; 7. Geoffrey Craig; 8. Simon Costigan; 9. Eva Emrich; 10. Joel Marchant; 11. Michael O'Donnell; 12. Leslea Brown; 13. Benjamin Carruthers; 14. David Walter; 15. Helen Boland	1. Max Kaye; 2. Ben Rushton; 3. Jason Gavriel; 4. Mansour Soltani; 5. Shane Greenup; 6. Kipling Crossing; 7. Ben Ballingall; 8. Jessica Payne; 9. Liam Jarvis; 10. Adam Ross-Hopkins; 11. Thomas Sesselmann; 12. Jesse Hanna; 13. Christopher May; 14. Jordon Dearing; 15. Adrian Guerrera	1. Greg Walsh; 2. Ben Irawan; 3. Colin Grigg; 4. Robert Elliott; 5. Sonia Hibbert; 6. Tim Cairns; 7. Eric Lee; 8. Aaron Binns; 9. Daniel De Vries; 10. Samantha Samrani; 11. Sally-Anne Vincent; 12. Igor Palmer; 13. Cheryl Sardar; 14. Miguel Ribeiro; 15. Hengki Widjaja; 16. Allan Vincent; 17. Lachlan McLean	1. Tyson Koh; 2. Jess Miller; 3. Jesse Matheson; 4. Daniel McNamee; 5. Tori Levett; 6. Wendell French; 7. Emily Nicol; 8. Stavros Yiannoukas; 9. Max Becker; 10. Jordan Smith; 11. Allison Sims; 12. Bianca Esteban; 13. Stephan Gyory; 14. Eoin Maher; 15. Matthew White; 16. Hugo Ferrer; 17. James Heathwood; 18. Katie Green; 19. Wei Thai-Haynes; 20. Louisa Parmeter; 21. Brian Walker-Catchpole	1. Shayne Higson; 2. Luke Ditchfield; 3. Penelope Hackett; 4. Julie Hanley; 5. David Newman; 6. Jessica Edwards; 7. David Pieper; 8. Jan Edwards; 9. Sharon Potocnik; 10. Bill Winning; 11. Jo Langham; 12. Brian Beaumont Owles; 13. Kym Kilpatrick; 14. Judith Daley; 15. Sandi Steep; 16. Kath Schilling
Small Business candidates	Group G candidates	Group H candidates	Group L candidates	Group S candidates
1. Angela Vithoulkas; 2. John Gereige; 3. Dianne Coleman; 4. Gary Adamson; 5. Harrison Finch; 6. Paula Wynyard; 7. Hoai Nguyen; 8. Helen Preketes; 9. James Tsolakis; 10. Constentine Vithoulkas; 11. Julia Campbell; 12. Jillian Pamplin; 13. Brett Nickisson; 14. Rhaad Fogarty; 15. Todd Matthews; 16. Tony Stevis; 17. Tatiana Coulter; 18. Frank Douskou	1. Chris Osborne; 2. Warwick Stacey; 3. Ikaros Kyriacou; 4. Helen Ducker; 5. Kyriakos Koliadis; 6. Margaret Chaffey; 7. Paul Gerantonis; 8. Steven Campbell; 9. Frank Fitzpatrick; 10. John Tzemopoulos; 11. Christine Patrech; 12. Andrew Demas; 13. Neil Smith; 14. Nick Agnew; 15. Mark Osborne; 16. John Snell	1. Anthony Monaghan; 2. Sharni Monaghan	1. **Jeremy Buckingham**; 2. David Quince; 3. Jane Macallister; 4. John Watts; 5. Michele McKenzie; 6. Melinda Wilson; 7. Janelle Baylis; 8. Pete Wills; 9. Craig Shaw; 10. Chris Winslow; 11. Antony Lewis; 12. Mark Hutton; 13. Lorraine Beck; 14. Eve-Lyn Kennedy; 15. Patrick Darley-Jones	1. James Jansson; 2. Andrea Leong; 3. Eve Slavich; 4. Brendan Clarke; 5. Liviu Constantinescu; 6. Saritha Manickam; 7. Majella Morello; 8. James Oberg; 9. Michael Maroske; 10. Raymond Zeng; 11. Daniel Powell; 12. Markus Pfister; 13. Aaron Hammond; 14. Michael Wigham; 15. Robyn Finno; 16. Nathan Page; 17. Jay Christiaens
Ungrouped candidates
Tony Edwards; Ellie Robertson; John Brett; Ron Bogan; John Hunter; Bryn Hutchinson; Danny Lim; Andre Brokman
