= John Murphy (Australian politician, born 1950) =

Australian politician

The Honourable John Murphy
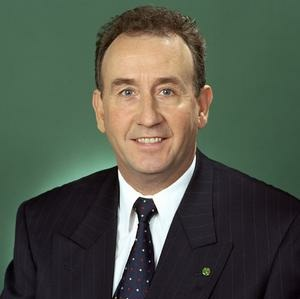
- John Murphy

Member of the Australian Parliament for Reid
- In office 21 August 2010 – 7 September 2013
- Preceded by: Laurie Ferguson
- Succeeded by: Craig Laundy

Member of the Australian Parliament for Lowe
- In office 3 October 1998 – 21 August 2010
- Preceded by: Paul Zammit
- Succeeded by: Division abolished

Personal details
- Born: 31 May 1950 (age 76) Dunedoo, New South Wales, Australia
- Party: Labor
- Spouse: Adriana
- Occupation: Public servant

John Paul Murphy (born 31 May 1950) is an Australian former politician who served as an Australian Labor Party member of the Australian House of Representatives from October 1998 until September 2013, representing Lowe and then Reid, New South Wales.

== Early life and education ==
John Murphy was born in Dunedoo, New South Wales. He was educated at Waverley College in NSW and worked with the Department of Veterans' Affairs for 20 years before moving to the Merit Protection Review Agency for eight years, including six years as Manager. Murphy served as a Councillor on Drummoyne Council (now part of Canada Bay Council) from 1995 to 1998.

== Political career ==
Murphy gained pre-selection for the ALP over the high-profile Michael Costello, former head of the Department of Foreign Affairs and Trade and Australian Stock Exchange, following protests by local ALP members who did not want Costello (who lived outside the electorate) being imposed on them.

Lowe's previous MP was Paul Zammit, a Liberal who turned Independent in protest over the Howard Government's policies on aircraft noise. Standing as an independent in the 1998 election, Zammit's preferences flowed to Murphy to help him win the seat for Labor. Murphy retained his seat at every subsequent election until 2013.

Murphy was the Parliamentary Secretary to the Shadow Minister for Health Stephen Smith from December 2001 to February 2003 and then Parliamentary Secretary to federal Labor leaders Simon Crean, Mark Latham, Kim Beazley and Kevin Rudd from February 2003 to December 2007. When Rudd become Prime Minister, Murphy became the Parliamentary Secretary to the Minister for Trade. He left this position, citing family reasons, in a ministerial reshuffle which occurred on 19 February 2009.

Following an electoral redistribution in 2009, Murphy's electorate was renamed Reid following significant changes to its boundaries. On 4 December 2009, he was preselected unopposed as Labor's candidate for the federal electorate of Reid.

Murphy narrowly retained Reid in 2010 with a swing of 11% swing against him. However, he was defeated in 2013 by Liberal candidate Craig Laundy on a 2.7% swing.

== Views ==
He is a member of the NSW Right and holds socially conservative views on most moral issues, such as abortion and stem-cell research. Murphy campaigned against the Howard Government's removal of cross-media ownership restrictions and has been a long-standing critic of media proprietors, such as Rupert Murdoch and the late Kerry Packer. He has also campaigned against any expansion of Sydney Airport and once told the House of Representatives that the Chairman of Sydney Airport, Max Moore-Wilton, "should be flogged" for his failure to act on aircraft noise which is a major issue in his electorate of Lowe.

During his term in Parliament, Murphy expressed strong views opposing same-sex marriage in Australia. In an interview on 27 August 2011, Murphy claimed that his electorate he had a large number of Christian and Islamic voters and that granting permission to homosexuals and lesbians to marry was "a step too far". The interview sparked further debate on the topic within Labor.

Parliament of Australia
Preceded by Paul Zammit	Member for Lowe; 1998–2010	Division abolished
Preceded by Laurie Ferguson	Member for Reid; 2010–2013	Succeeded by Craig Laundy
