= Division of Lowe =

Former Australian federal electoral division

Coordinates: 33°30′S 151°00′E

Lowe Australian House of Representatives Division
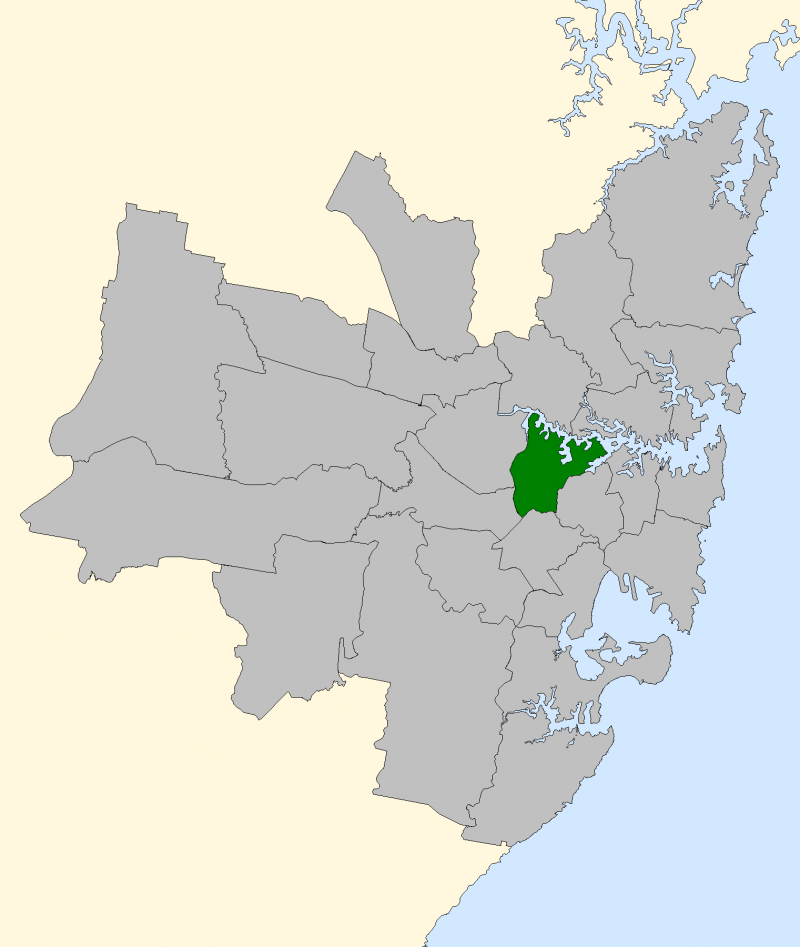
- Division of Lowe (green) in New South Wales prior to abolition
- Created: 1949
- Abolished: 2010
- Namesake: Robert Lowe
- Electors: 87,153
- Area: 39 km^{2} (15.1 sq mi)
- Demographic: Inner metropolitan

The Division of Lowe was an Australian Electoral Division in the state of New South Wales. It was located in the inner western suburbs of Sydney, on the south shore of the Parramatta River. It included the suburbs of Drummoyne, Five Dock, Croydon, Croydon Park, Burwood, Enfield, Homebush, Strathfield, Concord, Rhodes, Canada Bay, Cabarita, Abbotsford and Mortlake.

The division was named after the Rt Hon Robert Lowe, 1st Viscount Sherbrooke, a former Member of the New South Wales Legislative Council, and former Home Secretary of the United Kingdom. The division was proclaimed at the redistribution of 11 May 1949, and was first contested at the 1949 federal election. It was first held by Sir William McMahon, who retained the seat for over 32 years, until 1982. He was prime minister from 1971 to 1972.

Following the 2009 redistribution of NSW, the seat of Lowe was abolished for the 2010 Australian federal election. Most of the area of Lowe, together with a small part of the seat of Reid to its west, were reconstituted as the new Reid.

== Members ==
Image	Member	Party	Term	Notes
	Sir William McMahon (1908–1988)	Liberal	10 December 1949 – 4 January 1982	Served as minister under Menzies, Holt, McEwen and Gorton. Served as Prime Minister from 1971 to 1972. Resigned to retire from politics
	Michael Maher (1936–2013)	Labor	13 March 1982 – 11 July 1987	Previously held the New South Wales Legislative Assembly seat of Drummoyne. Lost seat
	Bob Woods (1947–)	Liberal	11 July 1987 – 13 March 1993	Lost seat. Later appointed to the Senate in 1994
	Mary Easson (1955–)	Labor	13 March 1993 – 2 March 1996	Lost seat
	Paul Zammit (1941–)	Liberal	2 March 1996 – 9 February 1998	Previously held the New South Wales Legislative Assembly seat of Strathfield. Lost seat
	Paul Zammit (1941–)	Independent	9 February 1998 – 3 October 1998	Previously held the New South Wales Legislative Assembly seat of Strathfield. Lost seat
	John Murphy (1950–)	Labor	3 October 1998 – 21 August 2010	Transferred to the Division of Reid after Lowe was abolished in 2010

== Election results ==
=== 2007 ===
2007 Australian federal election: Lowe
Party	Candidate	Votes	%	±%
Labor	John Murphy	38,766	49.27	+6.23
Liberal	Jim Tsolakis	31,518	40.06	−2.90
Greens	Marc Rerceretnam	6,774	8.61	−0.07
Christian Democrats	Bill Shailer	1,616	2.05	+0.04
Total formal votes		78,674	95.05	+1.65
Informal votes		4,098	4.95	−1.65
Turnout		82,772	94.97	+1.56
Two-party-preferred result
Labor	John Murphy	45,136	57.37	+4.34
Liberal	Jim Tsolakis	33,538	42.63	−4.34
Labor hold		Swing	+4.34	
