= Keep Sydney Open =

The Open Party
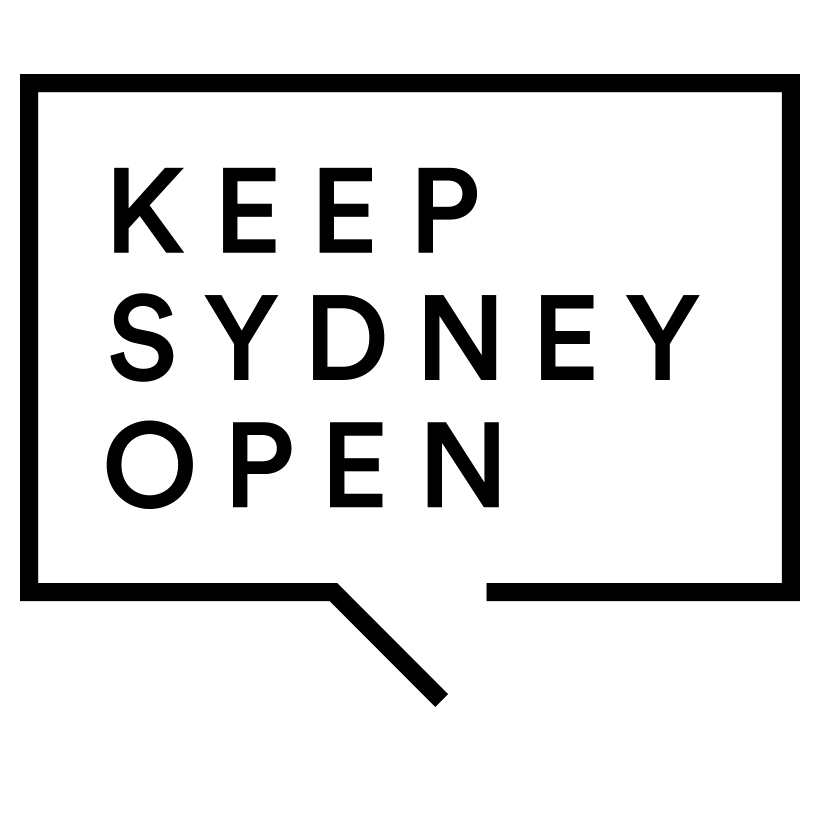
- Abbreviation: TOP
- Founded: February 2014 (as movement); January 2018 (as party)
- Dissolved: December 2022
- Succeeded by: Elizabeth Farrelly Independents
- Ideology: Anti-lockout laws
- Colours: White and black
- Former names: Keep Sydney Open (2018–2020)

Website
- keepsydneyopen.com

Keep Sydney Open (KSO) was an organisation and political party based in Sydney, Australia, that advocated for issues surrounding the city's nightlife and night-time economy. The group is best known for its opposition to the Sydney lockout laws. It was renamed to The Open Party in 2020.

The party's registration was later utilized in 2022 by Elizabeth Farrelly, who formed Elizabeth Farrelly Independents for the 2023 state election.

== History and beliefs ==
According to its website, Keep Sydney Open was founded by "a variety of key Sydney live music and performance venues, cultural organisations, artists and music industry stakeholders" in response to the "lockout regime" that was implemented by the Barry O'Farrell government in February 2014.

The group said that it is concerned about the closure of venues in Sydney, particularly in the Kings Cross, Oxford Street and CBD precincts, the attendant loss of jobs and the damage to tourism, and a loss of vibrancy in Sydney's nightlife. Members have also critiqued the increasing privatisation of Sydney's annual New Years Eve celebrations, arguing it should be free to attend.

In 2018 the Keep Sydney Open Campaign successfully registered as a Political Party to run in the 2019 NSW State elections. The founding members and management team consisted of Tyson Koh, Madeline Jane Dwyer, Joseph O’Donoghue, Eoin Maher, Iyanoosh Reporter, Allison Sims and Stephan Győry.

The party was later renamed to The Open Party in 2020, but largely was dormant as the lockout laws ended.

== Protests and rallies ==
Keep Sydney Open organised a protest rally which took place on 21 February 2016, commencing in Belmore Park and then moving to Hyde Park, Sydney. Some reports estimated that 15,000 people were in attendance. The group arranged for the protest to be addressed by a number of high-profile individuals, including Dave Faulkner of band the Hoodoo Gurus, Isabella Manfredi of The Preatures, Nina Las Vegas, and Crikey journalist Bernard Keane. Performing at the rally were Royal Headache, Art vs. Science and Future Classic DJs.

Another rally was held by Keep Sydney Open in October 2016. The organisers estimated that about 4,000 people attended the rally. The rally was widely reported for gaining the support of Cold Chisel frontman Jimmy Barnes and its amusing protest signs.

The group had plans to hold a third rally in January 2017, this time in the Kings Cross precinct but NSW Police successfully brought a last-minute application in the NSW Supreme Court for a "prohibition order" under the Summary Offences Act 1988. Shortly after, Keep Sydney Open's campaign organiser, Tyson Koh, said that they would hold a "bigger, louder" rally instead. A rally was then held in Martin Place on 18 February 2017.

On 1 July 2017, Keep Sydney Open held a music festival in Kings Cross called "Meet Me in The Cross", which included performances by Dappled Cities, Hermitude, Nina Las Vegas, and Thundamentals. The Kings Cross Hotel continued to display a Keep Sydney Open banner after the festival was held, until it was forced to take the banner down after a pro-lockouts residents group complained to the local council.

== Election ==
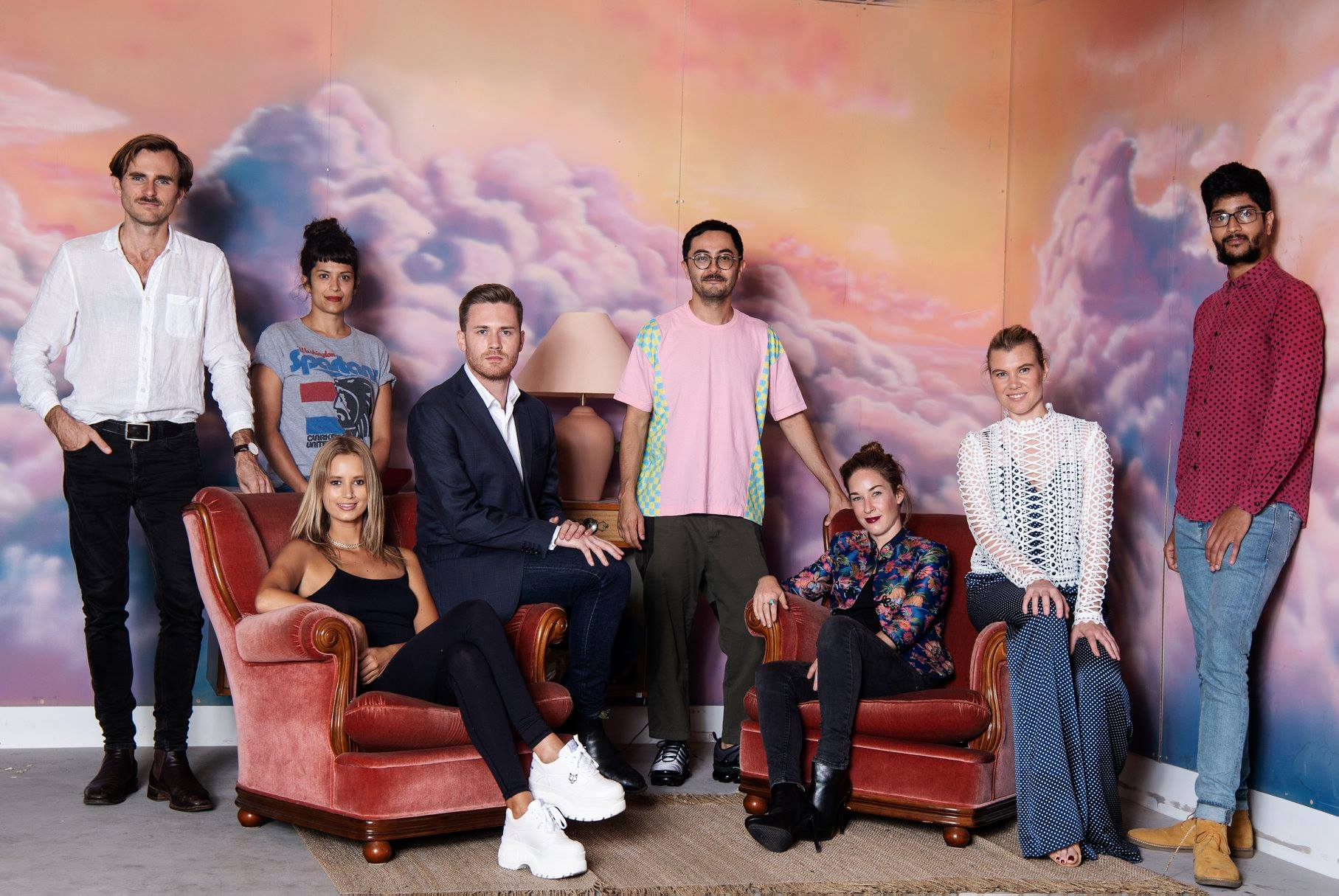
Keep Sydney Open candidates for the NSW Legislative Council

On 18 October 2017, Keep Sydney Open published a video to their Facebook page asking their sizeable audience whether they should run for NSW parliament. Response to the video from Keep Sydney Open’s base was largely positive and they registered in the 2019 New South Wales state election.

Keep Sydney Open fielded 61 candidates: 41 in local electorates for the Legislative Assembly and 20 for the Legislative Council. Receiving 81,508 primary votes for the LC, they just fell short of getting a candidate elected, but their preferences flowed to the Animal Justice Party who achieved 86,713 primary votes and successfully gained a Legislative Council seat.

While not attainting parliamentary representation, the level of support for, and interest in, Keep Sydney Open's campaign made the lockouts a key focus of the election. The newly re-elected Liberal government convened a nighttime industry round table to advise Joint Select Committee on Sydney's Night Time Economy into the lockouts. 40 recommendations around music, entertainment and the night time economy resulted from this inquiry, all of which were supported by the government.

== See also ==
- List of political parties in Australia
- Culture of Sydney
