= Virginia Judge =

Australian politician

The Honourable Virginia Judge
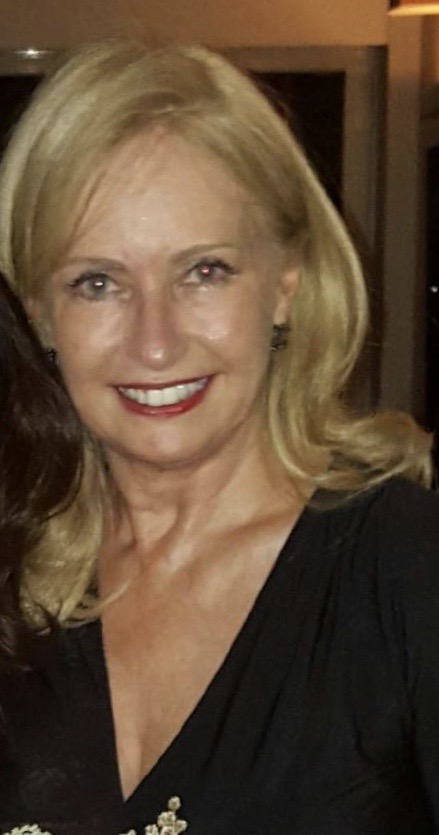

Member of the New South Wales Legislative Assembly for Strathfield
- In office 22 March 2003 – 26 March 2011
- Preceded by: Paul Whelan
- Succeeded by: Charles Casuscelli

Personal details
- Born: Dianne Virginia Judge; 19 August 1956 Cooma, New South Wales, Australia
- Died: 24 February 2026 (aged 69)
- Party: Labor Party

Dianne Virginia Judge (19 August 1956 – 24 February 2026) was a former Australian politician, who was a member of the New South Wales Legislative Assembly representing Strathfield for the Labor Party from 2003 until 2011.

== Early life ==
Judge was born in Cooma, New South Wales, and educated in her early years in both Canberra and New Delhi, India, where her father was posted as a diplomat associated with the Columbo Plan. She later returned to Canberra for her secondary schooling. From an early age Judge was an aspiring coloratura soprano, and won many awards in the Australian National Eisteddfod in Canberra. She obtained distinctions at 6th grade with the NSW Music Examinations Advisory Board in each of Speech and Drama, Pianoforte and Music Theory. Unfortunately, her intended career as an opera singer was cut short by vocal cord polyps.

She received a Bachelor of Education from the Canberra College of Advanced Education (later University of Canberra) and the Canberra School of Music.

Judge taught in primary and secondary schools in both Sydney and Canberra. She also worked as a volunteer abroad for the Overseas Service Bureau in Tonga and as a project officer for small non-government organisation, The Australian Foundation for the Peoples of the South Pacific, now known as Action on Poverty, delivering items such as humidicribs, toilets and ovens to Pacific islands such as Nauru, the Solomon Islands and Fiji. While working in Tonga as an overseas volunteer she was employed as a teacher at Queen Salote College, a very large high school in Nuku’alofa in Tonga. After her work in Tonga, Judge returned to Sydney and resumed her teaching career, including at Evondale Special School for students with intellectual disabilities. She also studied law part-time at Macquarie University.

== Local government career ==
Judge was elected to Strathfield Municipal Council in 1995, and was reelected with overwhelming community support, enabling her to serve as Mayor of Strathfield from 2000 to 2003, the first woman from the Australian Labor Party in this role.

== Political career ==
On 23 March 2003 Judge was elected to the Legislative Assembly of New South Wales as the first woman to represent the NSW seat of Strathfield.

In May 2007, following the re-election of the Labor Government led by Morris Iemma, she was appointed Parliamentary Secretary Assisting the Minister for Education & Training, Industrial Relations, and the Minister Assisting the Minister for Finance.

In September 2008, when Nathan Rees became Premier, she was appointed Minister Assisting the Premier on the Arts, Minister for Citizenship, and Minister for Fair Trading.

In the cabinet re-shuffle following Rees being replaced as Premier by Kristina Keneally, Judge retained the portfolio of Fair Trading, and became Minister for the Arts, the first woman to hold this portfolio in NSW. She held these portfolios until the ALP lost office at the 2011 election.

== Post political career ==
In July 2011, Judge became head of strategic partnerships at the Children's Medical Research Institute an independent medical research institute which commenced operations in 1958 as part of the Royal Alexandra Hospital for Children in Camperdown, Sydney.

Judge left CMRI in late 2018 and then took up the position of business development manager at the Heart Research Institute (HRI) in Newtown, Sydney. Judge left HRI in December 2020.

In 2013, Judge became a board member of the Riverside Theatres Parramatta and board member of Gallery 49 Marrickville. Judge had been a long time Vanguard member of the Sydney Symphony Orchestra and the Sydney Dance Company since 2011. Judge is actively involved in the activities of the Australian Museum where she was appointed a trustee and director of the Australian Museum Foundation in October 2016, and with the Royal Society of New South Wales (RSN), where she was elected a Fellow (FRSN) in July 2017. She was shortly afterwards elected to the Council of the RSN.

== Notes ==
New South Wales Legislative Assembly
Preceded by Paul Whelan	Member for Strathfield; 2003–2011	Succeeded by Charles Casuscelli
Political offices
Preceded by Nathan Rees	Minister for the Arts; 2009–2011	Succeeded by George Souris
Preceded by Linda Burney	Minister for Fair Trading; 2008–2011	Succeeded by Anthony Roberts
Preceded by Morris Iemma	Minister for Citizenship; 2008–2009	Succeeded by John Hatzistergos
Vacant Title last held by Frank Sartor	Minister Assisting the Premier on the Arts; 2008–2009	Vacant
Civic offices
Preceded by Laurel O'Toole	Mayor of Strathfield; 2000–2003	Succeeded by John Abi-Saab
