= Flower Power Garden Centre =

Chain of garden centres in Australia

Flower Power
- Company type: Private limited company
- Industry: Agribusiness
- Headquarters: Sydney, Australia
- Area served: Australia
- Key people: Mark Chester
- Products: Fruit; Vegetables; Other food products
- Revenue: AUD 1,328.7 million (FY2022)
- Parent: Alceon Group
- Website: www.flowerpower.com.au

Flower Power is an Australian chain of garden centres. In 2019, it sold its original nursery in Moorebank to finance the construction of a new modern "garden centre of the future" in Milperra.

== See also ==
- Gardening in Australia
