= Charles Casuscelli =

Australian politician (1956–2025)

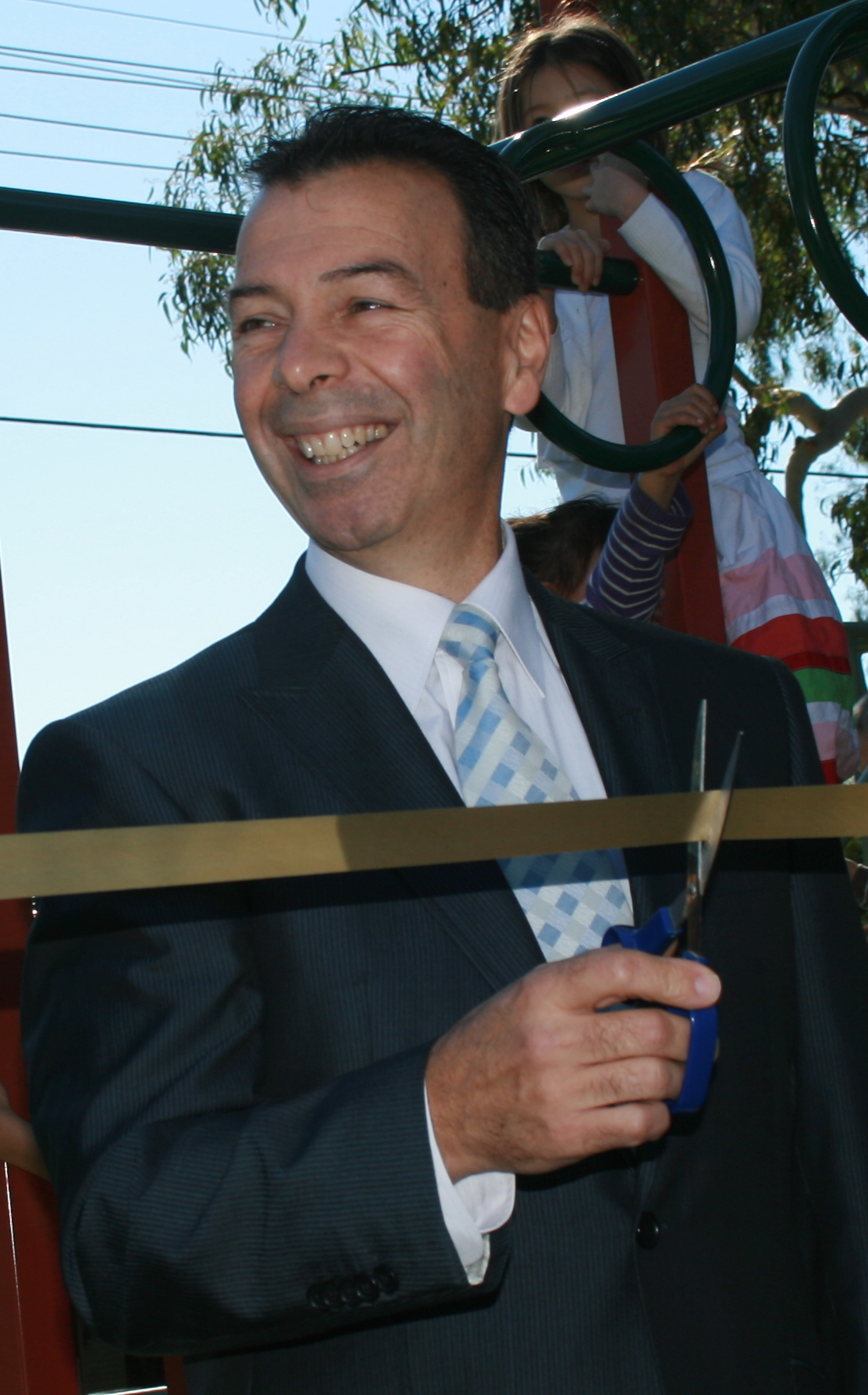

Member of the New South Wales Parliament for Strathfield
- In office 26 March 2011 – 6 March 2015
- Preceded by: Virginia Judge
- Succeeded by: Jodi McKay

Personal details
- Born: 22 October 1956 Rome, Italy
- Died: 20 June 2025 (aged 68) NSW, Australia
- Party: Liberal Party
- Spouse: Maria
- Education: Blacktown Boys High School
- Occupation: Politician

Charles Casuscelli (Italian: [kazuʃˈʃɛlli]; 22 October 1956 – 20 June 2025) was an Australian politician, who was a member of the New South Wales Legislative Assembly representing Strathfield for the Liberal Party from 2011 to 2015.

== Early years and background ==
Casuscelli was born in Rome, Italy and emigrated to Australia in 1963, aged seven years. His family established their home in Blacktown, Sydney and he was a student firstly at Blacktown North Public Primary school and then Blacktown Boys High School. At 16 years of age, he opted to enter the workforce as a Trainee in the Postmaster-General's Department.

He was married to Maria and was the father of two daughters.

== Professional career ==
Casuscelli completed his technical training as a telecommunications technical officer just as the Postmaster-General's Department was split into Australia Post and Telecom.

He advanced to the role of project manager developing computer systems to enable real-time management of telecommunications services. He left Telecom Australia and undertook continuous full-time service as an officer with the regular army from 1988 to 1992. He was appointed as a staff officer (captain) at Headquarters Australian Defence Force and later as a major on the Headquarters of Land Command. He was responsible for the planning and implementation of command, control and communications systems within the combat elements of the Australian Army.

Casuscelli's first senior management appointment in the private sector was with the market research company AC Nielsen, he had two roles the first as national operations manager for the Media Research Division and later as director of business re-engineering for the Australian business. Many years later he returned to the company as director of operations for the Pacific region.

Casuscelli joined the Roads & Traffic Authority in October 1997. Holding a dual role, he was the NSW Transport Management Centre's project director responsible for establishing the new facility.

In 2001, he commenced work as a senior executive with the NRMA Motoring and Services. After a relatively short period ~ 2 years he set up his own private consultancy and delivered professional services to the transport, telecommunications, OH&S, marketing and advertising industries.

In amongst his continuous full-time service with the Australian army, Casuscelli had been an Army Reserve Signal Corp officer since 1978 having served in a range of appointments including officer commanding a Royal Australian Signal Corp unit. He held the Reserve Force decoration in recognition of his service.

Casuscelli was also a member of the South West Metropolitan District Emergency Management Committee and worked with the emergency services and other public agencies to ensure that Sydney's Inner West is prepared for major emergencies.

== Political career ==
After leaving the RTA and going back into the private sector in 2001. Casuscelli's attention became directed towards what he saw as the growing ineptness of the Labor government to effectively deal with transport and roads issues. He made a number of media appearances highlighting Government failures in such things as managing incidents on the road network, criticising the unnecessary duplication of the Iron Cove bridge, waste and mismanagement of Government especially the aborted CBD Metro.

After joining the Five Dock branch of the Liberal Party in February 2009, Casuscelli was preselected as the Liberal candidate in November 2010. At the March 2011, he contested the seat of Strathfield and ran against the sitting member and Labor minister, Virginia Judge. Casuscelli was elected with a swing of 16.3 points and winning the seat with 54.4 per cent of the two-party vote.

Casuscelli was appointed as the chair of the Legislative Assembly Committee on Transport and Infrastructure. Casuscelli recognised the substantial challenges facing NSW in the provision of transport infrastructure, especially the issue of funding. The committee subsequently resolved to conduct formal inquiries into the "Utilisation of Air Space and Adjacent Land Along the Rail Corridor" and "Road Access Pricing" both of which have the potential to fund future improvements to transport infrastructure.

Casuscelli served as a member of the Joint Select Committee on Sentencing of Child Sexual Assault Offenders that made a number of recommendations to government in response to community concerns that judicial sentences were manifestly inadequate.

Casuscelli was appointed as a member of the Legislative Assembly Committee on Law and Safety in Sep 2014.

As the member for Strathfield, experienced in transport issues his attention soon turned to the issue of the M4 "Missing Link", and he grew fond of saying that progressing the M4/WestConnex project was "his baby". He has repeatedly argued that it was the single most effective project to improve the quality of life for the residents of the inner west of Sydney as well to as make a substantial contribution to the economy of NSW. It was something absolutely essential, he argued, the "completion of the M4 East". The announcement of the WestConnex was the culmination of a personal crusade that began in 1997 as the general manager of the Transport Management Centre to have this critical missing link in the motorway network completed. Charles is also a strong advocate for increased commuter parking as a way of getting private cars off the road.

Casuscelli was appointed as co-chair of three Ministerial Consultative Committees representing the Korean, Chinese and Russian communities on behalf of the Minister for Citizenship and Communities the Hon Victor Dominello MP. One of the first outcomes of these committees was that an inquiry was established by the Community Relations Commission to investigate Human Trafficking and the Exploitation of Asian Sex Workers.

He was defeated in 2015 by Labor candidate Jodi McKay.

== Post Politics ==
In 2015, Casuscelli was appointed CEO of the Western Sydney Regional Organisation of Councils (WSROC).

He served in this role until 2025.

== Death ==
Casuscelli died suddenly in June 2025 at the age of 68.

New South Wales Legislative Assembly
Preceded by Virginia Judge	Member for Strathfield; 2011–2015	Succeeded by Jodi McKay
