= Paul Whelan (politician) =

Australian politician (1943–2019)

The Honourable Paul Whelan

Member of the New South Wales Legislative Assembly for Ashfield
- In office 1 May 1976 – 5 March 1999
- Preceded by: David Hunter
- Succeeded by: Abolished

Member of the New South Wales Legislative Assembly for Strathfield
- In office 27 March 1999 – 28 February 2003
- Preceded by: Bruce MacCarthy
- Succeeded by: Virginia Judge
- Constituency: Strathfield

New South Wales Minister for Police
- In office 4 April 1995 – 21 November 2001
- Premier: Bob Carr
- Preceded by: Garry West
- Succeeded by: Michael Costa

Personal details
- Born: Paul Francis Patrick Whelan; 12 December 1943 Ashbury, New South Wales
- Died: 30 October 2019 (aged 75)
- Party: Labor Party
- Profession: Lawyer

Paul Francis Patrick Whelan (12 December 1943 – 30 October 2019) was an Australian politician, who served as the New South Wales Minister for Police between 1995 and 2001.

== Early years and background ==
Whelan was born and raised in Ashbury, a suburb of Sydney, Australia to Mary Bridget and John Joseph Whelan. He was the youngest of their seven children. He was educated at St Francis Xavier Primary School, Ashbury, De La Salle College, Ashfield, and the University of Sydney, where he received an LL.B. He was admitted as a solicitor in 1968 and barrister in 1988. He married Colleen Mary Healey in 1968 and had two daughters, two sons and eight grandchildren. He was an alderman on the Ashfield Municipal Council from 1970 to 1976 and Mayor from 1971 to 1976.

== Political career ==
Whelan represented Ashfield from May 1976 to March 1999 and Strathfield from March 1999 to February 2003 for the Labor Party. He was Minister for Consumer Affairs and Minister for Roads from October 1981 to February 1983 and then Minister for Water Resources and Minister for Forests until April 1984 during the Wran government. He was also Minister for Aboriginal Affairs from February to April 1984. He was Minister for Police from April 1995 to November 2001 during the Carr government. Whelan retired from politics in 2003. Virginia Judge succeeded in replacing him in his seat.

New South Wales Legislative Assembly
Preceded by David Hunter	Member for Ashfield; 1976–1999	District abolished
Preceded by Bruce MacCarthy	Member for Strathfield; 1999–2003	Succeeded by Virginia Judge
