= Bruce MacCarthy =

Australian politician (1948–2025)

Bruce Edward MacCarthy (15 October 1948 — 25 February 2025) was an Australian politician. He was the Liberal Party member for Strathfield in the New South Wales Legislative Assembly from 1996 to 1999.

MacCarthy was born in Denistone, a suburb of Sydney, to parents Thornton and Constance. He attended Homebush Boys' High School, graduating in 1965. He attended the University of Sydney from 1966 to 1968, where he received a Bachelor of Science (Pure Mathematics), and joined the Liberal Party on 14 March 1967. On 8 August 1974 he married Leanne Gaye Hilder at Concord, with whom he had three daughters. He received a Bachelor of Economics (Public Finance) in 1976 from the University of New England, and worked as a public sector manager. His most prominent position was as Manager of Public Affairs for the Electricity Association of New South Wales, 1988–95.

In 1996, the Liberal MP for the local state seat of Strathfield, Paul Zammit, resigned to contest the Australian House of Representatives. MacCarthy was selected as the Liberal candidate for the resulting by-election, which he won with little difficulty. In 1999, however, Strathfield was redistributed and took in large parts of Ashfield, a Labor seat. Although the margin was still notionally Liberal, MacCarthy was resoundingly defeated by Ashfield Labor MP Paul Whelan.

After his defeat, MacCarthy worked as a part-time member of the New South Wales Election Funding Authority until 2003. In 2006 he was appointed a senior member of the Migration Review Tribunal.

New South Wales Legislative Assembly
Preceded by Paul Zammit	Member for Strathfield; 1996–1999	Succeeded by Paul Whelan
