= Elizabeth Farrelly =

New Zealand-Australian architecture critic and writer

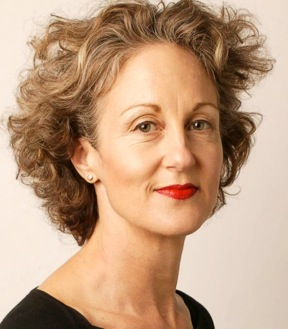

Councillor of the City of Sydney
- In office 1991–1995

Personal details
- Born: Dunedin, New Zealand
- Party: Elizabeth Farrelly Independents (2022–present)
- Other political affiliations: Independent (1991–2021, 2022); Labor (2021)
- Education: University of Sydney (PhD)
- Occupation: Writer and academic

Elizabeth Margaret Farrelly (born Dunedin, New Zealand), is a Sydney-based author, architecture critic, essayist, columnist and speaker who was born in New Zealand but later became an Australian citizen. She has contributed to current debates about aesthetics and ethics; design, public art and architecture; urban and natural environments; society and politics, including criticism of the treatment of Julian Assange. Profiles of her have appeared in the New Zealand Architect, Urbis, The Australian Financial Review, the Australian Architectural Review, and Australian Geographic.

Farrelly's range of interests and contributions are wide enough to have caused her to be described by broadcaster Geraldine Doogue as a "Renaissance woman". She was elected to the 2021 board of the National Trust of Australia (NSW).

Her portrait by Mirra Whale was a finalist in the 2015 Archibald Prize at the Art Gallery of New South Wales.

== Education and training ==
Farrelly was born in Dunedin, New Zealand, and trained as an architect in Auckland. She left New Zealand in 1983 for London, moved to Sydney in October 1988 and became an Australian citizen in 1991. She holds a PhD in architecture from the University of Sydney. Her thesis examined of the intellectual, cultural and political background to development control in Sydney's city centre from 1900 to 1960.

== Career ==
=== Architectural practice ===
Farrelly practised as an architect in London until 1988, working at Pollard Thomas and Edwards Architects, London; at JASMaD Architects, Auckland; and Warren and Mahoney, Christchurch.

=== Public service ===
From 1991 to 1995, she served as an independent on the council of the City of Sydney, and was a member of the Central Sydney Planning Committees, Chair of the Civic Design Sub-Committee, and member, with Paul Keating, of the Project Control Group for the East Circular Quay redevelopment, adjacent to the Sydney Opera House. Her interest focussed on the quality of the city's public spaces. She served as a juror for design awards such as Parramatta Design Excellence Awards and the Royal Australian Institute of Architects Awards.

Farrelly ran as an independent in the 2022 Strathfield state by-election, coming in third place with 9.85% of first preference votes. She was also an independent candidate for the Legislative Council in the 2023 New South Wales state election.

=== Teaching ===
Farrelly has taught at the University of Sydney as well as the University of New South Wales where she is Associate Professor (Practice) in the UNSW Graduate School of Urbanism; the University of Technology, Sydney, where she was Adjunct Associate Professor of Architecture; the University of Auckland; the Royal College of Art, London; the Humberside Polytechnic and the Architectural Association School of Architecture, London. Farrelly has set writing for Wikipedia as a task for post-graduate students, and has commented that its demand for every input to be traceable and published, enables "genuine crowd-sourcing of scholarship" and is both "a revelation and a revolution".

=== Criticism and commentary ===
As a professional architecture critic, Farrelly has quoted a study saying that architecture is "the most public art form and, curiously, the least subject to public debate" but that its task is to "distinguish the good, the bad and the reasons". As an urban design professional, she wrote: "Towns are public things. They centre on shared delight, with roosting space not just for the rich but for all, and not just for the body, but the soul." Her essays have been published internationally in specialist, professional and academic journals, including The Architectural Review, for which she was assistant editor and contributor from 1985 to 1987 and The Architects' Journal (London); The Architecture Bulletin; Architecture Australia; Architectural Theory Review; Architectural Record (New York); Architectural Design (Moscow); Metropole (New York); Statement (The Hague); and Bauwelt (Germany).

As well as analyses and reviews for academics and practitioners, Farrelly writes for the general public about the principles, morality, aesthetics and function of architecture, especially on Sydney. Critiques of major social issues encompass those relating to urban development, in particular transportation and building standards, as well as those relating to environmental degradation, and climate change.

Contributions for the general public appear in newspapers such as the New Zealand Herald and the National Business Review (NZ), and in The Sydney Morning Herald, for which she wrote a weekly column and regular essays until 2021. Writer Tim Blair has written about Farrelly in the Daily Telegraph, calling her a 'frightbat' and criticising her for charging people to work on her farm digging holes. Her essay on "the destructive myth of professionalism" was noted as among the editor's best comment pieces of 2015. Critiques concerning other significant Australian buildings include those relating to proposed changes to the Australian War Memorial in Canberra, and the proposed destruction of Sydney's Powerhouse Museum along with the break up of its unique collections. In December 2021, Farrelly's three-decade association with The Sydney Morning Herald came to an end when her column was terminated by editor Bevan Shields, after Farrelly had registered as a Labor Party candidate for Strathfield in the 2021 local government elections and had subsequently written a piece criticising Liberal and independent candidates in that election without declaring her own potential candidacy.

In her role as critic and commentator, Farrelly has had reviews of books and exhibitions published in a range of journals. She has also been interviewed by the television and radio media, including the Australian Broadcasting Corporation (ABC) and the BBC World Service. Reviews include "Superior Seidler – Review of Harry Seidler" in Architectural Review (London). Interviews include for the programs of Philip Adams, Mike Carlton, David Marr, Kerry O’Brien, Margaret Throsby, and Alan Saunders.

=== Public speaking ===
Farrelly has been invited to speak at a wide range of public events, including panels, symposia, conferences, and festivals. Examples include as speaker in 2004 and 2005 on "Sydney's Working Harbour" at the Working Harbour Forum in the Sydney Town Hall; in July 2007 at the Byron Bay Writers Festival; in May 2009 and 2013 at the Sydney Writers' Festival; in October 2010 and 2015 at the Festival of Dangerous Ideas in the Sydney Opera House in October 2011 at the Adelaide Festival of Ideas; in October 2012 as panellist at the University of Sydney's Sesquicentenary Colloquium Dinner, where her topic was "Dreaming Spires: Architecture and the learning game"; in 2011 and 2012 as speaker at the Art After Hours program in the Art Gallery of New South Wales; in May 2012 at the Museum of Contemporary Art Australia on "Writing Architecture"; in August 2014 as keynote speaker at the Green Buildings Conference in South Africa; in October 2015 for the year's final Utzon lecture at the University of New South Wales on "Architecture and Morality," exploring the relationship between ethics and aesthetics in architecture; in 2015 at the New Zealand Institute of Architects and on "Beauty" at the St James Institute in Sydney; in 2018 on "Architecture, cities and houses, design, the arts, planning, the environment and social commentary" at Sydney University's Sydney Centennial Symposium: "Cathedral Thinking – Designing for the Next Century". In April 2026, Farrelly chaired the Better Cities Initiative public forum "What Is Coming For Canada Bay?".

Farrelly has interviewed and spoken at events by the Doing Density Better group, an organisation expressing community concern to recent housing planning changes with four key messages. On July 7 she spoke at the launch of the group at NSW Parliament House, attended by 27 community groups, concluding with a call for residents to advocate for housing planning policies to reflect interests of local communities. On July 9 Farrelly interviewed Jacqui Brosnan about the group, also the leader of Drummoyne Responsible Development Action Group for which Farrelly has been an "amazing support".

== Elizabeth Farrelly Independents ==
Elizabeth Farrelly Independents
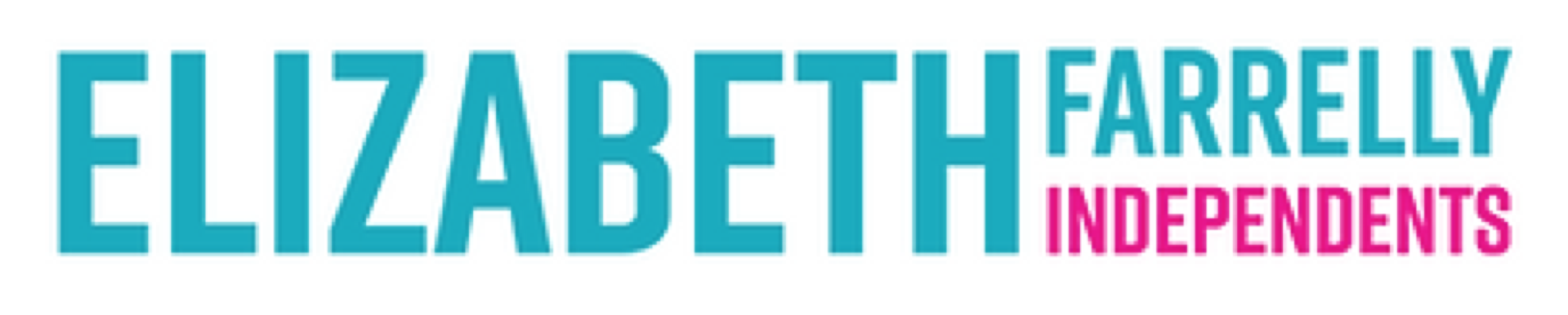
- Abbreviation: EFI
- Leader: Elizabeth Farrelly
- Founded: November 2022
- Preceded by: The Open Party
- NSW Legislative Council: 0 / 42

Elizabeth Farrelly Independents is a political party founded by Farrelly to compete in the 2023 New South Wales state election. She led the party's Legislative Council ticket after rebadging The Open Party, formerly known as Keep Sydney Open, to run after the party largely became dormant. It received 1.32% of the total statewide vote.

== The Sydneyist ==
Farrelly presents a podcast series entitled The Sydneyist on community radio channel Eastside Radio in which she interviews a wide range of experts and people engaged with issues affecting the city of Sydney. Example episodes include discussions with:

- Architect Richard Francis Jones on why the Public School in Darlington, New South Wales was judged to be the 2024 Best Building in the World by the World Architecture Festival;
- Architect Tim Williams about what can be learned from Paris's response to common problems;
- Greens Councillor in the Municipality of Woollahra, Nicola Grieve about the destruction of 595 mature trees at the Royal Sydney Golf Club;
- Youth Representative to the Commonwealth Association of Architects, architect Hugo Chan, about sharing lessons learned by young architects around the world.

== The Better Cities Initiative ==
Farrelly was the founder and Chief Executive Officer of The Better Cities Initiative, which operated in New South Wales and was registered with the Australian Charities and Not-for-profits Commission on 12 October 2023. Partnered with The New Democracy Foundation and The Nature Conservation Council (NSW), it was “dedicated to transforming the way cities are planned, developed and governed” in response to the triple crises facing our cities, namely, a housing affordability crisis, a climate crisis and a crisis of trust in democracy.

Farrelly said “housing needs to be affordable for children, low-income earners, creative people and key workers who all need to live in cities”. The Better Cities Initiative was also concerned with liveable apartments that have beauty and comfort. It addresses the complexities surrounding the politics of designing for the built environment as well as the need for robust criticism to improve policy so that cities will be fairer and more sustainable places to live.

In April 2026, Farrelly chaired the Better Cities Initiative public forum "What Is Coming For Canada Bay?" Speakers included Jacqui Brosnan, Amanda Bull and Philip Thalis.

In June 2026, Farrelly announced that the Better Cities Initiative would be wound down on June 30 due to a lack of funds. Farrelly stated some of the Better Cities team were involved in setting up "a new organisation to pursue deliberative democracy at a federal level".

== Published works ==
=== Books ===
- Farrelly, E. M. (1993). Three houses : Glenn Murcutt. Anthony Browell, John Hewitt. London: Phaidon Press. ISBN 0-7148-2875-0. OCLC 29538250.
- Farrelly, E. M. (2007). Blubberland : the dangers of happiness. Sydney: UNSW Press. ISBN 978-0-86840-837-8. OCLC 271074224.
- Farrelly, Elizabeth (2011). Potential difference : assays and sorties. Sydney, N.S.W.: Blurb. ISBN 978-0-646-58928-2. OCLC 824118495.
- H2o Architects to 2012. Collingwood, Vic.: Macmillan Art Publishing. 2012. ISBN 978-1-921394-98-0. OCLC 828711592.
- Farrelly, Elizabeth (2014). Caro was here. Newtown, N.S.W.: Walker Books. ISBN 978-1-922244-83-3. OCLC 870671768.
- Farrelly, E. M. (2021). Killing Sydney : the fight for a city's soul. Sydney, New South Wales: Picador Australia. ISBN 978-1-76055-258-9. OCLC 1237338527.

=== Part books ===
- (1991) " 'Why Sydney Finds it so Hard to Shape Up,’ review of planning failures in Ultimo-Pyrmont" in Waterfront housing and inner city redevelopment: proceedings of the Sydney seminar, Lea, J.P. and Dalton S., (Eds), Ian Buchan Fell Research Centre, Faculty of Architecture, University of Sydney, Sydney ISBN 0855770228
- (1998) "Architecture and Urban Design" in The Best of Sydney, Ross Muller (ed), Sydney Morning Herald Books, Sydney, ISBN 1862901236
- (2005) "Pipedreaming the Harbour" in Sitelines: aspects of Sydney Harbour: a collection of essays celebrating Sydney Harbour, Federation Trust, ISBN 0975109405
- (2005) "Powerhouse, Dreaming House", in Yesterday's Tomorrows: the Powerhouse Museum and its precursors 1880-2005, Graeme Davison and Kimberley Webber (eds), Powerhouse Publishing with UNSW Press, Haymarket, NSW, ISBN 0868409855
- (2006) "'Beauty, Exclusionism and Stuff; the basis of community?’" in Talking about Sydney: population, community and culture in contemporary Sydney, Robert Freestone, Bill Randolph and Carol Butler-Bowdon (eds), UNSW Press with Historic Houses Trust, ISBN 0868409383
- (2008) "'Tall Tales', the advent of Sydney high-rise" in Modern Times: the untold story of modernism in Australia, Ann Stephen, Philip Goad and Andrew McNamara (eds) Miegunyah Press, Carlton, Victoria, ISBN 9780522855517
- (2008) "Sidney Nolan" and "'The Corner Shop" in Australian Greats, Peter Cochrane (ed) William Heinemann Australia, North Sydney NSW, ISBN 9781741665925
- (2009) "Sydney" in The Great Cities in History, John Julius Norwich (ed) London; New York, N.Y.: Thames & Hudson, ISBN 9780500251546

== Awards for writing ==
- (1991) CICA International Award for Architectural Criticism (Paris)
- (1994) & (2002) Adrian Ashton Award for Architectural Writing
- (2001) Pascall Prize for Critical Writing
- (2002) Marion Mahony Griffin Prize
