= Jason Li =

Australian politician

Jason Li MP

Member of the New South Wales Legislative Assembly for Strathfield
- Incumbent
- Assumed office 12 February 2022
- Preceded by: Jodi McKay

Personal details
- Born: Jason Yat-Sen Li; 28 September 1972 (age 54) Sydney, Australia
- Party: Labor
- Other political affiliations: Unity
- Education: Sydney Grammar School
- Alma mater: University of Sydney; New York University (LLM)
- Occupation: Businessman; Politician

Jason Yat-Sen Li (Chinese: 李逸仙; born 28 September 1972) is an Australian businessman and politician. He is a member of the Australian Labor Party (ALP) and was elected to the New South Wales Legislative Assembly at the 2022 Strathfield state by-election.

Li was a republican delegate to the 1998 Australian Constitutional Convention. He was one of the founders of the Unity Party and stood unsuccessfully as the party's lead Senate candidate at the 1998 federal election. He later joined the ALP and was an endorsed candidate at the 2013 and 2019 federal elections, prior to his election to state parliament in 2022.

== Early life ==
Li was born on 28 September 1972. He is the son of George and Pansy Li, Hong Kongers who first met while living in the same apartment block in Wan Chai. His mother migrated to New Zealand in 1958 and his father moved to Australia in 1960. They subsequently reunited and married in 1969, settling in the Sydney suburb of Bexley.

While living at Maroubra Beach, Li attended Sydney Grammar School because his father's business soon made the family independently wealthy. Li studied Arts-Law at the University of Sydney and, after graduating with his law degree, he moved to New York City. There, he completed a Masters of Law from New York University, highlighted by being recognised as Australia's Hauser Global Scholar.

== Business career ==
Li began his working career as a solicitor for Corrs Chambers Westgarth, working for the law firm until 1999. During this time, Li also briefly worked at the United Nations, for the International Criminal Tribunal for the former Yugoslavia at the Hague, Netherlands, working as an associate to H.E. Judge Lal Vohrah. During his time in New York in 2000, he was an Associate in the Corporate Division of Davis Polk & Wardwell.

On returning to Sydney he founded Professional Search Pty Ltd, working as executive director of the legal and accounting digital services platform. He sold this business in 2002.

Li then continued his professional career at Insurance Australia Group (IAG). From 2002 to 2004 he worked as the head of sustainability, with the responsibility of leading IAG's sustainability program for which IAG was named Sustainable Company of the Year in 2003. He was then promoted to Head of China Strategy from 2004 to 2005, working on IAG's acquisition of the China Automobile Association as well as strategic investment in China Pacific Insurance Co. In 2005 Li was appointed general manager of sales and marketing for the newly acquired IAG subsidiary China Automobile Association in Beijing.

In 2007 Li founded Yatsen Associates, a boutique cross-border corporate finance advisory firm, specialising in complex cross-border mergers and acquisitions and capital raising mandates. Many of Yatsen Associates' clientele have interests in oil, natural gas, clean energy, coal, and agricultural businesses in China and Central Asia.

From 2013 he has been the executive chair of Vantage Asia Holdings. Vantage Asia Holdings manages a broad portfolio of investments both in Asia and Australia, including resources and technology firms, retail hospitality, student accommodation and vitamins/supplements firms.

== Boards ==
Li has been heavily involved at his alma mater the University of Sydney as a Fellow of the University of Sydney Senate. He has served on the strategy and risk committee, the people and culture committee, and is currently chair of the risk and audit committee. Since 2021, Li has been a pro-chancellor of the university.

Previously Li had served as a non-executive director for nine years at the George Institute for Global Health, the region's leading medical research institute focused on non-communicable diseases. He has also served as a director of the Sydney Institute and is a previous youth chair of the NSW Ethnic Communities Council. Li has also been a non-executive director of the National Centre for Volunteering and a former governing member of the Smith Family charity.

From 2007 to 2013 he was on the board of the China-Australia Chamber of Commerce, Beijing including a stint as vice-chair from 2009 to 2011. He has also served on the board of the Asia Australia Institute. Li is an advisory board member of think-tank China Matters and is the current president of the Chinese Australian Forum since 2019. Li is also currently on the board of Asialink and the advisory board of HaymarketHQ.

Li is a member of the World Economic Forum and is a young global leader as well as on the Forum's Global Agenda Council on China.

In 2017 Li became chair of Refugee Talent, a software company that uses technology to assist refugees and migrants in Australia to secure meaningful employment.

== Politics ==
=== Early activities ===
Li was elected to the 1998 Australian Constitutional Convention as a republican delegate from New South Wales, running as a candidate for "A Multi-Cultural Voice". He came to notice as "a young, eloquent advocate for an Australian republic", describing the monarchy as an "elitist, sectarian, sexist institution, completely out of touch with modern Australia". He appeared in the national media to advocate a "Yes" vote at the 1999 Australian republic referendum, despite the opposition of some republicans to the final model chosen.

Following the rise of anti-immigration politician Pauline Hanson and her One Nation party, in 1998 Li helped to establish the multiculturalist Unity Party, along with Peter Wong, Mary Kalantzis, and Bill Cope. He was the party's lead Senate candidate in New South Wales at the 1998 federal election, but failed to win election.

=== ALP candidacies ===
Li was asked by prime minister Kevin Rudd to run as the Labor candidate for the seat of Bennelong at the 2013 federal election even though he did not live in the electorate. His selection came late in the campaign, following the withdrawal of original ALP candidate Jeff Silvestro-Martin due to an ICAC anti-corruption investigation. Li was defeated by the incumbent Liberal MP John Alexander. Li's wife Lucy is a close friend of Rudd's daughter Jessica. Li was given the seat of Bennelong by NSW Labor Head Office in absence of an ALP rank-and-file vote which allows local Labor branch members to democratically vote for their candidate. Li subsequently failed in his attempt to win the ALP pre-selection rank and file vote for the federal seat of Banks in 2018 toward the lead up to the 2019 Federal election.

Li was placed third on the ALP's Senate ticket in NSW for the 2019 federal election, behind Tony Sheldon and Tim Ayres. During the campaign he called for diversity targets to be introduced for federal parliament and criticised media narratives around dual loyalty of Chinese–Australians. Li has also commented in 2019 that Australia should consider investing in China's Belt and Road Initiative.

=== State MP ===
In 2021 Li was again endorsed as the third candidate on the ALP's Senate ticket for the next federal election. But in 2022 he was instead endorsed by NSW Labor as the party's candidate for the 2022 Strathfield state by-election, following the resignation of former party leader Jodi McKay. There was no rank-and-file vote by the local ALP members in the branches for the electorate.

Li retained Strathfield for the ALP at the by-election.

== Personal life ==
Li was born in Sydney, grew up in Bexley North, and went to Kingsgrove and Hurstville Public Schools.

Li and his family moved to China in 2005 and lived there for 8 years until 2013.

Li has three children with his wife Lucy. He speaks English, Mandarin, and Cantonese.

New South Wales Legislative Assembly
Preceded by Jodi McKay	Member for Strathfield; 2022–present	Incumbent
