= Paul Zammit =

Australian politician

Paul Zammit OAM

Member of the Australian Parliament for Lowe
- In office 2 March 1996 – 3 October 1998
- Preceded by: Mary Easson
- Succeeded by: John Murphy

Personal details
- Born: 28 April 1941 (age 84) Alexandria, Egypt
- Party: Liberal (1984–98); Independent (1998)

Paul John Zammit OAM (born 28 April 1941) is an Australian former politician. He was a member of the House of Representatives from 1996 to 1998, representing the seat of Lowe. He was elected as a member of the Liberal Party, but resigned from the party and unsuccessfully sought re-election as an independent at the 1998 federal election. He had previously been a Liberal member of the New South Wales Legislative Assembly from 1984 to 1996.

== Early life ==
Zammit was born into the Maltese-Egyptian community in Alexandria, Egypt, the son of a Maltese father and a Greek mother. He and his family migrated to Australia in 1955, aboard SS Strathnaver, and settled in the Sydney suburb of Punchbowl. Zammit was a businessman before entering politics.

== State politics ==
Zammit was the member for the state electorate of Burwood from 1984 to 1988. After Burwood was abolished, he was elected as the member for Strathfield at the 1988 state election. In 1991, he was made Assistant Minister to the Premier Nick Greiner and held that post when John Fahey took over as Premier in 1992.

== Federal politics ==
In 1996, Zammit stepped down from state parliament to contest the federal Division of Lowe, which he won. Zammit attracted criticism for announcing that he would seek Liberal pre-selection for Lowe a day after he had been re-elected in Strathfield. It had been understood that he would serve as the member for Strathfield for the full term. In 1998, Zammit resigned from the Liberal Party, citing dissatisfaction with the way the Howard government was dealing with the problem of aircraft noise, and contested the seat at the 1998 election as an Independent. He gained only 16% of the vote, losing to Labor's John Murphy.

New South Wales Legislative Assembly
Preceded by Phil O'Neill	Member for Burwood; 1984–1988	District abolished
New district	Member for Strathfield; 1988–1996	Succeeded by Bruce MacCarthy
Parliament of Australia
Preceded by Mary Easson	Member for Lowe; 1996–1998	Succeeded by John Murphy
