= Electoral district of Strathfield =

State electoral district of New South Wales, Australia

Strathfield New South Wales—Legislative Assembly
- Interactive map of district boundaries from the 2023 state election
- State: New South Wales
- Dates current: 1988–present
- MP: Jason Yat-Sen Li
- Party: Labor Party
- Namesake: Strathfield
- Electors: 53,451 (2019)
- Area: 22.80 km^{2} (8.8 sq mi)
- Demographic: Inner-metropolitan
Electorates around Strathfield:
Parramatta	Drummoyne	Drummoyne
Auburn	Strathfield	Summer Hill
Bankstown	Canterbury	Canterbury

Strathfield is an electoral district of the Legislative Assembly in the Australian state of New South Wales. Since a by-election in 2022, it has been represented by Jason Yat-Sen Li of the Labor Party . It was first created in 1988 and derives its name from the suburb of the same name.

Strathfield is an urban electorate, covering 19 km² in area.

== Geography ==
On its current boundaries, Strathfield takes in the suburbs of Belfield, Burwood Heights, Burwood, Croydon, Croydon Park, Enfield, Flemington, Homebush West, Strathfield, Strathfield South and parts of Ashbury, Ashfield, Campsie and Homebush.

== History ==
Strathfield was created in 1988. While traditionally a marginal electorate, Strathfield tended to favour the Liberal Party in its earlier years. It was first won by Liberal Paul Zammit, who later went on to have a short-lived career as a Liberal member of the federal House of Representatives. Zammit later contested the federal seat as an independent on the issue of airports and air traffic over the area. Zammit was succeeded by Liberal Bruce MacCarthy, who was defeated after one term. His successor, Paul Whelan, was a prominent sitting minister in the Carr government who had shifted to Strathfield from the abolished seat of Ashfield, and subsequently served as Police Minister while the member for Strathfield. The seat has tended to lean towards Labor ever since, with Whelan being succeeded by Virginia Judge. Judge lost the seat in 2011 to Liberal candidate Charles Casuscelli, but he was in turn defeated by Labor's Jodi McKay in 2015.

== Members for Strathfield ==
Member	Party	Term
Paul Zammit	Liberal	1988–1996
Bruce MacCarthy	Liberal	1996–1999
Paul Whelan	Labor	1999–2003
Virginia Judge	Labor	2003–2011
Charles Casuscelli	Liberal	2011–2015
Jodi McKay	Labor	2015–2021
Jason Yat-Sen Li	Labor	2022–present

== Election results ==
2023 New South Wales state election: Strathfield
Party	Candidate	Votes	%	±%
Labor	Jason Li	26,249	51.9	+7.1
Liberal	John-Paul Baladi	16,775	33.1	−5.4
Greens	Courtney Buckley	4,749	9.4	+0.6
Sustainable Australia	Wally Crocker	1,588	3.1	+3.1
Animal Justice	Maurie Saidi	1,257	2.5	+0.5
Total formal votes		50,618	97.1	+0.3
Informal votes		1,495	2.9	−0.3
Turnout		52,113	88.6	+0.8
Two-party-preferred result
Labor	Jason Li	30,228	63.0	+7.8
Liberal	John-Paul Baladi	17,717	37.0	−7.8
Labor hold		Swing	+7.8	

Two-party-preferred vote results in Strathfield View source data.
