= Northern Territory Trades & Labor Council =

Unions NT
- Northern Territory Trades & Labor Council
- Abbreviation: UNT
- Established: July 1, 1973; 53 years ago
- Type: Trades and labour council
- Location: 38 Woods Street, Darwin, Northern Territory
- Members: 15,000 (2025)
- President: Cath Hatcher
- Secretary: Erina Early
- Senior Vice President: David Villegas
- Treasurer: David Hayes
- Affiliations: Australian Council of Trade Unions
- Website: unionsnt.com.au

The Northern Territory Trades & Labor Council, also known as "Unions NT" is the peak body representing the interests of affiliated trade unions in the Northern Territory, Australia.

As of 2026, there are 13 unions in the Northern Territory registered as UnionsNT affiliates, representing over 15,000 members. UnionsNT is itself affiliated with the Australian Council of Trade Unions.

== Affiliate unions ==
As of 2026, the following trade unions have Northern Territory branches and/or divisions registered with Unions NT:

- Australian Education Union
- Australian Manufacturing Workers Union
- Australian Nursing and Midwifery Federation
- Australian Services Union
- United Workers Union
- Community and Public Sector Union
- Electrical Trades Union
- Rail, Tram and Bus Union
- Independent Education Union
- Maritime Union of Australia
- National Tertiary Education Union
- Finance Sector Union
- Australian Salaried Medical Officers Federation

== See also ==
- North Australian Workers' Union
- Territory Labor Party
