= Peter Nolan (trade unionist) =

Australian trade unionist

Member of the Australian Industrial Relations Commission
- In office 1984–1997
- President: Sir John Moore; Sir Barry Maddern; Deirdre O'Connor

5th Secretary of the Australian Council of Trade Unions
- In office 1977–1983
- President: Bob Hawke; Cliff Dolan
- Preceded by: Harold Souter
- Succeeded by: Bill Kelty

Assistant Secretary of the Australian Council of Trade Unions
- In office 1975–1977

Assistant Secretary of the Victorian Trades Hall Council
- In office 1971–1975

National Secretary of the Printing and Kindred Industries Union
- In office 1965–1971

Personal details
- Born: 14 June 1934 Brisbane, Queensland, Australia
- Died: 24 July 2012 (aged 78) Paynesville, Victoria, Australia
- Party: Labor
- Spouse: Sophie
- Children: 3
- Education: Ascot State School
- Occupation: Union official
- Profession: Printer

Peter Ian Nolan (14 June 1934 – 24 July 2012) was an Australian trade unionist and industrial relations official who served as the 5th secretary of the Australian Council of Trade Unions from 1977 to 1983 and an Australian Industrial Relations Commissioner from 1984 to 1997.

== Career ==
Nolan began his career as a printer in his hometown of Brisbane, before accepting a job working for The Mercury newspaper in Hobart in 1958. He joined the Printing and Kindred Industries Union, then known as the Printing Industry Employees' Union of Australia, and was eventually elected as the union's state secretary in Tasmania.

After leaving Hobart and moving to Melbourne in 1970, Nolan was made research officer for the Victorian Trades Hall Council before accepting a position with the ACTU in 1971. In 1971, Nolan became the ACTU's assistant secretary and in 1975 first assistant secretary.

He assumed the role of secretary of the ACTU in 1977 after the retirement of Harold Souter and was officially elected at the 1977 trades union congress.

Following the announcement by ACTU president Bob Hawke that he would be resigning in order to contest the 1980 Australian federal election, Nolan nominated to replace him. However, following senior vice-president Cliff Dolan's nomination for the presidency, Nolan withdrew citing the need for the ACTU executive to promote "solidarity, single-mindedness and mutual support." Cliff Dolan was successful and they served together for the next three years.

Nolan served as member of the Reserve Bank of Australia Board from 15 July 1981 to 27 August 1983.

Nolan announced in December 1982 that he would not recontest his position at the next congress and would be leaving the ACTU early in 1983. Assistant secretary Bill Kelty nominated to replace Nolan and assumed the role of secretary on his departure.

Immediately following his resignation from the ACTU, Nolan assumed a role with the Cain government in Victoria as an industrial relations advisor working directly with the Minister for Labour, Bill Landeryou.

In 1984, Nolan was appointed by the Hawke government as a commissioner of the Australian Conciliation and Arbitration Commission (in 1988 reconstituted as the Australian Industrial Relations Commission. He served in this role until his retirement in 1997.

== See also ==
- Australian labour movement
