= Gerard Dwyer =

Australian trade unionist (born 1963)

President of Union Network International
- Incumbent
- Assumed office 31 August 2023
- Preceded by: Ruben Cortina

Vice President of the ACTU
- Incumbent
- Assumed office 2017
- President: Michele O'Neil
- Preceded by: Sally McManus

National Secretary-Treasurer of the Shop, Distributive and Allied Employees' Association
- Incumbent
- Assumed office 2014
- Preceded by: Joe de Bruyn

National President of the Shop, Distributive and Allied Employees' Association
- In office 2008–2014
- Succeeded by: Joe de Bruyn

Personal details
- Born: 1963 (age 62–63) Casino, New South Wales, Australia
- Party: Labor
- Education: Australian Catholic University (BEd); University of Technology Sydney (MBus)
- Profession: Union official

Gerard Dwyer (born 1963) is an Australian trade unionist who has served as the President of Union Network International since 2023, and National Secretary-Treasurer of the Shop, Distributive and Allied Employees' Association (SDA) since 2014.

== Career ==
Dwyer was first employed by the SDA as an organiser in 1987, originally on a temporary contract. He was elected secretary-treasurer of the New South Wales branch in 2005 and national president in 2008. He served in both positions until his nomination to replace Joe de Bruyn as national secretary-treasurer in 2014.

He was appointed Vice President of the Australian Council of Trade Unions in 2017. In 2020 he was appointed as an Alternate Director of the superannuation fund Rest Super.

In 2023, Dwyer was elected President of the Union Network International at the UNI World Congress in Philadelphia.

Dwyer is active in Australian Labor Party politics, serving as a member of the National Executive and is a prominent member of the Labor Right faction. He is also a director of the Labor Party-aligned Thinktank the John Curtin Research Centre.

Dwyer is also a member of the Australian Government's Ministerial Advisory Board on Skilled Migration, with his term due to expire in June 2027. He was previously a member of the National Workplace Relations Consultative Council, serving from 2022 to 2024.

== Personal life ==
Born in the town of Casino, New South Wales in 1963, Dwyer's family was firmly unionist. His uncle once ran as a state Labor candidate and his grandfather was a union delegate at a butter factory. He studied education at Australian Catholic University, working as a teacher and social worker before beginning his career as a union official.
