= Melissa Donnelly =

Australian trade unionist

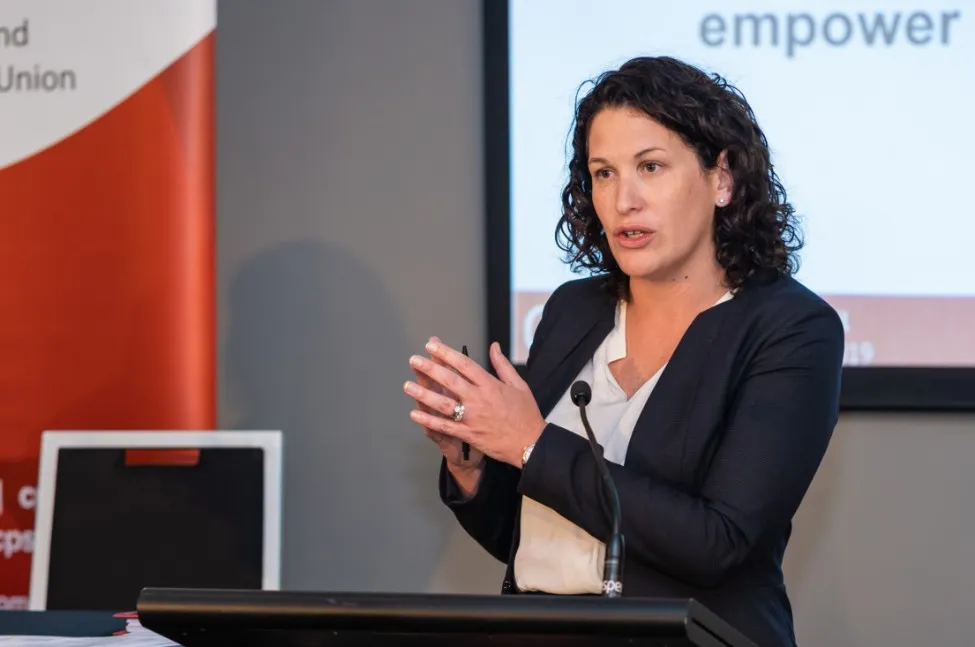
- Donnelly in 2024 as National Secretary of the CPSU

11th Secretary of the ACTU
- Incumbent
- Assumed office 28 August 2026
- President: Michele O'Neil
- Preceded by: Sally McManus

National Secretary of the Community and Public Sector Union
- In office 2019–2026
- President: Beth Vincent-Pietsch
- Preceded by: Nadine Flood

Personal details
- Born: 1982 (age 43–44)
- Party: Labor
- Education: Macquarie University (LLB)
- Occupation: Union official
- Profession: Lawyer

Melissa Donnelly (born 1982) is an Australian trade unionist currently serving as the secretary of the Australian Council of Trade Unions (ACTU). Prior to assuming her role with the ACTU, Donnelly was the National Secretary of the Community and Public Sector Union (CPSU).

== Career ==
Donnelly was the CPSU's youngest ever national secretary, as well as the third woman and the first working mother to hold the role.

Donnelly was first elevated to the role, following tenure in the union's legal and industrial relations team and its Executive Committee, when former National Secretary Nadine Flood resigned for health reasons in 2019. Donnelly was reelected to the position in December 2023.

Following the COVID-19 pandemic, Donnelly was responsible for championing a "groundbreaking" Work from home deal with the Australian Public Sector Commission in 2023 which allows public sector employees to seek unlimited working from home flexibility arrangements.

Donnelly was elected unopposed as secretary of the ACTU following the resignation of Sally McManus in August 2026.

Donnelly has served as a member of the Australian Labor Party National Executive since 2023.
