= Sally McManus =

Australian trade unionist

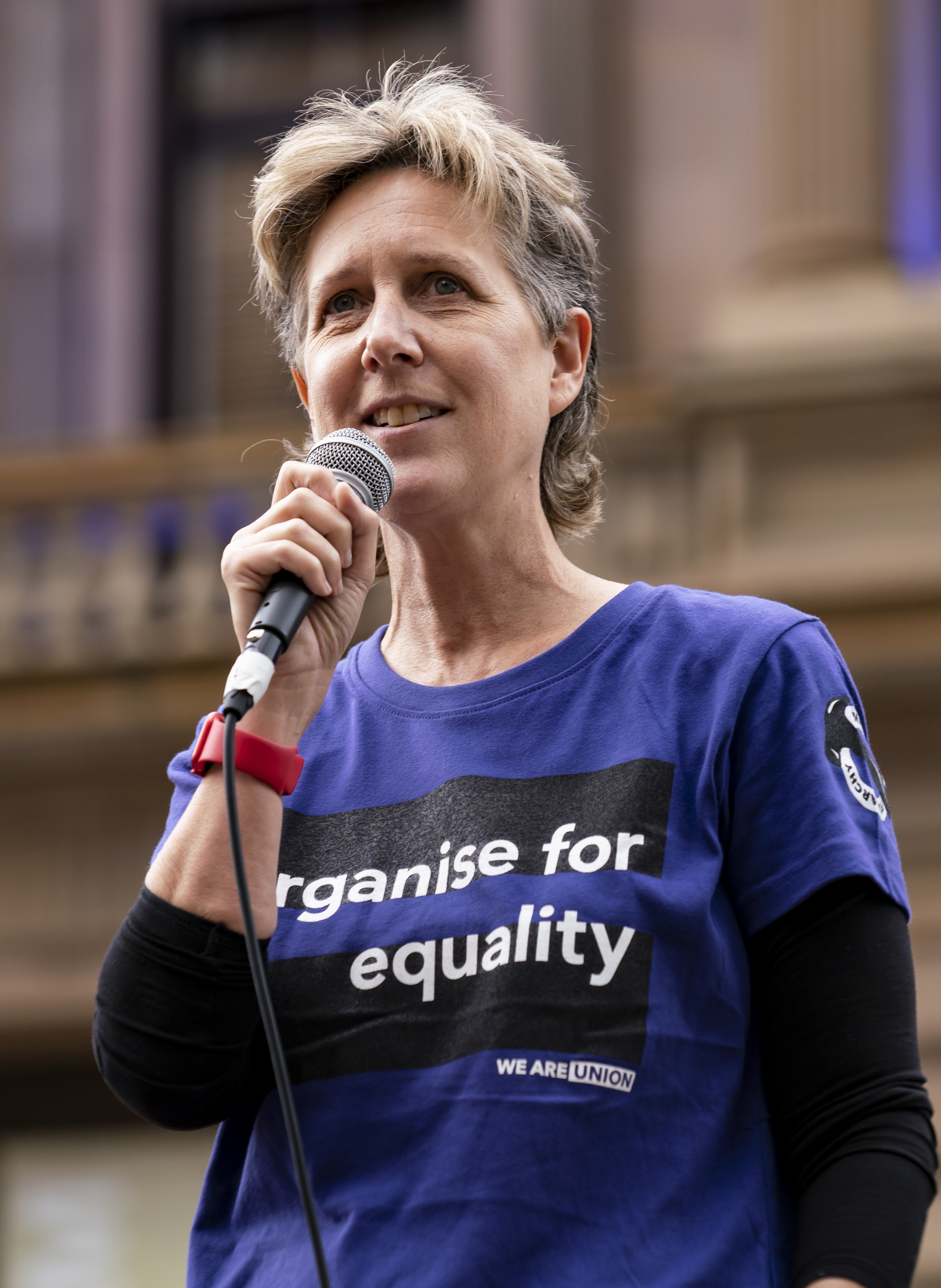
- McManus in March 2022

10th Secretary of the ACTU
- In office 15 March 2017 – 28 August 2026
- President: Ged Kearney; Michele O'Neil
- Preceded by: Dave Oliver
- Succeeded by: Melissa Donnelly

Vice-President of the ACTU
- In office 2015–2017
- President: Ged Kearney
- Succeeded by: Gerard Dwyer

Secretary of the Australian Services Union NSW/ACT
- In office 2004–2015
- Preceded by: Kristyn Crossfield
- Succeeded by: Natalie Lang

Assistant Secretary of the Australian Services Union NSW/ACT
- In office 2003–2004
- Preceded by: George Panageris
- Succeeded by: Naomi Arrowsmith

Personal details
- Born: 31 July 1971 (age 55) Sydney, Australia
- Party: Labor
- Education: Carlingford High School; Macquarie University (BA)

Sally McManus (born 31 July 1971) is an Australian trade unionist, feminist and political activist who has served as the Secretary of the Australian Council of Trade Unions (ACTU) since 2017. She is the first woman to hold the position of Secretary in the ACTU's 90-year history. Prior to becoming Secretary she served as a vice president and Campaigns Director.

Before joining the ACTU, McManus was the Branch Secretary and an organiser with the Australian Services Union (ASU) in NSW and the ACT.

She has led many campaigns in the private, public and community sectors, including the first collective agreement for IBM workers anywhere in the world, the anti-privatisation campaign at Sydney Water, as well as the equal pay campaign for community workers. This was a seven-year campaign that delivered pay increases of between 18 and 40 per cent for all workers, the vast majority of whom were women.

== Early life and background ==
McManus grew up in Carlingford, New South Wales, Australia. She has two younger brothers. At the age of 16, McManus was first involved in union activity when she joined with other students supporting a teachers' strike protest against mass teacher lay-offs by the Greiner Liberal state government in 1988.

== Education ==
McManus went to Carlingford High School and studied for a Bachelor of Arts in philosophy at Macquarie University. At 19, McManus was elected president of the Macquarie University Union. She instituted a ban on smoking in the university bar and banned single-use plastics on campus. Former Deputy Labor Leader, Tanya Plibersek knew McManus during their time at University.

== Career ==
McManus started work when she was 13 and worked as a shop assistant, Pizza Hut driver, cleaner and call centre worker prior to joining the ACTU's Trainee Organisers Program in 1994, its first year. From there, she became an Organiser for the Australian Services Union, focusing on workers in call centres and the IT sector. In 2004 she became Branch Secretary of the ASU in NSW and the ACT and oversaw membership grow from 9500 to 12,003.

In 2012, McManus founded the Destroy The Joint campaign formed in response to radio broadcaster Alan Jones' criticism of then Prime Minister Julia Gillard and other prominent women. Her activism was recognised in 2015 when she received an Edna Ryan Award in the Grand Stirrer category.

In 2015, McManus moved to the ACTU as vice-president and Campaigns Director and was ultimately elected ACTU Secretary two years later.

Her first television interview as Secretary sparked controversy, when McManus refused to back down from the use of illegal industrial action as a method of union campaigning. Asked by presenter Leigh Sales, on the ABC's news and current affairs program 7.30, if the ACTU would distance itself from such action, McManus responded "There is no way we'll be doing that," later adding "I believe in the rule of law when the law is fair and the law is right, but when it's unjust I don't think there's a problem with breaking it." The statement was widely condemned by business and industry groups, as well as then Liberal Prime Minister Malcolm Turnbull, who said he was unlikely to work with her.

In February 2019, her book On Fairness was published by Melbourne University Publishing.

In June 2019, McManus called for the resignation of CFMMEU Victorian state secretary John Setka, after he stated he was pleading guilty to domestic violence charges.

Prior to the 2019 federal election, McManus led the union movement's "Change the Rules" campaign, which pushed for workplace rights. Rallies were held across the country, with worker and supporter turn-outs reaching over 200,000 across the country.

During the COVID-19 pandemic in Australia McManus led the successful ACTU campaign for a national wage subsidy scheme, negotiating with the Morrison government to secure the JobKeeper wage subsidy, and campaigned for paid pandemic leave.

In 2026, McManus announced that she would resign as secretary of the ACTU at the end of August. Secretary of the Community and Public Sector Union (CPSU) Melissa Donnelly has been announced as the next secretary of the ACTU.

== Other activities ==
McManus has a third share in UComms, a market research and opinion polling company, being a non-beneficiary shareholder of the company on behalf of the union.

== Personal life ==
McManus is an enthusiastic player of computer games, likes a drink, and describes herself as "the definition of a total gamer", who has been playing since the DOS era. She particularly enjoys Metal Gear Solid on PlayStation, and says her favourite of all is Civilization. McManus has a black belt in kung-fu and taekwondo. She is also a keen bird watcher and photographer.

McManus is a foundation member of both the Western Sydney Wanderers and Greater Western Sydney Giants as well as being a long-term supporter of the Parramatta Eels.

Her portrait titled McManusstan by Joanna Braithwaite was a finalist in the 2022 Archibald Prize.
