= FAAA =

FAAA may refer to:

- Flight Attendants' Association of Australia
- Failure Analysis Associates (FaAA)
- Fellow of the American Association for Anatomy

== See also ==
- Faʻaʻā, a commune in the suburbs of Papeete in French Polynesia
