= Net Zero Economy Authority =

Australian Government statutory authority

The Net Zero Economy Authority (NZEA) is a statutory authority of the Australian Government. It was founded as Net Zero Economy Agency in July 2023, before being enshrined in legislation in the Net Zero Economy Authority Act 2024 in September 2024. Its main role is to advise the government on how best to support communities through the transition to net-zero emissions in Australia, and to provide practical support to communities, particularly regional workers, are affected by the transition.

== Background ==
Australia is transitioning to net zero emissions owing to the threat that climate change and global warming poses to the nation and the Earth. This means a major economic transformation, with the shift from coal and gas-fired power stations powering homes and industries towards renewable energy such as wind and solar energy. These bring the need for new skills, especially in regional areas.

== History of the NZEA ==
In October 2022 a Net Zero Economy Taskforce was established within the Department of the Prime Minister and Cabinet (PM&C) to advise the government on how best to support communities through the transition to net-zero emissions in Australia. Consultation with a number of groups, including various levels of governments, First Nations groups, unions, industry, and NGOs ensued, leading the taskforce to conclude that there should be a national authority to plan, coordinate, and mobilise action across government in support of regions and workers.

On 5 May 2023 Prime Minister Anthony Albanese announced that the government would pass legislation to establish the body. On 1 July 2023 the Governor-General of Australia, Sam Mostyn, established the Net Zero Economy Agency as an executive agency within the prime minister's portfolio, to provide advice on the final design of the authority and to commence as the responsible body in the interim period. The Net Zero Economy Authority Bill 2024 and Net Zero Economy Authority (Transitional Provisions) Bill 2024 were developed by the Agency in consultation with the Office of Parliamentary Counsel, and introduced into the House of Representatives on 27 March 2024.

On 14 June 2023 a media release by the prime minister and the Minister for Climate Change and Energy announced the appointment of Greg Combet as chair of the Net Zero Economy Agency, beginning on 10 July 2023. An advisory board comprising 10 other people was also established, including Ross Garnaut and Robynne Quiggin, and it was intended to also establish stakeholder reference groups.

On 1 June 2024 former Federal Court judge Iain Ross was appointed acting chair of the Net Zero Economy Agency, replacing outgoing chair Greg Combet, and to be the inaugural chair of the Net Zero Economy Authority. An independent board would be appointed following legislation being passed to establish the authority, and an open recruitment process for the CEO would be advertised The Government provided a $209.3 million for the work of the authority in the 2024-25 Budget.

Following debate, and consideration by the Senate's Finance and Public Administration Legislation Committee, the bills were passed by both Houses of Parliament and received Royal Assent on 5 September and 17 September 2024 respectively. On 11 December 2024 the Net Zero Economy Authority was formally established as an independent statutory body with a focused remit and distinct responsibilities by the Net Zero Economy Authority Act 2024. This enabled a board and CEO to be appointed.

== Description, governance, and functions ==
The Net Zero Economy Authority (NZEA) is a non-corporate Commonwealth entity. David Shankey was appointed CEO on December 2024. As of October 2026 the board members are:

- Iain Ross (chair)
- Michele O'Neil, president of the Australian Council of Trade Unions
- Anthony Maher, former general president of the Mining and Energy Union
- Anna Skarbek, CEO at Climateworks Centre, founding director of the Clean Energy Finance Corporation
- Robynne Quiggin, pro-vice-chancellor, Indigenous Leadership and Engagement at the University of Technology Sydney
- Zoe Whitton, chair of the Centre for Policy Development and a director of the Investor Group on Climate Change
- Mike Mrdak, former public servant, chair of the Airports Development Group, a director of NBN Co and the Western Sydney Airport

According to the Act, the aims of the NZEA are to:

- promote an orderly and positive economic transformation as the world decarbonises
- facilitate the achievement of Australia's greenhouse gas emissions reduction targets
- ensure Australia's regions, communities, and workers are supported to manage the impacts and share the benefits of Australia's transition to a net zero emissions economy

Its work includes supporting workers in emissions-intensive industries to access new employment or acquire skills to improve their employment prospects. The Energy Industry Jobs Plan assists workers affected by closing coal and gas-fired power stations transition to new jobs, in practical ways. The NZEA supports both public and private sector participation and investment in emissions reduction and net-zero transformation projects across Australia. Its focus is on supporting communities to participate in, and benefit from, the economic shift to net zero emissions. The Act also provides that the authority is to be governed by a board with a diverse range of expertise and experience from areas such as industry, regional development, the union movement, First Nations community leadership and advocacy, and investment.
