= State Public Service Federation =

CPSU (SPSF Group)
- CPSU, the Community and Public Sector Union (PSU & SPSF Groups)
- Founded: 30 July 1976
- Headquarters: Haymarket, Sydney; Exhibition Street, Melbourne
- Location: Australia
- Members: 100,000
- Key people: Nadine Flood (PSU) and Karen Batt (SPSF), Joint National Secretaries
- Affiliations: ACTU
- Website: CPSU (SPSF Group)

The State Public Services Federation (SPSF Group) is a federation of trade unions each of which covers members in the public service of an Australian state and related employment. The combined total of membership of the Federation is around 100,000.

The CPSU (SPSF Group) is a component part of the CPSU, the Community and Public Sector Union, the other being the CPSU (PSU Group). See Rules 5(d)-(f) of the Chapter A Rules.

The component unions of the CPSU (SPSF Group) consist of branches in each State and where applicable their Associated Body, being the state registered counterpart to the Branch. See Rule 5(c) of the Chapter A Rules.

The CPSU (SPSF Group) Branches and Associated Bodies are:

- New South Wales – CPSU (SPSF Group) New South Wales Branch (CPSU NSW) and Public Service Association of New South Wales (PSA NSW)
- Queensland – CPSU (SPSF Group) QLD Branch and Queensland Public Sector Union (QPSU), now part of Together in 2011
- South Australia – CPSU (SPSF Group) South Australian Branch and Public Service Association of South Australia (CPSU SA / PSA SA) with members subject to the Professional and Administrative Enterprise Agreement.
- Tasmania – CPSU (SPSF Group) Tasmanian Branch and The Community and Public Sector Union (State Public Services Federation Tasmania) INC (SPSFT)
- Victoria – Community and Public Sector Union Victoria (CPSU Victoria), with members subject to the Victorian Public Service Enterprise Agreement 2024.
- Western Australia – CPSU (SPSF Group) Western Australian Branch and Civil Service Association of Western Australia (CPSU/CSA)
- Western Australia – CPSU (SPSF Group) Western Australian Prison Officers' Union Branch and Western Australian Prison Officers' Union of Workers
