= Printing and Kindred Industries Union =

PKIU
- Printing and Kindred Industries Union
- Merged into: Australian Manufacturing Workers Union
- Founded: 6 July 1966; 60 years ago
- Dissolved: January 1995; 31 years ago
- Headquarters: 377 Sussex St, Sydney
- Location: Australia
- Members: 60,000 (1970)
- Publication: Printing Trades Journal
- Affiliations: ALP, ACTU, International Chemical Federation

The Printing and Kindred Industries Union (PKIU) was an Australian trade union which existed between 1966 and 1995. It represented production workers in the printing industry, including compositing, typesetting, letterpress printing, lithographic plate-making, electrotyping, stereotyping and bookbinding, and the manufacture of paper and cardboard products, such as paper bags, envelopes, cardboard boxes and cartons. Approximately half of all members were qualified tradespeople, with the remainder semi-skilled or unskilled workers.

As in many other printing trade unions, the union members in each workplace were known as the 'Chapel', and the senior union delegate as the 'Father of the Chapel', while other elected officials were referred to as 'brothers'.

== History ==
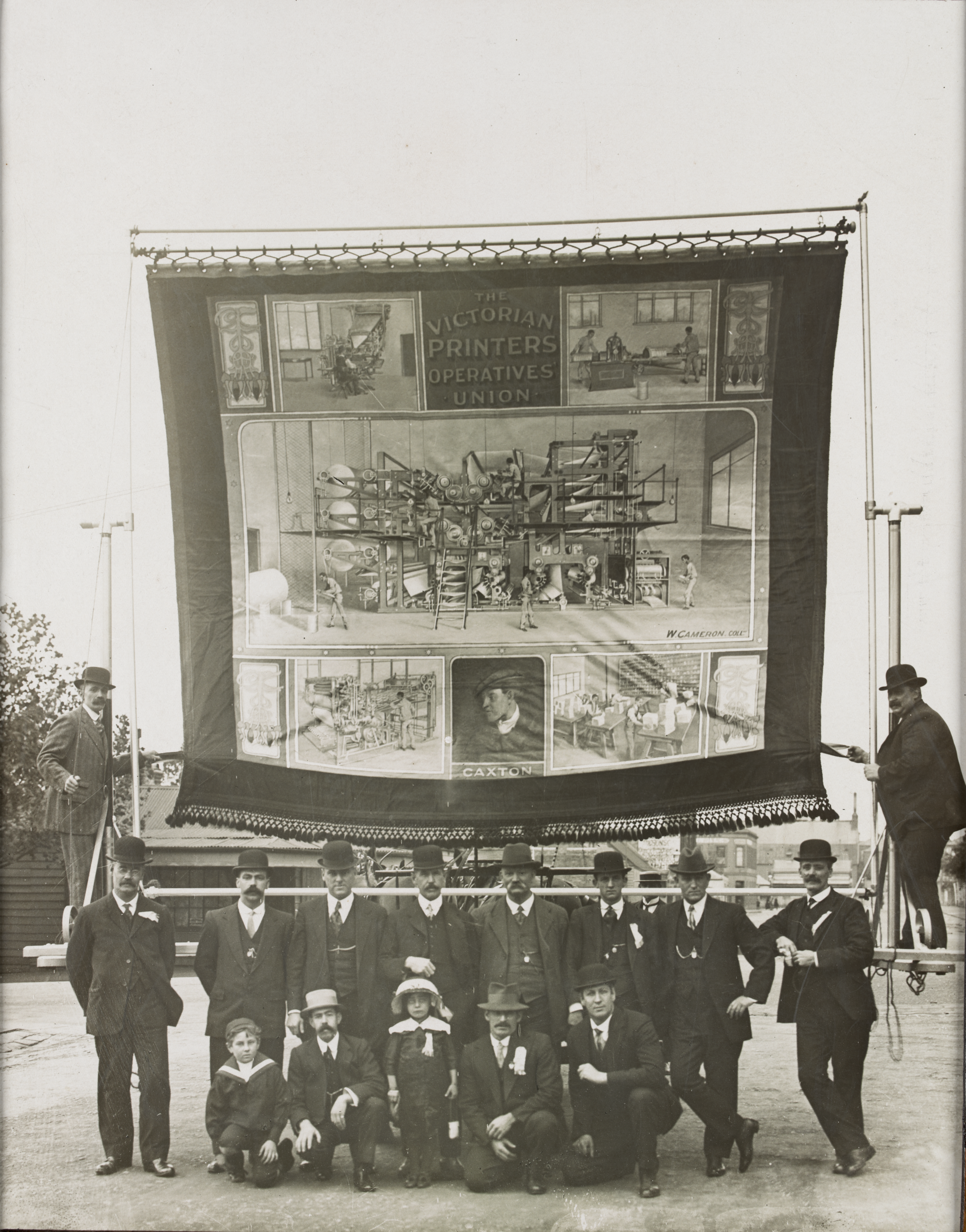
Members of the Victorian Printers Operative Union, circa 1900

The PKIU was formed on 6 July 1966 through the amalgamation of the Printing Industries Employees Union of Australia (PIEU) and the Australian Printing Trades Employees' Union (APTEU). At its formation the PKIU represented 50,000 members, out of a total of 53,000 unionists in the Australian printing industry, making it the sixth largest union in Australia and the eighth largest printing union in the English-speaking world. Membership of the union increased to a peak of 60,000 in 1970. After this, membership entered a gradual decline as technological change in the printing industry reduced the number of jobs, with membership falling back to 50,000 by the end of the decade. In 1976 the union held an eight-and-a-half-week strike against John Fairfax and Sons over the introduction of computerised typesetting equipment.

By the 1970s the union had established 100 percent membership in the newspaper section of the industry, and approximately 75 percent membership in the paper products sections.

In 1986 the PKIU absorbed the Federated Photo Engravers, Photo-Lithographers and Photogravure Employees' Association of Australia, which had been active since 1910 as a small union of skilled workers in South Australian and Victorian newspaper offices. First registered federally in 1942 as the Federated Process Engravers, Photo-Lithographers and Photogravure Employees' Association of Australia, it changed its name to the Federated Photo Engravers, Photo-Lithographers and Photogravure Employees' Association of Australia in 1952. In 1992 the PKIU also absorbed the Victorian Printers Operatives' Union (VPOU). The VPOU had been registered in 1987, but existed well before this date as the Printing Trades General Workers' Union.

By 1992 membership had declined to 43,000 and three years later the PKIU amalgamated with the Automotive, Food, Metals and Engineering Union to become the printing division of the Australian Manufacturing Workers Union.
