= Public Service Association of NSW =

Australian public sector trade union

PSA of NSW
- Public Service Association of NSW
- Founded: 1899
- Headquarters: 160 Clarence Street, Sydney
- Location: Australia
- Members: 40,000
- Key people: Stewart Little, General Secretary, Troy Wright, Assistant General Secretary and Nicole Jess, President
- Affiliations: UnionsNSW
- Website: psa.asn.au

The Public Service Association of NSW (PSA) is a union which covers employees in the government, university and related public sector in New South Wales. The union is registered under New South Wales state legislation and is affiliated with the Labor Council of New South Wales.

For constitutional and legal reasons, the union has not fully integrated with the Community and Public Sector Union, which is a national union registered under Commonwealth legislation, of which it is classified as an "Associated Body". Members of the PSA are also members of the CPSU. The Association is also a member of the State Public Service Federation Group of the CPSU.

== History ==
The first attempt to form the Association was made in April 1886 by Arthur Josling and P.H. Somerville. Their actions may have been prompted by similar moves in Victoria and by growing concerns of political patronage within the service.

The Provisional Committee set up to establish the organisation stated that the Association would not have a political character nor would it be a trade union. Thirteen years passed before the union was established in 1899.

The first edition of the Association's newspaper, The Public Service Journal, appeared on 4 January 1900 and carried the historic story of public servants meeting to consider the union's draft constitution. The Chairman, Mr. Beauer, Clerk of the Peace, in addressing the meeting said,

"... though we have a loyal and faithful service, we must have a fearless service. I mean a service which will not be spineless, or a cringing, craving service, which is always indicative of that which is wrong, because ultimately they would find that a service which dare not express its views in a reasonable and proper manner, and dare not ask for what was legitimately its rights, was bound, more or less, to be a menace to the State."

The constitution was then submitted to the Premier, George Reid and the Public Service Board. Both parties approved its contents. The Association's first Chairman was Mr. Cornelius Delohery with Mr. W.A. Thomson elected Secretary.

In October 1900, the first country branch was formed at Moree. Others quickly followed in Armidale, Goulburn, Hay, Newcastle, Forbes and Orange. In November of the same year, Mr. John Osbourne was appointed as the first permanent Secretary and the first Council was elected to conduct the business of the PSA.

In 1908, the industrial arbitration system was established in NSW. The PSA was not only excluded from that system but had its membership of approximately 3,300 fragmented by the creation of other unions such as the railways and teachers.

In 1910, the PSA conducted its first major campaign covering equal pay, superannuation and conditions.

In 1915, it had to be decided whether to register as a trade union under the Industrial Arbitration and Trade Union Acts. The proposal fired spirited debate but a referendum resulted in 670 members supporting registration with 538 votes cast in opposition. The PSA subsequently became registered as a trade union under the Trade Union Act and an industrial union under the Industrial Arbitration Act. Four internal divisions were established – Clerical, General, Professional and Education.

By 1920, a vocational structure was emerging – the division and representation of members by the jobs they did. The women's clerical sub-section had been formed the year before by Dorothy Beveridge who would later serve as its secretary and President.

The PSA's first awards were lodged in 1920.

In 1922, new legislation again excluded the PSA from the arbitration system. In an attempt to correct this situation the PSA waged a major political campaign between 1925 and 1930 to regain access to the system. The Lang Labor Government eventually amended the legislation. Four sections then emerged – Clerical, General, Professional and Government Agencies – plus a Women's Auxiliary.

In 1927 the PSA negotiated the first clerical award for women employees of the New South Wales government. In the same year the Association changed the name of its newspaper from The Public Service Journal to Red Tape in July.

The first woman to serve on the association's executive was Kathleen Clare O'Keefe was appointed in 1929. She had assisted with the 1927 women's award; served on the clerical management and arbitration committees and she chaired the PSA's women's auxiliary. Two years later she campaigned for amendments to the 1902 Public Service Act to include equal pay for women.

During the Great Depression years – 1930 to 1945 – the Association fought a rearguard action to protect members and conducted campaigns to maintain jobs. In October 1937 the Industrial Arbitration (Amendment) Act increased the basic salary to £3 16s per week. However this was only for men and the act actually cut the wages of women by two shillings to just a shilling over two pounds a week. O'Keefe, Dorothy Beveridge and others lobbied to have women who were qualified public servants to be given permanent and not temporary contracts. While job losses were minimised, the State Government slashed public servant salaries and raided the resources of the State Superannuation Fund.

It was years before the Association was able to restore pre-depression salaries and it was not until 1944 that the State Government repaid the money taken from the Superannuation Fund.

In 1944, the Crown Employees' Appeal Board was established. The creation of the body was one of the PSA's earliest objectives.

Somewhere between 1948 and 1953, the PSA affiliated with the Labor Council of New South Wales, now known as UnionsNSW.

== Presidents ==
Year	Name	Department
1899	Delohery, Cornelius J	Justice
1900	Turner, J W	Education
1901	Turner, J W (to May 1902)	Education
1902	McKay, G A (to Sept 1902)	Lands
1902–1903	Vautin, Ernest Stafford	Lands
1904	Williams, Percy E	Chief Secretary
1905	Brownlow, Frederick Hugh	Mines
1906	Kilminster, George	Education
1907	D'Arcy, John Synott BA	Navigation
1908	Paton, Alfred	Lands
1909–1912	D'Arcy, John Synott BA	Navigation
1913–1914	Beavis, Walter William Keen	Education
1915–1916	D'Arcy, John Synott BA	Navigation
1916–1918	Watson, Albert Alexander	Lands
1919–1920	Kilminster, George	Education
1920–1921	Watson, Albert Alexander	Lands
1922	Greig, William Arthur	Mines
1923	McCulloch, J E (resigned Dec 1923)	Justice
1924	Trollope, Arthur John	Public Works
1925–1927	Watson, Albert Alexander	Lands
1928–1932	Flynn, William Augustus	Justice
1933–1935	Hodge-Smith, Thomas	Education
1936–1938	Weir, George LB	Justice
1939–1941	Drummond, C (Barrister-at-Law)	Lands
1942–1945	Trout, Albert John	Public trust
1946–1949	Hedges, Frederick, L	Agriculture
1950–1951	Johnstone, N P S	Lands
1952–1963	Hook, F A	Public Works
1964–1966	Solomans, L W	Housing
1967–1975	Hillyard, A G (Bert)	Meat Board
1975–1979	Finnane, T J MBE ED	Electricity Commission
1979–1981	Jardine, Brian S, PhD BA	Egg Marketing Board
1981–1985	Brown, E John	Health Commission
1985–1987	Naylor, Paul E	Central Mapping Authority
1987–1989	Good, Janet P, BBus.ALA.	TAFE
1989–1991	Armstrong Patrick	Corrective Services
1991–1993	Good, Janet P, BBus.ALA	TAFE
1993–2000	O'Sullivan, Maurie	Community Services
2000–2016	Walsh, Suzanne	Education
2016–2021	McKelvie, Kylie	Corrective Services
2021–present	Jess, Nicole	Corrective Services

== Secretaries and General Secretaries ==
Year	Name
1900–1908	Osborne, John
1909–1912	Hill, E.J.
1912–1914	Peek, R
1914–1931	Wills, F
1931–1932	Irving, C.C
1932–1945	O'Sullivan, E
1945–1959	O'Neile, R.J
1959–1966	Sutherland, R.J
1966–1971	Nicholls, Eric J
1971–1985	Hammond, Geoffrey B
1986–1989	Twohill, Helen
1989–1993	Gibson, Allan
1993–2000	Good, Janet, BBUS, ALA
2000–2003	O'Sullivan, Maurie, BA
2003–2012	Cahill, John
2012–2016	Gardiner, Anne
2016–present	Little, Stewart

== Assistant General Secretaries ==
Year	Name
2012–2014	Turner, Steve
2016–present	Wright, Troy
