= Dave Oliver (trade unionist) =

Australian trade unionist

- Oliver in 2007

9th Secretary of the Australian Council of Trade Unions
- In office 24 May 2012 – 15 March 2017
- President: Ged Kearney
- Preceded by: Jeff Lawrence
- Succeeded by: Sally McManus

National Secretary of the Australian Manufacturing Workers Union
- In office 2007–2012
- Preceded by: Doug Cameron
- Succeeded by: Paul Bastian

Personal details
- Born: 1963 (age 62–63)
- Party: Labor
- Profession: Union official

David "Dave" Oliver (born 1963) is an Australian trade unionist who served as the ninth secretary of the Australian Council of Trade Unions from 2012 to 2017. Prior to his election to replace Jeff Lawrence as the most senior executive at the ACTU, Oliver served as national secretary of the Australian Manufacturing Workers Union (AMWU).

== Career ==
Oliver began his career when he left school at the end of year 10 to become an apprentice fitter and turner for a small engineering firm. He later worked as a lift mechanic and a health and safety officer before joining the ACTU as an organiser in 1988 at age 25. He assumed the role of assistant national secretary of the AMWU in 1996, and was installed as administrator of the Victorian branch in 2000, becoming the state secretary in 2002. He served in this role until 2007 when he was elected national secretary, succeeding Doug Cameron.

Oliver was appointed as a director of superannuation fund AustralianSuper in 2007 and was elevated to the position of deputy chair in 2014 following the resignation of Paul Howes.

Following an announcement in March 2012 by ACTU secretary Jeff Lawrence that he would not seek another three-year term, Oliver nominated for the position and was elected unopposed.

In the lead up to the 2015 ACTU national congress, Oliver's assistant secretary Tim Lyons announced he would challenge Oliver for his position as secretary. Lyons' challenge was ultimately unsuccessful, and Oliver was re-elected.

He announced his resignation as ACTU secretary in January 2017, a year before his second 3-year term was due to expire. He cited a "need for renewal" within the ACTU and "a desire to spend more time with his family".

In 2024, Oliver was appointed by the Albanese government to the Commonwealth Safety, Rehabilitation and Compensation Commission and continues to serve in this position.
