= Reg Broadby =

Australian trade unionist

3rd Secretary of the Australian Council of Trade Unions
- In office 1949–1956
- President: Albert Monk
- Preceded by: Albert Monk
- Succeeded by: Harold Souter

President of the Victorian Labor Party
- In office 1949–1950

President of the Melbourne Trades Hall Council
- In office 1944–1945

Personal details
- Born: Reginald Roslyn Broadby; June 25, 1904 Queenstown, Tasmania, Australia
- Died: July 14, 1956 (aged 52) Williamstown, Victoria, Australia
- Resting place: Fawkner Memorial Park, Hadfield, Victoria
- Party: Labor
- Spouse: Ellen Enright (m. 1925)
- Children: 3
- Occupation: Union official

Reginald Roslyn "Reg" Broadby (25 June 1904 – 14 July 1956) was an Australian trade unionist who served as the Secretary of the Australian Council of Trade Unions from 1949 until his death in 1956.

== Early life ==
Reginald Broadby was born on 25 June 1904 at Queenstown, Tasmania, son of Reginald and Ruby Broadby. He was educated at Queenstown State School, moved to Melbourne in 1925 and in December that year married Ellen Enright at the Catholic Church of Saints Peter and Paul.

== Union official ==
Broadby became a tram conductor in 1926. Forced into part-time work by the Depression, he became an active member of the Australian Tramway and Motor Omnibus Employees' Association. He later worked for the union, becoming the general secretary and arbitration advocate in 1944, serving until 1948. Additionally, he served as Victorian state president from 1944 to 1946. He also served as an industrial organiser for the Australian Red Cross Society during World War II.

Broadby was also president of the Melbourne Trades Hall Council from 1944 to 1945, and president of the Victorian branch of the Australian Labor Party from 1949 to 1950.

== ACTU and the ALP split ==
In 1948 the interstate executive of the Australian Council of Trade Unions chose Broadby ahead of the communist candidate for the position of assistant secretary, with Broadby succeeding by just one vote. In 1949 he was elected secretary, succeeding Albert Monk who became president.

At first Broadby was an influential supporter of the ALP industrial groups, which was formed to combat the influence of communism in Australian unions. He had been secretary of the ALP industrial groups committee.

By the early 1950s, Broadby and a number of other senior Labor officials had turned against the anti-communist force and formed a new centrist faction, believing that the anti-communist 'groupers' were becoming too disruptive. This faction, with Broadby among its leaders, supported the 'anti-grouper' side in the Labor split of 1955 and he returned to the Victorian central executive of the ALP.

He died of asthma complicated by bronchiectasis on 14 July 1956 at Williamstown, Victoria. His obituary described him as "one of the most popular in the Australian trade union movement."

== See also ==
- Australian Labor Party split of 1955
- B. A. Santamaria
- Australian Labor Party (Anti-Communist)
