= Harold Souter =

Australian trade unionist

Harold Souter AO

4th Secretary of the Australian Council of Trade Unions
- In office 1956–1977
- President: Albert Monk; Bob Hawke
- Preceded by: Reg Broadby
- Succeeded by: Bill Kelty

Personal details
- Born: Harold James Souter; October 2, 1911 Adelaide, South Australia, Australia
- Died: October 19, 1994 (aged 83) Melbourne, Victoria, Australia
- Party: Labor
- Spouse: Kathleen May Stanford (m. 1934)
- Children: 3
- Education: Sturt Street Public School; Adelaide Technical High School
- Occupation: Union official
- Profession: Fitter and turner

Harold James Souter (2 October 1911 – 19 October 1994) was an Australian trade unionist who was the longest-serving secretary of the Australian Council of Trade Unions. He held the office for 21 years between 1956 and 1977.

== Early life ==
Souter was born in Adelaide, South Australia to Harry Souter, a painter, and his wife Martha Standley. He attended Sturt Street Public School and later Adelaide Technical School, training as a fitter and turner. He found a steady machinist job working at the General Motors-Holden assembly plant in Birkenhead.

== Career ==
At the age of 28, while working in the maintenance section of the South Australian Railways, Souter became an assistant organiser for the Amalgamated Engineering Union (AEU), rising to the position of Adelaide district secretary in 1941. He moved to Melbourne after World War II and took up a position as the AEU's arbitration officer, representing the union for the next seven years to the Commonwealth Court of Conciliation and Arbitration.

In 1954, Souter was appointed as the ACTU's first ever research officer, a position that aimed to keep the trade union movement up-to-date on issues impacting working conditions, compile reports for publication and provide advice to union officials.

Souter was appointed acting secretary of the ACTU in 1956, following the death of the previous secretary, Reg Broadby. At the ACTU Congress the following year, Souter's permanent appointment to the role was confirmed without challenge.

On the announcement that long-serving ACTU President Albert Monk would retire in 1969, Souter nominated to stand for the presidency. His opponent was Bob Hawke, the man who replaced him as research officer 13 years earlier. Although Souter had garnered a reputation for being a diligent and ethical administrator, he ultimately lost to Hawke 399 votes to 350. He garnered the support of the Federated Ironworkers' Association of Australia due to his steadfast support for grassroots members and reluctance to give complete support to the ALP. The campaign for the presidency was very strongly contested between the two camps, at times spilling over into public condemnation of each other. Despite losing the election for the presidency, Souter continued in his role as secretary and formed a positive working relationship with Hawke.

He garnered some controversy towards the end of his career, being publicly accused of misleading a federal government minister over a deal involving ACTU-Solo Enterprises Pty Ltd, a union-owned petroleum company.

He served on a number of government boards and advisory committees, including the Australian Broadcasting Control Board (1974–75) and the Australian National Airlines Commission (1974–75). He retired from the ACTU in 1977 after a record 21 years as secretary.

== Honours ==
- 9 June 1975 | Member of the Order of Australia (AM) | For service to the trade union movement
- 26 January 1988 | Officer of the Order of Australia (AO) | For service to the trade union movement
