= Breweries & Bottleyards Employees Industrial Union of Workers WA =

BBEIUW (WA)
- Breweries & Bottleyards Employees Industrial Union of Workers WA
- Headquarters: Canning Vale, Western Australia
- Location: Australia
- Members: 55 (as at 31 December 2024)
- Key people: Bob Bunce, president
- Affiliations: ACTU

The Breweries & Bottleyards Employees Industrial Union of Workers WA (BBEIUW (WA)) is a trade union in Australia. It is affiliated with the Australian Council of Trade Unions.
