= Dorothy Beveridge =

Australian public servant (1894-1978)

Dorothy Beveridge MBE
- Born: Dorothy Christina Beveridge; 21 November 1894; Paddington, Sydney
- Died: 24 November 1978 (aged 84); Mosman, Sydney
- Education: Sydney Girls High School
- Occupation: public servant
- Known for: work with the Public Service Association of NSW

Dorothy Christina Beveridge (21 November 1894 – 24 November 1978) was an Australian public servant. She was an important worker with the Public Service Association of NSW becoming the president of its women's clerical sub-section.

== Life ==
Beveridge was born in 1894 in the Sydney suburb of Paddington. Her mother's was named Matilda and she was born Matilda MacConaghy in Sydney. Her father, Robert Christopher Beveridge, was an accountant and he was a British immigrant. She went to Metropolitan Business College after she completed school at Sydney Girls High School. Her first job was at the Public Service Association of NSW (PSA) before she joined the Department of Public Works as a typist.

By 1920, a vocational structure was emerging at the PSA that divided members based on the jobs they did. The women's clerical sub-section had been formed the year before by Beveridge who would later serve as its secretary and president.

During the Great Depression years, 1930 to 1945, the Public Service Association of NSW fought a rearguard action to protect members and conducted campaigns to maintain jobs. In October 1937 the Industrial Arbitration (Amendment) Act increased the basic salary to £3 16s per week. However, this was only for men and the act actually cut the wages of women by two shillings to just a shilling over two pounds a week. Kathleen Clare O'Keeffe, Beveridge and others lobbied to have women who were qualified public servants to be given permanent and not temporary contracts.

When the new Queen was crowned, Beveridge received a Queen Elizabeth II coronation medal. She retired five years later and in 1961 she became a Member of The Most Excellent Order of the British Empire.

She was an active member of the Business and Profession Women's Club of Sydney. In 1960 she was speaking during Equal Pay Week in the club's 21st year. In the following year she went with the club to Rhodesia.

Beveridge died in 1978 in Mosman.
