= Australian Education Union =

Australian trade union

AEU
- Australian Education Union
- Founded: 1984
- Headquarters: Melbourne
- Location: Australia
- Members: ▼182,981 (as at 31 December 2024)
- Key people: Correna Haythorpe, Federal President
- Affiliations: ACTU, EI
- Website: www.aeufederal.org.au

The Australian Education Union (AEU) is an Australian trade union, founded in 1984 as the Australian Teachers Union, which is registered with Fair Work Australia as an employee group, and is affiliated with the Australian Council of Trade Unions. The AEU is Australia's third largest trade union, with 198,480 registered members in 2021, consisting of educators who work in public schools, colleges, early childhood and vocational settings in all states and territories of Australia. Members include teachers and allied educational staff, principals and administrators mainly in government school and TAFE systems. Teachers working in the private schools system are covered by the Independent Education Union of Australia (IEU). In some states the AEU shares coverage of some members with the National Tertiary Education Union, Community and Public Sector Union and United Workers Union. Through the Federation of Education Unions, the AEU works closely with the two other Federal unions which cover educators in non-government schools and universities. The AEU is also internationally affiliated to the Education International, which the AEU claims is "the largest non-government organisation in the world."

== National organisation ==
The Federal Office sees its core business as, "the maintenance of comprehensive industrial protection and representation through industrial awards and agreements in all industrial tribunals in Australia. This involves industrial research, negotiation and advocacy over a wide range of matters including salaries and teaching and learning conditions."

== History ==
In the 19th century the Colonial governments, which would later form the Commonwealth of Australia as states, established a variety of state schools. These schools were both demanded by the Australian trade union and labour movement, for the free education of the working class, and also used as a way to control the education and free time of the children of the Australian working class. Schools systems were highly stratified, with most children only receiving infants or primary education. Selection for Technical or Academic high school was highly competitive, and biased towards the children of agriculturalists, industrialists, business owners and professionals. Teachers were low-paid government employees and controlled by a series of moral codes that restricted their professional, personal and sexual conduct. Teachers were primarily educated in Technical colleges, fully funded by the governments, and indentured to Government employment in rural or remote districts for a long period. Buildings and teaching materials were notoriously bad, and often resulted in injuries to teachers or children. University educated teachers were a rarity, and tended to go into the private schools system.

The private school system itself was split between two main groups: a British-style system of schools for the elite, and a massively underfunded Catholic church-run system. The Catholic education system usually shared the poor working and teaching conditions of the state schools.

During the 1950s teachers in the state school system became more unionised and better organised. These women and men had received free University education on the condition that they teach in the state school system, or had received University training as a result of their status as Second World War veterans and had chosen to teach. These teachers, and those following them, campaigned to increase teacher's salaries, to transform the structure of Australian education, and to improve the curriculum.

This militancy achieved its peak in the 1970s when teachers won salaries equivalent to state parliament backbenchers, a massive and systemic initiative for building improvements, and massive curriculum reform.

The Australian Teachers Union was established in 1984, and following a series of union mergers with the ACT Teachers' Federation, the Northern Territory Teachers' Federation, the South Australian Institute of Teachers and the Australian Teachers' Federation, changed its name to the Australian Education Union in 1993.

== Indigenous education ==
The AEU has a designated Indigenous position on its Federal Executive, an Indigenous observer position on the AEU TAFE Executive, and runs an annual seminar on Aboriginal and Torres Strait Islander Education.

In 2010, the AEU made a submission (authorised by Angelo Gavrielatos, AEU Federal President) to the Australian Government's draft Indigenous Education Action Plan 2010–2014. The submission included 40 recommendations on improving Indigenous education, and stated: "The realistic timeframe that should be considered to achieve outcomes for Indigenous people equal to the rest of the community is to focus on the outcomes that should be expected for the children to be born in 20 to 25 years from today".

== See also ==
- Independent Education Union of Australia
