= Albert Monk =

Australian trade unionist

Albert Monk CMG
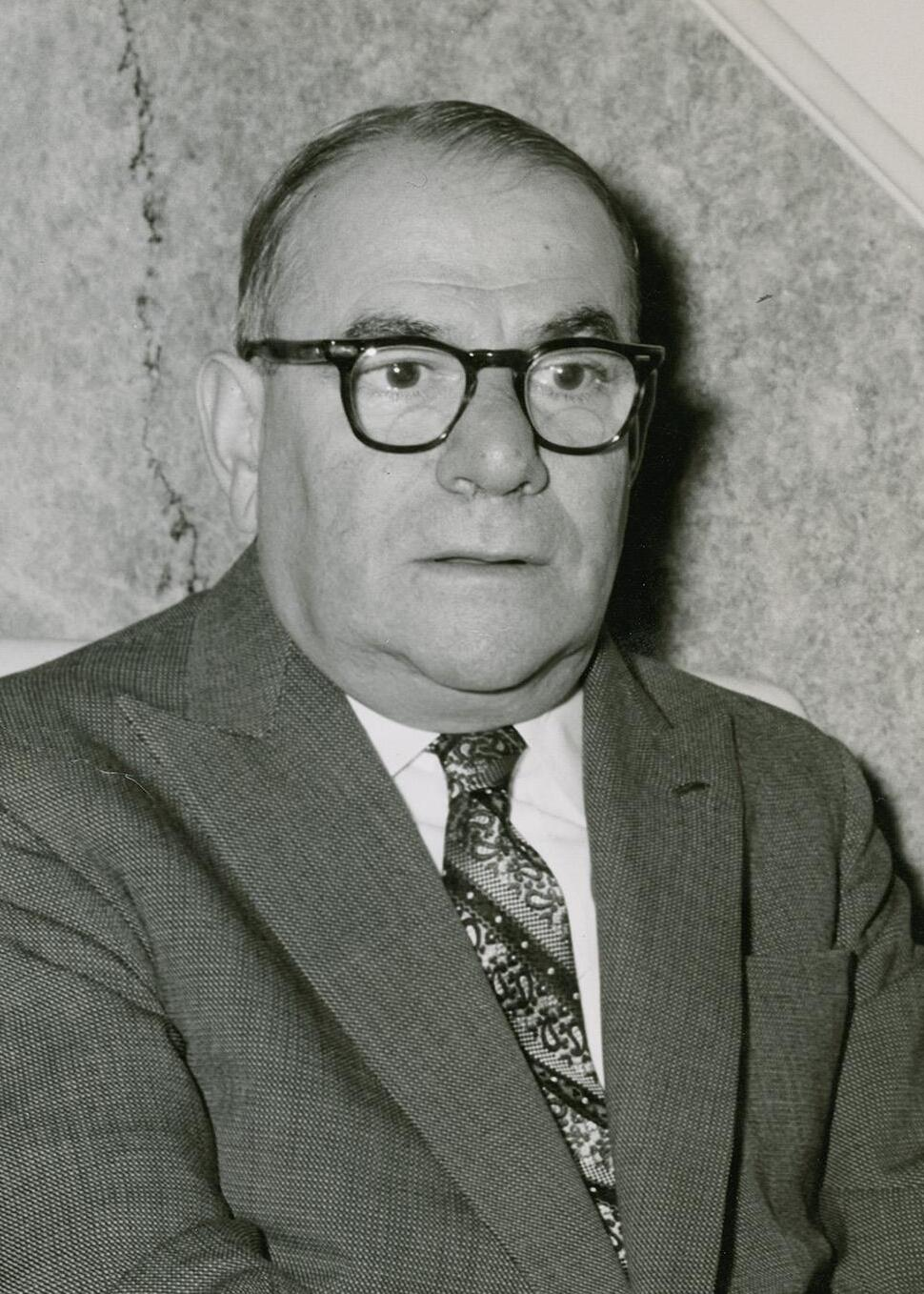

2nd President of the ACTU
- In office 1934–1943
- Preceded by: Billy Duggan
- Succeeded by: Percy Clarey
- In office 1949–1969
- Preceded by: Percy Clarey
- Succeeded by: Bob Hawke

2nd Secretary of the ACTU
- In office 1943–1949
- Preceded by: Charlie Crofts
- Succeeded by: Reg Broadby

Personal details
- Born: Albert Ernest Monk; 16 September 1900 Waltham Abbey, Essex, England
- Died: 11 February 1975 (aged 74) Fitzroy, Victoria, Australia
- Profession: Trade unionist

Albert Ernest Monk CMG (16 September 1900 – 11 February 1975) was an Australian trade unionist. He served as both President and Secretary of the Australian Council of Trade Unions (ACTU) for a total of 35 years; first as President from 1934 to 1943, then Secretary from 1943 to 1949, and then President again from 1949 to 1969.

== Early life ==
Monk was born on 16 September 1900 in Waltham Abbey, Essex, England. He was the son of Ada Kate (née Dennis) and Ernest George Monk.

Monk and his family emigrated to Australia in about 1910, where his father – a munitions expert – worked at the Maribyrnong Cordite Factory. He attended a state school in Moonee Ponds and later attended a business college where he learned shorthand. After completing his education he worked as a clerk for the Carters' and Drivers' Union.

== Labour movement ==
Monk began working for the Melbourne Trades Hall Council in 1924 and was promoted to assistant secretary in 1929. He was also secretary to the Conference of Federated Unions and was the minute secretary at the All-Australian Trade Union Congress in 1927, which resulted in the establishment of the Australasian Council of Trade Unions (ACTU). During the Great Depression he served as secretary of the Central Unemployment Committee and was appointed to the Victorian government's Unemployment Relief Works Board and the Victorian State Relief Committee (a government-funded food bank).

=== ACTU ===
In 1934, following Billy Duggan's death, Monk succeeded as secretary of the Trades Hall Council and president of the ACTU, then a part-time position.

== Personal life ==
Monk married Frances Fealy in 1943. In 1966 he was appointed a Companion of the Order of St Michael and St George. He retired to Moonee Ponds and died in Fitzroy on 11 February 1975, aged 74.

Writer Blanche d'Alpuget had intended to write a biography of Monk but was refused permission by Monk's widow, as she did not want the public to know that she was Monk's second wife.

D'Alpuget instead wrote a biography of Monk's successor as ACTU President and future Prime Minister Bob Hawke, whom she married in 1995.

Trade union offices
Preceded by Billy Duggan	President of the Australian Council of Trade Unions; 1934–1943	Succeeded by Percy Clarey
Preceded by Charlie Crofts	Secretary of the Australian Council of Trade Unions; 1943–1949	Succeeded by Reg Broadby
Preceded by Percy Clarey	President of the Australian Council of Trade Unions; 1949–1969	Succeeded by Bob Hawke
