= Kathleen Clare O'Keeffe =

Australian public servant and activist (b. 1883)

Kathleen Clare O'Keefe
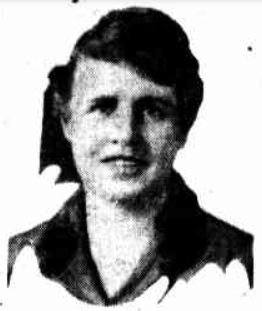
- in 1929
- Born: 9 January 1883; Maitland, New South Wales, Australia
- Died: 9 September 1949 (aged 66); Mosman, New South Wales, Australia
- Other names: O'Keeffe
- Occupations: Public servant; activist

Kathleen Clare O'Keefe (9 January 1883 – 9 September 1949) was an Australian public servant and campaigner for equal pay for women. She was the first woman elected to the executive of the Public Service Association of New South Wales in 1929.

== Life ==
O'Keefe was born in Maitland. Her parents were Susan (born Normoy) and Maurice O'Keeffe. Her father was a solicitor. She was their second child and her parents were both born in Australia.

In 1922 she came to notice when she won the Sydney Chamber of Commerce's prize to recognise her distinction in public administration as part of diploma in economics and commerce awarded by the University of Sydney. She had already served eleven years working for the state's Department of Mines. She had started as a typist and it was nine years before she was promoted to be a clerk.

In 1927 the Public Service Association of NSW (PSA) negotiated the first clerical award for women employees of the New South Wales government and she was involved. She also served on the clerical management and arbitration committees and she chaired the PSA's women's auxiliary. O'Keefe was the first woman to on the Public Service Association's executive in 1929. She was elected at a meeting of nearly a hundred members and only three of them were women.

Two years later she campaigned for amendments to the 1902 Public Service Act to include equal pay for women. She took several other courses and she became a child welfare inspector and school attendance officer.

In October 1937 the Industrial Arbitration (Amendment) Act increased the basic weekly salary of civil servants to £3 16s. However this was only for men and the act actually cut the wages of women by two shillings every week to just a shilling over two pounds. She and another PSA stalwart Dorothy Beveridge were among those who lobbied to have women who were qualified public servants to be given permanent and not temporary contracts.

In 1938 she resigned from the Child Welfare Department. She had never told her employers that she had married two years before. She had ignored the marriage bar in the public service and she had never said that she had a new name of Kathleen Graham. She had been married on Boxing Day in 1934 to a mining engineer at Sydney's St Mary's Catholic Cathedral.

O'Keefe lived in the Sydney suburb of Mosman and she died there in 1949.
