= Carlingford High School =

Public school in New South Wales, Australia

- "School Crest"
- 33°45′54″S 151°03′04″E; Carlingford, New South Wales; Australia

Information
- Type: Public, co-educational
- Motto: Adventure in Learning
- Established: January 1968
- Principal: David Krust
- Enrolment: >1531
- Campus type: Suburban
- Colours: Navy blue, sky blue
- Website: Carlingford High School

Carlingford High School is a comprehensive, co-educational government high school located at 547 North Rocks Road Carlingford, New South Wales 2118.

The school had over 1531 enrollments in 2023.

== History ==
The decision to build a new high school at North Carlingford was made in early 1967. Though the decision was originally not well received by the community, especially parents who lived in close proximity to Cumberland High School and whose children were already being sent by bus to Pennant Hills High School, building of the new school commenced in the Autumn. The contractor, AVJennings, was to complete sufficient of the building to enable the school to open on the first school day in 1968.

In October, the first principal, MJ Maiden, met 165 students who were in first form at Pennant Hills High School and who were destined for the new school, known officially at this stage as "Carlingford North High School". The students were dressed in school uniform designed by a committee of parents appointed by R. Stacey, principal of Pennant Hills High School. A further meeting was held with the parents where a motion was carried that the Department of Education be asked to name the school "Carlingford High School".

Two more meetings were held with the committee prior to the beginning of the new school year. At these meetings, finalized arrangements for the first school day of 1968 were made, along with the establishment of a school badge and motto. Much thought went into the latter with a view to linking the badge with the name "Carlingford". From H. Faters, former headmaster of Carlingford Rural School, informed the committee that Carlingford was named after Carlingford in Ireland. Maiden, wrote to the Embassy of Ireland in Canberra and received information about Irish Carlingford. It was then decided to design a badge and motto that would incorporate the "Venturegameness" of the Vikings and the idea that education should be an adventure. The design of the badge would be in keeping with the design of the school and with an Australian flavour, hence the square, severe line of the badge and the boomerang on which the motto appears. Several different designs were worked on by artists at "Perfection Plate" and indeed the Maiden family also worked on the design. After a quite argumentative meeting the committee finally reached a decision with the agreed motto "Adventure in Learning" put forward by the appointed deputy principal Mr. N. Leeder and the badge design created by Maiden's wife.

Carlingford High was the first NSW school to have a student council rather than prefects, an innovation of Maiden. As late as the Thursday before school was to resume it was by no means certain that the school would be open due to inclement weather, and the light flooding of B block. Although the weather cleared and concrete was poured on the Friday, And because of an unseasonably warm weekend, the school was able to be officially opened on Tuesday 31 January 1968.

This school is currently located on North Rocks Road between two primary schools, Roselea Public School and St Gerard's Catholic Primary School, near Plympton Rd

== Notable alumni ==
- Amanda Keller – (OAM) Gold Logie nominee, journalist, radio presenter, and media personality
- Sally McManus – Secretary of the ACTU
- Tim Brunero – Big Brother contestant
- Victor Mishalow – musician, musicologist
- Stephen O'Doherty – journalist, former politician
- Timmy Trumpet – musician, DJ
- Kenny Sabir – musician, founder Elefant Traks
- Kanishka Raffel - Anglican Archbishop of Sydney from 28 May 2021 to the present.

=== Notable former staff ===
- Peter Crawford – former politician; former Member for Balmain
