= Shop, Distributive and Allied Employees Association =

Australian trade union

SDA
- Shop, Distributive and Allied Employees' Association
- Nickname: Shoppies
- Founded: May 14, 1908; 118 years ago
- Type: Trade union
- Headquarters: SDA House, 53 Queen Street, Melbourne, Victoria
- Location: Australia
- Members: ▲196,933 (as at 31 December 2025)
- National President: Michael Donovan
- National Secretary: Gerard Dwyer
- Main organ: National Council (federal level); State Council (state branch level)
- Affiliations: ACTU, UNI, ALP
- Website: national.sda.com.au
- Remarks: Official slogan: United & Strong; At Work With You

The Shop, Distributive and Allied Employees' Association (SDA) is a private sector trade union in Australia, representing retail, fast-food and warehousing workers, and has branches in each state and territory. Its membership is predominantly in casual and insecure employment within retail and fast food establishments. The union also represents a significant membership of workers from culturally and linguistically diverse backgrounds.

The main industries in which the SDA provides coverage to workers is in retail, fast food and warehousing, but the SDA also provides coverage and union representation to reserve and backdock employees, pharmacy workers, footwear repairers and cobblers, as well as models, hairdressers, beauticians and stylists. The SDA overlaps with other trade unions and their areas of coverage, such as the Australasian Meat Industry Employees Union in the case of retail meat employees and the United Workers Union's coverage of warehousing employees and bakers. There is also an overlap with the Australian Worker's Union, who covers retail and hospitality workers in Far North Queensland, North Queensland and parts of Central Queensland, where the two Unions operate collectively as the North Queensland Retail Alliance.

Throughout its history, the SDA has campaigned for improvements to wages, working hours, leave entitlements, occupational health and safety, and employment conditions. Its reported historical achievements include the introduction of a five-day working week, the establishment of a 38-hour working week, improvements to annual leave and parental leave, equal pay for women, and employer superannuation contributions.

In recent years, the SDA has pursued campaigns concerning junior pay rates, wage underpayments and workplace safety. Its Adult Age = Adult Wage campaign sought to remove junior wage rates for adult employees aged 18 to 20 in retail, fast food and pharmacy. The SDA’s submission received a verdict in March 2026 after the Fair Work Commission ruled that eligible employees in these industries would receive the full adult award rate after six months' experience with their current employer, with changes to be phased in from December 2026. In October 2026, the Federal Court approved a settlement in proceedings initiated by the SDA concerning unpaid pre-shift and post-shift work at ALDI, covering approximately 32,300 current and former employees and bringing the retailer's total remediation liability to approximately $55.2 million, including previous payments.

The SDA has branches across Australia. There is the Victorian Branch; New South Wales & ACT Branch; Newcastle & Northern Branch; Queensland Branch; South Australian/Northern Territory & Broken Hill Branch; Western Australian Branch; and the Tasmanian Branch. The SDA is affiliated to several organisations, which include the Australian Labor Party (ALP), the Australian Council of Trade Unions (ACTU), and the global union federation, UNI Global Union. Through its affiliation to the ALP, the union has maintained a strong history of political involvement; with the union being an influential force in the Labor Right.

== Branches ==
The SDA is organised into seven autonomous branches across Australia. Each branch has its own governance arrangements and represents members within its respective administrative area.

Branch	Headquarters	Branch secretary	Membership	Website
SDA Victorian Branch	Southbank, Victoria	Michael Donovan	41,633	Official website
SDA New South Wales and ACT Branch	Sydney, New South Wales	Bernie Smith	57,120	Official website
SDA Newcastle and Northern Branch	Newcastle West, New South Wales	David Bliss	13,422	Official website
SDA Queensland Branch	Fortitude Valley, Queensland	Justin Power	25,169	Official website
SDA South Australian, Northern Territory and Broken Hill Branch	Kent Town, South Australia	Josh Peak	32,938	Official website
SDA Western Australian Branch	Perth, Western Australia	Ben Harris	20,056	Official website
SDA Tasmanian Branch	Launceston, Tasmania	Joel Tynan	6,595	Official website
Total			196,933	

== History ==
=== Early history ===
During the 1890s and the early 1900s, the predecessors of the SDA first came into existence in most states, particularly through 'Early Closing Associations' focused on restricting shop trading hours. These Associations had begun campaigning for a reduction in working hours from 14 to 12 hours a day as early as 1844.

In 1908, unions representing retail and warehousing workers in New South Wales, Queensland, Victoria and South Australia combined to become the Shop Assistants and Warehouse Employees Federation of Australia. It was registered as a union under the Commonwealth Conciliation and Arbitration Act 1904.

Over time, unions in Tasmania, Newcastle, Broken Hill and Western Australia became part of the national union. In 1972, the union changed its name to the Shop, Distributive and Allied Employees' Association.

In the 1940s and 50s, the union was involved with the Australian Labor Party's (ALP) Industrial Groups that were organised to counter communists in the unions. These unions de-affiliated themselves with the Victorian ALP during the ALP split of 1955. The SDA re-affiliated with the Australian Labor Party in the 1980s under Labor leader Bob Hawke and is currently a member of the Labor Right faction of the party.

=== Women ===
During the war years of the 1940s the retail industry changed from being a substantially male occupation to having large numbers of women. The SDA was instrumental in achieving equal pay for women in 1975, with women comprising more than 65% of the SDA's membership as of 2010.

The union was heavily involved in achieving the 44-hour working week in 1945 and then the 38-hour week in 1984. Other achievements include winning redundancy pay in 1986, four weeks annual leave in 1974 and 12 months maternity leave in 1979.

In 1987, the SDA helped facilitate compulsory employer payments of 3% superannuation for employees paid into industry fund REST Super with joint union-employer directors.

=== Recent history ===
In 1991, the Australian Hairdressers, Wigmakers and Hairworkers Employees' Federation and the Mannequins' & Models' Guild of Australia merged with the SDA.

The SDA has a history of campaigning across the broader union movement. It was the biggest financial contributor to unions in the 1998 Australian waterfront dispute and the 'Your Rights At Work' campaign, which is credited with overturning John Howard's WorkChoices laws. It continues this tradition today through its contribution to the ACTU's Change The Rules campaign focused on reforming Australian industrial relations in the lead up to the 2019 federal election.

The SDA was led for 36 years from 1978 to 2014 by National Secretary Joe de Bruyn. De Bruyn was previously Senior Vice President of the Australian Council of Trade Unions ACTU and was President of global union federation UNI Global Union from 2010 to 2014. He did not stand for re-election in 2014 and former NSW Branch Secretary Gerard Dwyer was elected National Secretary by the SDA's National Council. De Bruyn remained the SDA's honorary National President until he was replaced by Victorian Branch Secretary Michael Donovan 2018.

In the 1980s, under the leadership of de Bruyn, the SDA strongly supported the Polish free trade union movement, Solidarity. The SDA brought Solidarity on tour to Australia to pressure the repressive, communist Polish Government as well as financially support charities that assisted Poland in its transition from communism.

In 2015, ABC's Four Corners reported widespread wage theft and exploitation at 7-Eleven franchise stores. In response, the SDA established a hotline and dedicated team of industrial officers to help workers recover lost wages. The union has made numerous submissions calling for a reform of the Franchise Code of Conduct.

Following the 2017 launch of Amazon in Australia, the SDA and the Transport Workers Union formed the Online Retail & Delivery Workers Alliance. The alliance is part of a global movement led by UNI Global Union and its affiliates to organise workers in Amazon fulfilment centres.

== Industrial activity ==
=== Youth wages ===
Australia operates a system of youth wages where it is legal for workers under the age of 21 to be paid a percentage of the adult wage rate for their job. The SDA has campaigned and called for the abolition of junior wages for decades.

In 2013 the SDA began a national campaign to end youth wages for workers aged 18 years of age and the retail industry. This commenced with a case at the Fair Work Commission to remove the ninety percent rate for 20-year-olds in the retail award. The Fair Work Commission ruled in favour of the SDA's application in 2014 and the 20-year-old rate began to phase out in the retail award from 2015.

In March 2026, the Fair Work Commission would hand down its decision in favor of abolishing junior rates for those on retail, fast food and pharmacy Awards for all 18, 19 and 20 year olds.

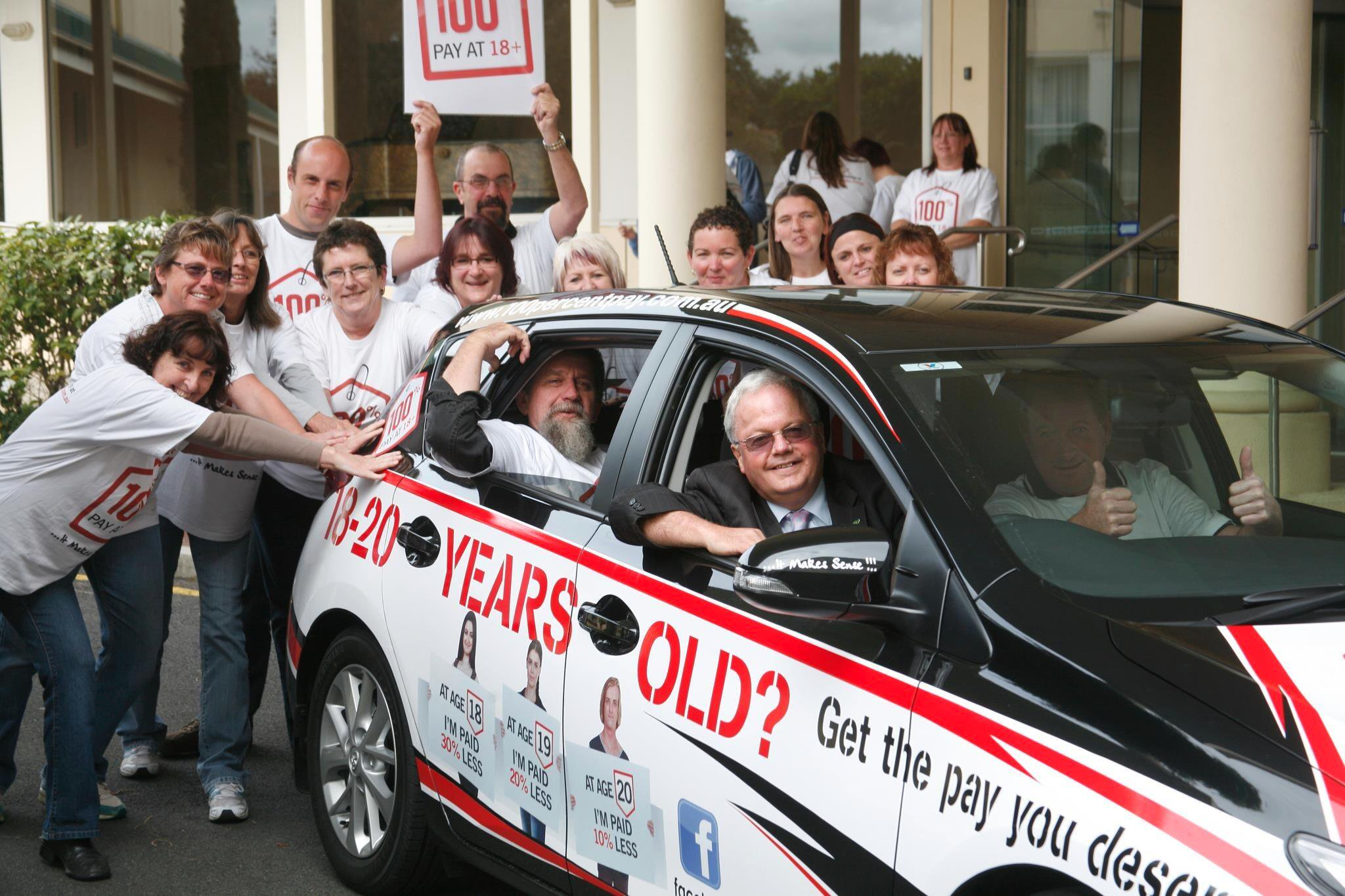
The 100% Pay at 18+ campaign

=== Customer violence and abuse ===
In 2017, the SDA launched a national public awareness campaign "No One Deserves a Serve" to combat what the union described as the growing problem of violence and abuse directed at retail workers by customers. A survey conducted by the union of 6,000 retail and fast food workers found that more than 85 per cent had experienced abuse from customers. Almost three-quarters (74 percent) of respondents were women, and 65 percent of respondents worked in front end services (like cashiers and registers) and just over half (51 percent) of respondents said that no action was taken after they reported an incident.

In 2018, the SDA launched its campaign Don't Bag Retail Staff in response to the highly publicised ban of free single-use plastic bags introduced in some states.

=== Public holidays ===
The SDA has advocated for protecting and expanding public holiday rights and entitlements across all Australian states and territories.

South Australia & Northern Territory

In South Australia, the SDA spearheaded the campaign to achieve part-day public holidays after 6pm on Christmas Eve and New Year's Eve. In 2012, the South Australian government legislated these new part-day public holidays into law - making it a national first. The same was achieved in the Northern Territory in 2015.

New South Wales & Newcastle

The SDA NSW and Newcastle branches launched the Take The Time campaign to protect retail closures on key public holidays, such as Christmas Day and Boxing Day, Good Friday, Easter Sunday and Anzac Day.

In 2015, the NSW government introduced changes to the Retail Trading Act to allow for a trial of retail trading on Boxing Day. As part of the Take The Time campaign, the SDA strongly opposed moves to permanently allow stores to open on Boxing Day - or any remaining trading-free days.

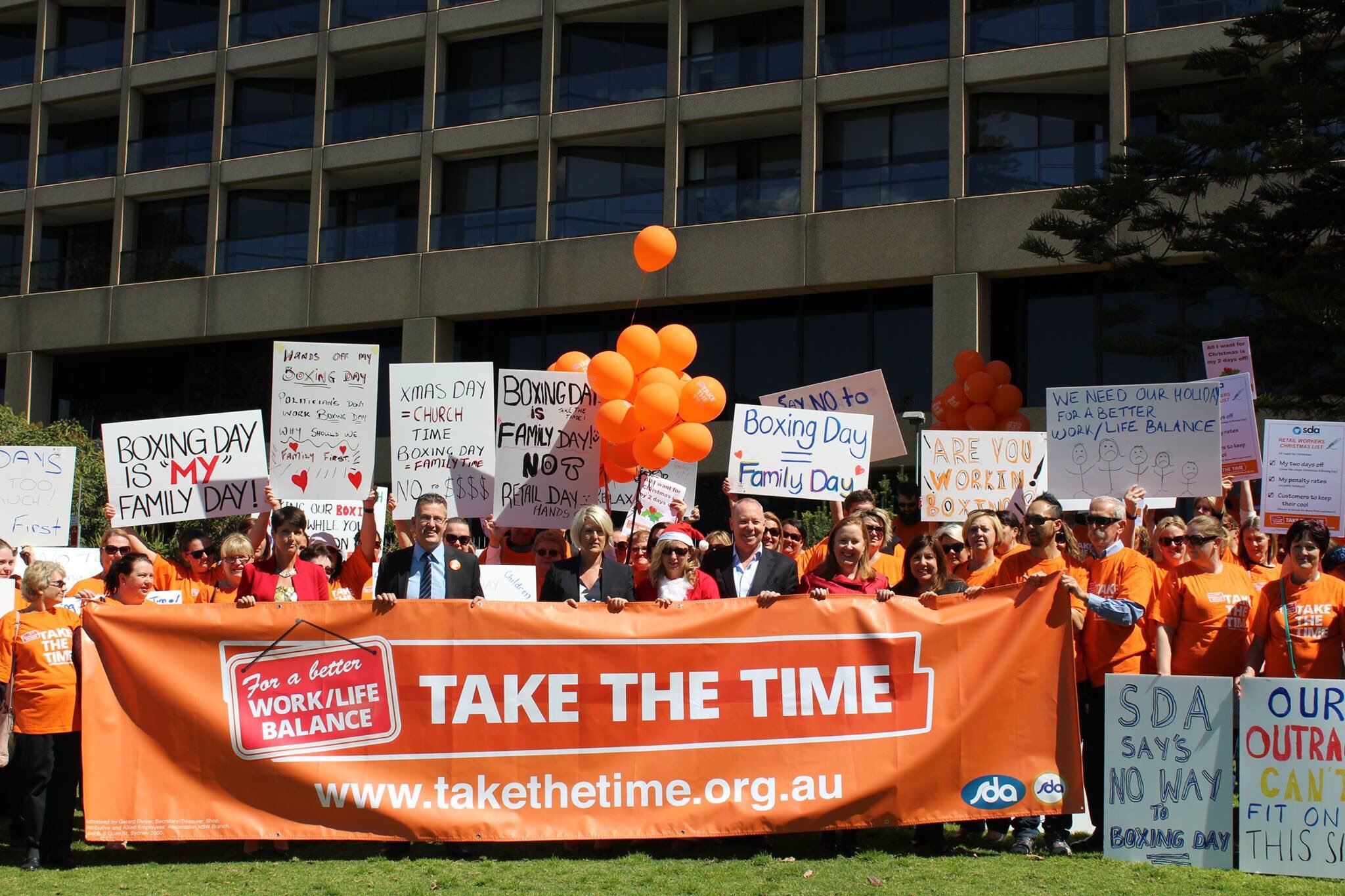
SDA NSW branch campaigns to protect Boxing Day as a public holiday

Victoria

In 2015, the SDA successfully campaigned for the creation of an Easter Sunday public holiday. In the same year, the Friday before AFL grand final day was also gazetted as a newly created public holiday. Following efforts by the SDA, Victoria increased its number of public holidays to 13 days per year - the highest number in the nation.

Western Australia

In 2017, the SDA Western Australian branch launched a campaign to have Easter Saturday and Easter Sunday legislated as formal public holidays. The campaign was launched amid criticism that WA only had 10 official public holidays a year - the lowest of any state or territory.

Queensland

In 2017, the SDA Queensland branch successfully campaigned for and won Easter Sunday as a legislated public holiday. It was the first new public holiday achieved in Queensland since Anzac Day in 1927.

The Queensland branch continues to campaign for Christmas Eve and New Year's Eve part-day public holidays.

=== Industrial approach ===
As a result of the SDA's coverage, the union claims it is moderate and responsible in its approach to industrial relations. Academics Robin A. Price, Janis Bailey and Amanda Pyman have argued that though "referred to pejoratively as a 'business union'", the union "has been remarkably successful as an organisation, as measured by a number of indicators, including growth and size, and pay increases relative to statutory minimum conditions". Research conducted by Ernst & Young has found that Australia ranks second (with Denmark ranked first) out of 12 countries when comparing the average monthly retail industry wage on a purchasing power parity (PPP) basis.

== Criticisms ==
In Hart v Coles Supermarkets Australia Pty Ltd and Bi-Lo Pty Ltd [2016] FWCFB 2887 (31 May 2016), the Full Bench of the Fair Work Commission (FWC) refused to approve an enterprise agreement for Coles Supermarkets on the basis that it did not pass the 'better off overall test' (BOOT). The FWC's decision effectively overturned a practice used by many unions since the 1980s and endorsed by the ACTU in the Daimaru Case in 1992. Following this decision, some media outlets criticised the union for poor outcomes in its workplace negotiations due to the union bargaining for industry-wide conditions with a result of beneath-award pay outcomes for members, despite the newly applied test not taking into account above Award conditions including Annual Leave Loading. The Sydney Morning Herald claimed that a quarter of a million workers across several major employers had been underpaid as a result of the union's negotiations, labelling it a "national wages scandal". Penalty rates, for working at night or on weekend, were scrapped in some agreements in return for higher base rates at all hours.

The union has also been criticised for its close relationship with employers, which The Sydney Morning Herald has labelled "a longstanding and cosy partnership". One controversial aspect of this has been the widely used practice across many industries of paying an administration charge for payroll deduction of union dues from major companies. The union defended the arrangements, citing the importance of payroll deductions for members who work fluctuating hours.

== Political activity ==
The SDA is affiliated with the Australian Labor Party and is one of the most powerful unions in the Australian Labor Party's Labor Right faction. The union has been a leading supporter of many significant Labor Party reforms including Medicare, Compulsory Superannuation and abolishing John Howard's WorkChoices laws. The SDA's Victorian branch was the largest individual donor to the Victorian Labor Party in 2013–14, giving $315,667.

SDA Secretary, Gerard Dwyer, is currently an elected member of the Australian Labor Party National Executive. Present federal members of Australia's parliamentary Labor Party that have a close association with the SDA include House of Representatives members Tony Burke and Amanda Rishworth and Senators Raff Ciccone, Don Farrell, Deborah O'Neill and Helen Polley. Historically, the SDA leadership has taken some socially conservative positions especially concerning issues like abortion, IVF, and same-sex marriage in Australia. In 2016, the SDA formally declared neutrality on the issue of same sex marriage with the National Executive of the SDA adopting a policy of supporting the right of members of the ALP to act according to their conscience on the matter. Prior to this, several SDA-aligned Labor MPs expressed public support for same-sex marriage in opposition to the SDA leadership including Kate Ellis, Amanda Rishworth and Nick Champion.

In July 2026, SDA secretary Bernie Smith moved a motion at the 2026 New South Wales Labor Party conference to oppose Town Hall Square.

== See also ==
- Peter Malinauskas
- Retail and Fast Food Workers Union
- Don Farrell
- Joe de Bruyn
