= Robynne Quiggin =

Indigenous Australian lawyer and social justice advocate

- Occupations: Pro-Vice Chancellor, Indigenous Leadership and Engagement, UTS
- Employer: University of Technology, Sydney
- Known for: Law and social justice

Robynne Melva Quiggin is an Indigenous Australian lawyer and social justice advocate. She is known for her advocacy for Aboriginal and Torres Strait Islander people and their community through governance roles, for social policy, and the rights of First Nations people. In 2025 she was honoured as Officer of the Order of Australia. As of 2026 she is Pro-Vice Chancellor, Indigenous Leadership and Engagement, at the University of Technology, Sydney.

== Early life and education ==
Robynne Melva Quiggin is a descendant of the Wiradjuri nation, located in the central western region of New South Wales.

She was focused on social justice from an early age. When she was young, she "saw inequality and unfairness in the world", and decided that working in law was one of the most useful careers she could undertake to have an impact on equity for First Nations people.

In her twenties, she saw Marcia Langton passionately discussing land rights, and the value of education as a way to improve outcomes for First Nations people. She was also inspired by Jenny Munrow, a First Nations community worker. Solicitors such as Margaret Donaldson and Terri Janke also inspired her.

== Career ==
Quiggin started her career at the solicitors Terri Janke and Company, which is one of the few Australian Aboriginal-owned and operated legal companies in Australia.

During 2000 to 2013, Quiggin worked at her self-founded legal and consulting firm, which focussed on cultural and legal issues for Aboriginal and Torres Strait Islander people. She also has lectured in both Indigenous issues and law, at the University of Technology, Sydney (UTS). She has expertise in copyright and consumer law, wills, and conveyancing. Quiggin has worked in policy, human rights advocacy, as well as being on boards and the chair for various Indigenous and Sustainability organisations.

Quiggin was the chair of the board of the NSW Aboriginal Housing Office, Westpac's Indigenous Advisory Committee, the Human Rights Law Centre, as well as a board member for Bangarra, Supply Nation, The Australian Sustainable Finance Institute. Quiggin was also a trust member of the Powerhouse Museum, as well as the Australian Museum. She was the first Indigenous trustee of the Museum of Applied Arts and Sciences (Powerhouse) in the museum's history.

Quiggin was also Deputy Commissioner to the Acting Aboriginal and Torres Strait Islander Social Justice Commissioner, Professor Gillian Triggs.

As of October 2026 she is a professor, and the pro-vice-chancellor of Indigenous Leadership and Engagement at UTS, a position she has held for some years.

Quiggin was a member of the First Nations Clean Energy Network Steering Group. She was also a previous member of the Net Zero Economy Agency advisory board, and as of October 2026 is a board member of the subsequently legislated statutory authority, the Net Zero Economy Authority.

== Recognition and honours ==
- 2013: AFR/Westpac's 100 Women of Influence awards
- 2025: Officer of the Order of Australia in the Australia Day honours, "for distinguished service to the law and human rights, to tertiary education, and to the Indigenous community through leadership and governance roles"

== Publications ==
Quiggins has published on democracy, Indigenous knowledge, and intellectual property and Indigenous culture.

- Quiggin R. Indigenous Knowledge and the Convention on Biological Diversity. The Australian Journal of Indigenous Education. 2008;37(S1):46-55. doi:10.1375/S1326011100000363
- Quiggin R, Quiggin, J (2007). Intellectual property and Indigenous Culture. Research in Agriculture and Applied Economics. doi:10.22004/ag.econ.151515
- Quiggin, R. (2005). Legal issues for indigenous artists - an update. Ngoonjook, (26), 25–34. doi/10.3316/informit.912395998558504
