= Jeff Lawrence (unionist) =

Australian trade unionist

8th Secretary of the ACTU
- In office 2007–2012
- President: Sharan Burrow; Ged Kearney
- Preceded by: Greg Combet
- Succeeded by: Dave Oliver

Deputy President of the Fair Work Commission
- In office 2013–2016/17

Personal details
- Born: 17 May 1952 (age 74) Newcastle, New South Wales, Australia
- Occupation: Trade unionist

Jeff Lawrence (born 17 May 1952) is an Australian trade unionist who was the Secretary of the Liquor, Hospitality and Miscellaneous Union (LMHU). Lawrence was Secretary of the LHMU, one of Australia's biggest unions, from 1990 to 2007.

Lawrence was born in Newcastle, New South Wales in 1952. He became an Assistant General Secretary of the Federated Miscellaneous Workers Union in 1986 and became the General Secretary two years later. The union changed its name two years later. Lawrence became the Vice-President of the New South Wales branch of the Australian Labor Party in 2002.

In 2007, Lawrence was chosen to replace Greg Combet as the Secretary of the ACTU, Combet stood down to contest the safe Labor seat of Charlton in the 2007 Federal election. Lawrence resigned from his position with the NSW ALP when he became the Secretary of the ACTU.

In 2013, Lawrence was appointed by then Minister for Employment and Workplace Relations, Financial Services and Superannuation Bill Shorten as a Deputy President of the Fair Work Commission. His appointment was criticised by Senator Eric Abetz due to his links with the ALP. Lawrence served on the Fair Work Commission until the 2016–17 financial year.

Trade union offices
Preceded by Martin Ferguson	General Secretary of the Federated Miscellaneous Workers' Union; 1990–2007	Succeeded by Lousie Tarrant
