= New South Wales Typographical Association =

The New South Wales Typographical Association (NSWTA) was an Australian trade union that existed between 1880 and 1916. It represented compositors, skilled tradesmen responsible for typesetting in the printing trade.

== History ==
A series of meetings was held in early 1880 which led to the formation of the New South Wales Typographical Association on 15 June 1882. Originally registered under the New South Wales Trade Union Act, in 1918 it was to become the New South Wales branch of the Printing Industry Employees' Union of Australia.

The organisation achieved some notoriety for boycotting The Dawn for employing non-union labor – women, who they refused to permit to join the association. In 1911 the secretary of the NSWTA assisted female employees in the printing industry to form the Printing Trade Women and Girls' Union and then to obtain their first award in November 1912.

On 13 August 1890, the Western Star and Roma Advertiser newspaper of Toowoomba, Queensland reported that one Miss Hill, employed by a Printer named Mr Jarrett of Clarence Street, was refused admittance to the union.

On 6 May 1902, the Sydney Morning Herald reported that "the monthly board meeting of the New South Wales Typographical Association was held at the Trades Hall on Saturday night The president (Mr T W Spicer) occupied the chair. The Barrier Typographical Society was recommended to register under the Arbitration Act. In response to the re- quest of the Sydney Labour Council for assistance to the Newcastle wharf labourers the sum of £10 was voted. Messrs. George Watkins and J A Fraser were appointed delegates to the eight-hour demonstration committee, and the inaugural loan of £4 was voted. Twenty-seven new members were admitted. Hospital donations amounting to £10 were voted."

On 6 December 1916 the NSWTA merged with the other state-based affiliates of the Australian Typographical Union to form the Printing Industry Employees' Union of Australia.
