= Billy Duggan =

Australian trade unionist

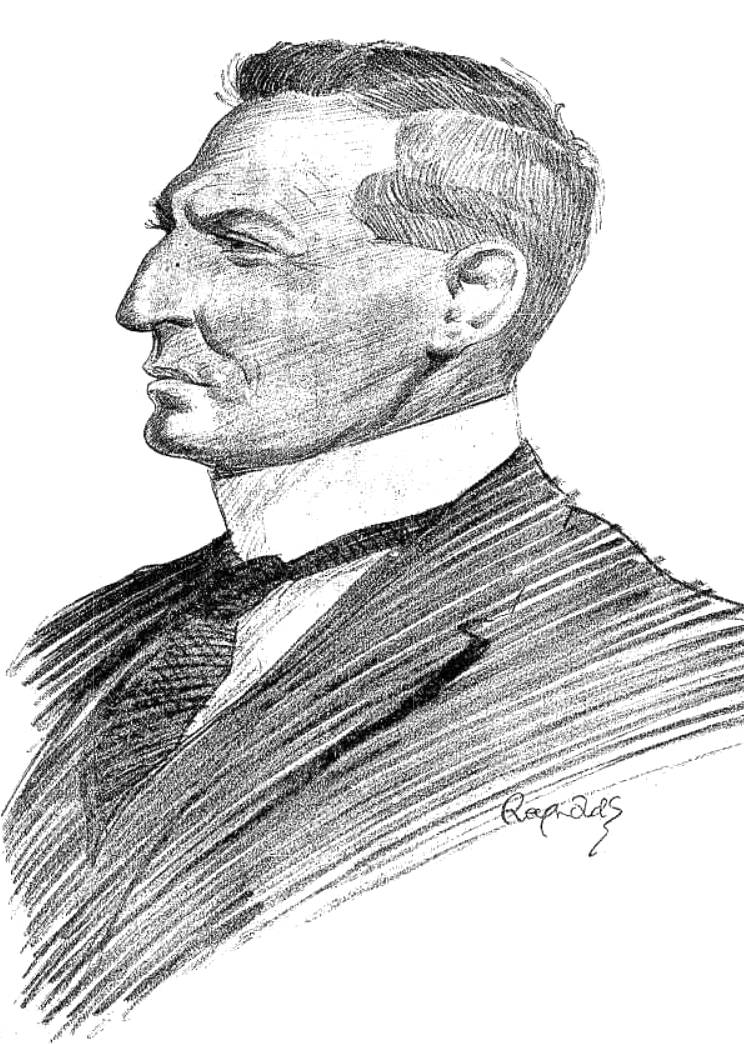
- Duggan in 1929

1st President of the Australian Council of Trade Unions
- In office 1927–1934
- Succeeded by: Albert Monk

Secretary of the Victorian Trades Hall Council
- In office 1931–1933
- Preceded by: Maurice Boyce Duffy
- Succeeded by: Albert Monk

President of the Victorian Labor Party
- In office 1928–1929

Mayor of Coburg
- In office 1928–1929

Personal details
- Born: January 31, 1884 Melbourne, Colony of Victoria
- Died: July 4, 1934 (aged 50) Moreland, Victoria, Australia
- Resting place: Melbourne General Cemetery
- Party: Australian Labor Party
- Spouse: Frances Annie Barratt
- Children: 2
- Profession: Plumber

Military service
- Allegiance: Australia
- Branch/service: Australian Navy
- Years of service: 1911–1913
- Rank: Lieutenant

William Joseph Duggan (31 January 1884 – 4 July 1934) was an Australian trade unionist who served as the first president of the Australian Council of Trade Unions.

Duggan was born in Melbourne to ironoulder William Duggan and Elizabeth Margaret, née Whitmore. He attended local state schools before working as an estate agent and plumber, eventually joining the navy. In his early years he developed both his penchant for self-education and his boxing skills. He later left the navy to return to plumbing. On 12 March 1910 he married Frances Annie Barratt at St James Old Cathedral. In March 1912, as a member of the Commonwealth Military Cadet Corps, he was commissioned lieutenant, but in 1913 he resigned; despite his early support for military training he would oppose conscription during the 1916–17 referendums.

Duggan had joined the United Operative Plumbers and Gasfitters' Society of Victoria (which became the Australian Plumbers and Gasfitters Employees Union in 1912) in 1910. He was state vice-president from August 1911 until his election as first organiser in January 1912. In 1914 he became first secretary of the Building Trades Federation, and in March 1918 he sat on the Shipbuilding Tribunal. He continued to be active in the union movement throughout the 1920s, serving as a Plumbers' Union delegate on the Victorian Trades Hall Council until his election as THC President (1926–27). He chaired the 1927 Third All-Australian Trade Union Congress, which established the Australian Council of Trade Unions of which he was inaugural president, serving until 1934.

He was also active in the Australian Labor Party, serving as first metropolitan council president in 1926 and as Victorian president from 1928 to 1929. He served on the federal executive (1929–31, 1932) and ran for preselection for Bendigo in 1928, unsuccessfully contesting Henty in 1929. He served on Coburg Council from 1924 to 1930 and as mayor from 1928 to 1929.

Duggan died from a duodenal ulcer in 1934 at Moreland.

Trade union offices
New title	President of the Australian Council of Trade Unions; 1927–1934	Succeeded by Albert Monk
