= Australian Salaried Medical Officers' Federation =

Australian trade union

ASMOF
- Australian Salaried Medical Officers' Federation
- Headquarters: Glebe, New South Wales
- Location: Australia
- Members: ▲23,084 (as at 1 April 2026)
- Affiliations: ACTU
- Website: www.asmof.org.au

The Australian Salaried Medical Officers' Federation (ASMOF) is an Australian trade union, affiliated with the Australian Council of Trade Unions, that represents doctors who receive salaries. In Australia doctors operate as self-employed tradespeople, or as salaried employees of clinics, hospitals, or other organisations; ASMOF represents the interests of salaried doctors as employees. ASMOF has a federated state-based structure, with state branches playing a major role in its operation; the state-based structure of the union is largely a function of Australian states being primarily responsible for health care regulation and funding. ASMOF represents more than 15,000 doctors across Australia.

== History ==
ASMOF affiliated with the ACTU in 1991. ASMOF was the result of a long federation process operating between different state-based salaried doctors' associations. In the early 1980s these organisations formed the Australian Council of Salaried Medical Officers' Organisations, through which they sought better coordination of the interests of doctors as employees.

== State branches ==
In Tasmania and the Northern Territory, the state/territorial branches of ASMOF are operated subordinate to the relevant state branch of the Australian Medical Association.

The New South Wales state branch, which has been in existence since 1972, was known as the Public Medical Officers' Association prior to 1991.
