= Independent Education Union of Australia =

Union of employees working in non-government schools in Australia

IEU
- Independent Education Union of Australia
- Founded: 1954
- Headquarters: Canberra, ACT
- Location: Australia
- Members: ▼71,850 (as at 31 December 2024)
- Key people: Carol Matthews, President; Brad Hayes, Federal Secretary
- Affiliations: ACTU, Education International
- Website: www.ieu.org.au

The Independent Education Union of Australia (IEU), with a current membership of over 75,000, is the federally registered industry union representing all employees working in non-government schools and institutions across Australia. Included in its membership are principals, teachers, and various categories of clerical, administrative, educational support staff and school services officers employed in primary and secondary schools; and teachers working in some private pre-school settings, Life Education Centres, business colleges and private English Language colleges.

The state branches of the IEU are:

- New South Wales /Australian Capital Territory Independent Education Union (NSW/ACT IEU)
- Independent Education Union Victoria Tasmania (IEU Vic/Tas)
- Queensland Independent Education Union (QIEU) – Independent Education Union Australia – Queensland & Northern Territory Branch (IEUA–QNT)
- Independent Education Union South Australia (IEU SA)
- Independent Education Union Western Australia (IEU WA)

Teachers working in the State Government schools system are covered by the Australian Education Union (AEU).

== Split from ACTU ==
On 4 July 2011 the Union disaffiliated from the ACTU due to concerns relating to education policy. It has since re-affiliated.
