= Flight Attendants' Association of Australia =

Australian trade union

FAAA
- Flight Attendants' Association of Australia
- Founded: 1992
- Location: Australia
- Members: ▲7,050 (as at 31 December 2024)
- Key people: Terry O’Toole (Federal Secretary); David Horsfall (President)
- Affiliations: ACTU
- Website: www.faaa.org.au

The Flight Attendants' Association of Australia (FAAA) is a trade union in Australia. It is divided into two separate entities:

- Flight Attendants' Association of Australia – National Division
- Flight Attendants' Association of Australia – International Division

The FAAA is affiliated with the Australian Council of Trade Unions.

== 2016 Election ==
The FAAA – international division is the largest international flight attendant union in Australia comprising international flight attendants from Qantas and Virgin Australia.

The current team in the International Division of the FAAA are led by legal professional and long term flight attendant Teri O'toole. Her executive team comprises Lou Nesci, David Horsfall, Miranda Diack and Bruce Roberts. This team swept to victory in a landslide election win against outgoing secretary Michael Mijatov and officials after a hard-fought 2016 election campaign. The election saw a record 80% member vote return with nearly 70% of votes going to Teri and her Reclaim Your FAAA group.
