= Charlie Crofts =

Australian trade unionist

Charles Alfred Crofts (11 July 1871 – 25 March 1950) was an Australian trade unionist.

Born at Bethnal Green in England to general dealer James Crofts and Ann Rebecca, née Luxton, Crofts entered the workforce at the age of twelve, leaving school to work in a sheet metal factory and joining the Tinsmiths, Braziers and Gas Meter Makers' Society of London. He married Agnes Humphreys at Bethnal Green on 6 August 1893. He and his family moved to Melbourne in 1898, where Crofts became a member of the Sheet Metal Workers' Union (SMWU), serving as vice-president (1907) and president (1908–09). In 1911 he was on the first executive of the Federated Gas Employees' Industrial Union and in 1914 was elected to the SMWU's national executive. He defied his employer, the Metropolitan Gas Company, to attend a union meeting in Sydney in 1914 and was subsequently dismissed, but soon after won the position of secretary to the Gas Employees' Union, a paid position, winning the national secretaryship two months later.

Crofts, an activist president, served on the Melbourne Trades Hall Council's executive and was its president from 1924 to 1925. He was secretary of the Commonwealth Council of Federated Unions from 1923 to 1927 and was first secretary of the Australian Council of Trade Unions in 1927, a position he held until 1943. In 1943 he was the Australian delegate to the Fourteenth Session of the International Labour Conference in Geneva, the International Federation of Trade Unions' Fifth Annual Congress in Stockholm, and the British Commonwealth Labour Conference in London; he also served as a deputy on the board of the International Labour Organization. A leading workers' advocate during the Depression, he retired from the secretaryship in 1943 to concentrate on his presidency of the Gas Employees' Union.

Crofts was also active in the Australian Labor Party, serving as a Victorian executive member and Federal conference delegate and being president (1926–27) and treasurer (1942–44) of the Victorian branch. He ran unsuccessfully for the Senate in 1934. He was frequently an advocate in the Arbitration Court. Identified as a moderate within the Labor movement, Crofts was a firm anti-communist but identified as a socialist. He died at Caulfield in 1950 and was cremated.
