= Printing Industry Employees' Union of Australia =

The Printing Industry Employees' Union of Australia (PIEUA) was an Australian trade union which existed between 1915 and 1966. It represented a range of production and trades workers in the printing industry.

== History ==
The PIEUA was formed on 6 December 1916 through the merger of several state-based affiliates of the Australasian Typographical Union - the New South Wales Typographical Association, the Queensland Typographical Association, the West Australian Typographical Industrial Union and the South Australian Typographical Association. The impetus for amalgamation was a desire to seek an award under the federal arbitration system, which was achieved in the following year. In its early years the PIEUA primarily represented compositors - skilled tradesmen responsible for typesetting, who formed an 'aristocracy of labour' within the printing industry. Soon after its formation, however, the PIEUA began expanding its industrial remit to cover a broader range of workers. In NSW the Printing Trade Women and Girls' Union was absorbed in May 1917 (on the proviso that they would not 'accept employment in the sections of the Industry now covered by male labor'), while members of the moribund Cardboard Boxmakers' Union voted to merge with the PIEUA in 1919.

In 1888 the Western Australian Typographical Society formed. This union changed its name in 1900 to the Western Australian Typographical Industrial Union of Workers and became the Western Australian branch of the Printing Industries Employees Union of Australia in 1916. The formation of the Victorian branch of the PIEUA only occurred in 1921 due to disputes between the small craft unions in the printing trade. The Victorian Typographical Society merged to become part of the PIEUA Victorian branch. The Australian Bookbinders & Paper Rulers' Association is believed to have formed around 1878, and merged to become part of the PIEUA Victorian branch. The Ballarat Typographical Society formed in 1857. It was a small and conservative group, which avoided amalgamations until it merged to become part of the PIEUA Victorian branch.

The PIEUA merged with the Amalgamated Printing Trades Employees' Union of Australia in 1966 to form the Printing and Kindred Industries Union (PKIU).
