= Joe de Bruyn =

Australian trade union official (born 1949)

Joseph de Bruyn AO (born 10 September 1949) is an Australian trade union official. He is the former National President of the Shop, Distributive and Allied Employees Association (SDA) and a former member of the National Executive of the Australian Labor Party (ALP).

De Bruyn served as the SDA's National Secretary from 1978 to 2014. He was formerly the National President.

== Early life and education ==
De Bruyn was born in Roosendaal in the Netherlands in 1949. He migrated to Australia with his parents at the age of seven in 1956, and grew up in rural Victoria. He obtained a Bachelor of Agricultural Science from the University of Melbourne, and went on to study for a PhD in agricultural economics at the University of Sydney but did not complete the degree. He is married with four children, and lives in Melbourne, Victoria.

== Career ==
=== Australian trade union movement and Labor ===
As the national head of the SDA, de Bruyn had considerable influence in Australian trade union and political affairs. This was particularly so in Labor as delegations to the various State and Territory bodies that control party policy and pre-selections for State and Federal Parliaments are decided on a pro-rata basis of union members affiliated to the party.

De Bruyn strongly supported the ACTU's 'Rights at Work' campaign against the Howard Government's industrial relations laws passed in 2005. The union is a significant contributor to Labor election campaigns, according to Australian Electoral Commission funding disclosure returns.

Liberal MP Eric Abetz is quoted as saying "Joe de Bruyn is a role model of trade union officialdom. He is the type of official that gives trade unionism a good name."

== Controversies ==
The SDA is associated with the Labor Right, Labor Unity or Centre-Unity grouping or faction of the trade union movement and the Australian Labor Party. It also has a long-established reputation as a supporter of conservative Catholic parliamentarians. De Bruyn, himself a Catholic, is a leading figure in the right wing faction of the trade union movement and the Australian Labor Party. De Bruyn has come under scrutiny for voicing his socially conservative views while being secretary of a trade union and holding a position on the National Executive of Labor, a centre-left political party. He has repeatedly voiced opposition to abortion, and to legalising same-sex marriage.

=== 2011 Anti same sex marriage motion ===
At a quarterly SDA members meeting in February 2011, de Bruyn moved a resolution against gay marriage, without giving any members a chance to speak or vote on the issue. This led to the first instance of members of the SDA speaking out and challenging de Bruyn on his stance on gay marriage. Speaking at an AWU event in 2003, former Labor Prime Minister Gough Whitlam quipped that "Joe de Bruyn is a Dutchman who hates dykes." In response to a 2014 poll with 72 percent support for same-sex marriage, de Bruyn dismissed the figures but refused to poll his members on the issue. He says he "knows they agree with him absolutely. When we talk to our members about out these things they agree with us".

=== 2024 ACU graduation walkout ===
During a graduation ceremony speech at the Australian Catholic University in October 2024, de Bruyn espoused anti-abortion and anti-same-sex marriage views leading to what was described by the ABC as a mass walkout, although the remaining students gave him a standing ovation.

== Honours ==
In 2022, de Bruyn was appointed Officer of the Order of Australia in the 2022 Queen's Birthday Honours for "distinguished service to industrial relations, particularly the trade union sector, for superannuation reform, and to higher education". In 2024, de Bruyn was presented with an honorary degree by the Australian Catholic University.

Trade union offices
Preceded by Joseph T. Hansen	President of the UNI Global Union; 2010–2014	Succeeded by Ann Selin
