= Community and Public Sector Union =

Australian national trade union

CPSU
- CPSU, the Community and Public Sector Union (PSU & SPSF Groups)
- Founded: 1 July 1994
- Headquarters: Haymarket, New South Wales & Exhibition Street, Melbourne
- Location: Australia
- Members: ▲125,464 (as at 31 December 2024)
- Key people: Melissa Donnelly (PSU) and Stewart Little (SPSF), Joint National Secretaries
- Affiliations: ACTU, ALP
- Website: CPSU PSU CPSU SPSF

CPSU, the Community and Public Sector Union (more commonly known as the CPSU) is a national trade union in Australia. The union came was established on 1 July 1994 with the amalgamation of the Public Sector, Professional, Scientific, Research, Technical, Communication, Aviation and Broadcasting Union (PSU) with the State Public Service Federation (SPSF).

== Overview ==
For historical and administrative reason, the CPSU operates through two groups: the SPSF Group and the PSU Group. The SPSF Group (State Public Service Federation) represents the State public sector employees, some former public sector employees, and university professional staff. The PSU Group (Public Services Union) represents Commonwealth government employees, Northern Territory and Australian Capital Territory employees, and employees in former Commonwealth government entities. These groups reflect the pre-existing eligibility and industrial coverage of the amalgamating organisations.

The CPSU has over 120,000 members, with 48,913 members in the PSU Group (which includes the CSIRO Section) and 74,869 members in the State Public Service Federation (SPSF) Group, as of 30 June 2018. The CPSU is affiliated with the Australian Council of Trade Unions (ACTU) and the CPSU PSU Group is affiliated with the Australian Labor Party (ALP).

== CPSU SPSF Group ==
The State Public Service Federation (SPSF Group) was first registered as a federal union on 30 July 1976. Initially, the SPSF covered a limited range of State public sector employees because of constitutional limitations, as it was unclear until the 1980s how widely the SPSF was able to operate, particularly as a party to industrial disputes. Starting with the decision of the High Court in the CYSS case (1983) (on the extent of the conciliation and arbitration power), it appeared that these constraints were eroding. In 1984 the SPSF changed its rules in order that its eligibility paralleled that of the State registered unions that made up the SPSF.

These State unions are called "Associated Bodies". The Associated Bodies have a very long history, extending in most cases from the 19th century. For instance, the Associated Body for the NSW Branch is the Public Service Association of NSW, which celebrated 100 years of existence as a public sector union in NSW, in 1999.

The SPSF Group consists primarily of State public sector unions which are registered in their respective State industrial tribunal. The primary exception is the Victorian Branch which operates completely in the National System since Victoria referred the industrial relations power to the Commonwealth Government in 1996 by the then Premier Jeff Kennett. Other areas of the SPSF membership in the national system are Professional Staff in universities, Disability and Home Care employees who were progressively privatised in NSW, Professional Staff in the Electricity Generation and Distribution sector in NSW, the Land Registry Service in NSW leased from the NSW Land Titles Office, and Administrative and Support Staff employed by TAFE NSW.

- New South Wales – PSA, Public Service Association of NSW
- Queensland – QPSU, Queensland Public Sector Union
- South Australia – PSA, The Public Service Association of SA
- Victoria – the Community and Public Sector Union (SPSF) Victoria (CPSU)
- Western Australia – CSA, Civil Service Association of WA
- Tasmania – SPSF Tasmania
- Western Australian Prison Officers' Union – WAPOU Western Australian Prison Officers Union of Workers

=== CPSU The Professional Staff Union ===
The CPSU SPSF Group uses the branding of "The Professional Staff Union" due to its representation of only professional staff throughout higher education. Along with their Associated Bodies representing administrative and support staff through state-based schools and TAFEs, nationwide the CPSU is the largest union representing public education employees from kindergarten to university.

In NSW, the CPSU's new website is at www.cpsunsw.org.au/

== CPSU PSU Group ==
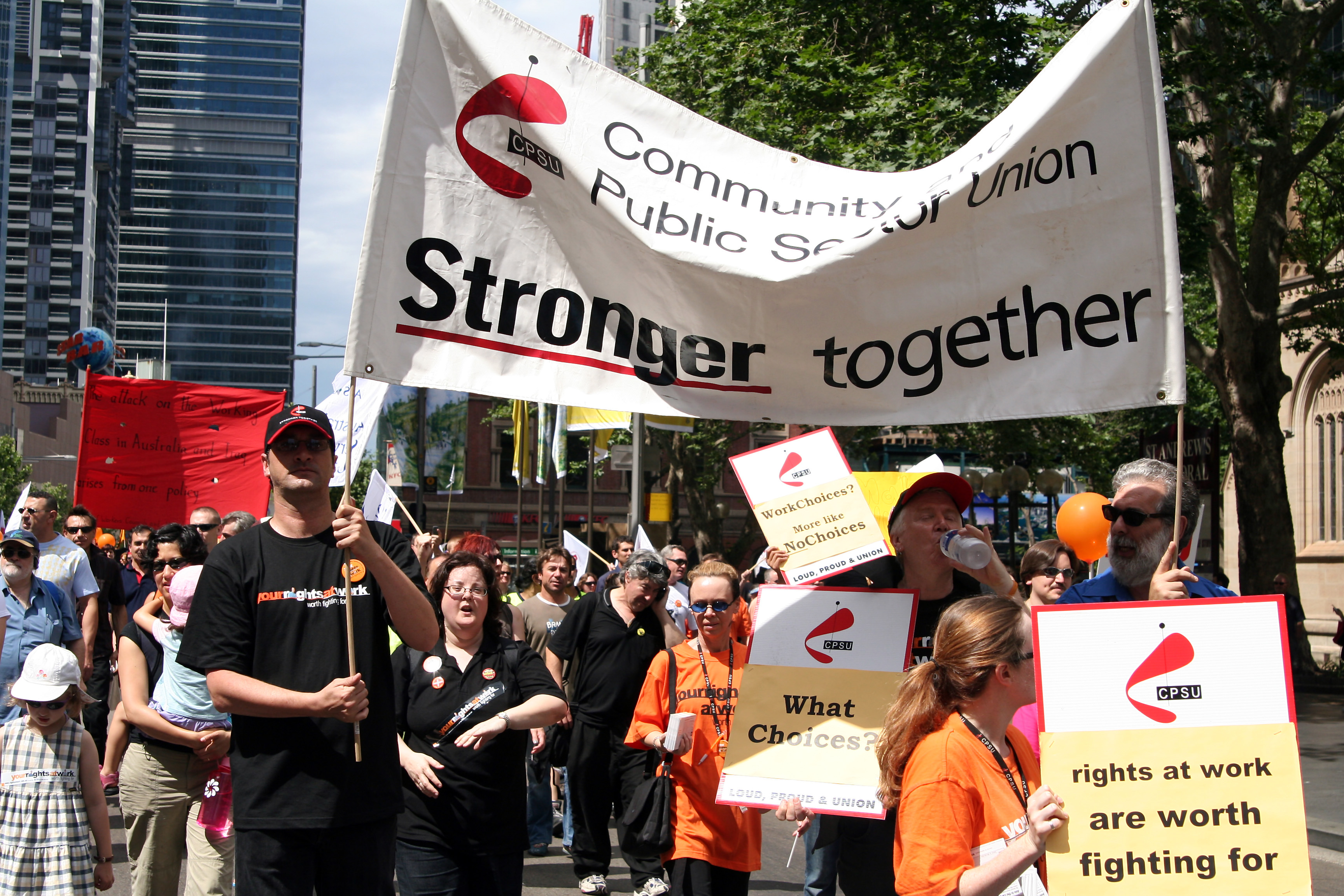
CPSU members at a protest rally in Sydney, in 2005

The PSU Group represents commonwealth or federal public sector employees as well as territory public service employees (ACT and NT). The PSU group also includes members employed in businesses previously part of the Australian public sector, prior to privatisation (e.g. Telstra, CSL). The PSU group was formed through the amalgamation of a number of public sector unions in the late 1980s and early 1990s, including:

- Australian Public Service Association
- Administrative and Clerical Officers' Association
- Australian Broadcasting Corporation Staff Union
- Meat Inspectors' Association
- Australian Government Lawyers' Association
- Professional Officers Association
- Association of Health Professionals (Commonwealth Public Service)
- Professional Radio and Electronics Institute
- CSIRO Staff Association
