= Michele O'Neil =

Australian trade unionist

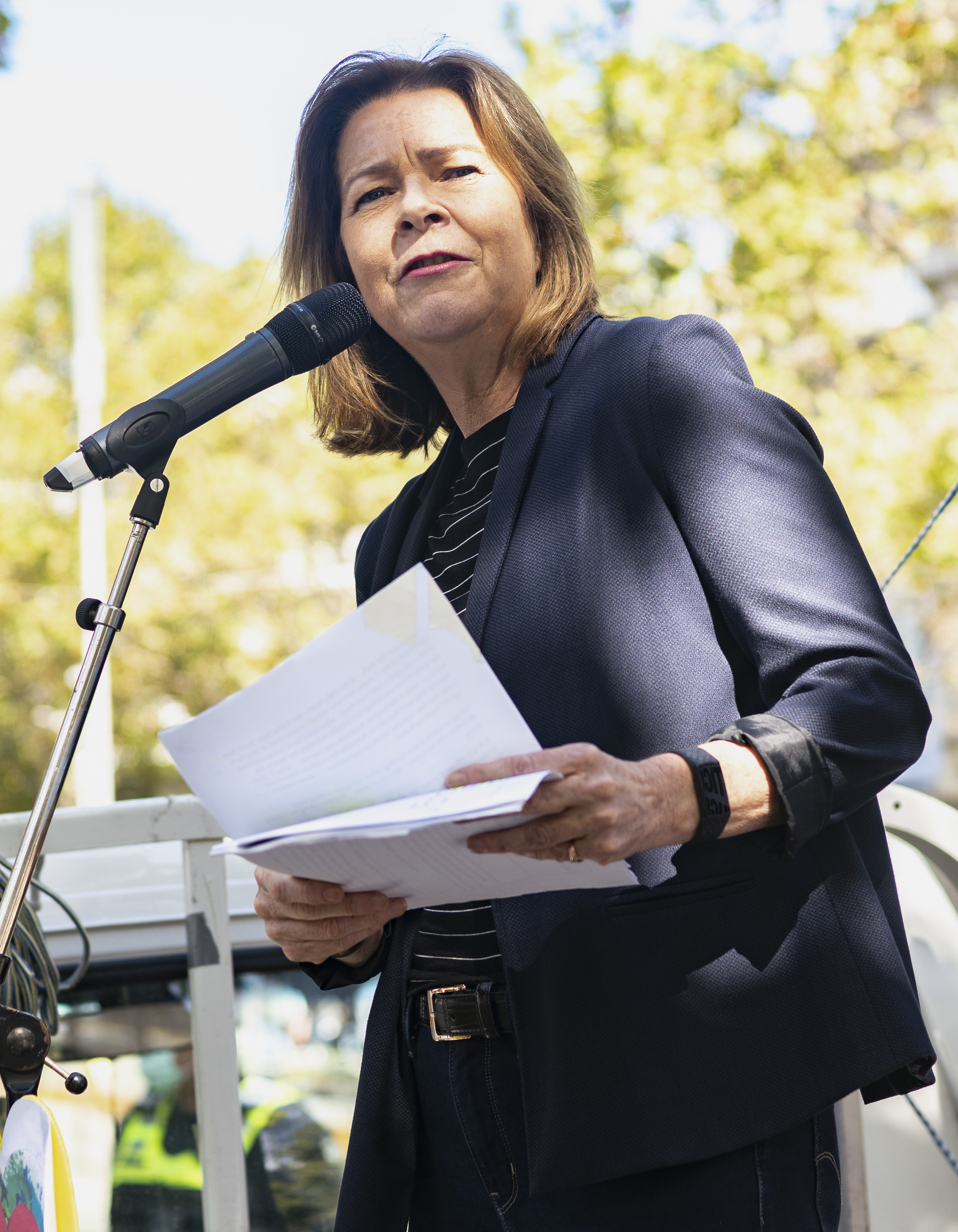
- O'Neil speaking at the 2021 Palm Sunday refugee rally in Melbourne.

11th President of the Australian Council of Trade Unions
- Incumbent
- Assumed office 28 July 2018
- Preceded by: Ged Kearney

Personal details
- Born: Michele O'Neil; 1962 (age 63–64) Melbourne, Victoria, Australia
- Party: Labor
- Profession: Union official

Michele O'Neil is an Australian trade unionist, She has been president of the Australian Council of Trade Unions (ACTU) since 2018.

== Early life and education ==
Born in Melbourne, Michele O'Neil is the youngest of five daughters. Her mother left school at 13 to work in a tannery in Melbourne and worked as a waitress, and in various other casual jobs while raising her children. O'Neil's father served in the army, before serving as a public servant and briefly as an Australian Football League administrator.

O'Neil credited her parents and four older sisters with introducing her to social justice causes by taking her to the Aboriginal Tent Embassy in Canberra when she was just 10 and to protest marches as a teenager in support of freeing imprisoned South African anti-Apartheid leader Nelson Mandela.

== Career ==
=== Early career ===
O'Neil served for 28 years as an organiser, campaigner, negotiator, and later state branch and national secretary of the Textile, Clothing and Footwear Union of Australia. In 2018 she led her union into an amalgamation with the CFMEU and MUA and became a CFMEU Vice President.

In 2004, she told union members to consider cutting ties with the Australian Labor Party (ALP) over tariff cuts in the clothing, footwear and textiles industries. She criticised the Gillard government in 2012, claiming they were "undercutting" workers in the textile industry by reducing funding to the TCF Structural Adjustment Program, a support mechanism for redundant workers in the sector seeking alternative employment.

=== ACTU president ===
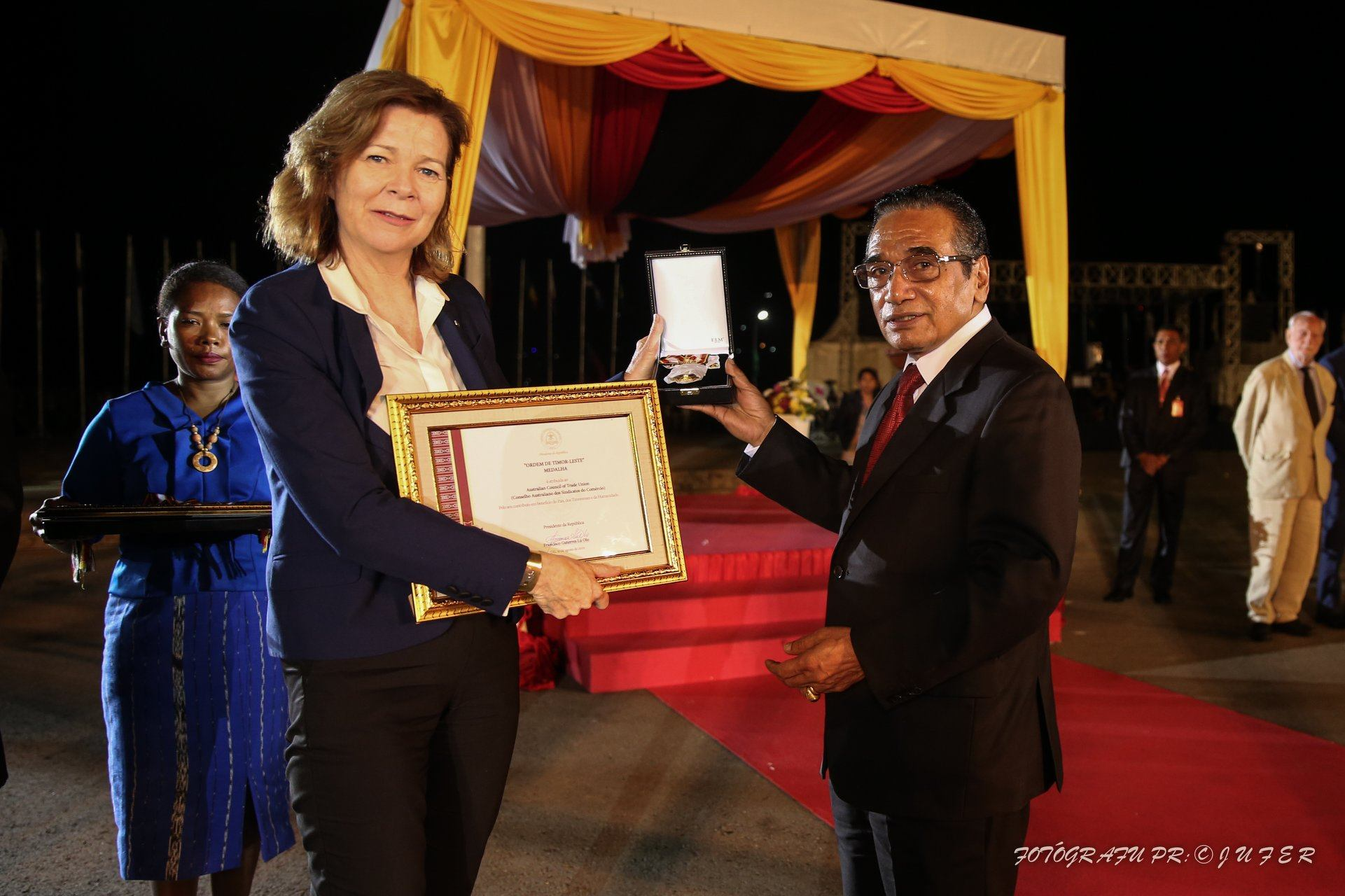
O'Neil receiving the Order of Timor-Leste on behalf of the ACTU from Francisco Guterres in 2019

In 2018, O'Neil was elected president of the Australian Council of Trade Unions (ACTU). In her first speech as the new president of the ACTU, O'Neil spoke publicly for the first time about being sexually harassed as a teenage waitress, saying that the collective response of her fellow union members and the discipline of her delegate solidified her confidence in unionism as a young employee.

In August 2019, O'Neil, on behalf of the ACTU, received the Order of Timor-Leste from Francisco Guterres at celebrations marking the 20th anniversary of the East Timorese independence referendum.

Together with Sally McManus, O'Neil and McManus were the first all-female leadership pair of the ACTU, playing a major role in getting Australian legislation enacted for the right to disconnect and criminalising wage theft, and achieving more rights for gig economy employees. Under the leadership of O'Neil and McManus, the Construction, Forestry and Maritime Employees Union, alleged to be male-dominated and have criminal infiltration, was suspended.

O'Neil announced that she would resign as president of the ACTU before the end of 2026. O'Neil said that part of the reason for her resignation was that union membership was starting to grow.

== Other roles and activities ==
In September 2021, O'Neil was appointed as a director of superannuation fund AustralianSuper, having previously served as an alternate director.

She has addressed the National Press Club several times, including in 2021, 2023, and 2024.

O'Neil was appointed by the Albanese government to the Net Zero Economy Authority board in 2024 and the National Workplace Relations Consultative Council in 2025. Both roles are due to expire in 2027.

In April 2026, O'Neil she was interviewed in an episode of Workers' Voices on the International Labour Organization's YouTube channel.

== Recognition ==
Australian prime minister Anthony Albanese described O'Neil and Sally McManus as "giants of the labour movement".
