= Australian Council of Trade Unions =

Australian national trade union organisation

ACTU
- Australian Council of Trade Unions
- Predecessor: Federal Council of the Commonwealth Labour Federation (1902–1913); Commonwealth Council of Federated Unions (1923–1927)
- Founded: May 1927; 99 years ago
- Type: Trade Union Centre
- Headquarters: 365 Queen Street
- Location: Melbourne, Victoria
- Region served: Australia
- President: Michele O'Neil
- Secretary: Melissa Donnelly
- Main organ: ACTU Congress
- Affiliations: International Trade Union Confederation
- Website: actu.org.au australianunions.org.au
- Formerly called: Australasian Council of Trade Unions (1927–1947)

The Australian Council of Trade Unions (ACTU), also known as "Australian Unions" is the largest peak body representing workers in Australia. It is a national trade union centre of 46 affiliated unions and eight trades and labour councils. The ACTU is a member of the International Trade Union Confederation.

The President of the ACTU is Michele O'Neil, who was elected on 28 July 2018. The current Secretary is Melissa Donnelly.

== Objectives ==
The objectives of the ACTU include:

- the socialisation of industry;
- Organisation of the Australian workforce through unions;
- the utilisation of Australian resources to maintain full employment, establish equitable living standards which increase in line with output, and create opportunities for the development of talent.

== Organisation ==
=== Executive ===
Elected officers
Position	Name	Union	Term start	Time in office	Ref
Secretary	Melissa Donnelly	CPSU	28 August 2026	70 days	
President	Michele O'Neil	TCFUA; CFMEU	28 July 2018	8 years, 101 days	
Assistant secretary	Liam O'Brien	AWU	10 December 2018	7 years, 331 days	
Assistant secretary	Joseph Mitchell	UWU	15 May 2023	3 years, 175 days	
Senior vice president	Gerard Dwyer	SDA			

Vice presidents
Position	Name	Union
Vice president	Lauren Hutchins	HSU
Vice president	Steven Murphy	AMWU
Vice president	Michael Kaine	TWU
Vice president	Annie Butler	ANMF
Vice president	Correna Haythorpe	AEU

== History ==
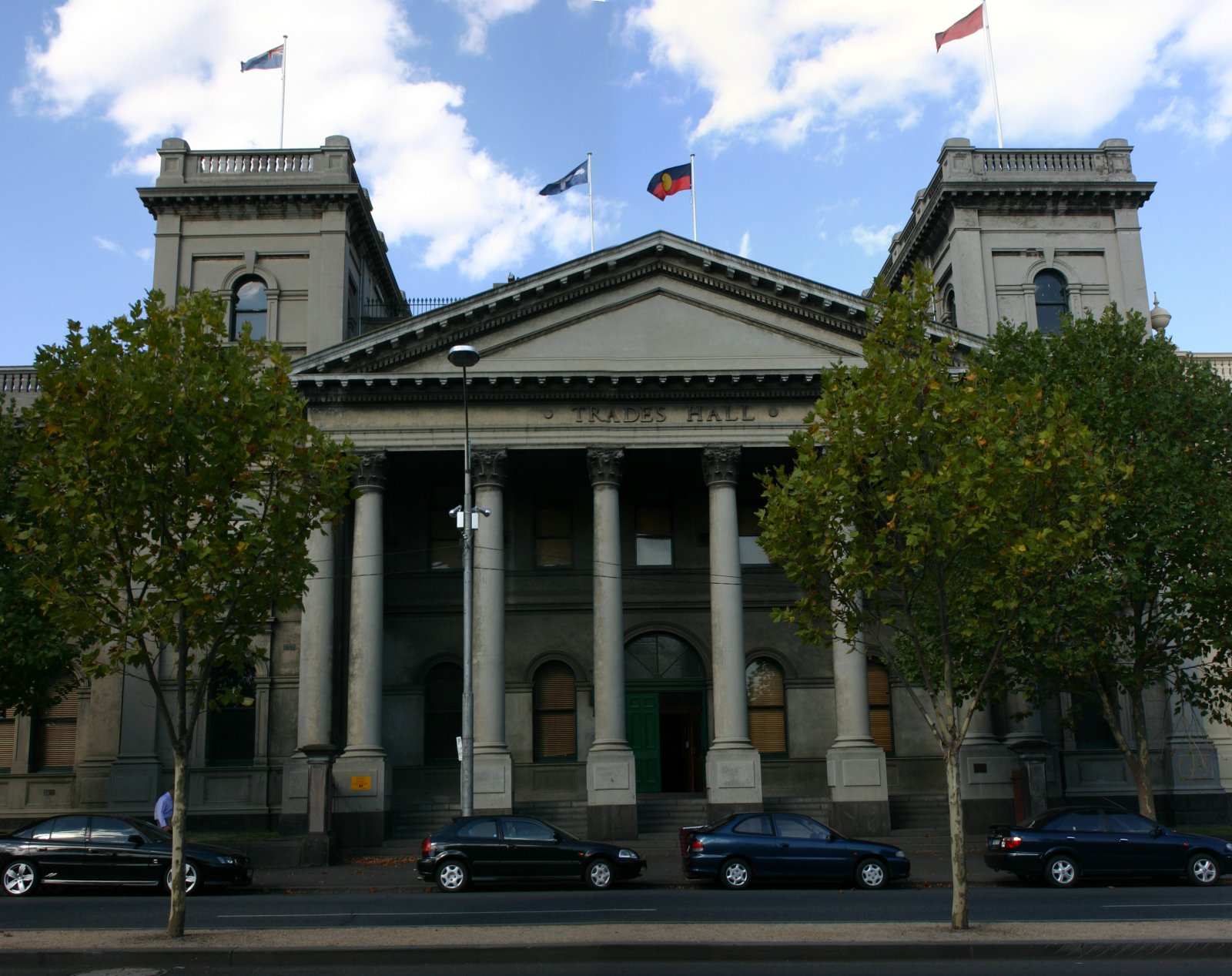
Melbourne Trades Hall in Victoria is the "birthplace" of the ACTU.

In Australia, agitation for One Big Union took place from 1911 from two different sectors: from the revolutionary Australian section of the IWW and from the pro-arbitration Australian Workers Union (AWU). At that time the AWU was the largest single Australian union. In 1918 after the collapse of the Australian IWW, a group of militant trade unions (which were opposed to the AWU) attempted to form One Big Union under the name Workers Industrial Union of Australia (WIUA). The hostility between the WIUA and the AWU prevented the formation of One Big Union in Australia. The ACTU was formed as the Australasian Council of Trade Unions in 1927 and was one of the earliest attempts by trade unions to apply the principles of One Big Union earlier explored by more radical syndicalist unions like the CNT or revolutionary industrial unions like the IWW. The ACTU has not achieved the ideals expressed for One Big Union: it remains a council organisation, but it does however represent the majority of Australian trade unions. At its formation in 1927 the ACTU was only seen as representing blue collar trades unions, and only managed to achieve the support of trades unions.

Attempts of Nationalist Stanley Bruce's federal government in 1927 to dismantle the Australian Industrial Relations Commission impelled Australian trade unions to form a national council. The ACTU's Australian trade union "peak body" precursors include state labour councils like the Victorian Trades Hall Council (originating in 1856 as the "Melbourne Trades Hall Committee"), the Labor Council of New South Wales (originally formed in 1870 as the "Sydney Trades and Labor Council") and the Inter-Colonial Trade Union Congress (formed in 1879).

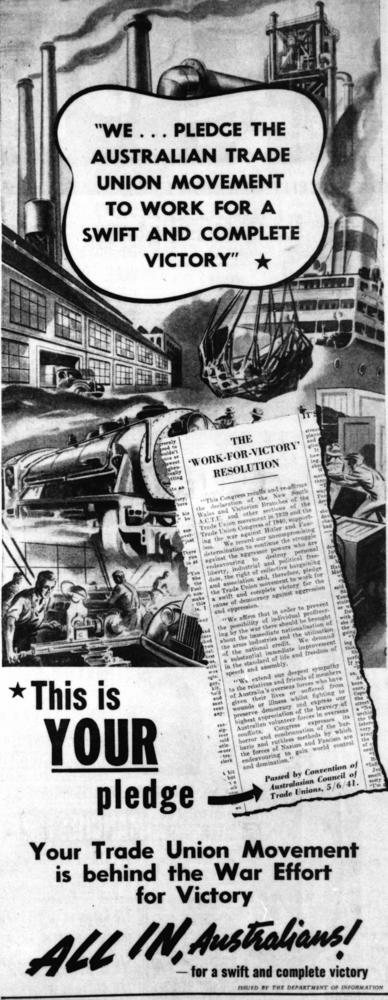
The Work For Victory Pledge affirmed by the ACTU, as depicted in the West Australian newspaper, 17 June 1941

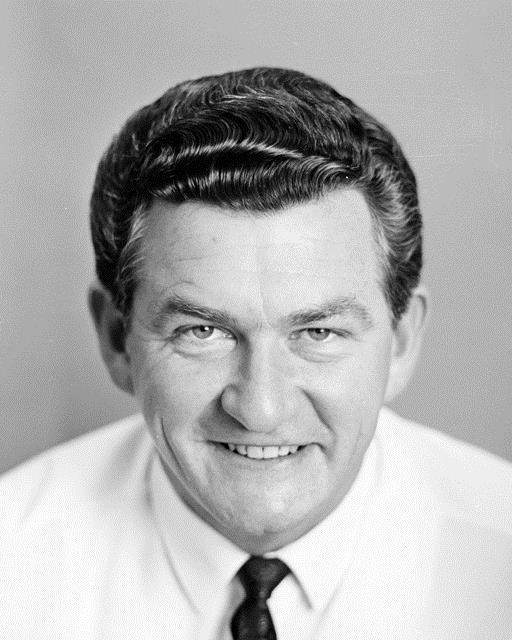
Bob Hawke, ACTU President in 1970

From 1948 peak bodies of white collar associations existed, and from 1969 peak bodies of government employees. The white collar bodies were: the Council of Professional and Commercial Employees Association (1948), which became the Council of White Collar Associations (1954), which amalgamated with the Salaried Employees Consultative Council of New South Wales (1954) to become the Australian Council of Salaried and Professional Associations (ACSPA) in 1956. The government employee bodies were: the Council of Commonwealth Public Service Organisations (1969) which became the Council of Australian Government Employee Organisations (CAGEO) in 1975. The ACTU successfully integrated these bodies in 1981. After 1981 the ACTU was generally viewed by the Australian media and public as the organisation representing all workers' organisations.

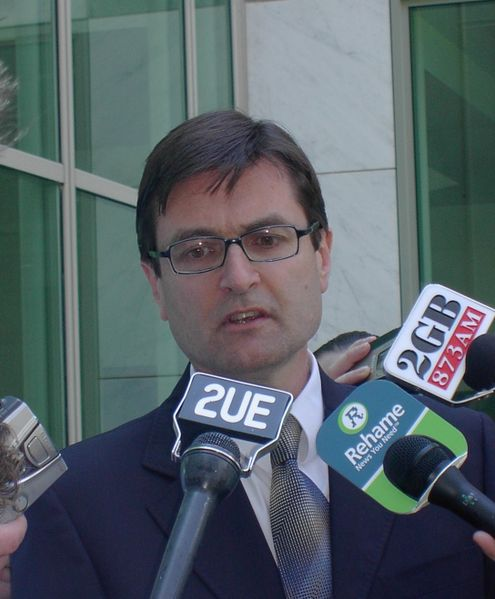
Greg Combet, then-Secretary of the ACTU, speaking on 2 November 2005 shortly after the Government introduced its WorkChoices legislation into the Australian Parliament

The ACTU and Labour Councils have often united Australian working class opinion behind certain initiatives like the eight-hour day or compulsory arbitration. In the early 1980s this unifying impulse created the Prices and Incomes Accord. The ACTU retains a close relationship with the Australian Labor Party: former ACTU President Bob Hawke went on to become the leader of the ALP and then Prime Minister of Australia. Other former ACTU Presidents who went on to become members of Federal Parliament are: Simon Crean (president 1985–90), Martin Ferguson (1990–96), Jennie George (1996–99), and Ged Kearney (2010–18). The November 2007 election win by the Labor Party, saw the election of a number of union officials to the parliament (Commonwealth) including Bill Shorten (Australian Workers Union) and Greg Combet (former ACTU Secretary).

In the late 1980s and early 1990s the ACTU was influential in a move to forcibly amalgamate smaller unions into so called "super unions". The ACTU's plans envisaged 20 super unions organised on an industrial basis. While many amalgamations occurred in the late 1980s and early 1990s (in part under the influence of changed industrial law), there are still many unions, and union coverage is often organised by historical amalgamation, not by industry.

In 2026, McManus and O'Neil announced their resignations from their respective posts. McManus's resignation is to take effect from 31 August and O'Neil's will take effect before the end of the year. Secretary of the Community and Public Sector Union (CPSU) Melissa Donnelly has been announced as the next secretary of the ACTU.

== National campaigns ==
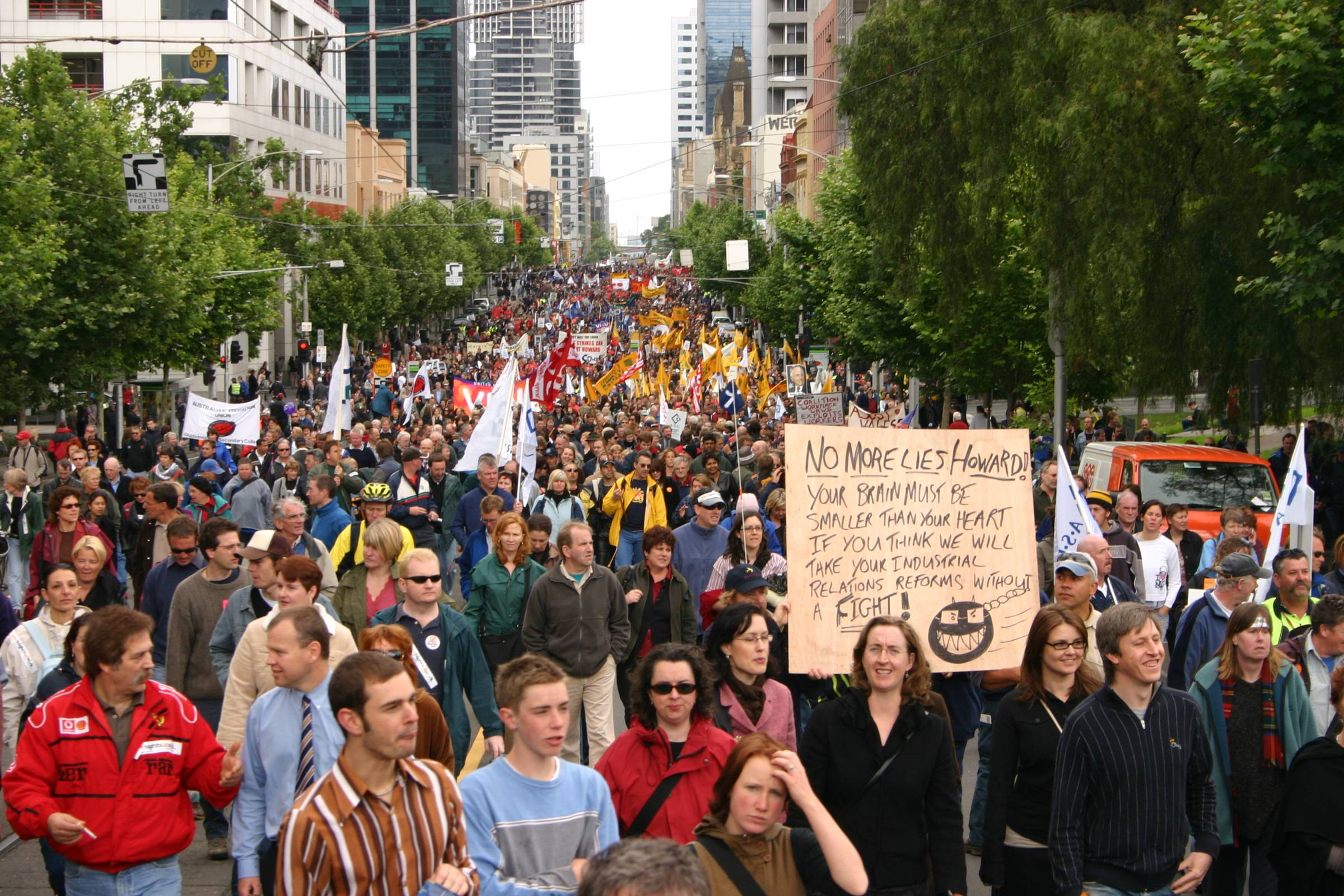
Australian union members protesting against WorkChoices in Melbourne, November 2005

In the lead up to the 2007 federal election, the ACTU campaigned actively against the Howard government's WorkChoices legislation, which included an advertising campaign and public rallies. This campaign was originally called "Your Rights at Work" but is now known as "Secure Jobs. Better Future" and was considered a success in making industrial relations an important election issue by both marketing companies and even MP Joe Hockey, the Federal Workplace Relations Minister, who said "This is the most sophisticated political plan that we have seen in Australia." One of the rallies was called Fill the "G" , attended by 50,000 people at the Melbourne Cricket Ground and broadcast to other similar rallies throughout the country. A previous national rally had a reported attendance of 500,000 around Australia.

The ACTU's current campaigns include the campaign to win paid pandemic leave for all workers in response to the COVID-19 pandemic, the For the workers campaign to oppose Commonwealth Government proposals to change Australian workplace laws, and the promotion of a Working from home Charter.

Following the 2007 Australian federal election, the ACTU's primary focus was the campaign to restore workers rights under the banner of the Your Rights at Work campaign. In addition to this campaign, the ACTU also ran a number of other campaigns, including workplace health and safety, working with other unions on the Your Rights at Telstra campaign and supporting the Rights on Site campaign.

The ACTU has also launched a service by which workers can join their applicable union directly through the ACTU. This self-titled "one stop shop" for union membership is Australian Unions.

In 2008, the ACTU launched a campaign to make paid maternity leave a new national employment standard.

In 2011, the ACTU launched a campaign to address the spread of casual, contract and other forms of insecure work in Australian workplaces. Part of this involved an inquiry into insecure work.

In 2023, the ACTU and other big unions, including the Health Services Union and the Australian Manufacturing Workers' Union, began a campaign calling for a levy to be imposed on non-union workers after the union was able to raise wages through collective bargaining.

== Leadership ==
=== Presidents ===
	Name	Term start	Term end	Time	Other offices held
1	Billy Duggan	1927	1934	7 years	Councillor for the City of Coburg (1924–30); President of Melbourne Trades Hall Council (1926–1927); Mayor of Coburg (1928–29); President of the Victorian Labor Party (1928–1929)
2	Albert Monk, CMG	1934	1943	9 years	Secretary of the Melbourne Trades Hall Council (1933–1938); 2nd Secretary of the ACTU
3	Percy Clarey	1943	1949	6 years	Member of the Victorian Legislative Council (1937–1949); Member of the Australian House of Representatives for Bendigo (1949–60)
(2)	Albert Monk, CMG	1949	1969	20 years	
4	Bob Hawke, AC, GCL	1969	1980	11 years	Member of the Australian House of Representatives for Wills (1980–92); President of the Labor Party (1973–78); Leader of the Labor Party (1983–91); Leader of the Opposition (1983); Prime Minister (1983–91).
5	Cliff Dolan, AO	1980	1985	5 years	
6	Simon Crean, AC	1985	1990	5 years	Member of the Australian House of Representatives for Hotham (1990–2013); Deputy Leader of the Labor Party (1998–2001); Leader of the Labor Party and Leader of the Opposition (2001–03)
7	Martin Ferguson, AM	1990	1996	6 years	Member of the Australian House of Representatives for Batman (1996–2013)
8	Jennie George, AO	1996	2000	4 years	Member of the Australian House of Representatives for Throsby (2001–10)
9	Sharan Burrow, AC	2000	2010	10 years	President of International Confederation of Free Trade Unions (2004–06); President of International Trade Union Confederation (2006–10); General Secretary of International Trade Union Confederation (2010–2022)
10	Ged Kearney	1 July 2010	2 February 2018	7 years, 216 days	Member of the Australian House of Representatives for Batman (2018–19) and Cooper (2019–present)
11	Michele O'Neil	17 July 2018	Incumbent	8 years, 112 days	

=== Secretaries ===
	Name	Term start	Term end	Time	Other offices held
1	Charlie Crofts	1927	1943	16 years	President of Melbourne Trades Hall Council (1924–1925); President of the Victorian Labor Party (1926–27)
2	Albert Monk, CMG	1943	1949	6 years	2nd President of the ACTU
3	Reg Broadby	1949	1956	7 years	President of the Melbourne Trades Hall Council (1944–45), President of the Victorian Labor Party (1949–50)
4	Harold Souter AO	1956	1977	21 years	
5	Peter Nolan	1977	1983	6 years	Commissioner of the Australian Industrial Relations Commission (1984–1997)
6	Bill Kelty, AC	1983	2000	17 years	
7	Greg Combet, AM	2000	2007	7 years	Member of the Australian House of Representatives for Charlton (2007–13)
8	Jeff Lawrence	2007	2012	5 years	Vice President of the New South Wales Labor Party (2002–07)
9	Dave Oliver	24 May 2012	15 March 2017	5 years	
10	Sally McManus	15 March 2017	28 August 2026	9 years	
10	Melissa Donnelly	28 August 2026	Incumbent	70 days	

== Affiliated trade and labour councils ==
Eight trade and labour councils are affiliated with the ACTU:

Location	Organisation Name	Alternate Name	Founded	Members
New South Wales	Labor Council of New South Wales	Unions NSW	1871	600,000
(Victoria (state)) Victoria	Victorian Trades Hall Council	We Are Union	1856	500,000
Queensland	Queensland Council of Unions	Queensland Unions	1885	400,000
South Australia	SA Unions		1884	160,000
Western Australia	Unions WA		1891	150,000
Tasmania	Tasmanian Trades & Labor Council	Unions Tasmania	1883	50,000
Australian Capital Territory	Trades and Labour Council of the Australian Capital Territory	Unions ACT	1931	33,000
Northern Territory	Northern Territory Trades & Labor Council	Unions NT	1973	15,000

== Current affiliated organisations ==
- Australasian Meat Industry Employees Union
- Australian and International Pilots Association
- Australian Education Union
- Australian Institute of Marine and Power Engineers
- Australian Licensed Aircraft Engineers Association
- Australian Manufacturing Workers Union
- Australian Maritime Officers Union
- Australian Nursing and Midwifery Federation
- Australian Salaried Medical Officers Federation
- Australian Services Union
- Australian Workers' Union
- Breweries & Bottleyards Employees Industrial Union of Workers WA
- Civil Air Operations Officers' Association of Australia
- Club Managers Association Australia
- Community and Public Sector Union
- Finance Sector Union
- Flight Attendants' Association of Australia
- Health Services Union
- Independent Education Union of Australia
- Media, Entertainment and Arts Alliance
- Mining and Energy Union
- National Tertiary Education Union
- Police Association of New South Wales
- Professional Footballers Australia
- Professionals Australia
- Australian Rail Tram and Bus Industry Union
- Shop, Distributive and Allied Employees Association
- Transport Workers Union of Australia
- Union of Christmas Island Workers
- United Firefighters Union of Australia
- United Workers Union

== Dis-affiliated organisations ==
In 2024, the Communications, Electrical and Plumbing Union of Australia disaffiliated from the ACTU, citing the latter's support for the Construction, Forestry and Maritime Employees Union (CFMEU) being placed into administration by the Federal Government. The CFMEU had been suspended from the ACTU and the Australian Labor Party following allegations of criminal misconduct in its construction division.

== Honours and awards ==
- 2019: Medal of the Order of Timor-Leste | For the union movement of Australia, who showed solidarity in the face of our struggle and contributed to the process of self-determination for the Timorese people.

== See also ==
- 1998 Australian waterfront dispute
- Australian Fair Pay Commission
- Australian labour law
- Australian workplace agreement
- Competition and Consumer Act 2010
- Enterprise bargaining agreement
- Employers' organization
- List of unregistered Australian unions
- Trades hall
- Transport Workers Act 1928
- Workplace Relations Act 1996
