= Superannuation Industry (Supervision) Act 1993 =

Australian labour law

Parliament of Australia
- Long title: An Act to make provision for the supervision of certain entities engaged in the superannuation industry, and for related purposes
- Citation: No. 78, 1993
- Assented to by: Governor-General Bill Hayden
- Assented to: 30 November 1993

Legislative history
- Bill title: Superannuation Industry (Supervision) Act 1993
- Status: Amended

The Superannuation Industry (Supervision) Act 1993 (SIS Act) is an Australian labour law statute that regulates superannuation in Australia. The act gives a high degree of regulation to Self-Managed Super Funds (SMSFs), retail superannuation funds and industry superannuation funds. The act stipulates that a customer of a superannuation fund is not the owner of that money but the beneficiary, with the fund acting as a trustee on the customer's behalf. The act also stipulates how taxation on superannuation works.

== Self-Managed Super Funds ==
The Superannuation Industry (Supervision) Act 1993 tightly regulates Self-Managed Superannuation Funds (SMSFs). It sets out how a Corporate Trustee for an SMSF should be formed. SMSFs are also regulated by sections 62, 66 and 67A, the first of these sections mandates that the SMSF only provide members with benefits after retirement and death.

The SIS Act lays out the penalties for contravening the requirements of the legislation, these allow the Australian Taxation Office (ATO) to accept an enforceable undertaking from trustees to rectify the error, seek civil or criminal penalties against the trustee, disqualify individuals from acting as trustees, suspend or remove a trustee from the fund, or designate the fund as "non-complying" by issuing a notice of non-compliance.

== See also ==
- Pensions in the United Kingdom
