= Patrick Stevedores Operations No 2 Pty Ltd v Maritime Union of Australia =

Australian labour law case

- Court: High Court of Australia
- Decided: 4 May 1998
- Citations: [1998] HCA 30, (1998) 195 CLR 1

Court membership
- Judges sitting: Gaudron, McHugh, Gummow, Kirby, Hayne & Callinan JJ

Patrick Stevedores Operations No 2 Pty Ltd v Maritime Union of Australia [1998] HCA 30 is an Australian labour law case in the High Court which culminated the legal aspects of the 1998 Australian waterfront dispute, in which a major stevedoring operation, the Patrick group of companies, sought to replace its largely unionised workforce with a non-union workforce.

== Facts ==
The company, Patrick Stevedores applied for special leave to appeal from a decision of the Full Court of the Federal Court of Australia, which itself was an appeal from a decision by Justice Tony North of the Federal Court upon an application for urgent interlocutory relief which had been brought by the Maritime Union of Australia. The notice of motion seeking the interlocutory orders from North J was filed on 6 April 1998, and the litigation went from that original step to a decision of the High Court within a single month.

The orders made by North J sought to unravel a set of arrangements which had been made within the Patrick group of companies, arrangements which were found to give rise to an arguable case that there had been a conspiracy to injure the MUA members in their employment, contrary to the protections of the Workplace Relations Act 1996. Those orders were upheld on appeal to the Full Court of the Federal Court.

== Judgment ==
The High Court upheld the substance of the orders, but modified them to acknowledge that ultimately it was a question for the administrators of the company whether it resumed trading.

== See also ==
- Australian labour law
