= Australian labour law =

Rights and duties of workers, unions and employers in Australia

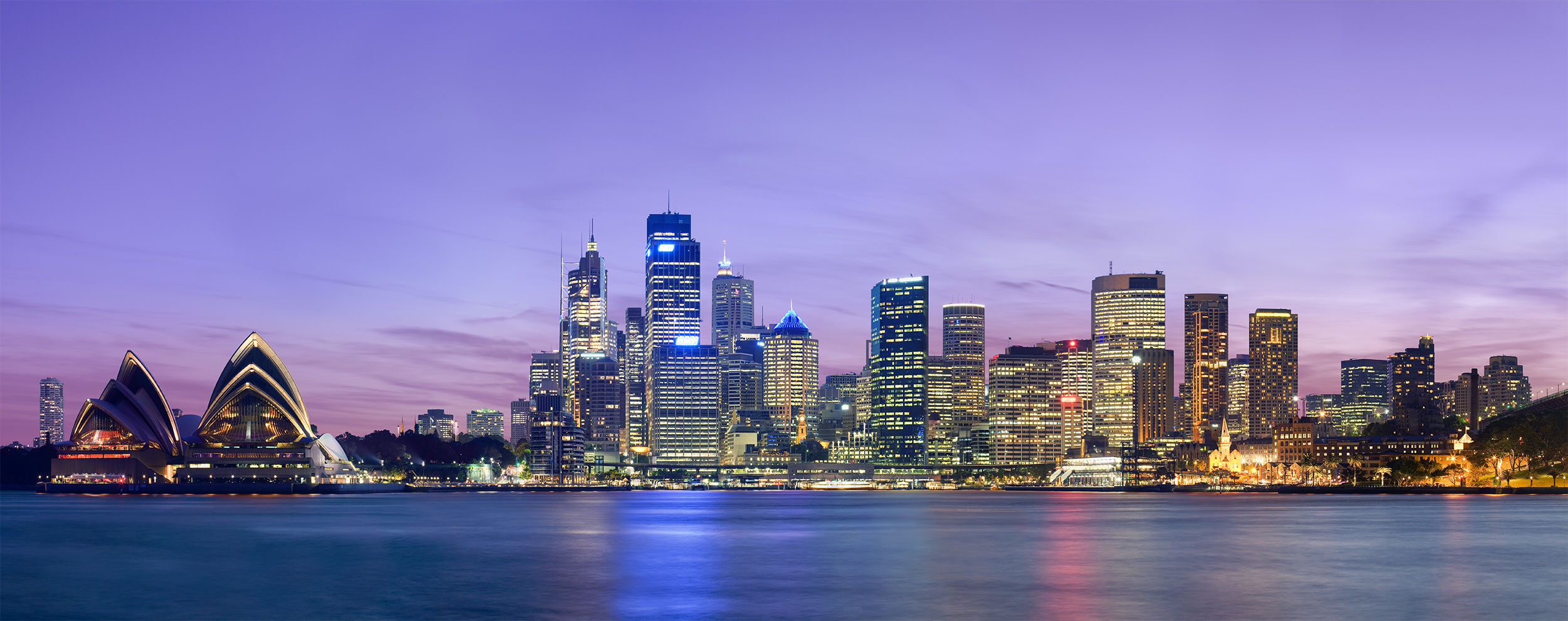
In 2023, Australia's labour force was 14.2 million, with 1.4 million trade union members, an average annual income of $72,753, 3.8% unemployment and 6.4% underemployment.

Australian labour law sets the rights of working people, the role of trade unions, and democracy at work, and the duties of employers, across the Commonwealth and in states. Under the Fair Work Act 2009, the Fair Work Commission creates a national minimum wage and oversees National Employment Standards for fair hours, holidays, parental leave and job security. The FWC also creates modern awards that apply to most sectors of work, numbering 150 in 2024, with minimum pay scales, and better rights for overtime, holidays, paid leave, and superannuation for a pension in retirement.

Beyond this floor of rights, trade unions and employers often create enterprise bargaining agreements for better wages and conditions in their workplaces. In 2024, collective agreements covered 15% of employees, while 22% of employees were classified as "casual", meaning that they lose many protections other workers have. Australia's laws on the right to take collective action are among the most restrictive in the developed world, and Australia does not have a general law protecting workers' rights to vote and elect worker directors on corporation boards as do most other wealthy OECD countries.

Equal treatment at work is underpinned by a patchwork of legislation from the Fair Work Act 2009, Racial Discrimination Act 1975, Sex Discrimination Act 1984, Disability Discrimination Act 1992, Age Discrimination Act 2004 and a host of state laws, with complaints possible to the Fair Work Commission, the Australian Human Rights Commission, and state-based regulators. Despite this system, structural inequality from unequal parental leave and responsibility, segregated occupations, and historic patterns of xenophobia mean that the gender pay gap remains at 22%, while the Indigenous pay gap remains at 33%. These inequalities usually intersect with each other, and combine with overall inequality of income and security.

The laws for job security include reasonable notice before dismissal, the right to a fair reason before dismissal, and redundancy payments. However many of these protections are reduced for casual employees, or employees in smaller workplaces. The Commonwealth government, through fiscal policy, and the Reserve Bank of Australia, through monetary policy, are meant to guarantee full employment but in recent decades the previous commitment to keeping unemployment around 2% or lower has not been fulfilled. Australia shares similarities with higher income countries, and implements some International Labour Organization conventions.

== History ==
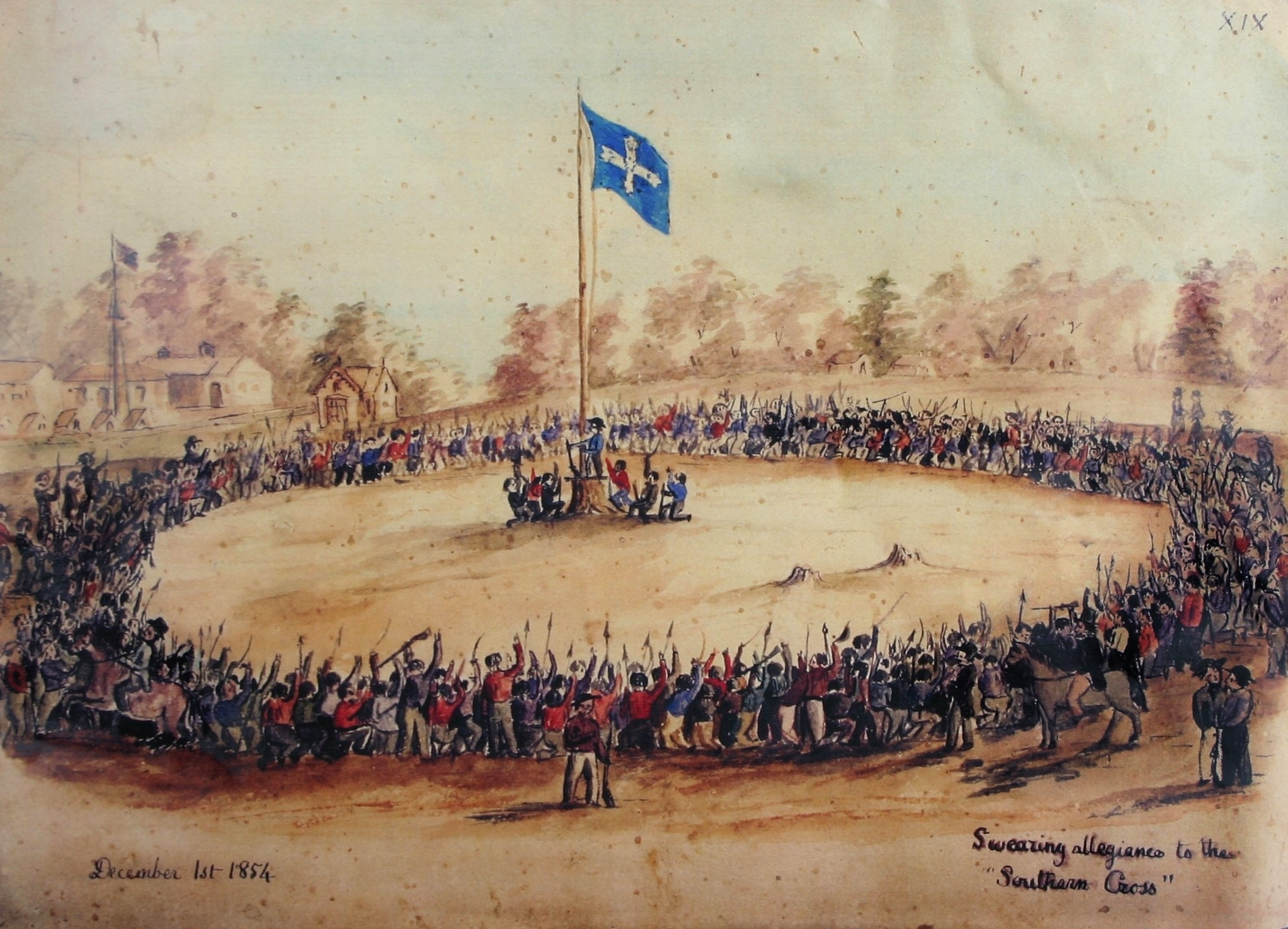
The right to work, without punitive fees, was violently suppressed during the Eureka Stockade of 1854, but in the aftermath the gold miners won democratic representation in Victoria's parliament.

Australia's first federal labour rights followed the Constitution of Australia in 1901, yet the law had long regulated work in colonies, often violently suppressing labour freedom. The land of Australia was forcibly settled by British Empire migrants, who anchored in Botany Bay and then declared they held possession of the eastern continent in 1780. After losing territory to the United States in the American War of Independence, Britain established a penal colony of 1400 settlers and convicts in Sydney in 1788. Before colonisation, there were around 1.2 million Indigenous Australians, but contact with European settlers killed up to 80% of people through smallpox and other diseases. In the Australian frontier wars over the next century, around 115,000 Indigenous people were massacred or killed, particularly in Queensland. Indigenous Australian labour was typically organised on hunter-gathering lines, and was cooperative within and between tribes, and through trade among national groups. By contrast, British labour was primarily forced, with a constant supply of prisoners from the British Isles whose crimes were often related to poverty or trying to seek better wages. For example, in R v Lovelass a group of five farm workers in Tolpuddle, Dorset had organised a trade union, because their wages were cut from nine shillings to a starvation wage of six shillings a week. They were convicted under the Unlawful Oaths Act 1797 and Unlawful Societies Act 1799 and sentenced to transportation to Sydney. Mass popular support and protest meant that these five became known as the Tolpuddle martyrs, and they were eventually pardoned. The population tripled to more than a million migrants over the Australian gold rushes of 1851, and protests broke out against the government's attempt to impose a licence fee for working to search for gold (whether or not gold was found). In 1854, when the fee was £2 for 3 months, strict and brutal enforcement led to the Eureka Stockade at Ballarat, where rebels demanded an end to the fee, democratic representation in the government, and took up arms. Though the stockade was broken, and its leaders killed or arrested and put on trial, juries acquitted all, the gold licence fee was replaced with an export duty, and miners won the right to vote in the Victorian Legislative Assembly. Yet labour rights throughout Australian colonies were scant. Laws were systematically discriminatory, particularly based on gender and race, entrenched in the White Australia policy from the Immigration Restriction Act 1901. The right to organise unions was precarious, without any positive right to take collective action for fair work, and there were no legislative rights to fair wages or job security. Instead, responding to the 1890 Australian maritime dispute, the 1892 Broken Hill miners' strike and others, South Australia, New Zealand, New South Wales, and finally the federation sought to replace industrial conflict and strikes with a system of arbitration.

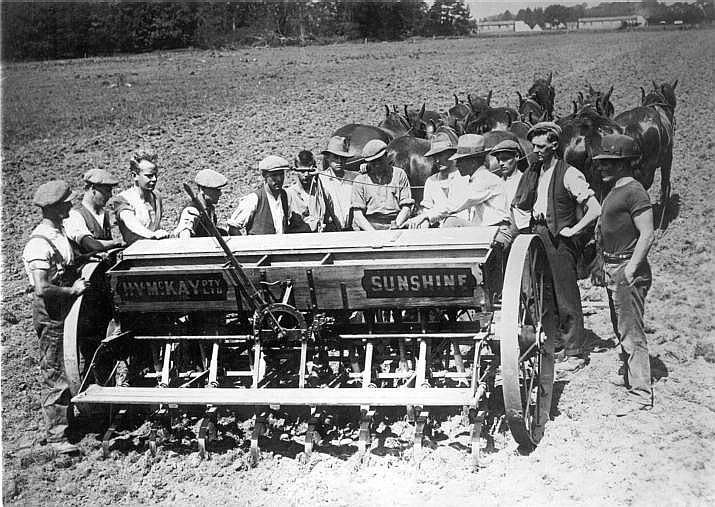
Australia's early laws required "fair and reasonable wages", which the Harvester case said must be enough for "a human being in a civilised community", from a hypothetical collective agreement, or if not employers like HV McKay's Sunshine Harvester Works had to pay a tax on exports.

At Australia's federation in 1901, the Constitution section 51(xxxv) empowered the making of "laws for the peace, order, and good government of the Commonwealth with respect to... conciliation and arbitration for the prevention and settlement of industrial disputes extending beyond the limits of any one state". This was used to pass the Commonwealth Conciliation and Arbitration Act 1904 where a "dispute" would trigger federal jurisdiction between trade unions and employers, and this was meant to make strikes illegal or unnecessary, although in fact strikes remained "not uncommon". The Commonwealth Court of Conciliation and Arbitration (CCCA) could hear disputes, and make "awards" for fair wages and conditions across an industry if there was no agreement reached, or regulate any "industrial matters". With favourable governments in power, some courts were progressive, and in the landmark Harvester case the CCCA determined that the employer, Hugh Victor McKay that made harvesting machinery, was required to pay "fair and reasonable wages", or pay an excise tax on exports, under the Excise Tariff Act 1906. What was "fair and reasonable", said Higgins J depended on "the normal needs of an average employee, regarded as a human being in a civilised community", and this was to be found by imagining a hypothetical collective agreement, not individual bargaining with the "usual, but unequal, contest, the "higgling of the market" for labour, with the pressure for bread on one side and the pressure for profits on the other". This formed the basis of Australian fair work regulation, even though R v Barger in 1908 quickly struck down the Excise Tariff Act 1906, saying the federal tax power could not be used to indirectly regulate working conditions. In 1956, R v Kirby held that the CCCA was an unconstitutional court because it held both judicial and powers to arbitrate disputes. So, to replace the CCCA, a new Commonwealth Conciliation and Arbitration Commission carried out mediation functions, and the Commonwealth Industrial Court assumed its powers and itself merged into the Federal Court of Australia in 1977.

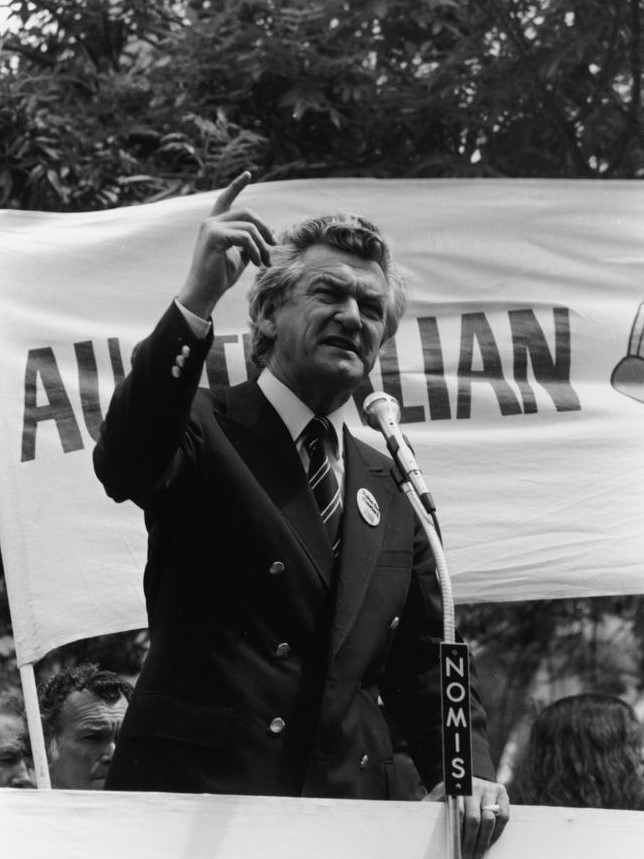
Under the Hawke-Keating government from 1983 to 1996, Australian wages and pensions rose, anti-discrimination laws were strengthened, and superannuation boards had to be elected, but sectoral collective bargaining was weakened.

Australian workers were among the world's wealthiest by the 1980s, but Parliament decided to follow US and UK models to reduce sectoral collective bargaining and awards, believing that it halted "productive innovation". In a 1983 Prices and Incomes Accord between Bob Hawke's Australian Labor Party and the Australian Council of Trade Unions, it was agreed that there should be minimum wage increases across whole sectors, and then further payments if productivity improved at enterprise level. This approach was codified in the Industrial Relations Act 1988, where industry-wide awards only provided a minimum safety net, enterprise bargaining would create certified agreements for higher wages, and unions and employers could take collective action including strikes, if certain conditions were fulfilled. The Industrial Relations Reform Act 1993 added provisions on unfair dismissal, and that non-union workplaces could also make collective agreements, if approved by a special majority, there was "no disadvantage" compared to awards, and workers were adequately informed about the bargain. These Acts relied on the Constitution's trade and commerce, corporations, and external relations powers, rather than the arbitration powers, since the High Court had indicated this was a valid basis for labour laws. Meanwhile, the Gough Whitlam government had passed the first Racial Discrimination Act 1975 that created a right of equal treatment based on race at work, the Sex Discrimination Act 1984 under Hawke prohibited discrimination on the grounds of sex, and together with the rights in the Disability Discrimination Act 1992, and the Age Discrimination Act 2004, complaints could be made to the Australian Human Rights Commission as well as courts for violation of anti-discrimination norms. Also under the Hawke-Keating government, the Superannuation Industry (Supervision) Act 1993 passed to ensure at least equal employee or beneficiary election rights on superannuation boards that provide workplace pensions.

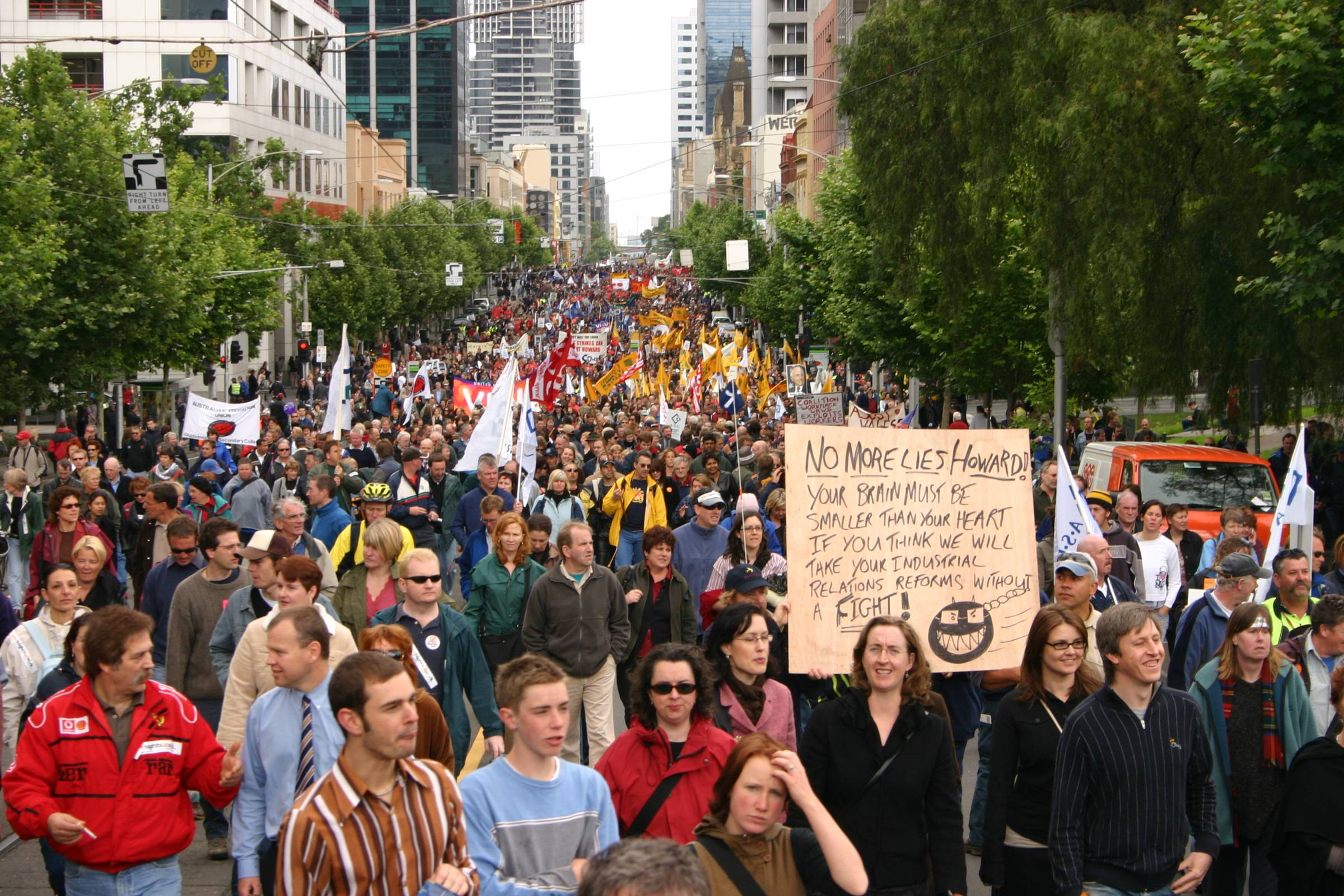
The Howard government's attacks on labour freedom and unfair dismissal protection led to mass protests against "WorkChoices" legislation.

When the Liberal coalition under John Howard regained office, its Workplace Relations Act 1996 reduced the allowable matters for awards to 20 issues, and enabled "Australian Workplace Agreements" to be made between individual employees and workers that could be worse than awards. It also created a freedom "not to associate" with a union and banned union preference clauses in awards. After Howard's government was re-elected in 2004, they passed the Workplace Relations Amendment (Work Choices) Act 2005. This abolished industry-wide awards, removed unfair dismissal protection from employees with under 100 staff in their workplaces, trade unions were no longer parties to collective agreements (only bargaining agents), a new set of "Australian Fair Pay and Condititons Standards" applied to all employers and employees, a new "Australian Fair Pay Commission" determined minimum wages, and this overrode all state rights even they were better. The deeply unpopular "Work Choices" led to the Howard government losing decisively in 2007, with John Howard himself losing his seat. The Fair Work Act 2009 replaced "Work Choices" with a restored system of unfair dismissal rights, individual "AWAs" were replaced with enterprise collective agreements, and minimum conditions of employment were renamed the "National Employment Standards" (NES). The Fair Work Commission oversees enforcement of awards and bargaining, sets industrial awards, minimum wages and resolves disputes including unfair dismissal. This basic structure was not touched by the Abbott, Turnbull and Morrison governments, although wages and standards continued to decline through lack of enforcement, growing casualization, and hostile judicial decisions. With the Albanese government, a series of reforms, such as the Fair Work Legislation Amendment (Closing Loopholes) Bill, aimed to raise protection, since Australian labour rights remained significantly below European and wealthier countries' standards. This includes the lack of a restored system for sectoral collective bargaining, weak protection for collective action, and absence of rights for workers to elect directors on boards of enterprises, outside isolated examples in universities or the Australian Broadcasting Corporation, 25 per cent of people on "casual" contracts, and stagnating real wages.

== Rights and contracts at work ==
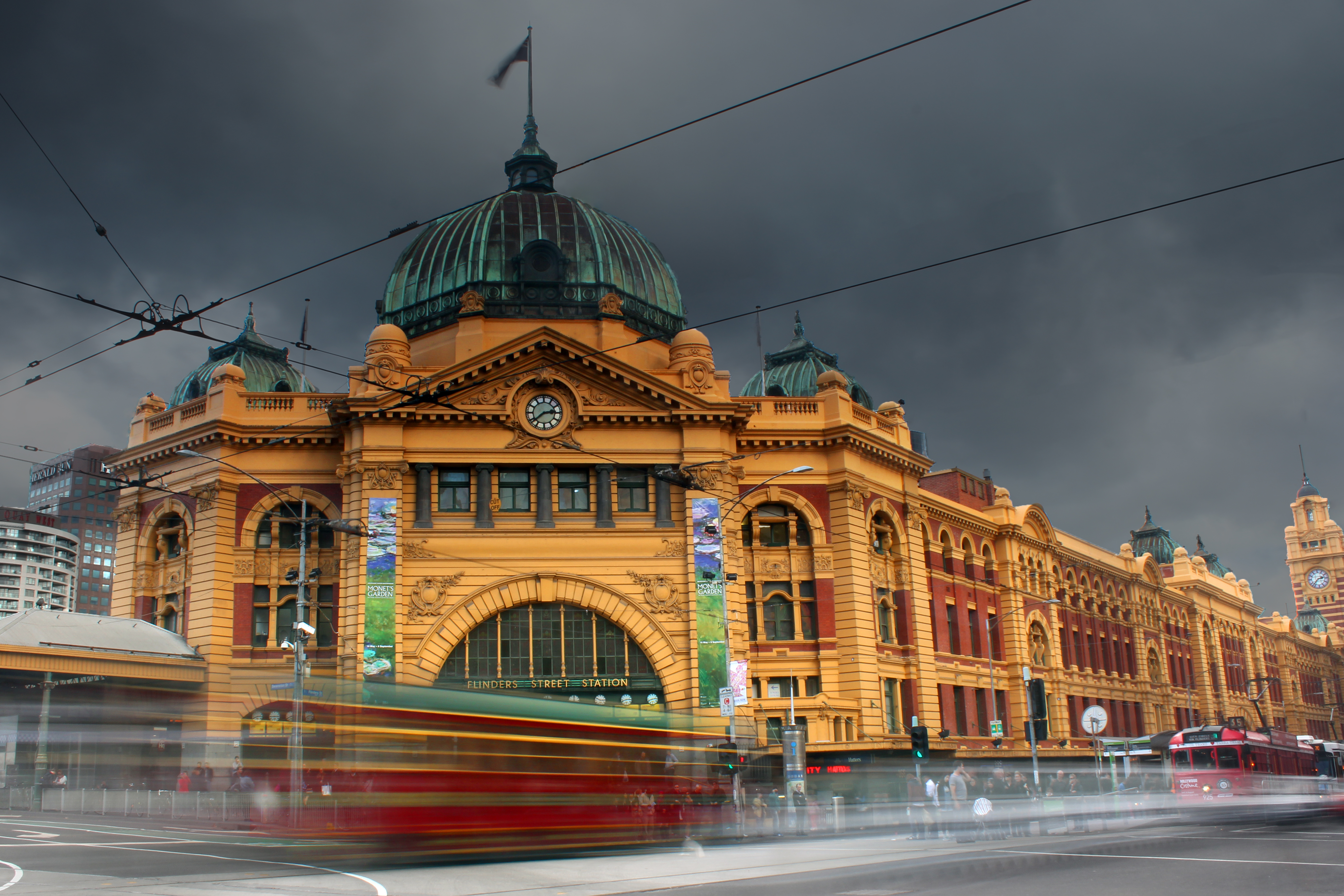
The Fair Work Act 2009 covers most Australian employees with rights such as fair pay scales, 38 hour weeks, overtime, at least 28 days holidays, paid parental leave, superannuation, and job security. Casual workers do not have many of these rights.

Australian work relationships begin with a contract, and carry basic rights for fair pay and conditions. Most rights are for "employees" (not the self-employed) who are defined by the reality of systematic unequal bargaining power compared to employers, usually organised in a corporate form. By law, rights are more important than contract terms that employers impose. A contract is a deal entered into by consent, and common law and statute set default rights, such as enough hours, a safe system of work, and sometimes good faith.

Under the Fair Work Act 2009, the Fair Work Commission sets a national minimum wage, a system of minimum pay scales in modern awards, and oversees collective bargaining between unions and employers. The National Employment Standards also set a floor of rights for a standard maximum 38 hour week, at least 28 to 37 days of annual leave and public holidays, and long service leave. Modern awards set by the Fair Work Commission, for 150 workplace sectors in 2024, must contain terms on working time, consultation before changes, disputes, and flexibility, and usually contain further rights such as higher overtime pay, rest breaks, more holidays, and superannuation to ensure people a decent retirement income.

There are also rights to paid parental leave, at a minimum of 20 weeks shared between parents, and the FWC has a duty to end the gender pay gap, given the prior failure to equalise and lengthen parental leave in awards and collective agreements. Unlike wealthy OECD countries, Australian law allows employers to designate employees as "casual", and take away universal rights such as paid holidays or job security in return for a nominal 25% extra pay even if they have lowered market pay in practice to nullify this "casual loading": in 2024, 22% of Australian employees were casual.

=== Scope of rights ===
In international law, "everyone" has the right to fair pay, to equal treatment, to join a union, to take collective action, and to social security including job security. However the scope of who has rights under the Fair Work Act 2009, including for award wages, paid holidays, collective bargaining, and job security, depends on the test for who is an employee, as opposed to an "independent contractor". Historically, this distinction was based on the view that employees have systematically unequal bargaining power, and therefore needed positive legal rights that would otherwise be lost in take-it-or-leave-it contracts that the employer imposed. The common law distinguished employees from the self-employed (who are responsible for their own rights, or fell back on the state), based on the employer's exercise of control, for instance over place or conditions of work. Courts asked whether workers were carrying "on a trade or business of his own", and viewed a contract's terms as obscuring reality, not revealing it. As a court said in 1988: "The parties cannot create something which has every feature of a rooster, but call it a duck and insist that everyone else recognise it as a duck". As well as control, courts looked at multiple factors including whether work was done personally, whether the worker works for others, the method of pay, ownership of equipment, trade marks, good will, and who got profits or bore losses. However, against this tradition, and international standards, the High Court in ZG Operations Australia Pty Ltd v Jamsek overturned the Federal Court to find that drivers who were made to buy their own vehicles were not employees, despite them bearing the employer's trade marks, working only for the company, and doing so for decades. The drivers were originally contracted as employees, but then their contracts were unilaterally altered in 1985–86 to deem them self-employed. Yet in the court's opinion, "the exercise of superior bargaining power... has no bearing on the meaning and effect of the bargains that were struck" and claims against resulting injustice "cannot be made by stealth under the obscurantist guise of a search for the "reality" of the situation". This opinion, meeting with widespread derision, was reversed by the Fair Work Act 2009 section 15AA(1) which states that an employee "is to be determined by ascertaining the real substance, practical reality and true nature of the relationship between the individual and the person" and (2) "regard must be had not only to the terms of the contract governing the relationship, but also to other factors relating to the totality of the relationship including, but not limited to, how the contract is performed in practice." By comparison, wealthier jurisdictions determine employee status and rights based on reality, bargaining power, and the purpose of the law, and disregard inconsistent contract terms.

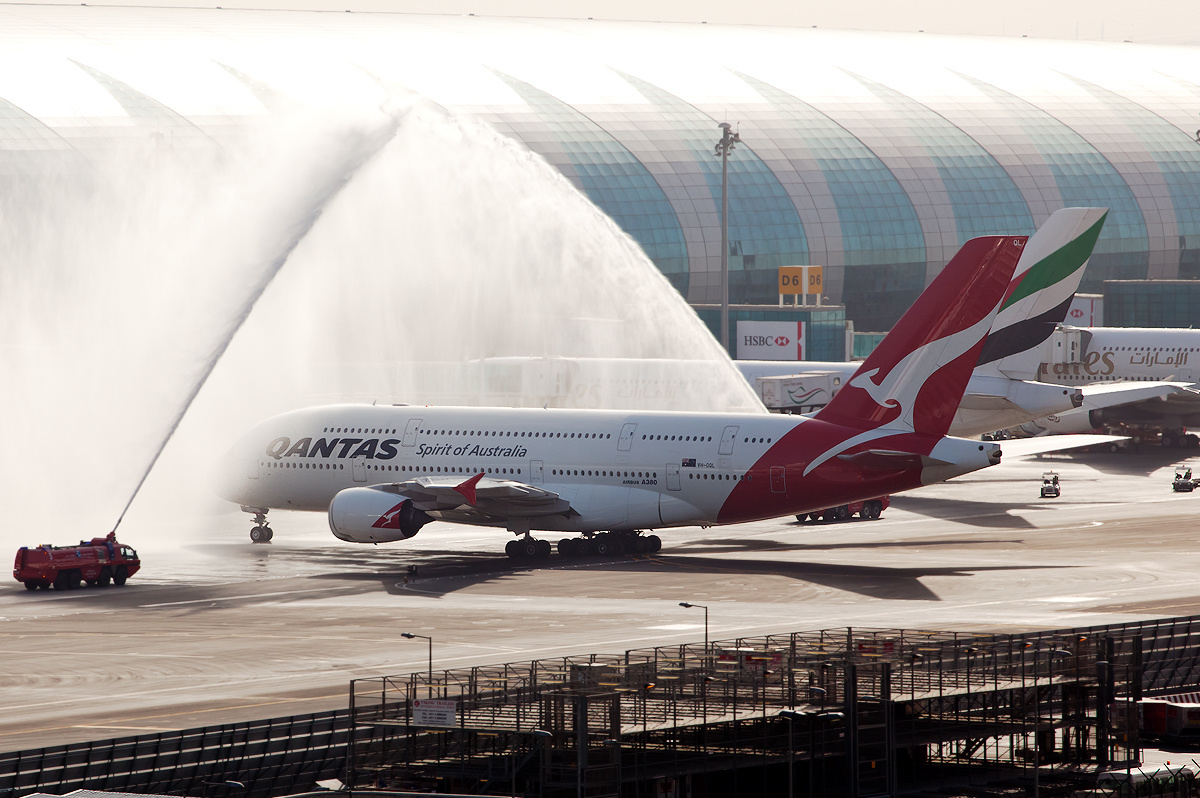
In FWO v Valuair Ltd (No 2) the Federal Court held that Qantas could use its subsidiary Jetstar to employ foreign workers in Australia on wages lower than Australian staff, undercutting the enterprise agreement.

The Fair Work Act 2009 section 357 codifies a civil remedy for misrepresentation that a contract is independent, rather than one of employment. However, compared to international standards, misclassification takes most through approval by the courts themselves. There are five main types of case. First, unpaid internships have been allowed, though in one case the limit was two weeks. Second, single person corporations can be easily established and engaged through a commercial (rather than employment) contract, although in ACE Insurance Ltd v Trifunovski the Federal Court held that insurance agents who were made to contract through corporations were still employees, even though they might hire clerical assistants.

Third, labour hire (or agency work) arrangements were held in Building Workers' Industrial Union of Australia v Odco Pty Ltd to enable people to be classified as self-employed in relation to the party they truly work for, so that even a 22 year old backpacker doing menial labour on building sites was classed as self-employed. Even where a labour hire agency is set up as an employer's wholly owned subsidiary to evade rights, courts have held this was lawful. Further, in FWO v Valuair Ltd (No 2) the Federal Court held that Qantas could use its wholly owned subsidiary Jetstar, incorporated in New Zealand, to employ foreign workers to work in Australia on wages lower than Australian staff, undercutting the enterprise agreement. In the court's view it was not enough that work was done in Australia, and it mattered that contracts were made in foreign countries with foreign corporations. Fourth, franchisors are subject to obligations under the Trade Practices (Fair Trading) Act 1998 to disclose information, allow franchisees to freely associate, not unfairly terminate contracts, and under the FWA 2009 sections 558A-C they are liable for breaching the Act if they should have been aware and taken preventative steps. The Modern Slavery Act 2018 also contains so called "due diligence" requirements for corporations to prevent forced labour in supply chains, but fails to impose vicarious liability, or personal liability, regardless of the mindset (or wilful ignorance) of directors. Finally, in Gupta v Uber Australia Pty Ltd the Fair Work Commission accepted that an Uber Eats driver was not an employee.

The new Fair Work Act 2009 section 15P reverses this by requiring that an "employee-like worker" has the same rights paying regard to "low bargaining power", low pay, and low degree of authority. Employee-like workers and road transport contractors may apply to the Fair Work Commission for a “Minimum Standard Order” or "Guideline", and make collective agreements with a digital labour platform. The orders and guidelines can include terms on payment, deductions, working time, record-keeping, insurance, consultation, representation, delegates’ rights, and cost recovery. Employee-like workers may also apply to the Fair Work Commission for unfair deactivations, unfair terminations, and unfair contracts.

=== Contracts of employment ===
The main gateway to work in Australian law is a contract based on consent. A contract begins whenever an employer and employee have agreed on work for a wage, although the Australian High Court distinguishes an "employment relationship", which only begins from the start date of work, unlike the contract that starts at the time of agreement. A contract's terms include anything a reasonable person would believe is included from an employer's words or conduc. So, in Saad v TWT the Federal Court held that a spoken promise to a TV media salesperson that they would be given a lucrative sales territory was a term, even though it was not included in the written service contract.

Even if a promise is not intended to be a term, representation that is misleading when made, and meant the employee foreited other opportunities, is actionable under the Competition and Consumer Act 2010 Sch 2. If an employee is told two things which conflict, the court's task is to construe the contract consistently, and tends to interpret terms against experienced commercial parties, which employers usually are, and to give preference to more specifically negotiated terms. Awards, enterprise bargains, and employer policy manuals will usually be incorporated into the contract. Under the Fair Work Act 2009 sections 124-125 employers must give each new employee a "Fair Work Information Statement" of their rights to national employment standards, awards, and their right to join a union. For instance, in Riverwood International Australia Pty Ltd v McCormick an employee claimed after working 36 years and being made redundant that the company policy manual's redundancy policy was incorporated. His contract said 'You agree to abide by all company policies... and any new ones', and the company redundancy policy said it 'shall apply' to redundancies at work, providing at least 3 weeks' pay for each year of service. The Court held by a majority that the agreement was an express term of the contract by incorporation, because the fact that the employee had to 'abide by' the policy meant the employer must as well.

However, in Commonwealth Bank of Australia v Barker the High Court accepted that when a manual said 'This Manual is not in any way incorporated as... any industrial award... nor does it form any part of an employee's contract' this was effective to prevent incorporation. In Byrne v Australian Airlines the High Court held that part of an award on a 'Termination, Change and Redundancy' procedure, which had been imposed on the employer, was not a term because it was a statutory instrument with its own sanctions for breach, and so it was not 'necessary' to incorporate or imply a contract term to match this.

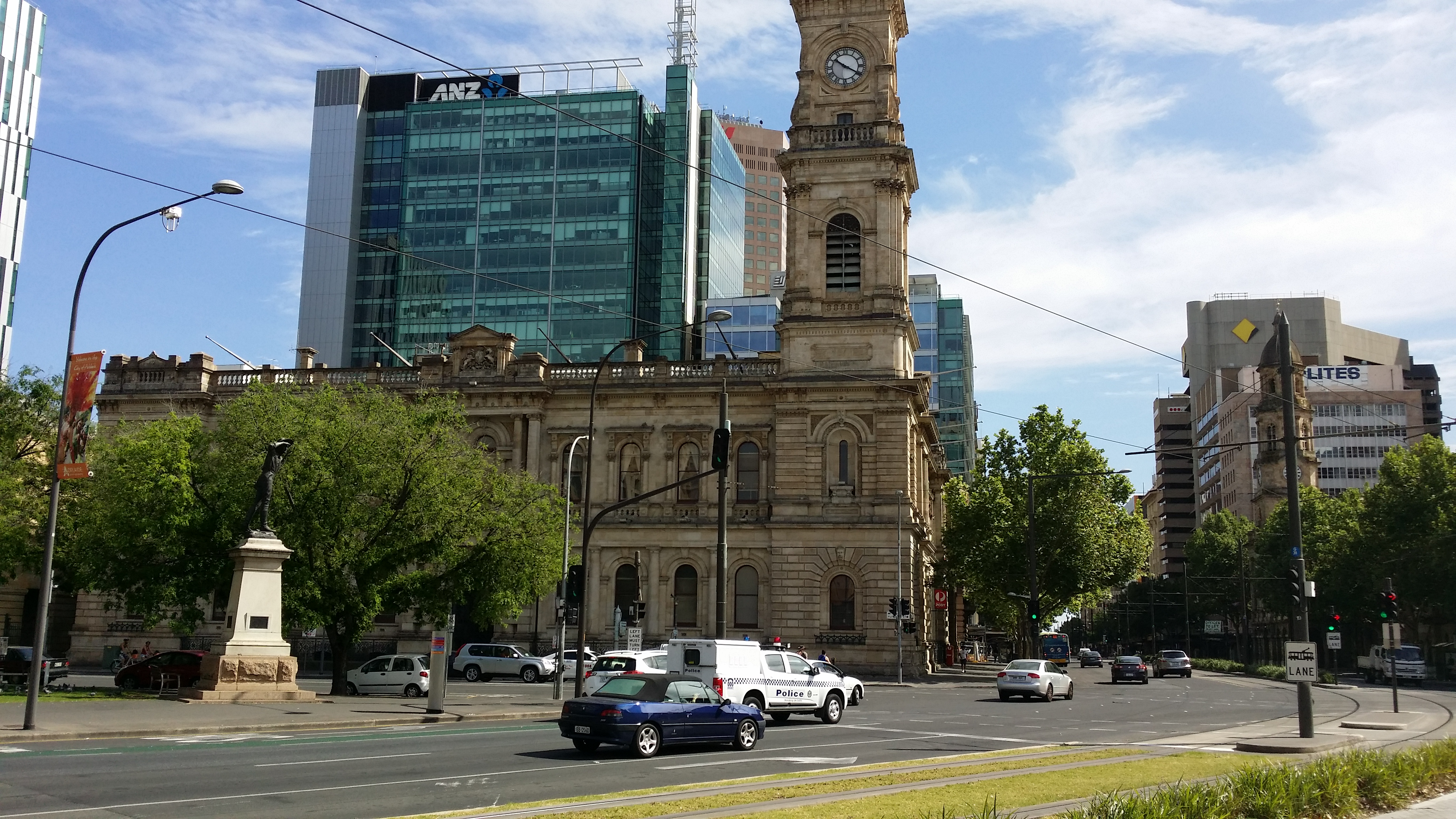
In Commonwealth Bank of Australia Ltd v Barker the High Court refused to acknowledge employers have a duty of good faith, unlike most of the world, taking the view that statutory rights are enough.

As well as express terms, and terms incorporated by notice, terms may be implied by courts. Terms are implied on the facts of a case when there is a gap if this is reasonable and equitable, necessary for business efficacy, so obvious it goes without saying, capable of clear expression, and consistent with the express terms. Terms are also implied by law where 'the enjoyment of the rights conferred by the contract would or could be rendered nugatory, worthless or perhaps be seriously undermined' without the term.

First there are a range of terms that benefit employers. The employee has a duty to obey orders that are lawful (e.g. not breaching the Fair Work Act 2009, or the Privacy Act 1988) and reasonable. For instance, in Anderson v Sullivan it was held that the state employer could require police officers to take a drug test even though it picked up use during private time. However in Australian Tramways Employees' Association v Brisbane Tramways Co Ltd Higgins J held that an employee had a 'common law right' to 'wear what he chooses, to act as he chooses, in matters not affecting work' including wearing a discreet union badge.

The employer may also be owed fiduciary duties that enable them to appropriate the benefits of work beyond the contract. So in Victoria University of Technology v Wilson it was held that when a professor developed profitable software it was not within the scope of his contractual duty, but as a senior leader he had a duty to avoid conflicts of interest with the university and should have asked the university's consent to pursue the opportunity for himself. This meant he had to give up all the profits from the invention. Indefinite employment contracts can be terminated upon reasonable notice (so long as this does not contradict express terms, other implied terms or statutory rights such as a fair process), and the employee must provide work to be paid.

Second, there are implied terms that benefit employees. Employers owe a common law duty of reasonable care to avoid putting employees at unnecessary risks of harm, because 'the employer is in a position to direct another to go into harm's way'. Where there are risks, an employer ensure it 'eliminates the risk' or provides 'adequate safeguards'. For instance in Patrick Stevedores v Vaughan an employer breached its duty by ordering a supervisor to cross a picket line to go to work, when it had instigated a violent dispute through its actions, and the supervisor suffered traumatic stress.

However in Koehler v Cerebos (Australia) Ltd the High Court refused a claim by a store merchandiser who was told to complete work in reduced hours, who suffered stress-related psychiatric illness, because it held that an employer can insist on performance of normal contractual duties, and overwork was not foreseeable. The Australian High Court is behind international standards by refusing to accept that employment is shaped by unequal bargaining power, or carries a duty of mutual trust and confidence, even a similar duty is accepted for commercial franchising and distribution agreements.

In Commonwealth Bank of Australia Ltd v Barker the High Court held there was no duty of mutual trust and confidence because employment is already heavily regulated by statute, which led to their conclusion that fair treatment in redundancy was not implied. By contrast, under the Independent Contractors Act 2006 section 12 explicitly states courts have the power to review and vary independent contractors' contracts if they are unfair, given their unequal bargaining power and lack of other statutory rights. Terms may also be implied by custom 'so well known and acquiesced in that everyone making a contract... can reasonably be presumed to have imported that term into the contract.'

=== Wages, awards and super ===
Collective bargaining through unions is one way that Australian workers achieve higher pay, but the Fair Work Act 2009 also creates a national minimum wage, and minimum scales depending on the workplace sector. FWA 2009 section 14 covers every "national system employer" that may be regulated by the federal constitution, and gaps were closed by all states referring their powers over industrial matters to the Commonwealth (except Western Australia). First, the Fair Work Commission sets a basic "national minimum wage" each year for all employees not covered by a specific "modern award", as a catch all safety net. From July 2023, the national minimum wage was $23.23 an hour, or $882.80 a week of 38 ordinary hours. Under section 284 its "minimum wage objective" must take into account improving productivity, competitiveness, inflation and employment growth, the need for gender equality, social inclusion through higher employment, the needs of the low paid, and fair wages for junior, training and disabled employees.

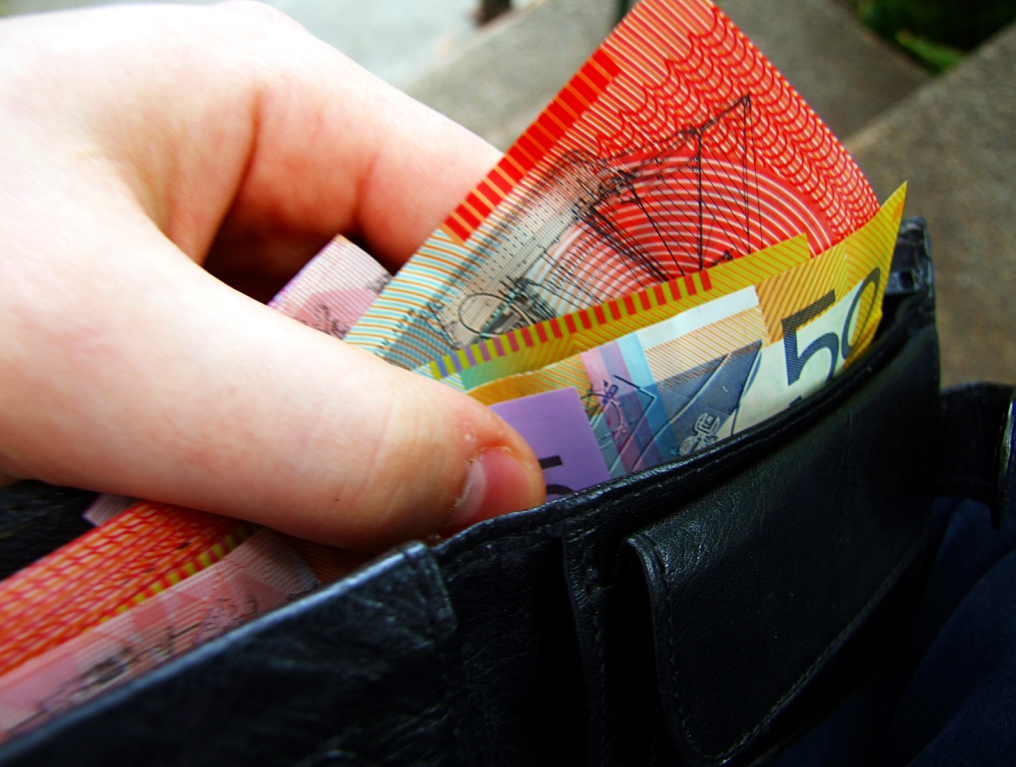
Wages in 2024 are overseen by the Fair Work Commission on three levels of (1) a national minimum ($23.23 an hour in 2024), (2) higher "awards" with pay scales based on experience for 150 different sectors, and (3) enterprise agreements between unions and employers in 15% of workplaces.

Second, "modern awards" are set by the Fair Work Commission. In 2024 there were 150 covering different workplace sectors. These have minimum pay scales depending on employees' experience, qualifications, and skills. For example, the "Legal Services Award 2020" sets minimum weekly rates for "levels 1 to 6" for clerical and administrative staff (but not lawyers), the "Reserve Bank of Australia Award 2016" sets "levels 1 to 5" for annual salaries, and the "Higher Education Industry – Academic Staff – Award 2020" sets a 24 level pay scale with both annual salaries for full-time employees, and comparable minimum hourly rates. These awards are usually far lower than under enterprise bargaining agreements, but are designed to place a minimum floor to prevent unfair competition. The objectives of the FWC under section 134 are improving secure work, gender equality, encouraging bargaining and a competitive economy. Under FWA 2009 section 158 an employer, employee, or trade union covered by the award can apply for a variation of an award. Often, "junior" employees under 21 years old are paid less, and are exempt in this respect from age discrimination laws, based on the theory that it may reduce youth unemployment, even though experience in New Zealand is that paying young people less does not encourage them to find work, and abolishing junior rates had no impact on youth employment. Most awards exclude managerial staff, and must exclude people based on the "seniority of their role" who were traditionally not covered, while "high income earners", paid over $167,500 in 2023, can agree to be exempt from an award if they have a guarantee of annual earnings.

This means that, unless enterprise bargaining covers them, fair pay scales do not constrain rip-off executive pay that diminishes the pay of everyone else. Third, there are enterprise agreements, which are bargained between unions and employers to be higher, and under section 57 will displace any sector-wide award. However, in 2012, enterprise agreement coverage reached a peak of merely 27%, and by 2021 coverage fell to 15%, compared to coverages typically over 80% in European Union member states that promote sectoral collective bargaining.

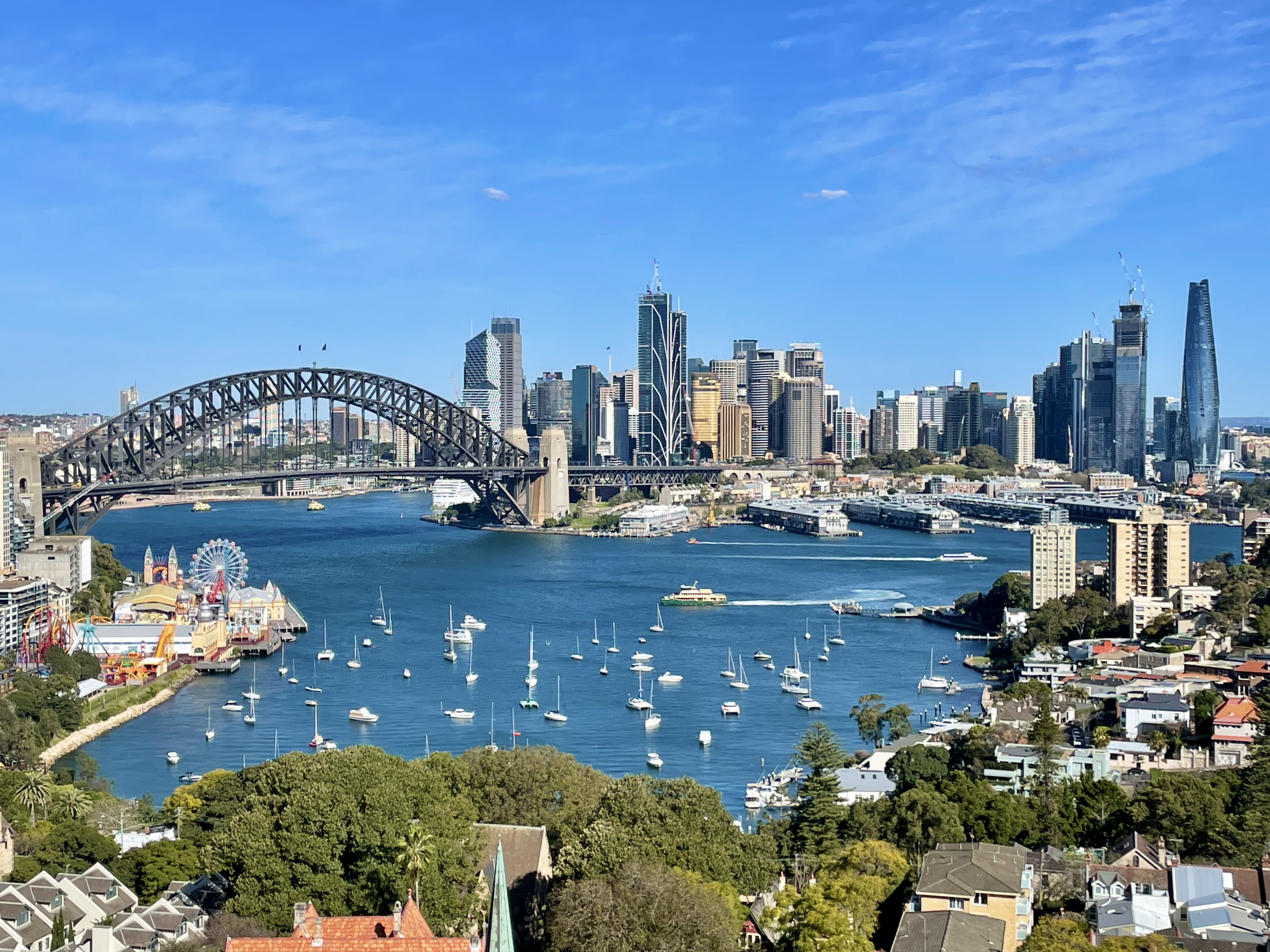
In 2020, Superfunds controlled $3.5 trillion in Australian retirement savings. Fund boards must have equal member and employer representation, but shareholder voting power may be outsourced to asset managers that vote against worker and union interests.

As well as basic pay, most awards set rates for working overtime, extra pay for work on Sundays or public holidays, and superannuation. For all breaches of modern awards, there are civil remedies. Under FWA 2009 section 323 requires that people are paid in money, rather than in kind (or "truck"). For example, in Australian Education Union v Victoria it was held to be unlawful for the state government to deduct each fortnight between $4 and $17 from salaries of teachers who had been given laptops. Superannuation in Australia provides people with workplace pensions in retirement, and employers must pay a "superannuation guarantee" of 12% of income from 2025 to approved funds. There may also be no unauthorised deductions of wages, and there is a right to be paid at least monthly. Under the Superannuation Industry (Supervision) Act 1993 section 89, the "basic representation rule" is that boards of funds have an equal number of member and employer-appointed trustees, but there may also be "independent" trustees or directors appointed by the incumbent board. By 2023, there were $3.5 trillion in assets under management at Australian superfunds, however the voting rights on corporation shares, which are usually held by super funds, are typically outsourced to asset managers who are not yet bound to any consistent voting policy that reflects the interests of the workforce.

=== Working time ===
Beyond fair pay, international labour law aims to reduce working time in line with rising productivity, for a fair work week with more holidays and time for education or retirement, unbound to an employer. Under the Fair Work Act 2009 section 61(2) there are eleven "National Employment Standards", and eight concern working time (while one is on casual work, and two are on job security). Like pay can go beyond the national minimum wage, modern awards set by the Fair Work Commission, and collective agreements between unions and employers, often do have higher standards. First, under section 62 the standard maximum working week for a full-time employee is 38 hours, and an employer may not request more "unless the additional hours are reasonable", taking account of health, family, workplace needs, any overtime payments, and notice. Under section 139 awards are permitted to, and often do include overtime pay, usually 1.5 times or 2 times the basic rate of pay. In calculating the 38 hour maximum, employees' working time over 26 weeks will be averaged out. Second most important is that employees have a right to at least four weeks' paid leave, or five weeks if the employee is a shiftworker. Third, under sections 114 to 116 there are additional paid public holidays, which vary by state but generally amount to between 8 and 12 extra days, depending on where weekends fall. However, an employer can make a "reasonable" request for employees to work on public holidays, and the employee may only refuse if reasonable, based on factors again including workplace needs, family, overtime rates, and notice. Fourth, there is a right to long service leave which vary by state and award, for instance 2 months paid leave after 10 years in New South Wales.

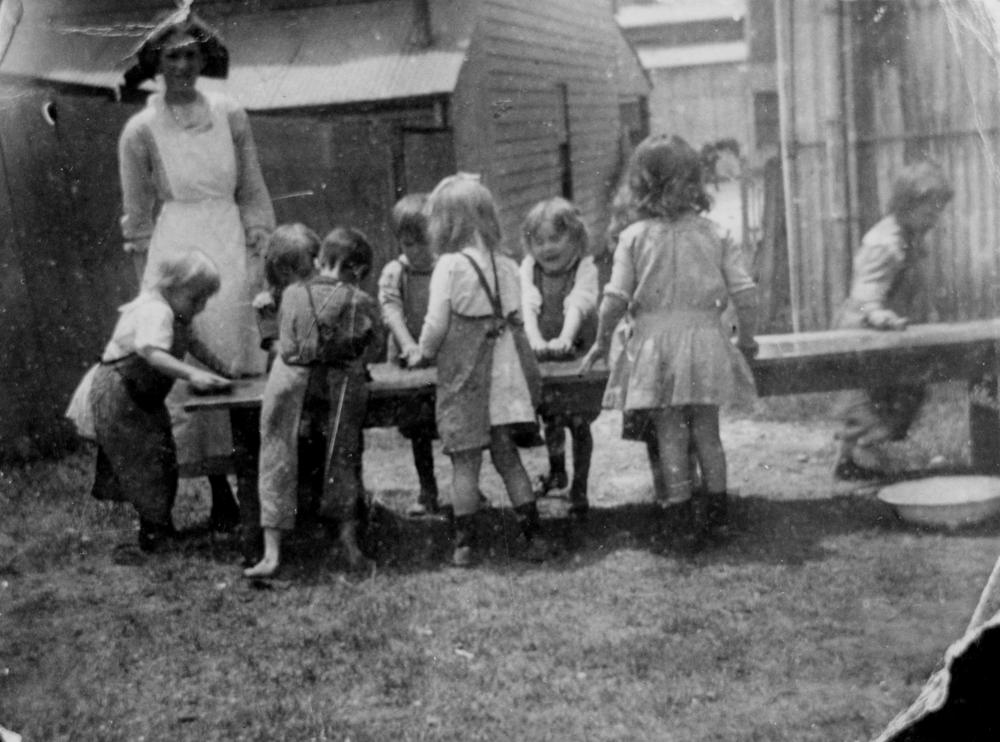
Women traditionally did more child care work than men, a primary cause of the gender pay gap. Since 2010, Australians have only 20 weeks in paid parental leave to share, which encourages women to take more leave than men, developing careers less, compared to countries with equal paid parental leave rights. The Fair Work Commission now has an express duty to reduce gender inequality.

Fifth, there is a disjointed right to paid parental leave under the Paid Parental Leave Act 2010, which entitles both parents to share 20 weeks paid leave (but at least 2 weeks reserved for one). Also under the FWA 2009 section 76 there is a further right to one year, but of unpaid leave, extendable to two years if an employer accepts the request. There are rights to a safe job during pregnancy or paid leave if no job is available, to return to the same position as before or if it does not exist to one "qualified and suited nearest in status", and to be consulted about any proposed changes to the job while on leave.

In practice, these rules encourage women to take more time off work for child care than men, and so contribute to the gender pay gap as well as the motherhood penalty, compared to countries that have equal paid parental leave for parents on a use-it-or-lose-it basis. When using its powers to set awards, the Fair Work Commission is now required by section 134(1)(ab) to take into account "the need to achieve gender equality in the workplace". Sixth, there is the right to care or compassionate leave. Seventh, there is a right to community service and jury leave of up to 10 days. Eighth, there is a right to request flexible work for carers and parents with school age children, and only be refused if there are reasonable business grounds.

=== Casual and atypical workers ===
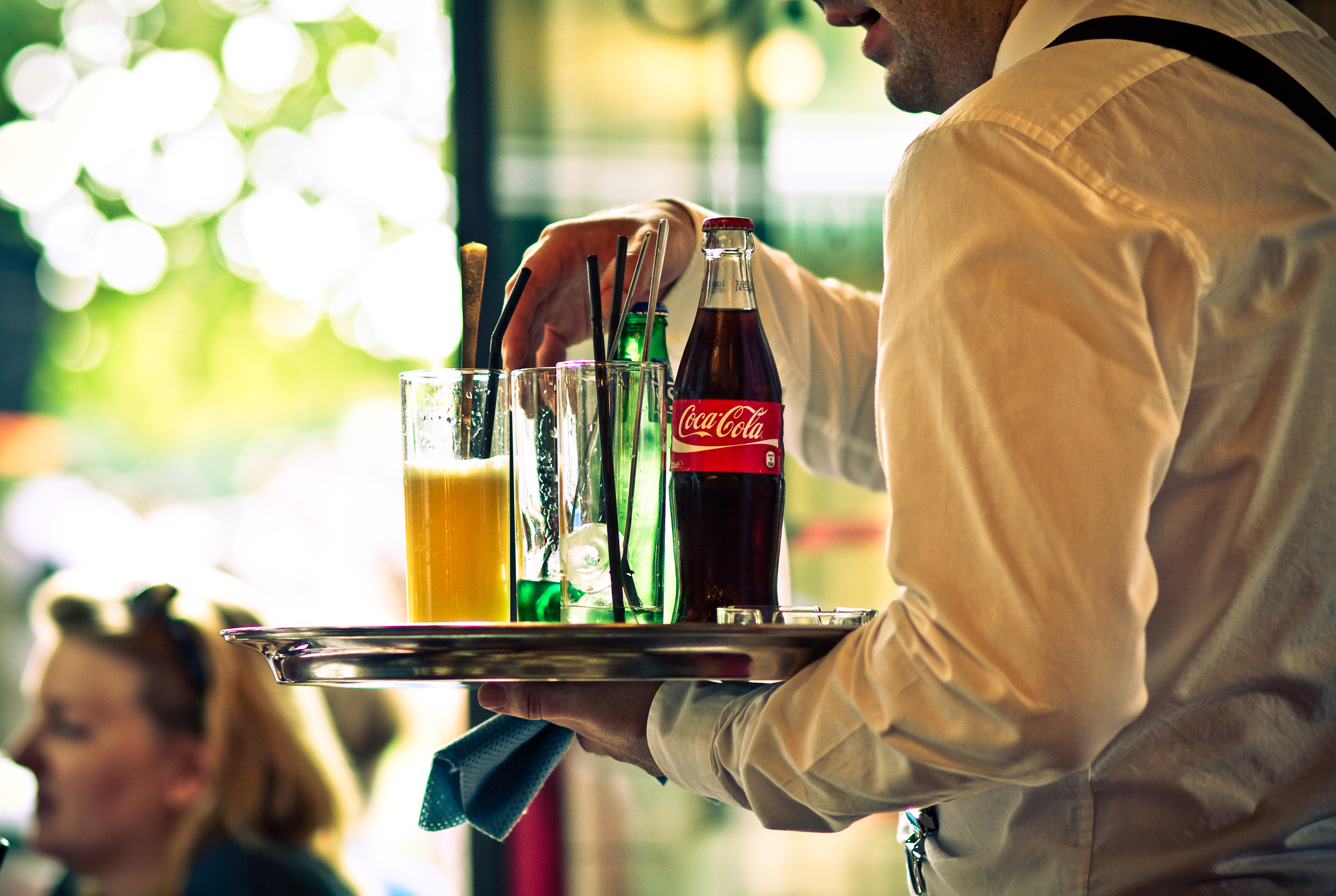
Australian law lets employers class employees as "casual", and not give them paid holidays, parental leave, and job security. This currently affects 22% of the workforce.

Unlike most wealthy OECD countries, Australian law enables employers to not provide all rights of employment, particularly paid holidays and job security, if people are classed as "casual" employees, and in 2023 this meant around 22% of employees. To compensate for the absence of rights, modern awards typically grant a 25% "casual loading" additional pay, but potentially no holidays at all, putting Australia at odds with European Union practice

There is also no legal mechanism to prevent employers rates of pay before the 25% loading is added. Under the Fair Work Act 2009 section 15A a casual employee exists if the relationship has an "absence of a firm advance commitment to continuing and indefinite work", replacing the previous notion that an employee simply accepts they do in a contract. This reversed the decision of the High Court in Workpac Pty Ltd v Rossato, that where a contract states someone is casual, even if the employer is providing them with ongoing work in regular and systematic shifts in reality, they are still casual employees and not entitled to paid holidays under FWA 2009 section 86.

Casual workers are protected by unfair dismissal after 6 months, or 12 months for a small business, if they are deemed to work 'on a regular and systematic basis' and have a reasonable expectation of continued employment, but otherwise risk losing job security rights. Since 2021 casual workers must get an offer of a permanent contract offer after 12 months unless there are reasonable grounds to not make the offer.

Other types of atypical work contract include part-time, fixed-term and labour hire staff. First, since the Workplace Relations Act 1996 section 526, awards have been able to provide equal treatment for part-time workers. Part-time employees are often also casual employees and not treated equally regarding holidays and job security, and this has a negative disproportionate impact on women. Second, fixed-term staff are treated unequally compared to permanent staff in that the simple expiry of a fixed term counts as an unchallengeable reason for dismissal, no matter how capriciously or maliciously motivated the reasons are for non-renewal. Third, under the FWA 2009 sections 306C-G there is a limited right to equal treatment for employees contracted through a labour hire firm compared to directly hired employees, after application to the Fair Work Commission. Unlike wealthier OECD countries the right is not automatic, and unavailable for workers of small businesses.

== Union rights and bargaining ==
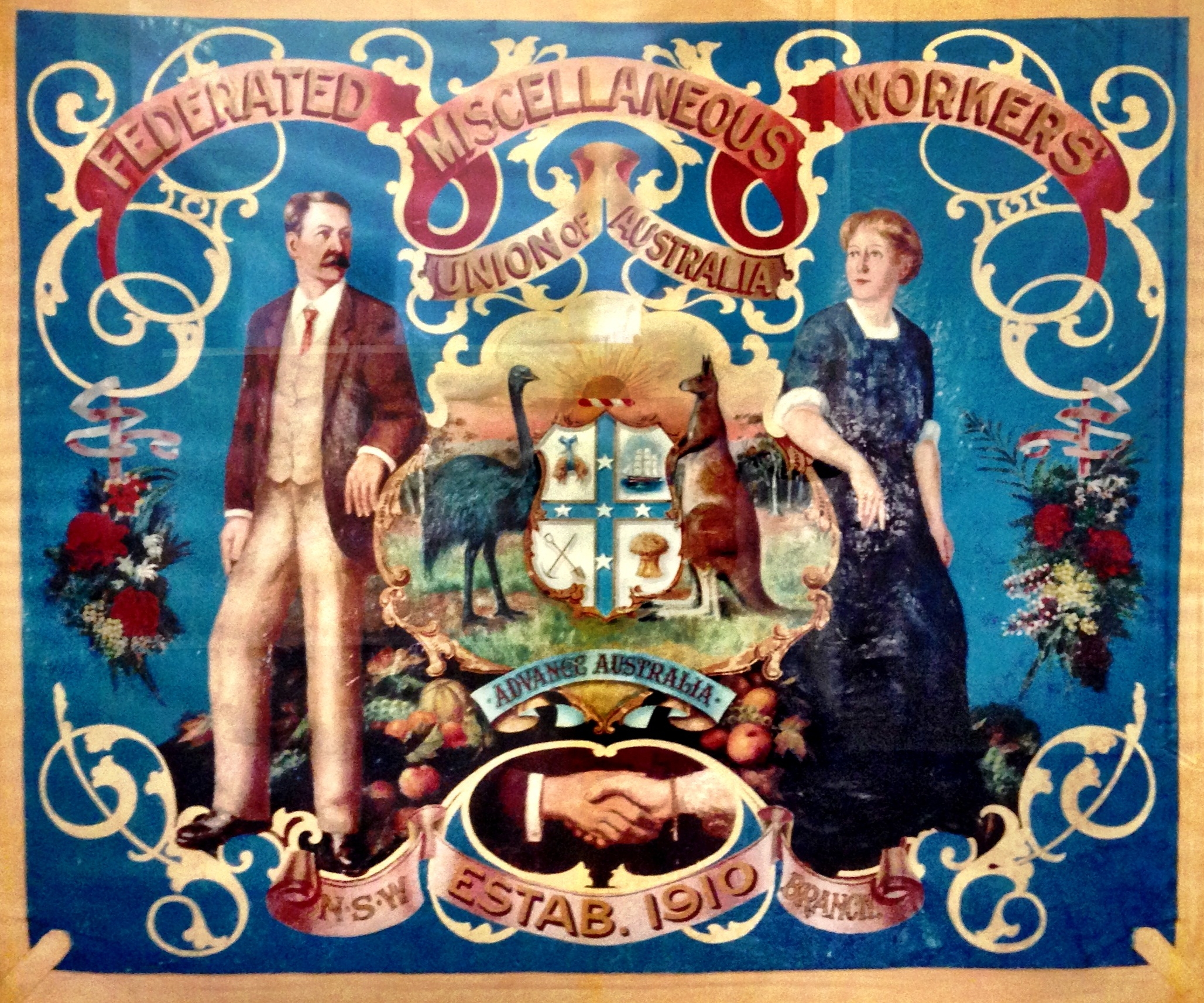
Over the 20th century, the Australian labour movement, with collective bargaining, arbitration and action, created the weekend, the 8 hour day, and systems for fair pay.

The right to join a union, freely associate and take action including strikes, are universal rights in international law, enshrined after the experience of mass war and dictatorship. Australian law provides minimal protection, and has been consistently criticised by the International Labour Organization. There is a basic right to join a union, yet the High Court has made protection for discrimination against union members weak by enabling employers to argue they did not intend to target union members with adverse action. There is a right to collective bargaining, but only within "single-employer" enterprises, creating major legal obstacles to sectoral collective bargaining found in other prosperous countries. Key to this is the prohibition on the right to take solidarity action, i.e. workers of one employer striking with workers of another employer to get a multi-employer deal, especially to prevent anti-productive competition. There is a limited right to take collective action, to get a collective agreement with a single employer. Australia has a significant history of workers voting for representation on boards of directors of the corporations or other governing bodies where they work, particularly in New South Wales, and in federal public services such as the ABC and Australia Post. However Australia has not yet passed a general federal law, like a majority of wealthier OECD countries, to protect the right to vote for directors at work.

=== Trade unions and free association ===
In 2024 there were 1.4 million trade union members in Australia, 46 of which are affiliated with the Australian Council of Trade Unions. Each union has a different constitution, and system for electing its Secretary and President, but most unions follow a pattern of members electing delegates, who in turn elect the union executive, in contrast with a direct election model. Union membership among the workforce in 2024 was around 15%, having declined from a peak close to 60% in 1962, even though surveys routinely suggest that many more Australian workers would prefer to be covered by a union.

The fall in membership followed the shift to enterprise bargaining, and the ban on the closed shop since 1996. The Fair Work Act 2009 section 346(a) says there is a right to suffer no "adverse action" from an employer (or anyone) if that person "is or is not, or was or was not, an officer or member of an industrial association". Clauses in awards and collective agreements to give preferences to union members over non-members are also prohibited.

In Patrick Stevedores v MUA the Federal Court awarded an injunction against the company for discriminating against union workers during the bitter 1998 Australian waterfront dispute.

The positive side of freedom of association is that the law protects everyone against adverse action for joining a union, and also taking part in collective action including strikes that count as "protected industrial action". If an employee alleges that the employer has taken adverse action for a prohibited reason, "it is presumed that the action was, or is being, taken for that reason or with that intent, unless the [employer] proves otherwise." The claimant may apply to the Fair Work Commission which holds a conference, compulsory in cases of dismissal, and the FWC may arbitrate with the parties' consent. Despite the intent of Parliament, in Board of Bendigo Regional Institute of Technical and Further Education v Barclay the High Court held that the reverse burden of proof made it legitimate to focus on the subjective reasons of the decision-maker, so that direct "testimony from the decision-maker which is accepted as reliable is capable of discharging the burden", and that this achieved a "balance". The High Court repeated this stance in CFMEU v BHP Coal Pty Ltd, where a striking worker held a sign saying "No principles SCABS No Guts", and was dismissed for violating BHP's "workplace conduct policy". The High Court sided with the employer's assertion that dismissal was for uncivil language, not union activity, and said that a claimant would only be protected from an employer's deliberate and conscious victimisation, not employers who make out they (supposedly) inadvertently took adverse action. This approach falls below international standards, where adverse action is a purely objective test. By contrast in CFMEU v Clermont Coal Pty Ltd an employer was found liable for selecting a union organiser named Mr Scott for redundancy, ostensibly on the basis of "attitude", but where all supervisor's assessments of "attitude" came from Scott's role in union organising, and Scott had an objectively better work record than others scored higher.

=== Collective bargaining ===
To get fair wages beyond the national minimum wage, and award wage scales, unions and employers may collectively bargain. Unlike most wealthy OECD countries, Australia's collective bargaining system is largely confined to individual enterprises, rather than multi-employer bargaining. Combined with weak protections for union organising, this means that coverage of collective agreements was just 15% in 2022, compared to coverages typically over 80% in wealthier European Union member states that promote sectoral collective bargaining. Under the Fair Work Act 2009 sections 247–252, the Fair Work Commission may authorise "single interest employers" to bargain, which can include a corporate group, or multiple entities in a joint venture or common enterprise, but usually separate organisations bargain separately, if at all. Under section 186, the FWC may approve multi-employer agreements, but must find that the "agreement has been genuinely agreed to by each employer" with "no person coerced", even though solidarity strike action is unlawful in Australia. This makes multi-employer agreements rare and the coverage for fair wage agreements historically low. Employees of several employers may also ask the FWC for a special "low-paid bargaining" authorisation under sections 241 to 246, if worker pay is particularly bad and bargaining power weak, but even then employees do not have a right to take collective action. Under sections 260–265, the FWC may make a low pay determination if bargaining does not work, but in practice no multi-employer agreements have resulted. Despite this lack of coverage, the law allows so called "greenfield agreements", where employers make an agreement in new workplaces to last up to 4 years (or 8 years for construction projects) without any strike action possible. For instance, in Shop, Distributive & Allied Employees Association v ALDI Foods Pty Ltd, the supermarket chain Aldi made an agreement with 17 prospective employees, ignoring the union, and the High Court said that under section 172 an agreement could be made even though the employees had not begun work. The FWC can make "scope orders" under section 238 on whether employee groups are fairly chosen, given geographical, operational or organisational distinction.

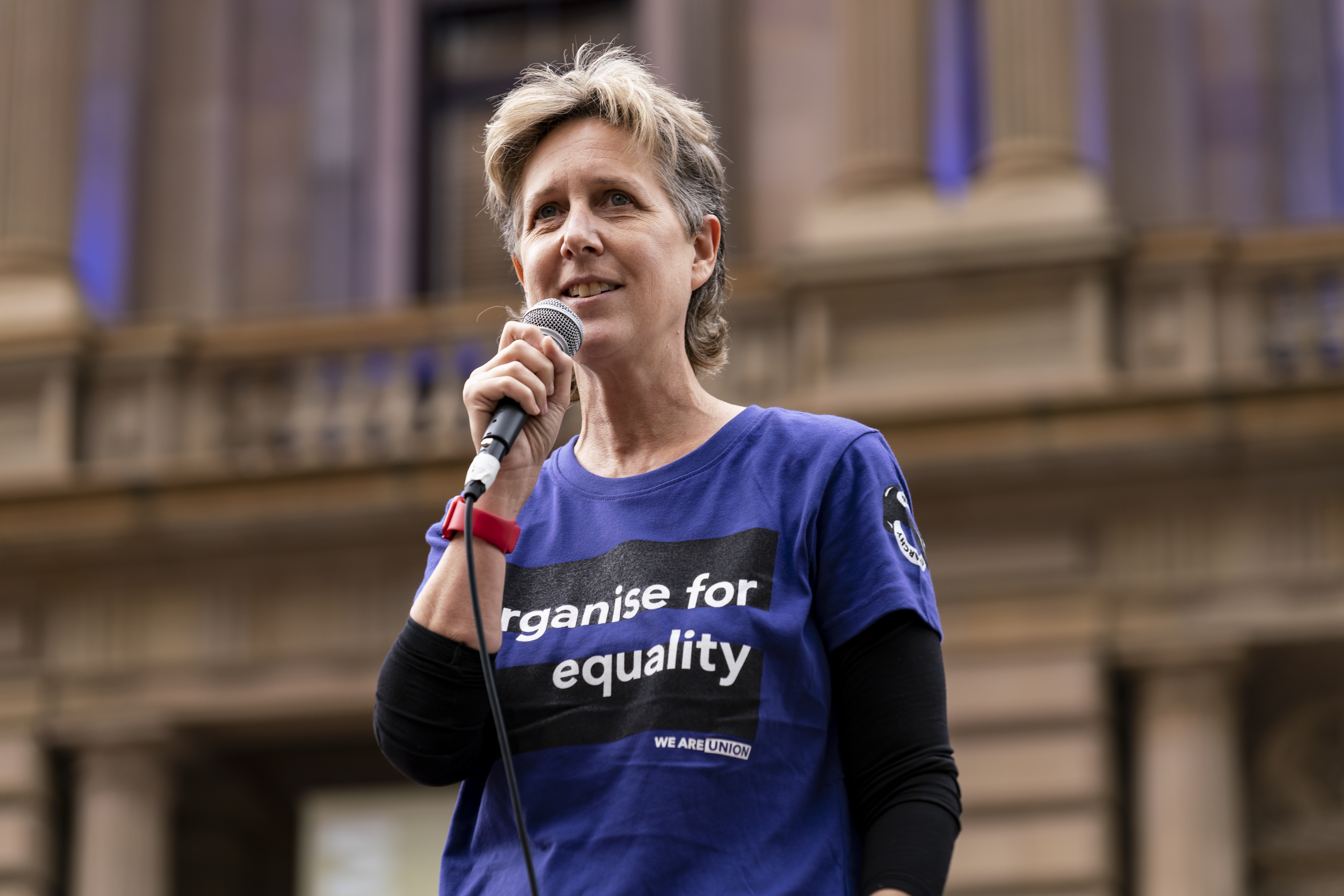
The General Secretary of the ACTU, Sally McManus, negotiated the JobKeeper wage subsidy scheme with the Morrison government during the COVID-19 pandemic.

Employers can always voluntarily agree to collectively bargain, but if they do not, under section 237 the Fair Work Commission can require good faith bargaining after determining that there is majority support, "using any method the FWC considers appropriate", such as petitions, pledge cards, union lists, or in rare cases a ballot. Under section 228(1), the "good faith" requirements are that the FWC can make the employer and union meet at reasonable times, disclose relevant information, respond to proposals, genuinely consider them, refrain from capricious and unfair conduct, and recognise the other side's bargaining representatives.

The employer is not required to make concessions or reach agreement on terms, but it was held in Endeavour Coal v Association of Professional Engineers, Scientists and Managers that the employer "must genuinely participate in the bargaining process; it cannot adopt the role of a distinterested suitor, only rejecting offers and proposals made by the other bargaining representatives." Here the employer refused to cooperate despite majority employee support for the union, and the FWC granted the APESMA an order (1) requiring a list of matters the employer was prepared to include in a bargain, and terms it would accept, (2) to cease unilaterally determining a standard form contract for staff, (3) to ensure someone with decision-making capacity attended meetings, (4) to meet within 21 days. The federal court partially upheld the award, saying that the FWC had not erred in finding a breach of good faith. Single workplaces may have multiple unions, and in such cases an employer may apply to the FWC for an order that bargaining representatives meet to elect one to represent all of them if "the bargaining process is not proceeding efficiently or fairly because there are multiple bargaining representatives for the agreement."

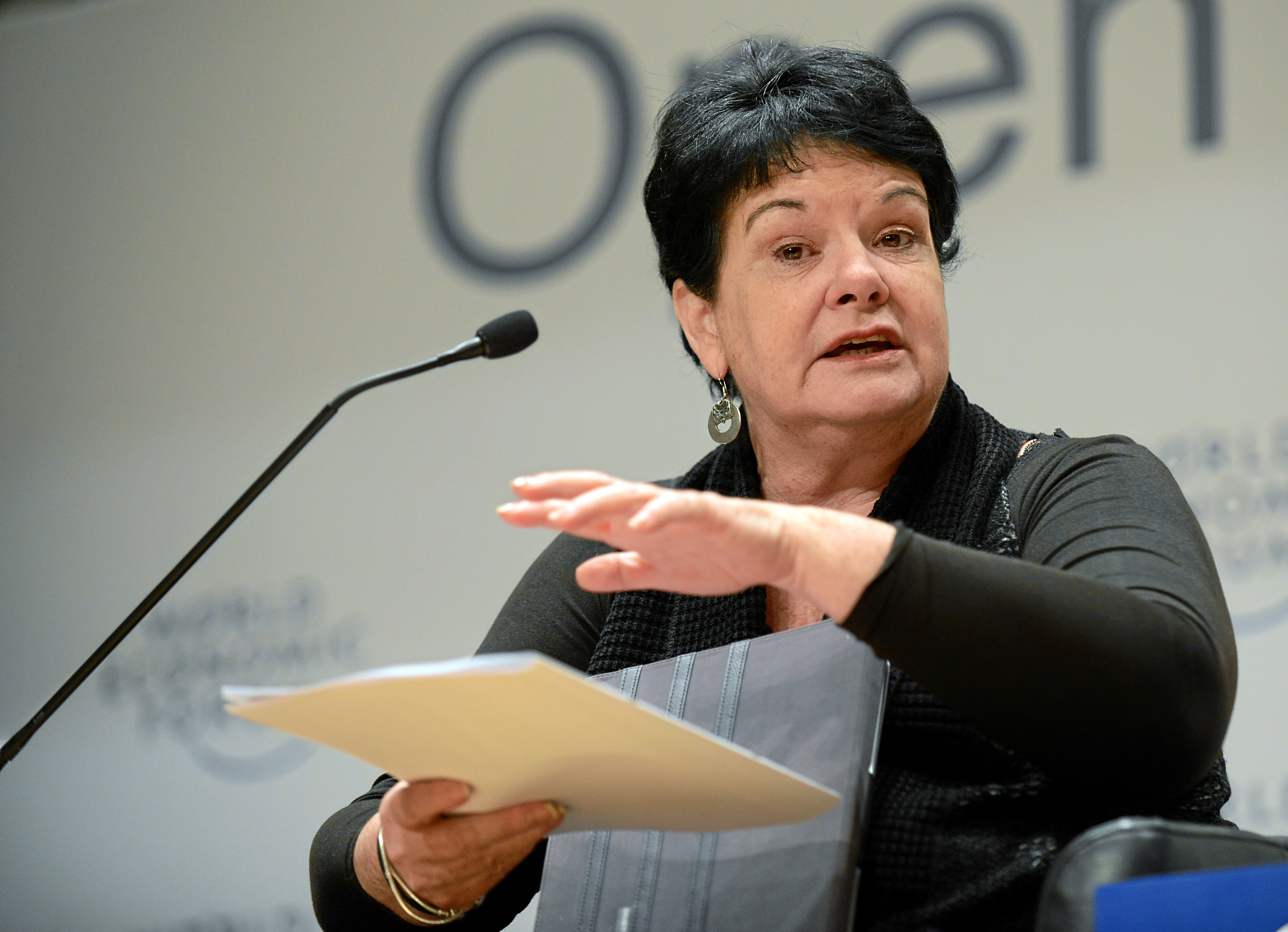
Sharan Burrow was the General Secretary of the Australian Council of Trade Unions, and then the International Trade Union Confederation.

The content of a collective agreement must include terms for an expiry date no longer than 4 years (even if the parties want an ongoing agreement), a dispute resolution clause, a term for employees to make "individual flexibility agreements" (so long as employees are "better off overall"), and a term on consultation on any "major workplace changes" that could impact employees or change hours of work. To assist, the Fair Work Regulations 2009 Schedule 2.3 prescribes a model consultation term. Under section 172, other negotiated content can be anything "pertaining to the relationship between an employer" and "employees", or unions, payroll deductions from wages for union membership dues, and how the agreement will operate.

Several court decisions have unduly limited what counts as pertaining to the employment relationship, including not regulating trading hours as opposed to working time, how to deal with surpluses in a defined benefit superannuation fund, whether money was transferred to a union-controlled super-fund, and constraints on employing contract labour as opposed to equal treatment. Even more, the law restricts agreements on union rights of entry, varying restrictions on strike action, and terms requiring employers pay bargaining service fees for non-union members. Once made, an agreement covers all employees it is expressed to, and the agreement is legally binding with civil remedies for breach, with the right of the employer, any employee, and the union having standing to sue in federal court.

- Arbitration by consent, s 240. Workplace determinations, s 275
- 50% vote to approve by staff after final offer of employer, s 182
- Process to approve an agreement, ss 180–186
- Agreements approved by FWC, not below NES and pass BOOT, s 55
- BOOT, each employee must be better off than in an awards 193
- Variation by same process as making: ss 207–224
- FWC can approve termination if in public interest, s 225 - back to award unless terms incorporated - or if out of date, it limits productivity, etc.

=== Collective action ===
The right to take collective action, including the "right to strike" within "the laws of the particular country" is a universal right in international law. However, Australian law is one of the most restrictive on unions' freedom to take action to protect members' interests, and progressive restrictions on voice at work have matched a stagnation of wages. Before 1993, the law formally did not allow strike action at all, although in practice many strikes took place. Disputes were meant to be solved by compulsory arbitration, leading to notable instances of union officers being sued in tort for millions in damages where they took action. This is because under old common law, a strike that breaks a contract may lead to the imposition of industrial torts. Under the Fair Work Act 2009 section 19, industrial action is performing work "in a manner different from that in which it is customarily performed" or "a restriction or limitation on, or a delay in, the performance of work". It is not clear whether picketing is always industrial action, given a Federal Court case before the FWA 2009 doubting that it was, leading to the result that picketing would not be protected action, but also that the FWC could not issue stop orders against pickets.

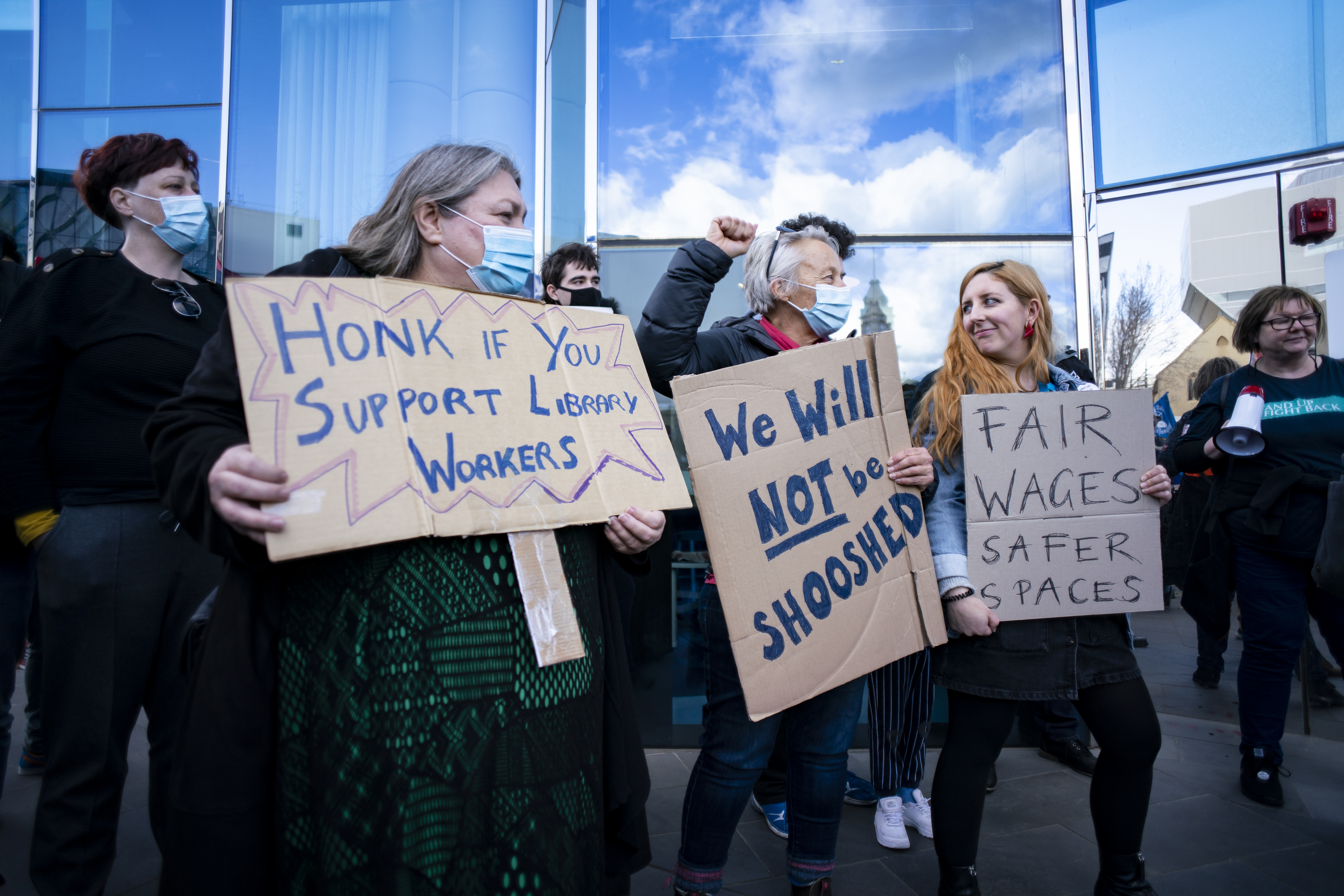
Picketing, like the Geelong library staff in 2021, is part of the universal right to peaceful protest in a free society. Its status in Australian law is uncertain, although it will not attract liability for secondary action.

To begin industrial action for an "employee claim" it must be against a single-business enterprise, rather than multiple employers, it cannot even be part of so-called "pattern bargaining" seeking the same agreements across different enterprises, and it must not be taken before an enterprise agreement has expired. The union must get permission from the FWC to do a protected action ballot, and the FWC must grant an order where the union has a majority support determination and is "genuinely trying to reach an agreement" by negotiation. The ballot must state what kinds of action are proposed, and be overseen by the Australian Electoral Commission or an independent agent, and over 50% must turn out to vote, with over 50% being in favour of action.

A union then must then give notice of three days to the employer, and start action within 30 days, or get an extension for another 30 days from the FWC, though action may continue indefinitely until there is agreement or the bargaining period is terminated. Protected industrial action is immune from liability in tort, so long as there is no personal injury, property damage or defamation. However, if industrial action is taken that is unprotected, the FWC must issue a "stop order", which may be backed by an injunction of the Federal Court, and ultimately sanctions for contempt of court including prison.

There is a four-hour pay penalty for unprotected action, and by law workers may not be paid during industrial action. Where duties are partially performed, at common law there is an obligation to pay for work accepted, unless the employer makes clear they will not accept partial performance, a position which encourages all out strikes and exacerbates disputes. Moreover, employers who cannot reasonably operate broken machinery, or is facing a closure from strikes, can stand down employees without pay. Even where industrial action is protected and valid, the FWC still has jurisdiction to suspend or terminate action if it threatens significant economic harm on application of a union or a federal or state Minister, if it threatens life, safety, health, welfare or part of the Australian economy, if a cooling off period would "assist in resolving the matters at issue", or if there is significant harm to a third party. For instance, in the 2011 Qantas industrial disputes, the Minister intervened to get a stop order to suspend a pilot strike at Qantas, given the impact on the national tourism industry.

Secondary boycotts have been banned since 1977, so that unions cannot take action in solidarity with workers in different workplaces, even where anti-productive competition is driving pay down in a race to the bottom across a whole sector. The ban is enforceable by the Australian Competition and Consumer Commission regardless of whether the parties to a dispute pursue a complaint. It is not yet clear that self-employed workers have the right to take collective action, although under international law, the right to act and strike is guaranteed for "everyone".

=== Worker directors ===
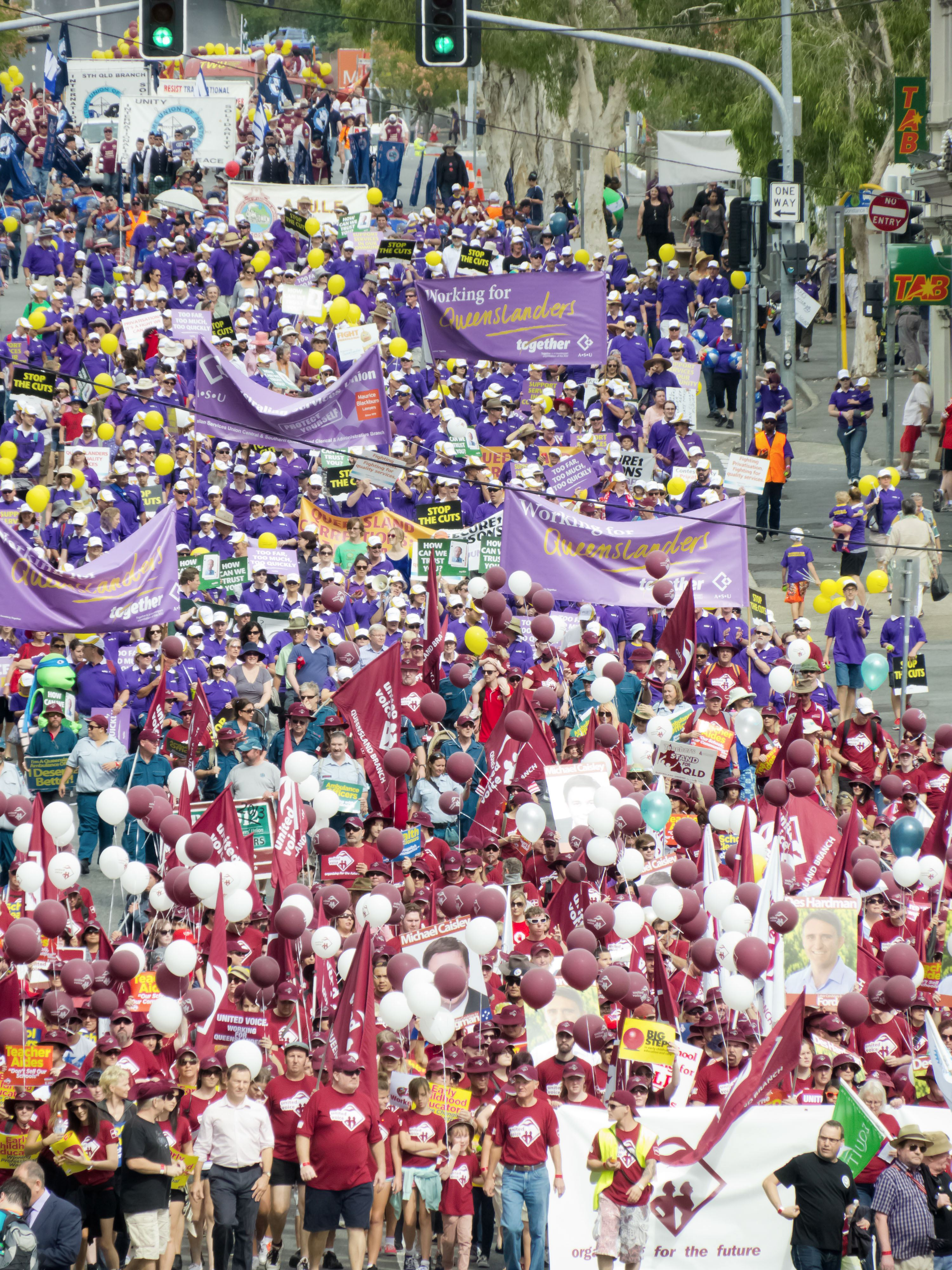
A Labour Day march in Brisbane, 2014

Although a majority of OECD countries protect the right of employees to vote for directors on boards of corporations (usually at least one-third), Australia has not yet passed a general law by amending the Corporations Act 2001, the Fair Work Act 2009 or state laws for worker directors. However, Australia does have board-level employee representation (or "codetermination") in occupational pensions, and several specific sectors. First, under the Hawke-Keating government Australia enacted a leading model for voice in worker's capital, now in the Superannuation Industry (Supervision) Act 1993 section 89, requiring an "equal numbers of employer representatives and member representatives" on the board of directors or trustees in a super-fund.

In 2010, a proposal was made to amend this for so called "independent directors" to be required to take the balance of power, appointed by the incumbent board, even though the evidence suggested this would be a step backwards. No changes were passed. There is not yet express legislation to require that asset managers, to whom investment and shareholder voting was outsourced, must follow the voting policies set by elected representatives on superannuation fund boards, as is found in Switzerland.

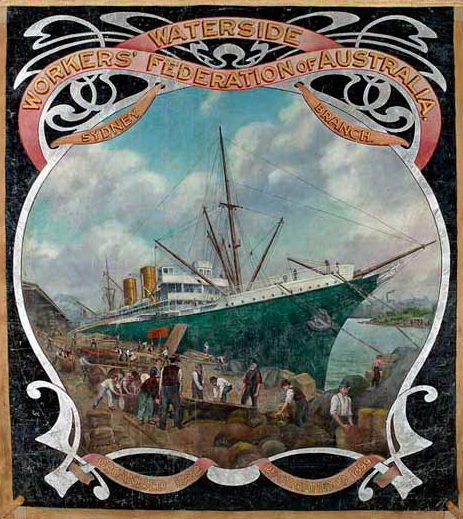
A 1920s Water Workers of Australia banner

Second, Australian public enterprises, state laws, and private corporations have frequently created worker directors, and voting rights for employees. In 1952 a trade union representative was included on the board of the new Electricity Commission of New South Wales. Other state electricity authorities did the same. The NSW State Dockyard and the railways included worker directors. There was also a worker director on the board of the South Australian Meat Corporation from 1972. In 1984 there were 19 different state corporations with worker directors.

Under the Public Service Reform Act 1984, section 12 required that each government department "in consultation with relevant staff organizations... cause to be developed an industrial democracy plan for the Department". By 1995, 13% of all workplaces surveyed had employee representatives on boards, most common in education, health, and communications. Federally there were worker directors at statutory corporations including the ABC, Qantas, Telstra, Australia Post and the Reserve Bank during the ALP Government from 1983 to 1996. There were also requirements for employee-elected directors at major universities, such as the University of Melbourne, but not yet requirements for a majority to be elected by staff as is found in institutions such as Cambridge and Oxford.

== Equality ==
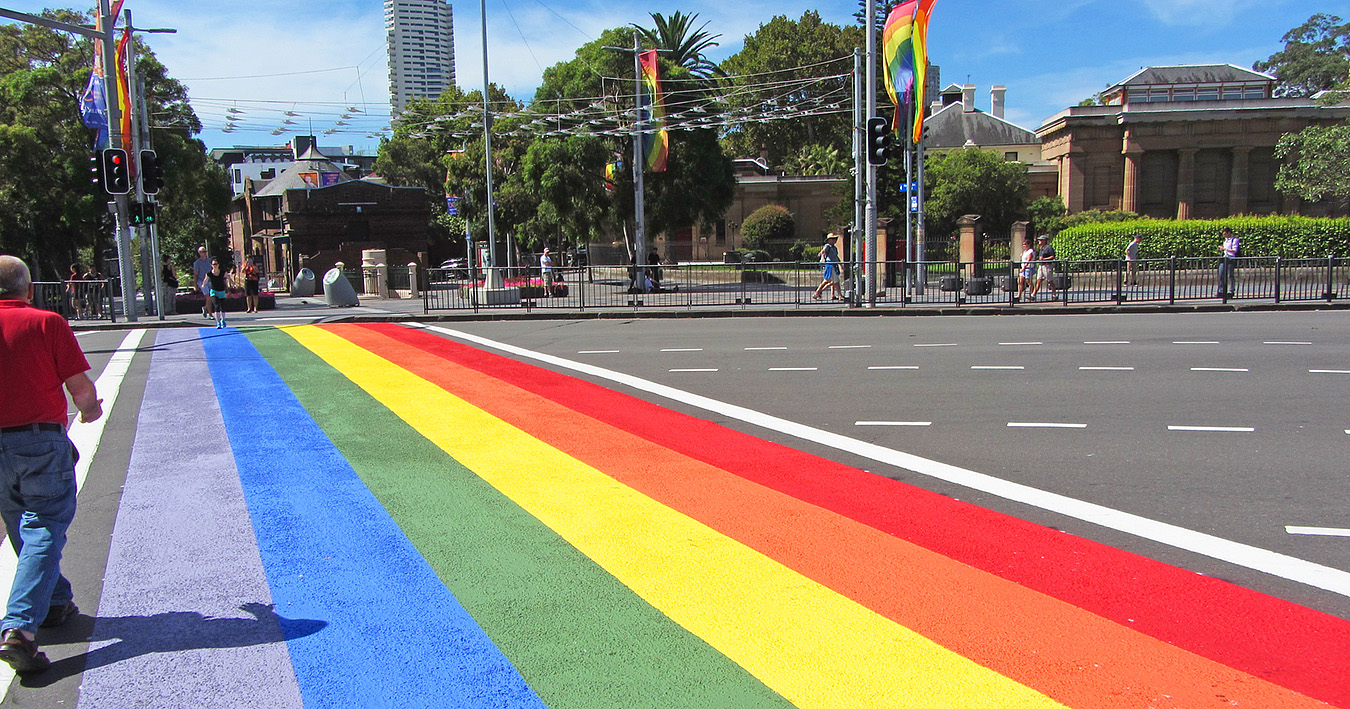
The Fair Work Commission, the Australian Human Rights Commission, and a patchwork of state regulators protect equality at work. Given structural obstacles, the gender pay gap remains at 21.7% according to employer surveys, and the Indigenous pay gap is over 33%.

Equal treatment is a fundamental right in international law because it has been universally recognised that people should be judged by the content of their character, their skills and knowledge, and not irrelevant characteristics. An equal treatment claim under the Fair Work Act 2009 enables a complaint to the Fair Work Commission, similar to other labour rights. By contrast, claims under the Racial Discrimination Act 1975, the Sex Discrimination Act 1984, Disability Discrimination Act 1992 and Age Discrimination Act 2004 enable a separate path for claims to the Australian Human Rights Commission, created in 1986, which may resolve disputes by conciliation, or if that is unsuccessful claims can go to federal court.

Within states, similar systems exist with a watchdog, and appeals to a Tribunal, for instance the Anti-Discrimination Board of NSW and then the NSW Civil and Administrative Tribunal, but claimants cannot bring proceedings at both federal and state level, and so must choose. The FWA 2009 section 27(1A) says that federal law does not exclude state anti-discrimination laws, meaning that greater protection can be provided by states where the federal government has not acted. Despite these rights to formal equality, structural problems (including unequal parental leave, and historic disadvantage) mean discrimination remains rife, so that the gender pay gap remains at 21.7% according to employer surveys, and the Indigenous pay gap is over 33%.

=== Adverse action and exceptions ===
The Fair Work Act 2009 section 351 enables complaints of discrimination to be made against "an employer" for "adverse action against a person who is an employee, or prospective employee". Independent contractors therefore must bring actions in state law where possible. The grounds for a complaint are based on five groups of protected characteristics, namely (a) race, colour, religion, political opinion, national extraction or social origin, (b) sex, sexual orientation, marital status, (c) age, (d) physical or mental disability, and (e) pregnancy, family or carer responsibility. If a complainant establishes that there is adverse action, and a prohibited ground, the onus of proof shifts to the employer which must prove that their reason for action was not tainted by the person's protected characteristic.

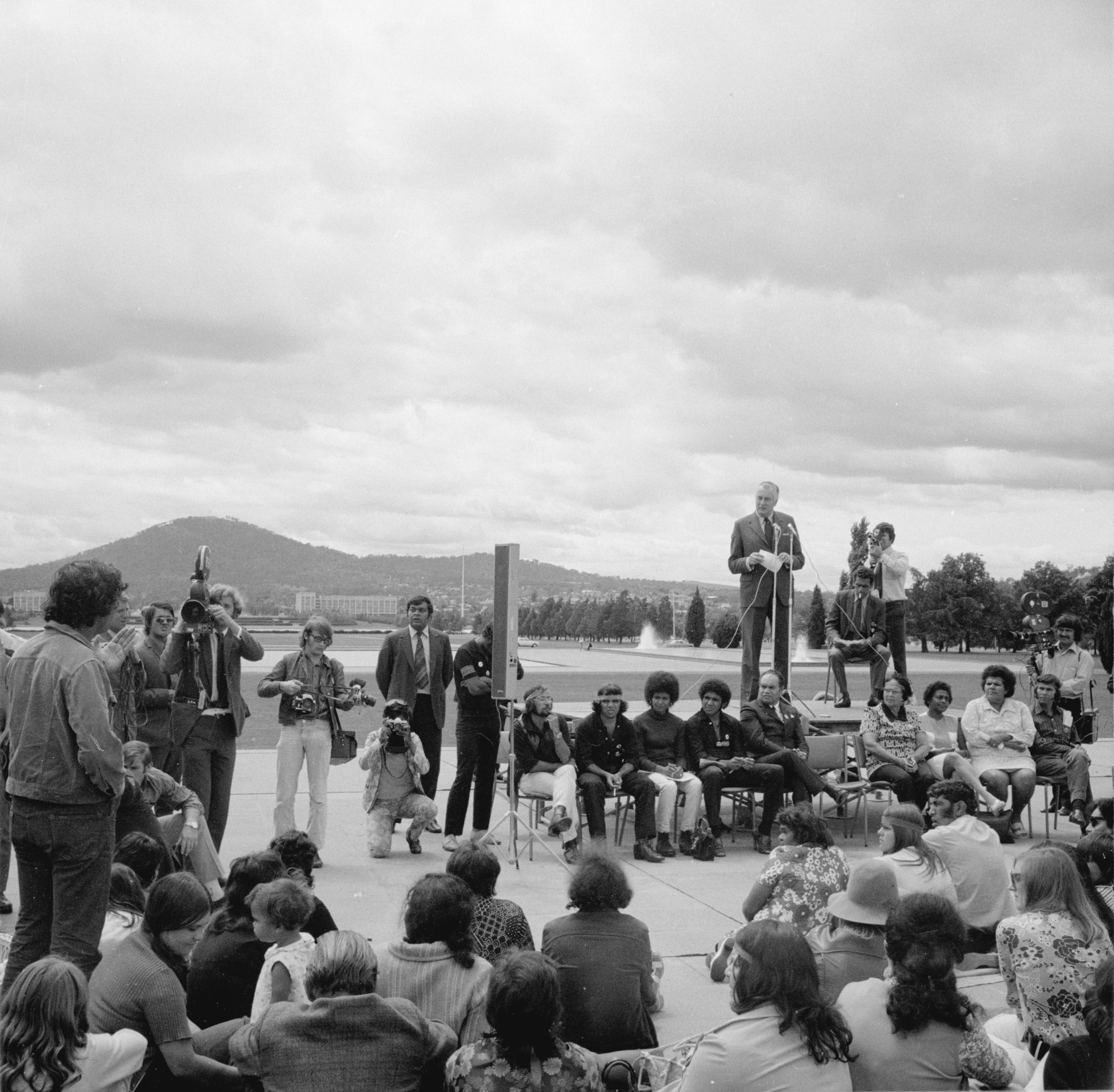
The Whitlam government passed the first Racial Discrimination Act 1975 to embed equal treatment based on race in workplaces.

A first main exception in section 351(2)(b) is the employer may show adverse action was permitted "because of the inherent requirements of the particular position concerned". For instance, a genuine occupational requirement might be a theatre employer requiring a woman to act in a female part. In one of the leading cases, Qantas Airways Ltd v Christie, a pilot over the age of 60 failed in a claim against Qantas, which had a blanket ban on pilots over the age of 60. The High Court accepted Qantas’ argument that being younger was an inherent requirement because regional aviation regulators restricted pilots over 60, meaning he could not fly internationally. The High Court more controversially, said that he could not be rostered solely for domestic flights because this could impair the employer’s roster management. Similarly controversial, in X v Commonwealth the High Court held in 1999 that it was lawful to dismiss a member of the Australian Defence Forces who was HIV positive, even though he was asymptomatic, on the ground that the illness risked infection of other personnel (even though that it medically untrue). McHugh J said that ‘carrying out the employment without endangering the safety of other employees is an inherent requirement of any employment’ (even though there is medically no danger). A second exception in section 351(2)(c) is that religious organisations with “doctrines, tenets, beliefs or teachings” may take action (even if otherwise adverse) in good faith to avoid injury to the religious susceptibilities of adherents of that religion or creed. According to the High Court in New Faith v Commissioner of Payroll Tax (Victoria) this will include all practices that would protect the “religious susceptibilities” of adherents to that faith.

A third exception in section 351(2)(a) is that employers are exempt from federal law if the action is "not unlawful under any anti-discrimination law in force in the place where the action is taken". In Rumble v The Partnerships the Fair Work Commission held that a law firm consultant, Dr Rumble, could lawfully be dismissed for publicly criticising the Department of Defence for ignoring problems of sexual misconduct in the defence forces, because breach of the firm's media comment policy was a valid reason for dismissal – and this was accepted to be lawful. But Perram J also gave the opinion that if the dismissal had taken place in NSW, which does not protect political opinions, then section 351(2)(a) would have defeated the claim.

=== Harassment and bullying ===
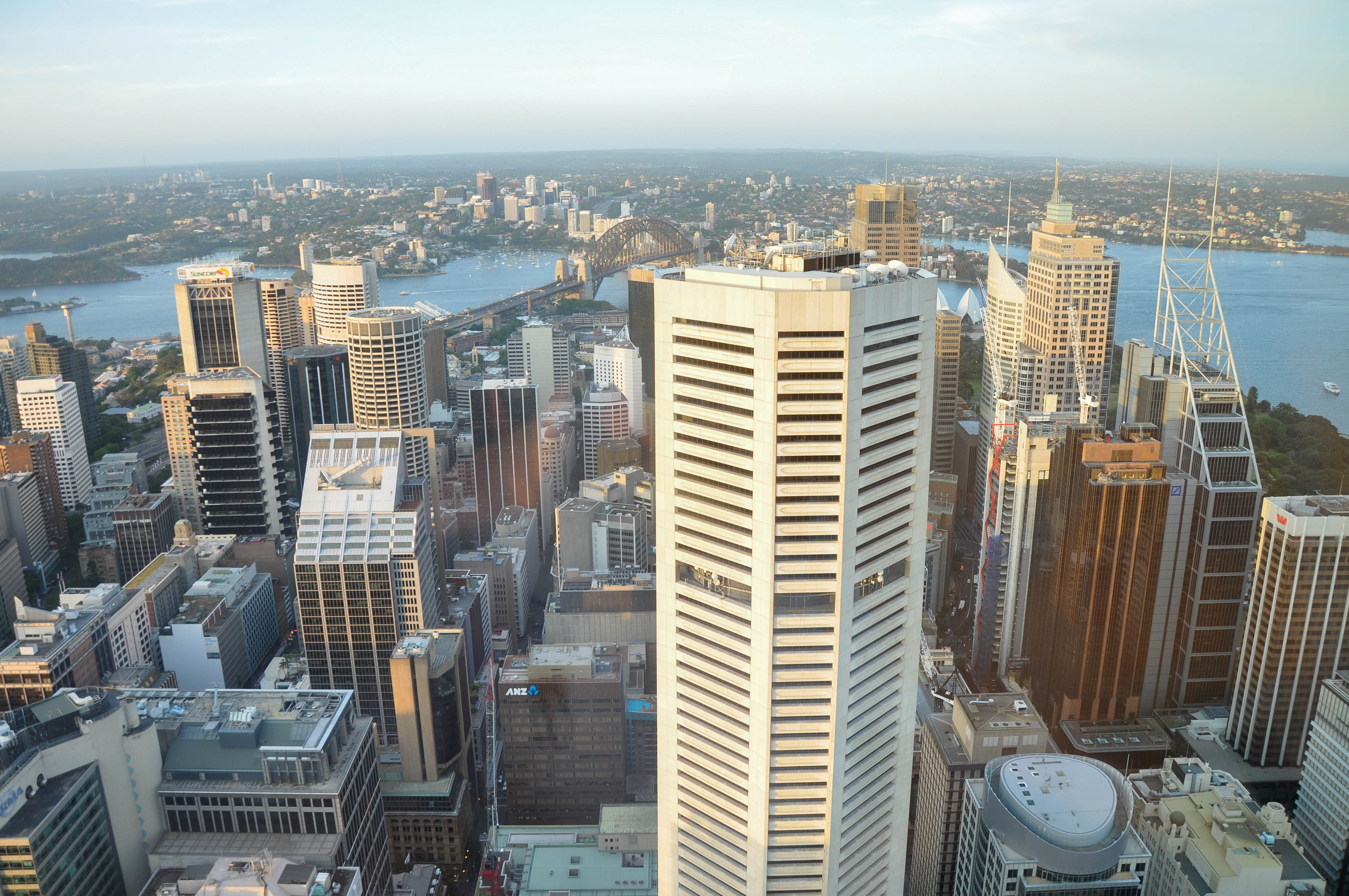
The Australian Human Rights Commission on Pitt Street, Sydney, has jurisdiction to investigate and resolve complaints of harassment and bullying, along with the Fair Work Commission.

Harassment and bullying are persistent problems, particularly when they relate to discriminatory conduct. Harassment is unlawful based on similar protected characteristics as general equal treatment rights in different statutes, although there is not yet a single coherent codification of standards. Disability Discrimination Act 1992 For example, under the Sex Discrimination Act 1984 section 28A, sexual harassment means conduct of a sexual nature, that is unwelcome, where a 'reasonable person' would have been offended, humiliated or intimidated'. This is also unlawful under the Australian Human Rights Commission Act 1986 section 3, and enables courts to pay compensate for loss or damage. Under section 28B it is unlawful for a person to sexually harass their employee, and employers are vicariously liable for conduct of any employee to another where a breach is "in connection with" employment. For example, in Richardson v Oracle Corporation Australia Pty Ltd the Federal Court awarded $130,000 in compensation for persistent sexual slurs against the claimant, who was forced to resign from her job, up from $18,000 given at first instance. In South Pacific Restor Hotels v Trainor an employer was held liable for harassment after work hours, but in accommodation provided by the employer. However employers may avoid liability if they have taken "all reasonable steps" to prevent harassment, which will usually mean swift action after a complaint.

The general law of tort may also provide remedies where an employer's breach of the duty of care results in particular harm, such as psychiatric injury. In Naidu v Group 4 Securitas Pty Ltd Mr Naidu, while working as a security guard through labour hire firm ISS Security at Nationwide News, was subjected to racial abuse, physical assault, threats to be fired and never work again, and making Mr Naidu work for free at the home of the abusive supervisor, Mr Chaloner. He was psychologically scarred, without a job and his marriage broke down as a result. On appeal, the NSW court upheld damages against Nationwide News of $1,767,050, but rejected damages against ISS on the basis that there was not a "reasonably foreseeable risk of cognisable psychiatric harm to the plaintiff", even though ISS was benefitting from Mr Naidu's labour as much as Nationwide News. Because the wider issue of bullying is a general problem, in 2013 the Fair Work Act 2009 Part 6-4B was added to prohibit being "bullied at work". This means repeated and unreasonable behaviour that creates a risk to health and safety. It includes "intimidation, coercion, threats, humiliation, shouting, sarcasm, victimisation, terrorising, singling-out, malicious pranks, physical abuse, verbal abuse, emotional abuse, belittling, bad faith, harassment, conspiracy to harm, ganging-up, isolation, freezing-out, ostracisim, innuendo, rumour-mongering, disrespect, mobbing, mocking, victim-blaming and discrimination." It must be repeated, and if so the Fair Work Commission may make an order for the behaviour to cease and to be corrected, and must do so within 14 days. This does not, however, result in compensation, and cannot be done if the bully or the victim are no longer employed. Ideally, employers should also act by having an anti-bullying policy and training its supervisors and workforce to create a cohesive culture at work.

=== Indirect discrimination ===
Although the Fair Work Act 2009 does not expressly distinguish direct and indirect discrimination as other federal legislation does, and state legislation does, if a rule that is neutral on its face has a disparate impact on one group, this will also be unlawful. For example, in Australian Iron & Steel Pty Ltd v Banovic an employer’s policy for redundancy based on “last in, first off” was held to be indirect discrimination against women, who at that mining workplace has mostly only been recently employed. Similarly in Song v Ainsworth Game Technology Pty Ltd a woman won a claim for indirect discrimination, after she was told she could not work full time, and also use her break time to transfer her child from school to after school care. Such a rule disparately impacted women, especially since it was found that other staff could take cigarette breaks without reducing their work hours.

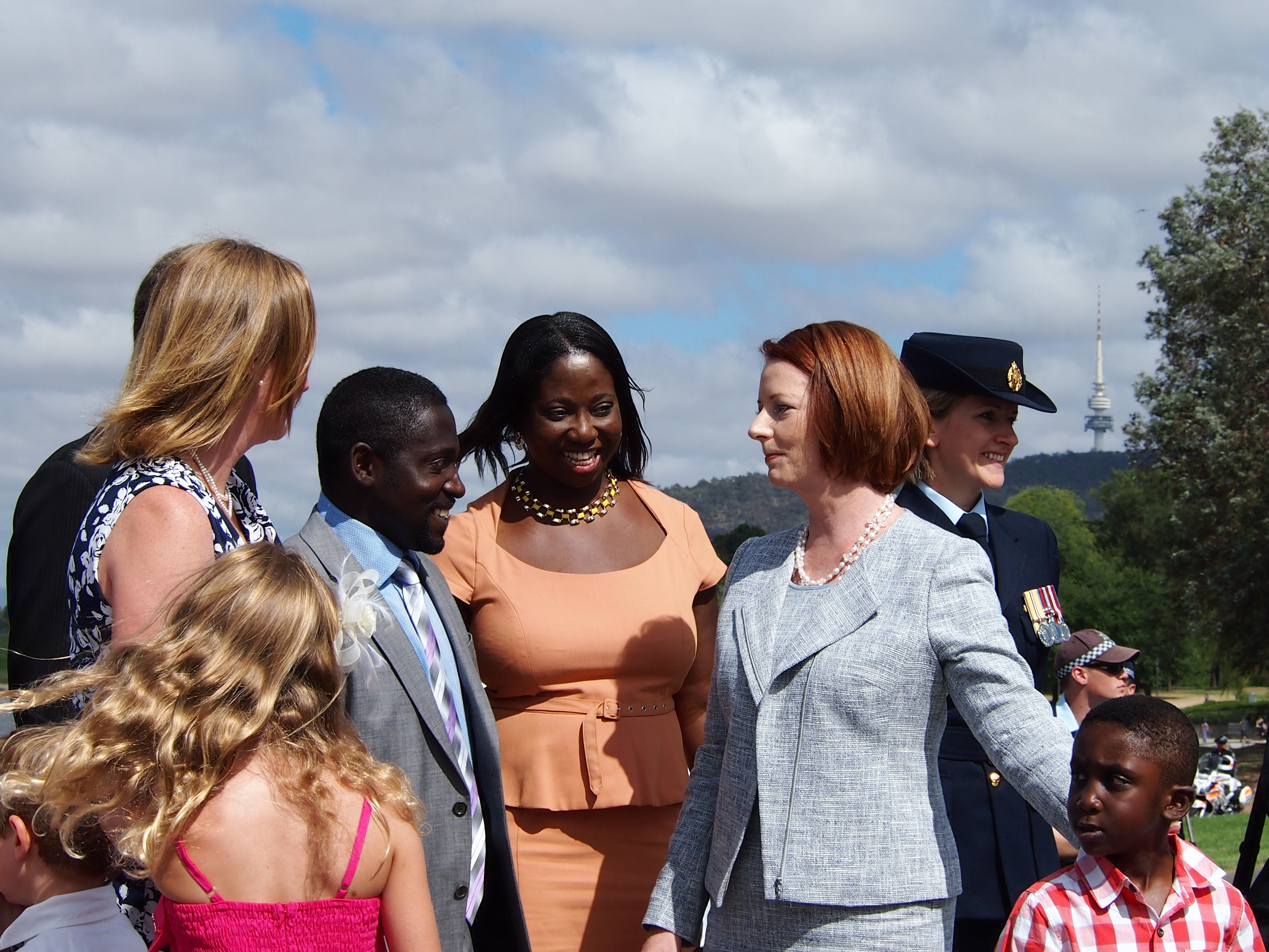
The Gillard government passed the first protections against discrimination for sexual orientation, gender identity, and intersex status, reforming the Sex Discrimination Act 1984.

Indirect discrimination is often structural, and this is seen in the gender pay gap of 21.7% across the Australian workforce, meaning women employees earn on average 78.3 cents compared to each $1 for male employees, according to the annual employer census. The main reasons for the gender pay gap are sex discrimination in child care and parental leave laws based on "persistent cultural norms that see women as more likely to undertake primary carer duties for children and family", "outright gender-based discrimination at work", "patterns of workforce engagement" and occupational segregation.

Under the Fair Work Act 2009 section 302, employees, unions and the Sex Discrimination Commissioner can make an equal pay claim. The first post-2009 cases were brought by unions for social and community service workers, supported by the government. The Fair Work Commission interprets the appropriate comparator narrowly. Before 2009, the Librarians case, librarians were awarded a pay increase since the skill and education levels were comparable to better paid male-dominated industries.

Structural discrimination also underlies much of the race pay gap in Australia. The first time Indigenous employees became legally entitled to equal pay with white workers, in cattle and farming jobs, was through a decision in 1966. The exclusion in the Conciliation and Arbitration Act 1904 section 4 for "persons engaged in domestic service" meant that many Indigenous women and girls employed as domestic staff were excluded. The Racial Discrimination Act 1975 created the first general right against race discrimination. However, in 2019 the median adjusted weekly household income for Indigenous Australians over 15 was just $623 compared to $935 for non-Indigenous residents, a 33.3% race pay gap. In 2016, the census showed a 72% employment for non-Indigenous Australians compared to a 47% employment rate for Indigenous Australians. There have not yet been institutions to set aside a portion of the funds from Australia's natural resources for Indigenous Australian well-being, nor are there yet clear principles established to ensure that historic disadvantage is undone, as in South Africa, India, or Europe, through positive action.

=== Positive action and disability ===
Positive action is designed to remedy historical disadvantage, but Australia has very few measures at federal level. Under the Disability Discrimination Act 1992 sections 4 to 6 require that an employer must make reasonable adjustments to accommodate people with disabilities at work. However, under section 11 the employer may escape this duty if they show that it would impose an unjustifiable hardship, taking account of the expenses and the employer’s capacity to afford it. For example, in Daghlian v Australian Postal Corporation it was held to be a reasonable adjustment that the employer provided a stool for a worker who would otherwise usually be required to stand. This modifies the “inherent requirements” defence found in section 21A(1)(b).

== Job security ==
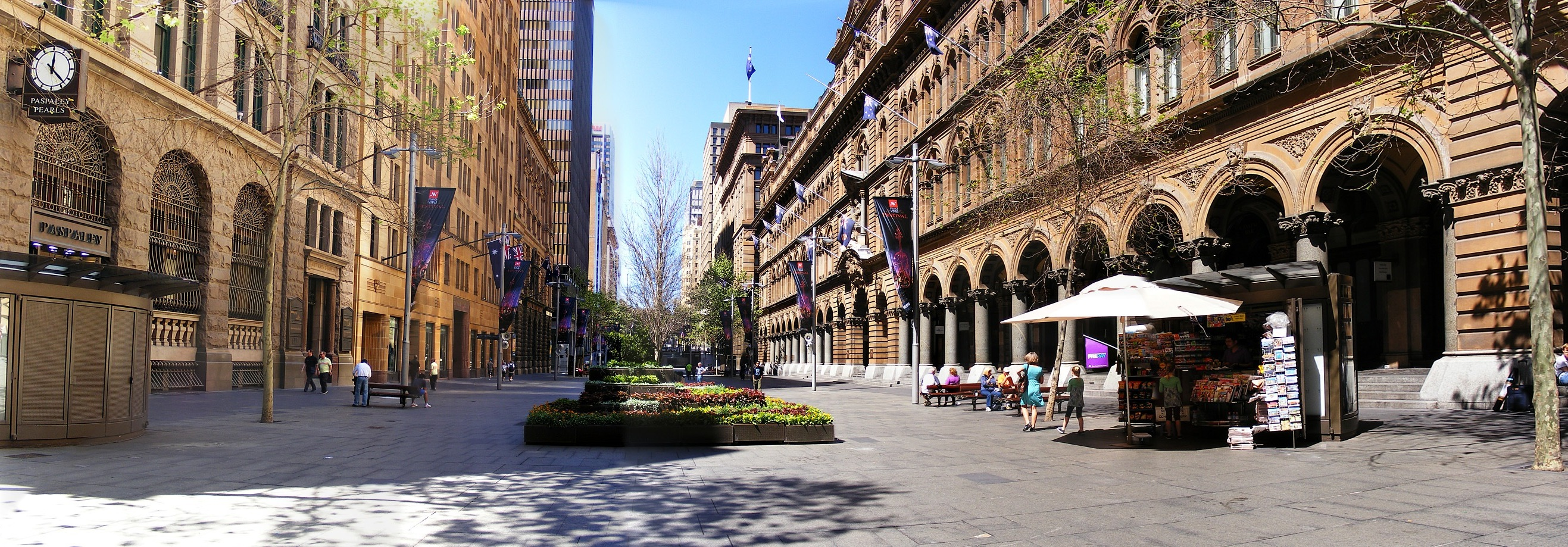
The Reserve Bank of Australia, at Martin Place, Sydney, holds monetary policy powers for a stable currency, "the maintenance of full employment in Australia", and "economic prosperity and welfare of the people of Australia".

Job security, as part of social security, is a universal human right in international law, and with full employment it is the basis of economic stability and prosperity. Most Australian employees are entitled to reasonable notice before any dismissal, fair reasons and a procedure before being dismissed, and a redundancy payment. Both state and federal governments have a duty to ensure full employment through fiscal policy, while by law the Reserve Bank of Australia must also achieve a stable currency, full employment, and prosperity and welfare for the people of Australia.

=== Reasonable notice ===
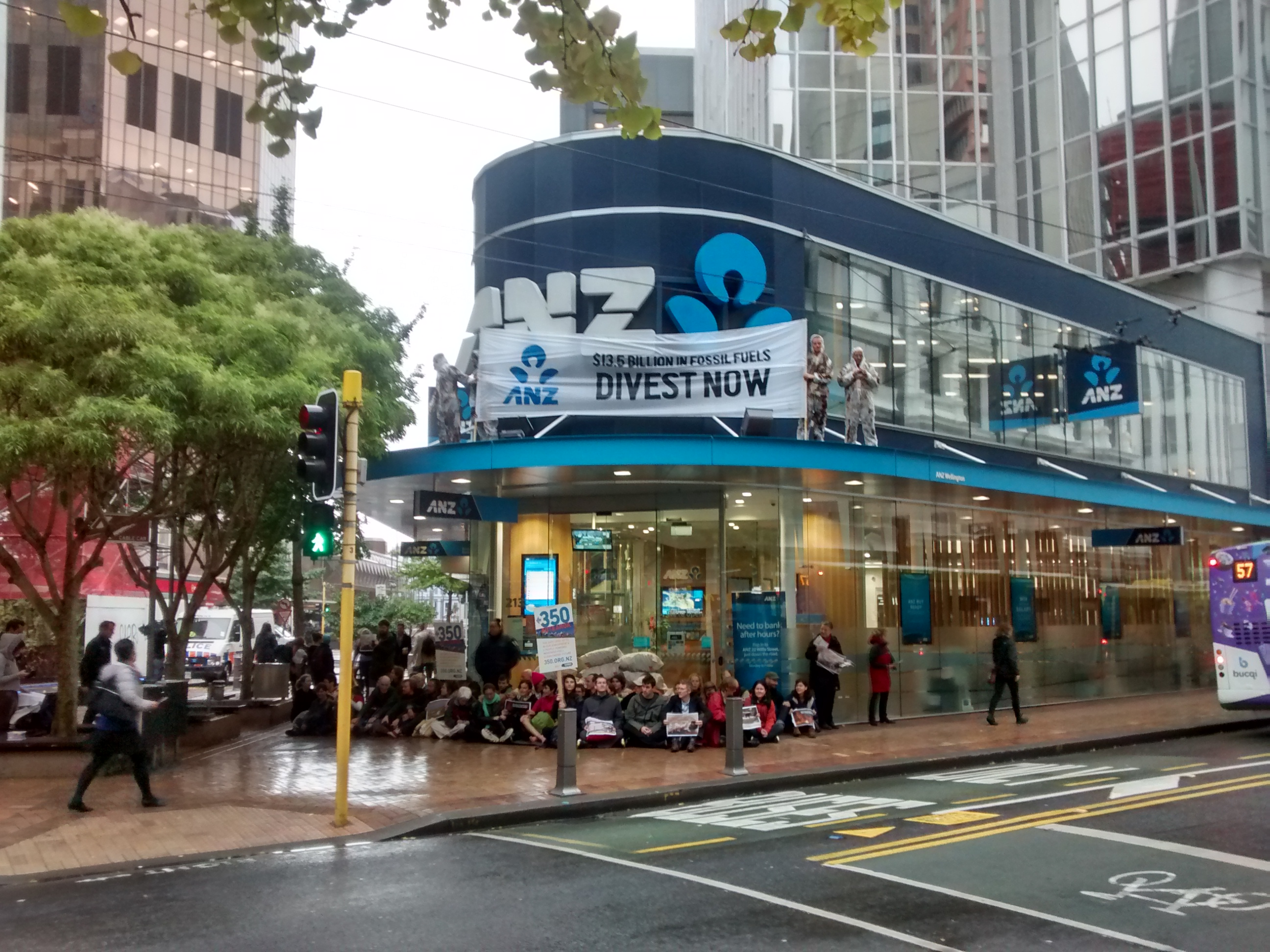
In 2016, ANZ Bank was forced to pay $110,000 in damages – reflecting 4 months' contractual notice – to Mr Bartlett after falsely accusing, and firing, him for sending confidential information to an Australian Financial Review journalist, when they had no proof he did it.

In Australian law, most employees have the right to reasonable notice before dismissal, and dismissals must be for a fair reason, however these rights are not universally upheld. At common law, everyone has the right to reasonable notice before either side terminates a contract. The longer that people work for an employer, the more notice becomes reasonable, reflecting the concept of mutual respect. For example, in Quinn v Jack Chia (Australia) Mr Quinn had been initially hired on a contract with a one-month notice, but had worked for years, taking on senior responsibilities, and making personal sacrifices for his employer. The court held he was entitled to 12 months, not one month as the contract had said, given his length of service, seniority and dedication over the years.

A longer period of notice could also be expressly or impliedly agreed. For instance, in Walker v Citigroup Global Markets Australia Pty Ltd an investment banker was promised during negotiations that if he took a new position he would get a guarantee bonus after a year's work, and a higher job title, but before the job had begun the employer terminated and argued that Walker was due only one month's notice according to the standard termination clause. The Federal Court held that despite the termination clause, the promise of a bonus indicated the contract was meant to run for at least one year, so Walker was awarded damages for a year, plus damages for loss of opportunity to remain in employment longer.

As well as these common law standards, the Fair Work Act 2009 section 117 requires a bare minimum of 1 week's notice before 1 year, 2 weeks' notice for 2 years, 3 weeks' notice for over 3 years, and 4 weeks' notice for over 5 years, but also an extra week for employees over 45 years old who have worked more than 2 years. Modern awards can and often do have higher standards, and so do collective agreements. The dominant view is that courts may find greater notice is warranted where the facts speak in favour, because statute's purpose is to create a floor of rights, not a ceiling, that common law may improve upon, not undercut. An employer may give pay in lieu of notice under section 117(2) and terminate the contract if this has been accepted by the employee.

The one situation where notice is not required is where a party commits a serious breach of contract. In these cases, an employee can quit on the spot and claim damages, or an employer can dismiss the employee. According to Bartlett v ANZ Banking Group Ltd a serious breach of the employment contract can include deliberate disobedience of a lawful and reasonable order, breaching the duty of fidelity (e.g. by taking secret commissions), or serious incompetence. In this case, an ANZ Bank employee won damages for wrongful dismissal on appeal, measured by 4 months notice that his contract required, since ANZ could not prove he had actually engaged in misconduct of sending confidential information to a journalist at the Australian Financial Review, and the employer had an obligation to act reasonably. This default position at common law may be replaced with contractual procedures before dismissal, but if not, an employer must simply show a sound reason for summary dismissal.

=== Fair reasons and process ===
Because common law judges historically gave inadequate remedies for workers who were dismissed, and let employers dictate the terms of dismissal by contract, the Fair Work Act 2009 section 382 contains the right to be "protected from unfair dismissal", if the person is an employee, and under section 383 they have been working for at least 6 months, or one year for an employee of an employer with under 15 staff. Small businesses may have a defence if they comply with the Small Business Fair Dismissal Code. In addition, employees must be covered by an award or enterprise agreement, and have an income below $167,500 in July 2023 (the "high income threshold"). Another exception is that "casual" employees have no rights unless they have a "reasonable expectation of continuing employment by the employer on a regular and systematic basis". In Ponce v DJT Staff Management Services a traffic controller employed through a labour hire firm, and classed as "casual", had unpredictable work shifts and some breaks in work, but was still held to have had work on a regular and systematic basis. Unlike in most high income countries, the Fair Work Act 2009 fails to treat expiry of fixed-term contracts as a dismissal that must be fair. The meaning of dismissal includes termination, or being forced to resign by the employer's conduct, or demotion with a significant reduction of pay or duties.

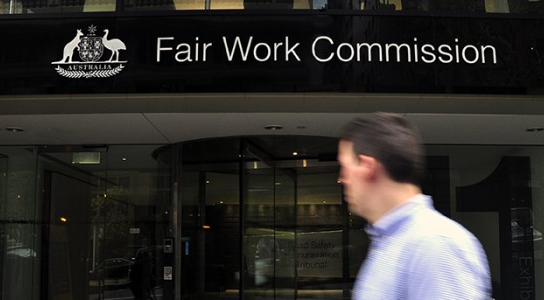
The Fair Work Commission deals with complaints of unfair dismissal, but employees must apply within 21 days, and any damages are limited to 26 weeks pay, no matter how great the harm.

A dismissal will be "unfair" if it is "harsh, unjust or unreasonable", and according to the High Court in Byrne v Australian Airlines this includes the concept of the employer whose action "is disproportionate to the gravity of the misconduct" of the employee. Under section 387, the Fair Work Commission should consider factors including the employee's capacity and conduct, notice given, an opportunity to respond to any allegation, representation given, warnings before dismissal, and the enterprise's size and HR specialists. For example, in Pastrycooks Employees, Biscuit Makers Employees and Flour and Sugar Goods Workers Union (NSW) v Gartrell it was held too harsh to dismiss a bakery worker who refused to do a last minute delivery on his way home. In Agnew v Nationwide News Pty Ltd it was held to be unfair to fire employees who drank alcohol at lunchtime, because even though the company had a policy against this it was not consistently enforced especially among managers. In B, C and D v Australian Postal Corporation it was held to be unfair to dismiss three employees who accessed pornography at work because though there was a policy, it was not consistently enforced and there were no prior warnings to the three who were caught. According to the Fair Work Commission, it is relevant whether the employee has a past disciplinary history, whether an employer has a "history of toleration or condonation of the misconduct", and the employees' past conduct, length of service and consequences for dependents. By contrast in Fussell v Transport for NSW it was held fair to dismiss an employee who sent "an offensive image of his own anatomy" over Snapchat to a colleague who he thought was a private friend - even though he immediately apologised. Under section 390, the Fair Work Commission can order compensation or reinstatement, though in 2018 to 2019 of 8161 unfair dismissal conciliation cases, only 57 settlements included reinstatement, and of 229 arbitration cases just 13 resulted in reinstatement. Under section 392, compensation is limited to 26 weeks' pay or half the high income threshold, regardless of the actual economic loss, distress or social cost of the dismissal. To claim, claimants must fill in a form on the FWC website within 21 days of the dismissal date, and extensions are rarely granted. The employer is asked to respond, there is a telephone conference, and if not resolved the FWC can determine the case by arbitration. The FWC only allows appeals if it thinks there is a question of public interest. An employer's refusal to follow an order can be pursued in Federal Court.

=== Redundancy and transmissions ===
A dismissal for redundancy means that a job is no longer economically necessary for an employer's operations. To ensure the power of dismissal is not misused, the law attempts to ensure that the social costs of unemployment and dislocation are factored into the employer's decisions. Under the Fair Work Act 2009 section 531(2), employers must consult with unions if they contemplate that 15 or more jobs could be redundant, and under section 530 the employer must also give written notice to Centrelink of any proposals.

The goal of the law is to avoid job losses, and so under section 531(3) the employer must consult unions on proposals on "measures to avert or minimise the proposed dismissals", alternative employment or mitigating adverse effects of proposed redundancies. If redundancies must take place, the National Employment Standard in section 119 requires minimum redundancy payments of at least 4 weeks' pay for employees that have worked over 1 year to 16 weeks' pay for people with at least 9 years' work, while those over 10 years' work may take advantage of long service leave and redundancy pay. However, employees can not take redundancy if they have been offered an acceptable alternative job.

There are also a series of arbitrary exceptions to redundancy rights. Employees of employers with under 15 staff get nothing, on the theory that small businesses need protection more than workers. Casual, trainee and weekly fixed term employees are also excluded from protection, even though this means around 22% of the Australian workforce. Finally, if an employer is insolvent, at common law the insolvency terminates contracts on reasonable notice. To protect pay, under the Fair Entitlements Guarantee Act 2012 the federal government has a scheme for payments to employees whose wages are not otherwise covered.

=== Full employment ===
- White Paper on Full Employment in Australia (1945) – defined economic policy for 30 years
- Reserve Bank Act 1959 s 10
- NAIRU reporting
- Fiscal policy
- Full employment and industrial policy
- Unemployment insurance
- Workforce Australia, Employment Services Act 1994

== Constitutional and state laws ==
The Barger decision was made in the context of the then prevailing reserved State powers doctrine, which was itself overturned in 1920 in the Engineers case.

Since 2005, Australian industrial relations laws, such as WorkChoices, have been primarily based on the corporations power in section 51(xx) of the Constitution, which enables labour laws to be of much wider reach, without the constraints imposed by the conciliation and arbitration power. The corporations power gives the federal parliament power to make laws with respect to "trading and financial corporations formed within the limits of the Commonwealth", as well as 'foreign' corporations.

=== State law ===
The Victorian Government has referred most of its industrial relations powers to the Commonwealth, most recently via the Fair Work (Commonwealth Powers) Act 2009 (Vic), resulting in a majority of public sector workers in Victoria being covered by the FW Act.

== See also ==
- Electrolux v AWU (2004)
- Hancock Report (1985)

International:

- European labour law
- UK labour law
- US labor law
- ILO Conventions
