= Taxation of superannuation in Australia =

Superannuation in Australia is taxed by the Australian taxation system at three points: on contributions received by a superannuation fund, on investment income earned by the fund, and on benefits paid by the fund.

== Tax on contributions ==
=== Types of contributions ===
Superannuation contributions are either concessional or non-concessional contributions. Concessional contributions (sometimes referred to as "before-tax" contributions) are contributions for which someone (such as an employer) has or will receive a tax deduction. Concessional contributions include superannuation guarantee (SG) contributions, salary sacrifice contributions, other employer contributions and contributions claimed as a personal tax deduction. Concessional contributions are taxed in the fund. While taxable components do not change the tax payable by the superannuation fund, they may be a factor in calculating the tax payable on withdrawals from a super fund.

Non-concessional contributions (also referred to as "undeducted" or "after-tax" contributions) are contributions for which no-one has or will receive a tax deduction. Non-concessional contributions are, generally, not taxed in the fund.

=== Contribution caps ===
Contributions to superannuation funds are subject to two types of "caps", and a third has been proposed in the 2016 federal budget. The annual concessional contributions cap since 2014/15 has been $30,000, with the cap for people over the age of 49 at the start of each year being $35,000. Concessional contributions are assessable income of the fund taxed at 15%. Concessional contributions in excess of the annual "concessional contributions cap" is included in the member's taxable income, taxed at their marginal tax rate, plus an excess concessional contributions charge, on top of the 15% already applying to concessional contributions. In the 2016 federal budget, the government proposed to reduce, effective 1 July 2016, the annual before-tax contributions limit to $25,000.

Since 2014/15, the annual non-concessional contributions cap was $180,000 (or $540,000 in a three-year period under the bring-forward rule), up from $150,000 and $450,000 previously. Non-concessional contributions under the "non-concessional contributions cap" are not taxed in the fund. However, if the annual non-concessional contributions cap is exceeded a tax rate of 46.5% applies to the excess. In the 2016 federal budget, the government proposed to change, effective 1 July 2016, the non-concessional contributions cap to a lifetime cap of $500,000 instead of the annual cap of $180,000 and the abolition of the bring-forward rule.

In the 2016 federal budget, the government proposed to create, effective 1 July 2017, a new cap of $1.6 million on amounts that can be moved into the tax-free pension phase, where previously there was no such limit. Members who have a balance in a retirement phase account in excess of this limit had until 30 June 2017 to either return the excess funds into accumulation phase or take the money out of superannuation. Retirement phase accounts in excess of this limit will be taxed at 15% on earnings, the same as for an accumulation phase account.

== Investment income of superannuation funds ==
=== Exempt income ===
The investment income of superannuation funds derived from those assets backing pensions (i.e., retirement phase accounts) is "exempt" income of the fund. In the 2016 federal budget, the government proposed to abolish, effective 1 July 2017, the exemption for investment income on a retirement phase account if the balance in the account exceeds $1.6 million. Where all the members of a fund are retired with balances below this threshold then the whole of the fund's income is tax exempt. Where a fund has its members split between non-retired and retired phases then it is necessary to have an actuary to certify the proportion of the fund's income that is exempt (unless the pension assets are fully segregated). This is done by way of obtaining an annual actuarial certificate.

=== Assessable income ===
All other investment income of superannuation funds is generally assessable income of the fund and subject to a 15% tax.

=== Allowable deductions ===
Expenses of the superannuation fund, such as administration expenses, investment management expenses and insurance premiums, are allowable deductions against the fund income. Life insurance premiums paid by the fund are also deductible by the fund from assessable income; while the same premium if paid directly by the individual member may not be tax deductible.

== Capital gains ==
Where an investment or other asset is sold or otherwise disposed, the profit on sale is subject to a capital gains tax.

Superannuation funds can claim a capital gains tax discount where the asset has been owned for at least 12 months. The discount applicable to superannuation funds is 33%, reducing the effective tax rate on capital gains from 15% to 10%.

No discount or adjustment is available if an asset is sold at a loss. Capital losses can only be applied against capital gains and cannot be claimed against other income, but may be carried forward to the next year and applied against the later year's capital gains.

== Taxation ==
=== Taxable income ===
The taxable income of a superannuation fund is the fund's assessable income less allowable deductions. Assessable income includes concessional (i.e., taxable) contributions received, net investment income and discounted capital gains. It does not include exempt income and undeducted contributions. Undeducted contributions are those which the employer or the member cannot or has chosen not to claim as a deduction from their respective assessable income.

=== Tax rates ===
The taxable income of a superannuation fund is taxed at a flat rate of 15%; however, concessional contributions of those members whose taxable income exceeds $300,000 are subject to a rate of 30%. In the 2016 federal budget, the government proposed to reduce, effective from 1 July 2017, the threshold when the tax rate of 30% comes in to members whose taxable income exceeds $250,000.

In reality, the actual average tax rate can be lower than this, typically around 6.5%, because:

- the dividend imputation system allows a credit for imputation credits on Australian shares, which may result in a tax refund.
- capital gains on assets held more than 12 months may be entitled to a capital gain tax discount.
- other tax credits such as foreign tax credits may apply.

Additional taxes are payable if contributions received exceed the applicable contribution caps.

=== Tax credits ===
If the taxable income includes dividend income, any imputation credits attached to those dividends form part of the fund income, either assessable or exempt. In either case, the fund is entitled to a tax credit for the imputation credits as if they are a credit for tax paid by the fund. If the credits exceed the fund's tax liability, the excess is refundable.

=== Government "co-contribution" ===
Personal (nonconcessional, after-tax) contributions by members whose taxable income is less than $35,454 will attract a government "co-contribution" of 50c for each $1 contributed, up to a total of $500. The co-contribution shades out and stops entirely when the member's taxable income exceeds $50,454.

== Tax on benefits paid ==
Taxation of benefits is very complex and depends on whether:

- the benefit is received as a lump sum or a pension
- the benefit is received for retirement, death or disability
- the benefit is paid to a dependent or non-dependent
- the tax payer was a member of a fund prior to 1983

Other factors that could affect the tax liability of benefits include the level of undeducted contributions made and other components such as transfers of amounts from the sale of a small business. Generally for a lump sum superannuation payout (called an "eligible termination benefit"):

- the portion of the benefit relating to undeducted contributions is tax free.
- the remaining amount below the low tax threshold ($160,000 in 2010/11 for those 55 and older) is tax free, with the low tax threshold being indexed annually by Average Weekly Overtime Earnings in increments of $5,000.
- amounts above that are generally taxed at 15% plus the Medicare levy.

For recipients of social security payments, pension amounts are taxed as normal income through the PAYG system except where there is a deduction for the portion of the benefits funded by undeducted contributions (the "deductible amount") or at a 15% rebate on the pension amount less the deductible amount.

Special arrangements applied for benefits which exceeded the reasonable benefit limits. These rules ceased on 1 July 2007.

Since 1 July 2007, no taxes are payable on benefits paid to members over age 60, one of the measures arising from the 2006 federal budget.

== See also ==
- Taxation in Australia
