= Rasa =

Rasa or RASA may refer to:

== Indian culture ==
- Rasa (aesthetics), a concept in the Indian performing arts
- Rasa (theology), a concept of nectar or emotional rapture related to Krishna devotion
- Rasā, a mythical river mentioned in the Rigveda
- Rasa lila, a dance performed by the Hindu god Krishna with his consort Radha and other milkmaids
- Rasa (literary form), an early literary form of Gujarati literature and Apabhramsa
- Rasa, the nutritive fluid that flows in the body and nourishes all other tissues according to Ayurveda

== People ==
- Rasa von Werder (born 1945), German-Lithuanian bodybuilder and author.
- Rasa Budbergytė (born 1960), a politician of the Social Democratic Party of Lithuania
- Rasa Drazdauskaitė (born 1981), a Lithuanian long-distance runner
- Rasa Juknevičienė (born 1958), a Lithuanian politician
- Rasa Kaušiūtė (born 1977), Lithuanian singer and composer
- Rasa Mažeikytė (born 1976), a Lithuanian cyclist
- Rasa Polikevičiūtė (born 1970), a Lithuanian cycle racer

== Places ==
- Rasa Island, in Palawan, Philippines
- Rasa Island, Japan, the old name of Oki Daitō, an uninhabited Japanese island
- Raša, Istria County, a town in Croatia
- Rasa, Malaysia, a town in Selangor, Malaysia
- Raša (river), a river in Istria, Croatia
- Rasa (Argeș), a river in southern Romania
- Rasa, a village in Grădiștea, Călărași, Romania
- Rasa, Ticino, a hamlet in the Swiss canton of Ticino
- Rasa di Varese, a hamlet in the Italian province of Varese
- Rasa, the former name of Lhasa, Tibet

== Other uses ==
- Rasa (band), a musical duo formed in 1998
- Rasa (mythology), a Lithuanian goddess
- Rasa (restaurant), a restaurant in Burlingame, California
- RASA (restaurant), a restaurant in Toronto
- Rasa, a character in Mobile Suit Gundam 00
- Rasa, one of several Lithuanian names for Saint Jonas' Festival
- Relative accessible surface area, a measure of residue solvent exposure
- Relative apparent synapomorphy analysis, a taxonomy term
- Roosevelt Academy Student Association, Student Association of Liberal Arts Honors College in Middelburg, The Netherlands
- Rowe-Ackermann Schmidt Astrograph, an aberration-free wide-field imaging telescope based on the Schmidt-Cassegrain Telescope.
- Tabula rasa, an epistemological thesis
- Druskininkų Rasa, a Lithuanian manufacturer of bottled natural mineral water and soft drinks

== See also ==
- Rasaleela (disambiguation)
- Rasah, a town in Negeri Sembilan, Malaysia
- Rassa (disambiguation)
- Raza (disambiguation)
- Ras (disambiguation)
- Raas (disambiguation)
