= Rassa =

Rassa may refer to:

- Rässa, a village in Saare County, Estonia
- Rassa, Piedmont, town in Italy
- Refugee Advocacy Service of South Australia
- Kalevi Rassa (1936–1963), Finnish hockey player
- Rassa or ryasa or rason, the word for a cassock in the Eastern Orthodox church
- Rassa, alternative spelling for the village of Rassau in Wales
- Rassa, variante spelling for the region of Raška in Latin sources

== See also ==
- Rasa (disambiguation)
- Raška (disambiguation)
- Rassas, surname
