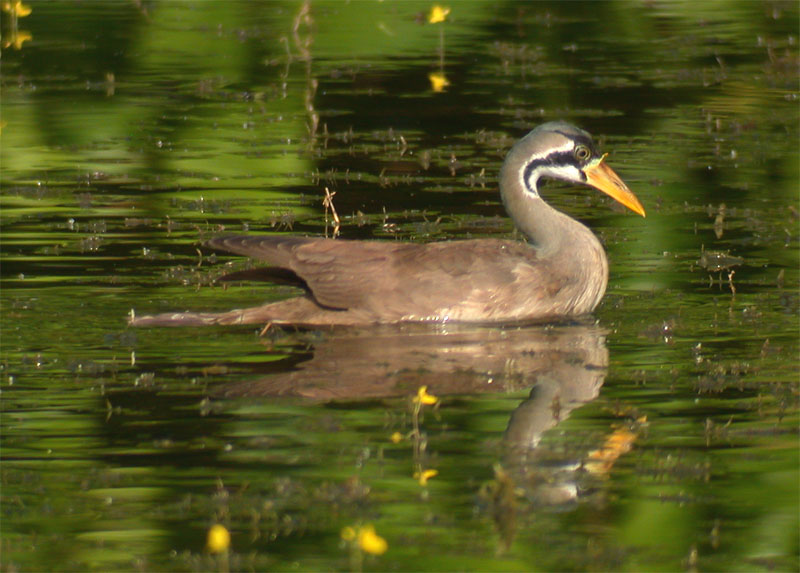

Conservation status
- Critically Endangered (IUCN 3.1)

Scientific classification
- Kingdom: Animalia
- Phylum: Chordata
- Class: Aves
- Order: Gruiformes
- Family: Heliornithidae
- Genus: Heliopais; Sharpe, 1893
- Species: H. personatus

Binomial name
- Heliopais personatus (G.R. Gray, 1849)

Synonyms
- Heliopais personata Gray, 1849; Podica personata Gray, 1849

= Masked finfoot =

Masked finfoot Temporal range: Late Miocene to present

Species of bird

The masked finfoot or Asian finfoot (Heliopais personatus) is a highly endangered aquatic bird that was formerly distributed throughout the fresh and brackish wetlands of the eastern Indian subcontinent, Indochina, Malaysia and Indonesia. Like the rest of the family, the African finfoot and the sungrebe, the relationship to other birds is poorly understood.

== Evolution ==
Unusually, phylogenetic evidence indicates that the masked finfoot is closely related to the Neotropical sungrebe, despite the African finfoot being geographically closer to both of them than either the sungrebe or masked finfoot are to each other. This suggests that the common ancestor of Heliopais and Heliornis diverged in the Old World during the mid-Tertiary, with the ancestral Heliornis colonizing the Americas via Beringia. Finfoots appear to have poor dispersal capabilities over marine habitats, which may explain why such a complex process was needed to colonize the Americas as opposed to overwater dispersal from Africa.

=== Fossil record ===
The genus Heliopais appears to have had a much wider distribution in the past, as an isolated humerus assigned to Heliopais aff. personata is known from the Late Miocene (Messinian)-aged Adu Asa Formation of Chad. This suggests that during the Miocene, Heliopais ranged as far west as northern Africa. Since that time, the range of Heliopais has shrunk to southeast Asia, leaving Podica as the only finfoot genus in Africa.

== Description ==
The masked finfoot is an underwater specialist with a long neck, a striking sharp beak, and lobed feet which are green. Both males and females have a black mask and eyebrow that contrasts with a white eyering and lateral cervical stripe. The rest of the neck is grey, the breast is pale and the back, wings, and tail are a rich brown. The males have an all-black chin while the females have a white chin.

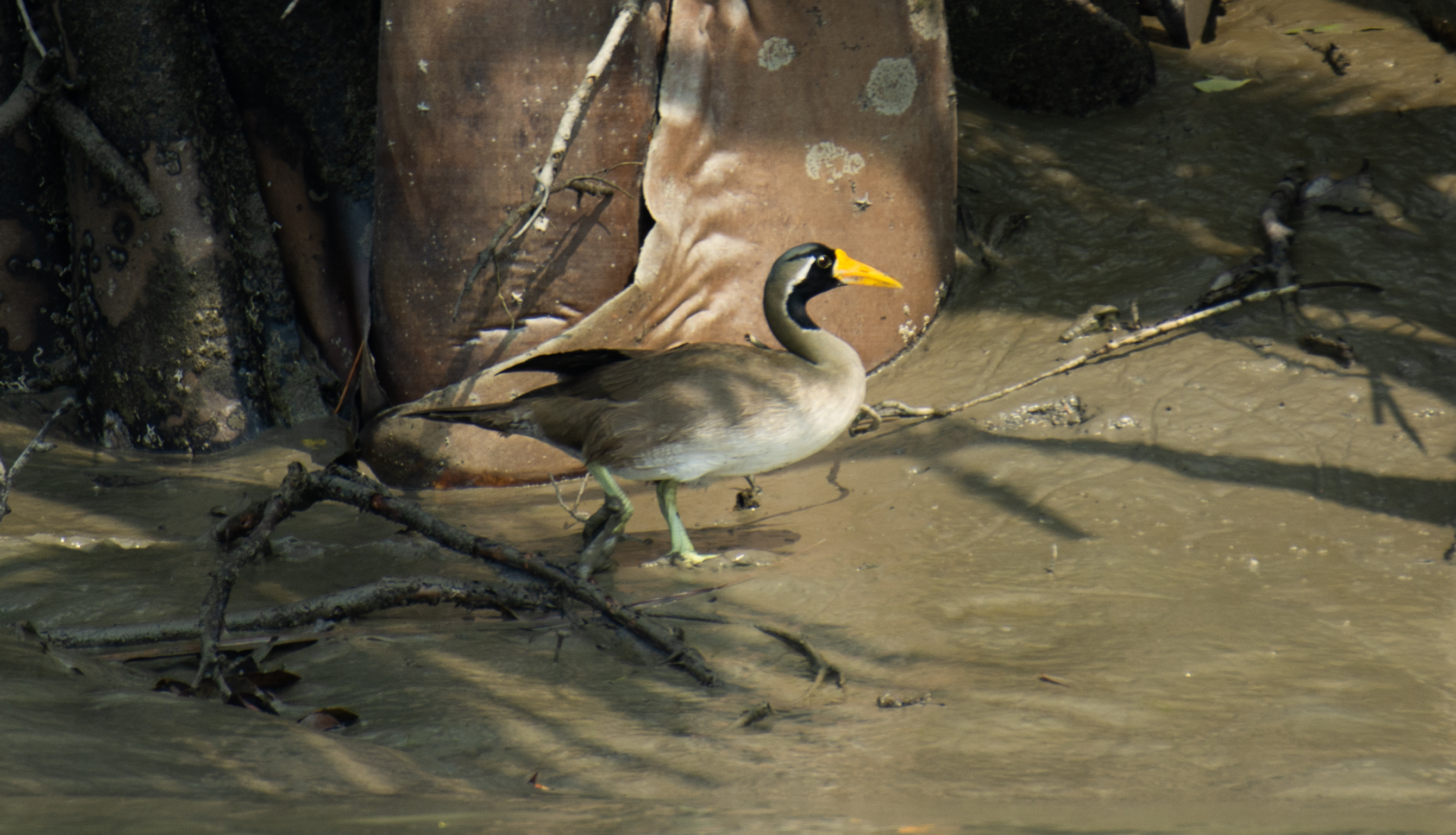
An adult male Masked Finfoot in the Sundarbans

== Distribution and habitat ==
The masked finfoot can be found in a range of habitats across the eastern Indian subcontinent through to Malaysia and Indonesia in a variety of fresh to brackish wetlands, although due to habitat destruction it has disappeared from most of this range. This range includes forest, wooded savannah, flooded forest, and even mangrove swamps.

The finfoot feeds on aquatic invertebrates, including both adults and larval mayflies, dragonflies, crustaceans, also snails, fish and amphibians. They are thought to be highly opportunistic and take some of their prey directly off the waters surface. They are adept out of water and will forage on the banks as well, unlike the grebes, which they resemble but are not related to.

Finfoots are only seen singly or in pairs. They are very secretive. Because they are so elusive, it is not known if they spend most of their time in the water, where they are almost always seen, or on land.

The breeding biology is poorly known. It is thought to coincide with the rainy season. In Bangladesh, the breeding season was observed to extend from June to September. They build a pad-shaped nest of small sticks low above water. The nests are occasionally seen to have few long leaves, grass and reeds. Three to seven eggs are laid. The chicks are dark grey in colour with a white spot on the tip of the beak. The chicks are fed with fish and shrimps. The chicks leave the nest shortly after hatching.

== Status and conservation ==
The masked finfoot was formerly considered endangered and declining with fragmented populations and fewer than 600–1,700 individuals in 2009, but a 2020 study in Forktail found the population to likely be between 100 and 300, far lower than the previous estimate. This likely indicates that the species should be updated to critically endangered on the IUCN Red List, and major steps towards its protection have to be taken to avoid it becoming Asia's next avian extinction. Definitive breeding populations are only known from 4 sites in Bangladesh and Cambodia, with potential breeding populations at six possible sites in Myanmar, Laos, and Vietnam; the species has likely been extirpated from Thailand, Malaysia, Indonesia, and Singapore. Major threats to the species are human disturbance and habitat loss in the low-lying forested wetlands that it inhabits. The bird is protected in Malaysia.
