= Raaj =

Raaj may refer to:

- Romit Raj, an Indian actor
- Raaj the Showman, a 2009 Kannada film
- Raaj (film), a 2011 Telugu film

== See also ==
- Raj (disambiguation)
- Raaz (disambiguation)
