= Tirana Hassan =

Australian lawyer and social worker

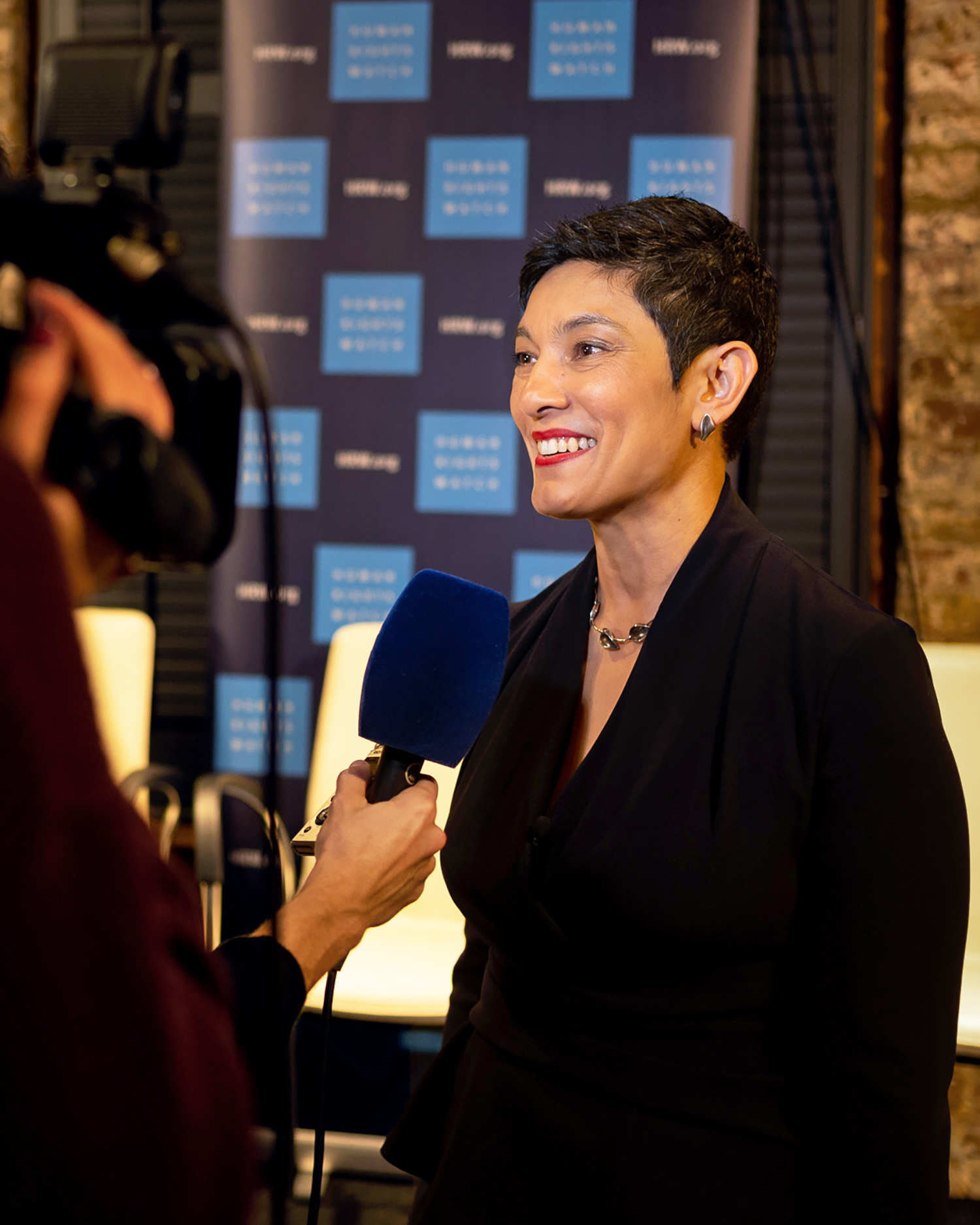
- Born: Singapore
- Citizenship: Australian
- Education: University of South Australia (BA); University of Adelaide (LLB); University of Oxford (MSt)
- Occupations: Social worker, human rights, humanitarian
- Employer(s): Human Rights Watch, Amnesty International, UNICEF, Save the Children
- Organization: Woomera Lawyers Group
- Relatives: Riaz Hassan

Tirana Hassan is an Australian lawyer and social worker. She spent decades working in humanitarian aid and leading human rights investigations. She served as Amnesty International's crisis response director and later as the executive director of Human Rights Watch.

On September 12, 2025, it was announced that Hassan would be the new chief executive officer of the international humanitarian organization Médecins Sans Frontières USA.

== Early life and education ==
Hassan was born in Singapore to a Pakistani father Riaz Hassan, an Australian sociologist, and a Malaysian-born Sri Lankan and Chinese mother Selva Arulamapalam, a dentist. Her childhood was spent in Singapore, Indonesia, the United States, and Australia. She attended high school at Scotch College in Australia and holds bachelor's degrees with honours in social work from the University of South Australia, and law from the University of Adelaide. In 2008, she received a master's degree in human rights law from Oxford University.

== Early career ==
Hassan was a social worker in Los Angeles, California; London, United Kingdom; and Adelaide, Australia. As a social worker, she worked with young people at risk of homelessness, before returning to study law. While in her final year of law school, Hassan co-founded the Woomera Lawyers Group, a refugee advocacy organization that provided legal services to asylum seekers detained in Australia. She was based part-time at the Woomera Detention Centre.

== Humanitarian career ==
From 2003 to 2010, Hassan worked in humanitarian aid operations as a protection specialist focusing on children in armed conflict, sexual and gender-based violence programs, and humanitarian protection across Asia and Africa. She has worked with Médecins Sans Frontières (MSF), UNICEF, and was Save the Children's child protection program director for West Africa.

From 2010 to 2015, Hassan was a senior researcher in Human Rights Watch's (HRW) Emergencies Division, responsible for human rights investigations in the Middle East, Asia, and Africa. In 2011, while conducting a research mission in Indonesia, Hassan was detained with fellow HRW researcher Andreas Harsono while investigating persecution and violence in the East Java region. As a researcher, Hassan published reports on violence against women in Côte d'Ivoire and Somalia, uprisings in Egypt in Bahrain, the Red Shirts political movement in Thailand, armed conflict in Libya, Sudan and South Sudan, child recruitment and attacks on schools in Somalia, sectarian violence in Burma and armed conflict in Iraq. Hassan has been HRW's deputy executive director and chief programs officer, where she oversaw the organization's research, legal and policy, communications, and advocacy departments.

From 2015 to 2020, Hassan was director of Amnesty International’s crisis response program, leading teams of investigators and building the organization's capacity in innovative research methodology, including using digital verification research methods for evidence collection in partnerships. During her time at Amnesty, Hassan worked on crises in Yemen, Syria, Sudan and European refugee issues. She covered the 2015 Rohingya refugee crisis, when tens of thousands of Rohingya people were forcibly displaced from their villages and IDP camps in Rakhine State, Myanmar by the Myanmar security forces.

In August 2022, Hassan became the acting executive director for Human Rights Watch after Kenneth Roth retired from the role. She left the organisation in February 2025.
