= Raška (surname) =

Family name

Raška (feminine: Rašková) is a Czech surname. There are several theories as to how it might have originated: from the name Raš, which originated as an abbreviation of names beginning with Ra- (Radek, Radim, etc.); from the German adjective rasch ('quick', 'swift'); from the word raška, formerly colloquially used for the birds whinchat, robin and redstart; from the word raška, i.e. 'old woman' dialectically; or from Raschau in Saxony. Notable people with the surname include:

- Adam Raška (ice hockey, born 1994), Czech ice hockey player
- Adam Raška (ice hockey, born 2001), Czech ice hockey player
- Jiří Raška (1941–2012), Czech ski jumper
- Karel Raška (1909–1987), Czech medical doctor and epidemiologist
- Martin Raška (born 1977), Czech footballer

== See also ==
- Raška (disambiguation)
- Chris Raschka (born 1959), Austrian-American illustrator, writer and violist
