= Fulica =

Fulica may refer to

- Fulica (bird), waterbirds commonly known as coots
- Fulica chloropus and Fulica fusca, related waterbirds commonly known as common moorhens
- Heliornis fulica, an unrelated species commonly known as the sungrebe
