= Raas =

Raas, RaaS or RAAS may refer to:

== Places ==
- Raas, a village in Natz-Schabs, Italy
- Raas Island, Indonesia
- Región Autónoma del Atlántico Sur (now South Caribbean Coast Autonomous Region), Nicaragua

== Science and technology ==
- Ransomware as a service, in cybercrime
- Recovery as a service, in cloud computing
- Renin–angiotensin–aldosterone system, a hormone system that regulates blood pressure
- Robot as a service
- Runway Awareness and Advisory System, an avionics system

== Other uses ==
- Raas (surname)
- Raas, breed of domestic cat
- Dandiya Raas, a folk dance from the Indian state of Gujarat, often associated with Garba
- Raas leela, a traditional Indian dance
- RAAS Racial Adjustment Action Society, a UK Black Power movement

== See also ==
- Rasa (disambiguation)
- Raaz (disambiguation)
