= Adam Raška =

Adam Raška may refer to:

- Adam Raška (ice hockey, born 1994), Czech forward
- Adam Raška (ice hockey, born 2001), Czech winger
