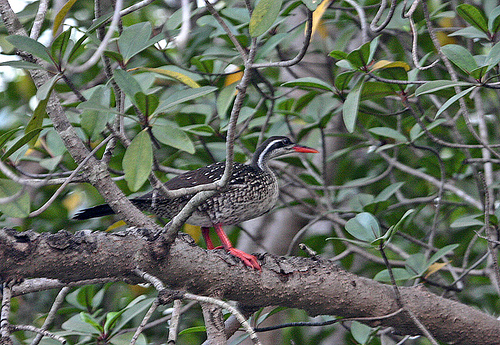

Conservation status
- Least Concern (IUCN 3.1)

Scientific classification
- Kingdom: Animalia
- Phylum: Chordata
- Class: Aves
- Order: Gruiformes
- Family: Heliornithidae
- Genus: Podica; Lesson, 1831
- Species: P. senegalensis

Binomial name
- Podica senegalensis (Vieillot, 1817)

Synonyms
- Heliornis senegalensis Vieillot, 1817

= African finfoot =

Species of bird

The African finfoot or Peter's finfoot (Podica senegalensis) is an aquatic bird from the family Heliornithidae (the finfoots and sungrebe). The species lives in the rivers and lakes of western, central, and southern Africa.

== Description ==
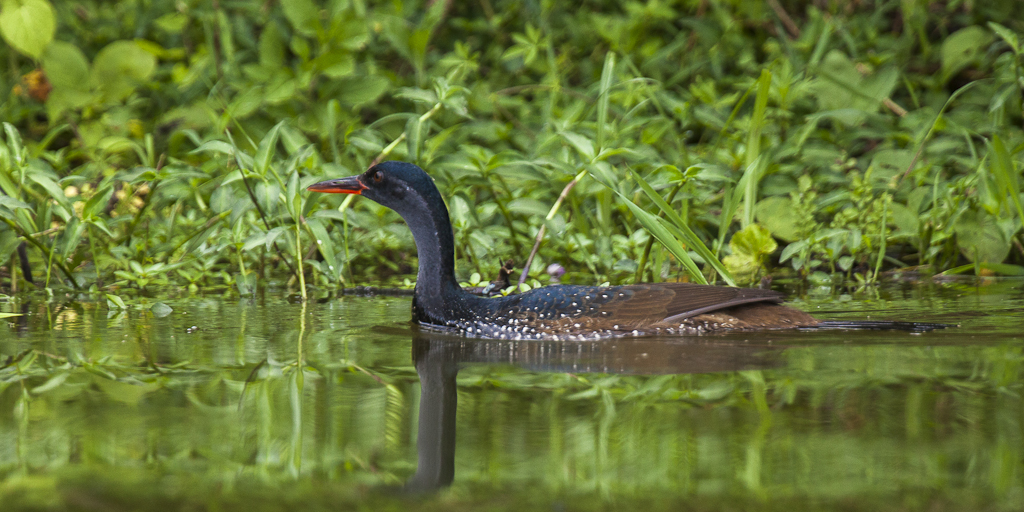
subspecies camerunensis, lake Mburo, Uganda

The African finfoot is an underwater specialist with a long neck, a striking sharp beak, and bright red, lobed feet. The plumage varies by race, generally pale underneath and darker on top. The males are usually darker than the females.

== Habits and range ==
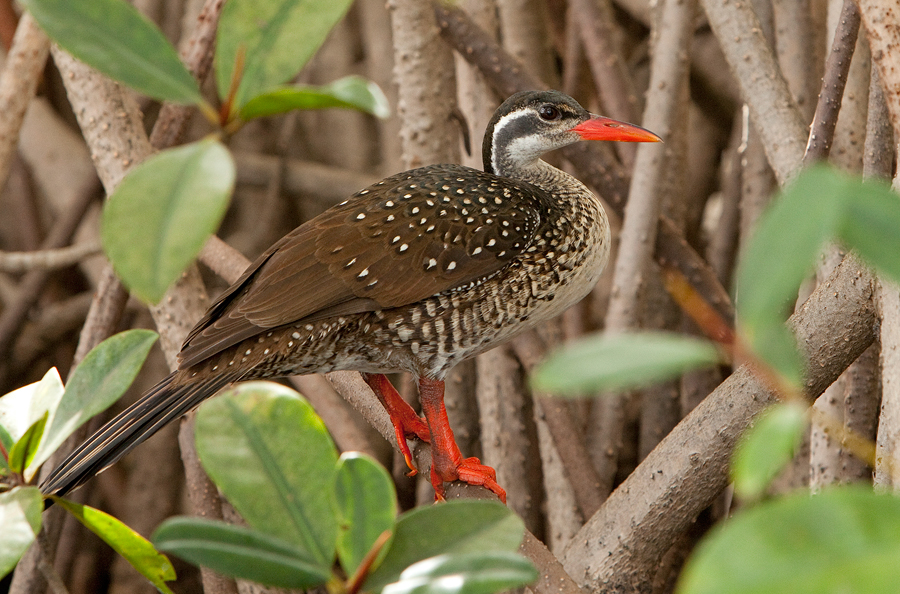
Male

The African finfoot can be found in a range of habitats across Africa, in areas where there are rivers, streams, and lakes with good cover on the banks. This range includes forest, wooded savannah, flooded forest, and even mangrove swamps.

The finfoot feeds on aquatic invertebrates, including both adults and larval mayflies, dragonflies, crustaceans, also snails, fish and amphibians. They are thought to be highly opportunistic and take some of their prey directly off the waters surface. They are adept out of water and will forage on the banks as well, unlike the grebes, which they resemble but are not related to.

Finfoots are usually seen singly or in pairs. They are very secretive. Even experienced ornithologists see them very rarely, making them a prized sighting for birders and twitchers. Because they are so elusive, it is not known if they spend most of their time in the water, where they are almost always seen, or on land.

Their time of breeding varies by area, usually coinciding with the rainy season. They build a nest, nothing more than a mess of twigs and reeds, on a fallen tree above the water. Two eggs are laid and incubated solely by the female. The chicks leave the nest a few days after hatching.

== Relationships ==
The African finfoot belongs to a family, Heliornithidae, whose only other members are the masked finfoot and the sungrebe. Their relationships between this family and other birds are poorly understood.

== Status and conservation ==
The African finfoot's conservation status is hard to determine, given its elusive nature. It is not considered threatened, as it is not persecuted or targeted by hunters, and while scarce, it is very widespread. However, there is concern that it may become threatened, as wetlands are cleared and watercourses altered and polluted. It is also thought to tolerate only minimal disturbance. This and increased habitat fragmentation mean that the species needs to be monitored to safeguard it. There are currently no African finfoots in captivity.
