= Raas Island =

Island in Indonesia

Palau Ra'as
- Interactive map of Raas Island

Geography
- Location: South East Asia
- Coordinates: 7.1225°S 114.5400°E
- Area: 32.8433 km^{2} (12.6809 sq mi)
- Highest elevation: 9 m (30 ft)

Administration
- Indonesia
- Administered under the Sumenep Regency

Demographics
- Population: 28,424

Raas is an Indonesian island located to the east of the larger island of Madura, East Java. The island acts as the administrative capital of the Raas district, which includes several surrounding islands.

The Raas cat is a breed of domestic cat, selectively bred from the landrace originating from the island.

== See also ==
- Raas (disambiguation)
