= Rahasyam =

Rahasyam or rahasiyam (lit. 'secret' or 'mystery' in Sanskrit) may refer to:

- Chidambara Rahasiyam (disambiguation), a Hindu myth and related media
- Rahasyam (1967 film), a 1967 Indian Telugu-language film
- Rahasyam (1969 film), a 1969 Indian Malayalam-language film

== See also ==
- Raaz (disambiguation)
- Rahasya, 2015 Indian film
- Ragasya, an Indian actress
