= Chidambaram (disambiguation) =

Chidambaram is a city in southeast India. Chidambaram may also refer to:

== People ==
- C. T. Chidambaram, Indian politician
- M. A. Chidambaram, Indian industrialist and cricket administrator
- M. Ct. M. Chidambaram Chettyar, founder of the Indian Overseas Bank
- P. Chidambaram, Indian politician and former Finance Minister of India
- Rajagopala Chidambaram, nuclear physicist
- Sakthi Chidambaram, Tamil film director
- Chidambaram S. Poduval, Malayalam film director
- Chidambaram Subramaniam, Indian statesman

== Places ==
- Chidambaram division, a revenue division in the Cuddalore district of Tamil Nadu, India
- Chidambaram taluk, an administrative division of the Cuddalore district in India
- Erode V.O.Chidambaram Park Stadium, a football stadium in Tamil Nadu, India
- M. A. Chidambaram Stadium, a cricket stadium in Chennai, India
- Nataraja Temple, Chidambaram or Chidambaram temple, a Hindu temple in Chidambaram

== Other uses ==
- Chidambaram (film), a 1985 Malayalam film written, directed and produced by G. Aravindan
- Chidambara Rahasiyam (disambiguation), Hindu folklore in India
