= Chidambara Rahasiyam (disambiguation) =

Chidambara Rahasiyam is a Hindu religious belief associated with Chidambram, India.

Chidambara Rahasiyam may also refer to:

- Chidambara Rahasiyam (film), a 1986 Indian Tamil-language film
- Chidambara Rahasiyam (TV series), a 2004 Indian television series
- Chidambara Rahasya, a 1985 Kannada-language book by Indian writer Poornachandra Tejaswi

== See also ==
- Chidambara (disambiguation)
- Rahasyam (disambiguation)
