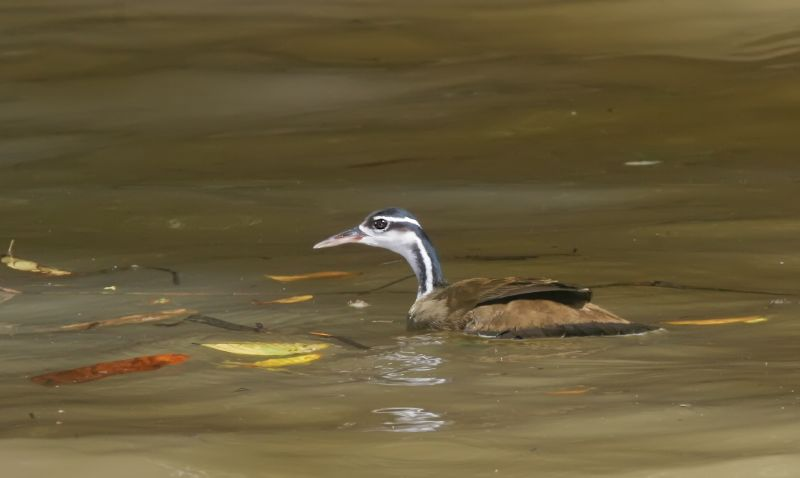

Conservation status
- Least Concern (IUCN 3.1)

Scientific classification
- Kingdom: Animalia
- Phylum: Chordata
- Class: Aves
- Order: Gruiformes
- Family: Heliornithidae
- Genus: Heliornis; Bonnaterre, 1791
- Species: H. fulica

Binomial name
- Heliornis fulica (Boddaert, 1783)
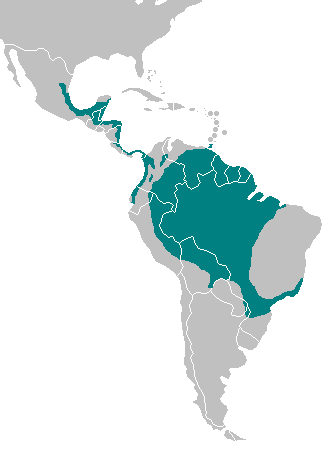
- Range map

= Sungrebe =

Sungrebe Temporal range: Middle Miocene to present

Species of bird

The sungrebe or American finfoot (Heliornis fulica) is a small aquatic gruiform found in the tropical and subtropical Americas from northeastern Mexico to central Ecuador and southern Brazil.

The sungrebe is now the only species placed in the genus Heliornis that was erected by the French naturalist Pierre Bonnaterre in 1791 with the sungrebe as the type species. The name of the genus combines the Ancient Greek hēlios meaning "sun" and ornis meaning "bird". The specific epithet fulica is Latin for "coot".

These waterfowl have broad lobes on their feet, convergent to that of grebes or coots, that they use to propel themselves in the water. They are reclusive birds, preferring well-covered slow-flowing streams and secluded waterways, sometimes swimming partly submerged, like an anhinga.

Sungrebes are unique among birds in that males have "pouches", folds of skin under their wings in which they carry their young from hatching until the chicks are able to swim for themselves. This has led to them being called "Marsupial Birds"; certain feathers, with their own musculature, serve as "guard rails" to prevent the baby from falling out.

== Description ==
Sungrebes, when perching or on land, show boldly banded yellow and black legs and lobed feet. The body plumage is mostly varying shades of reddish brown. The head and neck are strikingly patterned with a black crown and nape and white stripes along the sides of its neck, as well as a white throat and chin. The long tail (almost a third of the total length) extends well beyond the body in flight, and sits fanned out on or just below the surface of the water while the bird swims.

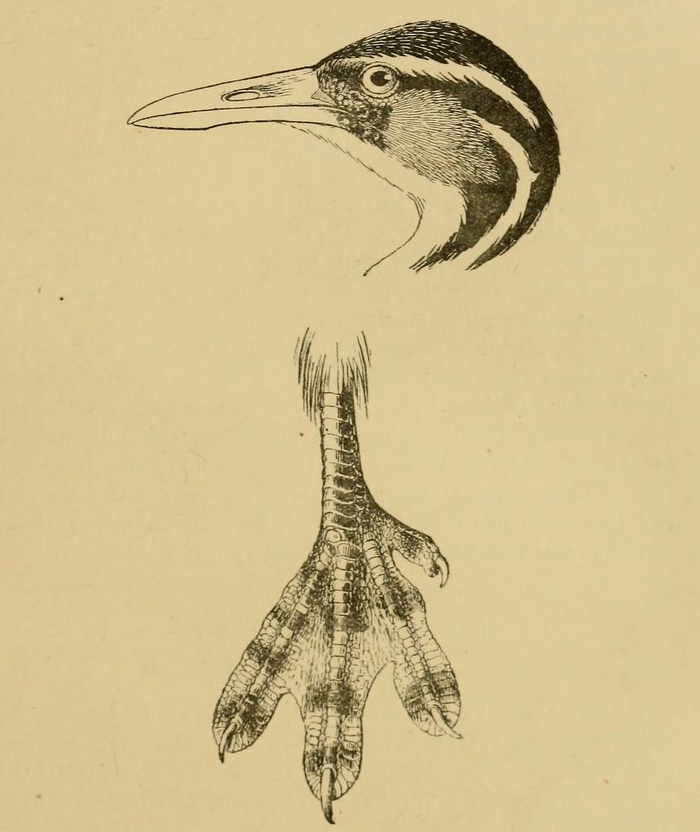
Illustration of the head and lobate foot of a sungrebe, detailing their bold patterning

Sungrebes are sexually dimorphic. The female is more brightly colored and, on average, slightly smaller but more powerfully built than the male. Females have a rufous patch on the side of the face that brightens to a cinnamon-orange color during the breeding season. During the breeding season, her eye ring becomes brighter in color and her lower mandible goes from dark red to bright scarlet.

Females tend to have a body length of 27 cm (11 in), a wing length of 13.77 cm (5.42 in), and an average mass of 130–140 g (4.6–4.9 oz).

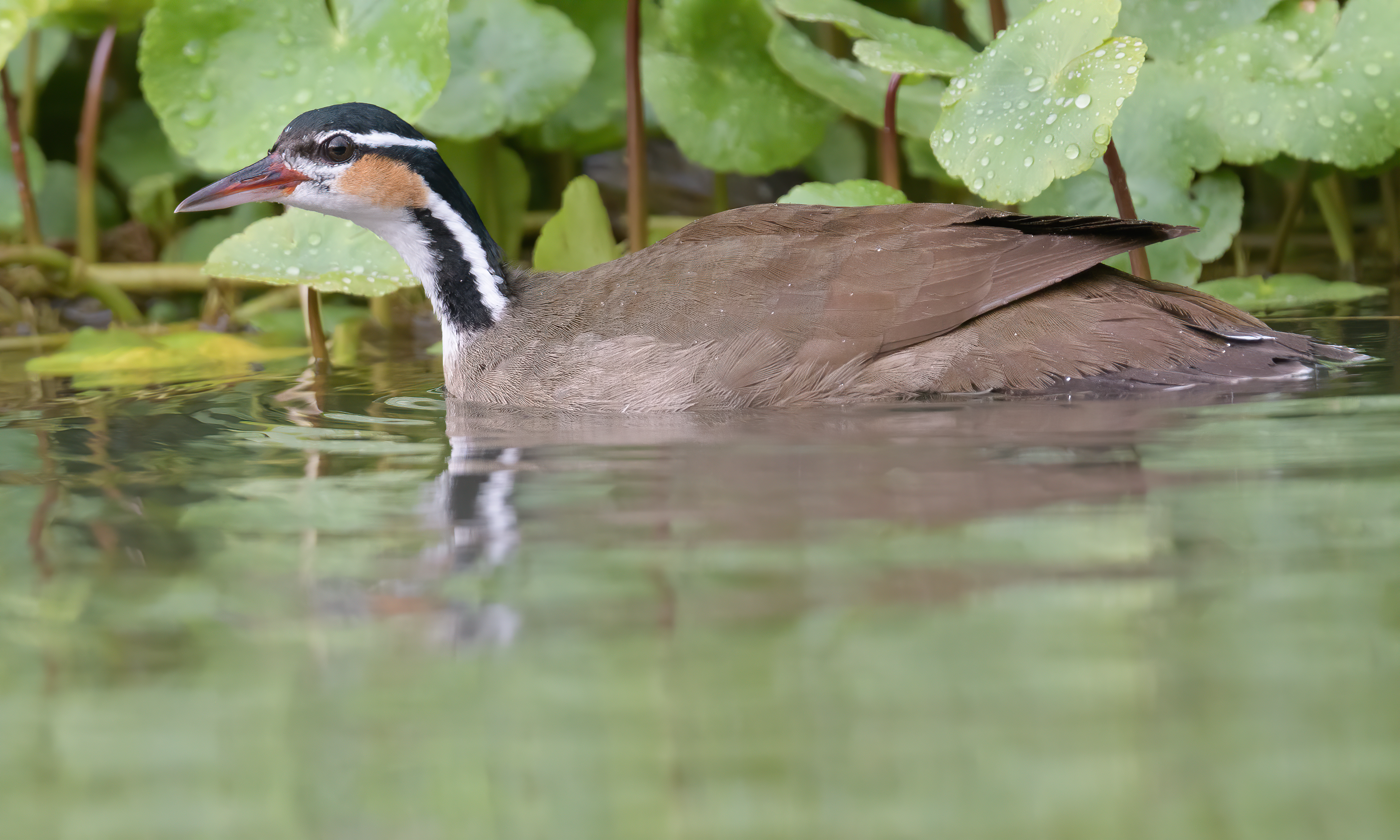
Breeding female in Tortuguero, Costa Rica

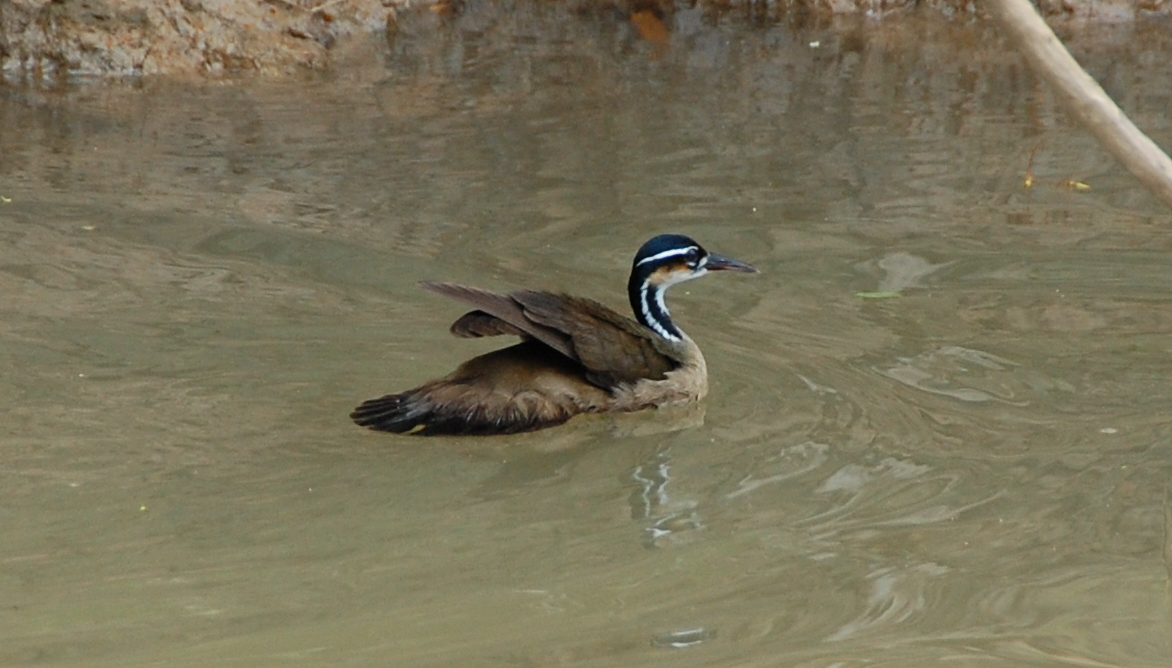
Female in nonbreeding plumage. Contrast with the males shown below; in particular note the small chestnut cheek patches that remain visible.

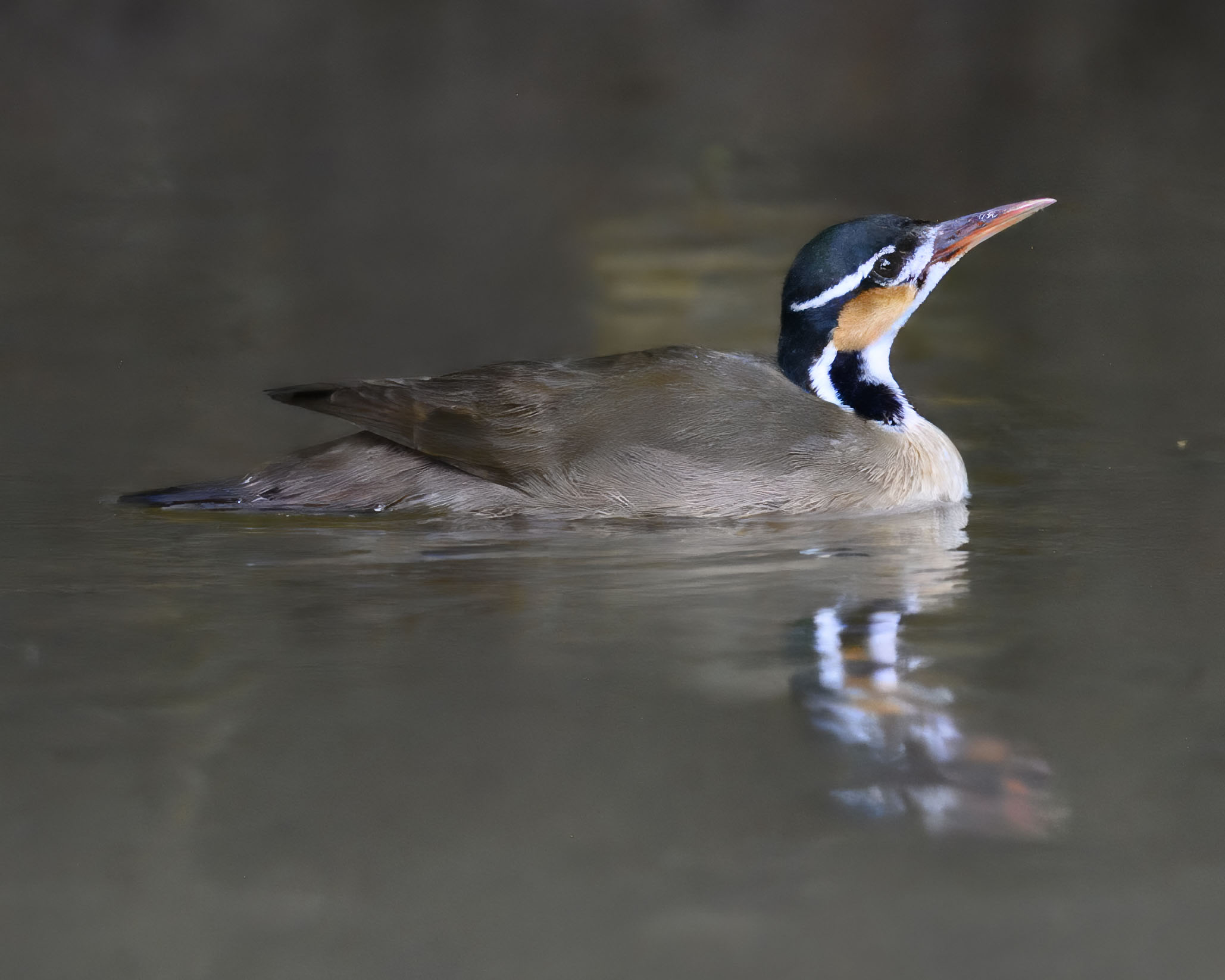
Breeding female in Caño Negro, Costa Rica, showing the iridescence of her dark head markings

Males are similar to females, but with slightly drabber plumage; in particular the male lacks the bright eye ring and orange-rufous cheek patches that the female displays, and while his lower mandible turns from pale beige to dark red during the breeding season, it does not get as bright as that of the female.

On average males tend toward a body length of 30 cm (12 in), a wing length of 14.1 cm (5.6 in), and an average mass (110-140g).

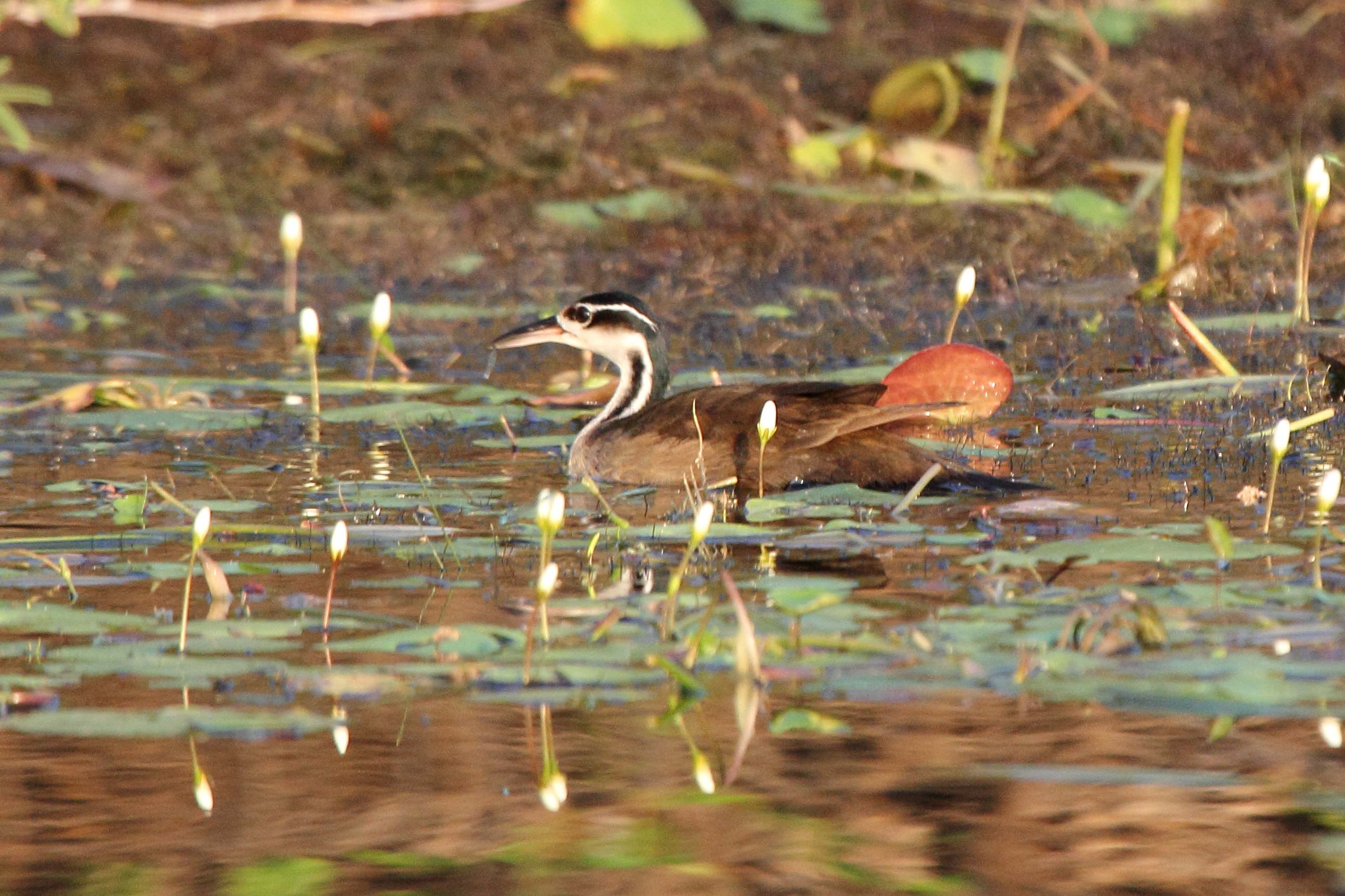
Male in breeding plumage foraging amidst Nymphoides in Blue Hole National Park, Belize. Note the duller red bill, and the lack of a cheek-patch compared to a breeding female.

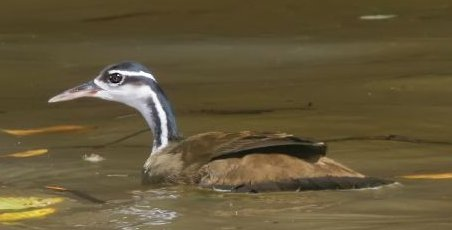
Male. Note that his bill has turned beige-white out of breeding season

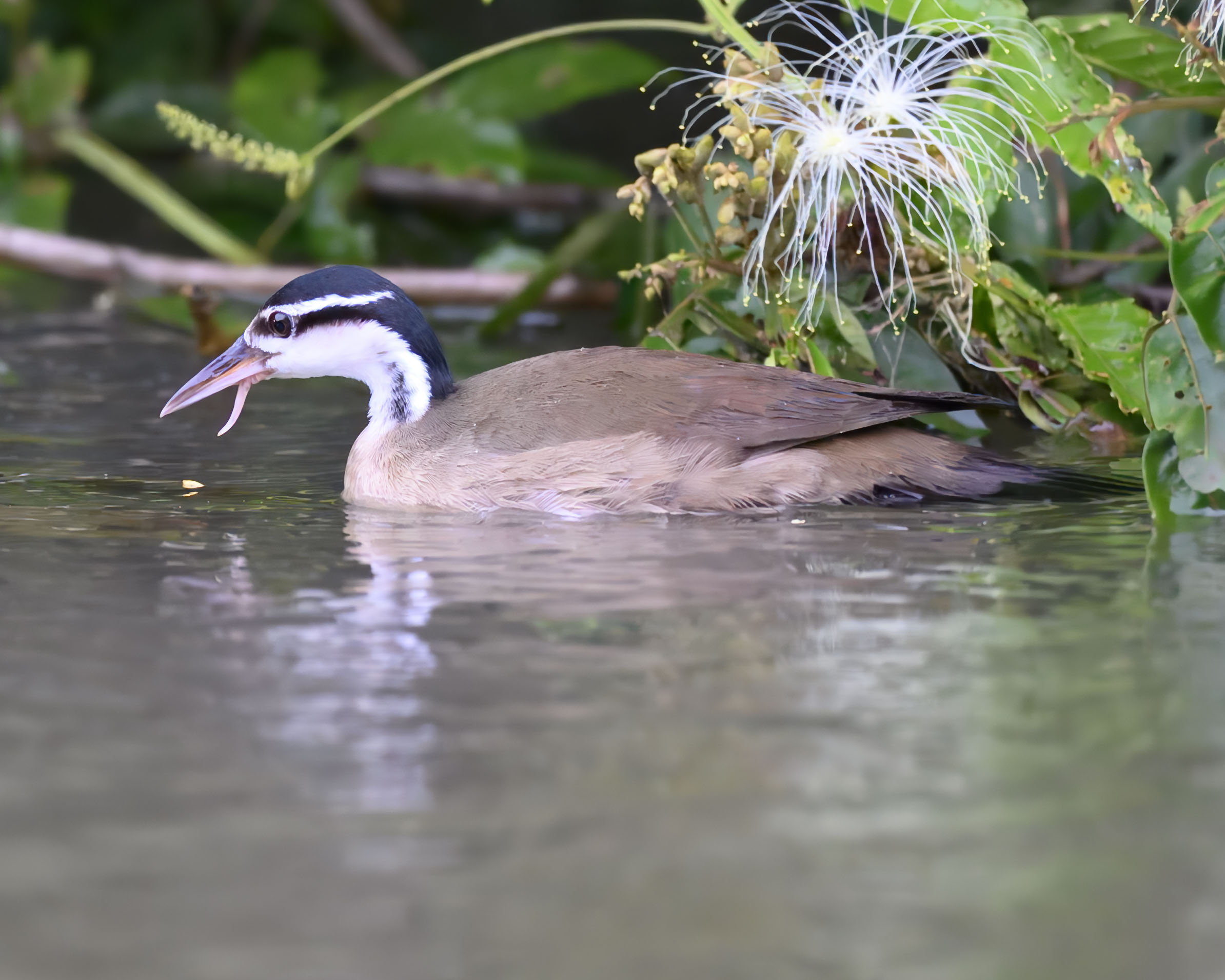
Male sungrebe at Caño Negro Wildlife Refuge, with an injury that has caused a herniated tongue.

Juveniles have similar plumage to the male, but are slightly smaller, and with a grayer cast to the body feathers and more white on the cheeks and neck.

Chicks, once they graduate from their father's pouch and can move independently, are covered with fuzzy down that is countershaded slate-gray with a white belly and throat. The bill is slate-gray with a pale yellow tip.

== Distribution and habitat ==
Sungrebes are found in heavily vegetated, mostly freshwater wetland environments, from northeast Mexico south along the Gulf and Caribbean coasts through Panama, where they live throughout the Canal Zone and Darien, and then along the Pacific coast from Panama through central Ecuador. They are also found throughout the Orinoco and Amazon Watershed, the Pantanal, and the Brazilian Atlantic Rainforests. Aside from Trinidad and Tobago, they are not found in the insular Caribbean, and seem to have difficulty dispersing over long distances of saltwater. Though occasionally recorded at higher elevations, the sungrebe is usually associated with lowlands from sea level to around 500 meters. They are residents throughout their range; they do not seem to migrate.

Sungrebes seem to be expanding the northern limit of their range in northeastern Mexico. They were historically found no farther north than central Veracruz, but by the 1940s had established populations throughout Veracruz and into San Luis Potosí. They are now expanding their range further north in Tamaulipas, and an individual was sighted on 13 November 2008 on the Marsh Loop at Bosque del Apache National Wildlife Refuge in New Mexico, USA, the first historical record of sungrebes in the United States.

== Taxonomy ==
The sungrebe was described by the French polymath Georges-Louis Leclerc, Comte de Buffon in 1781 in his Histoire Naturelle des Oiseaux from a specimen collected in Cayenne, French Guiana. The bird was also illustrated in a hand-coloured plate engraved by François-Nicolas Martinet in the Planches Enluminées D'Histoire Naturelle which was produced under the supervision of Edme-Louis Daubenton to accompany Buffon's text. Neither the plate caption nor Buffon's description included a scientific name but in 1783 the Dutch naturalist Pieter Boddaert coined the binomial name Colymbus fulica in his catalogue of the Planches Enluminées. No subspecies are recognised.

The sungrebe is the only living member of the genus Heliornis. The family Heliornithidae, to which it belongs, contains just two other species: the African finfoot, Podica senegalensis, found in the Afrotropics from Sub-saharan West Africa and the Congo Basin through the Great Lakes' western shores to Southeast Africa, and the Asian or masked finfoot Heliopais personatus, found from eastern Indomalaya down through Sundaland to the Wallace Line.

Heliornis molecular samples have played a key role in the contentious placement of Heliornithidae within Gruiformes. The Sibley–Ahlquist taxonomy of birds, based on DNA-DNA Hybridization, suggested that they are sister taxa to limpkins, the Aramidae, and even placed the limpkins within Heliornithidae in 1990. However, more recent genetic and osteological analyses suggests that limpkins are sister taxa to cranes, the Gruidae, and that finfeet are instead sister taxa to rails, the Rallidae. Further studies add that finfeet separated from the common ancestors of Flufftails, Cave Rails, and Adzebills at the end of the Eocene, probably in Africa, together forming a sister clade to Rallidae.

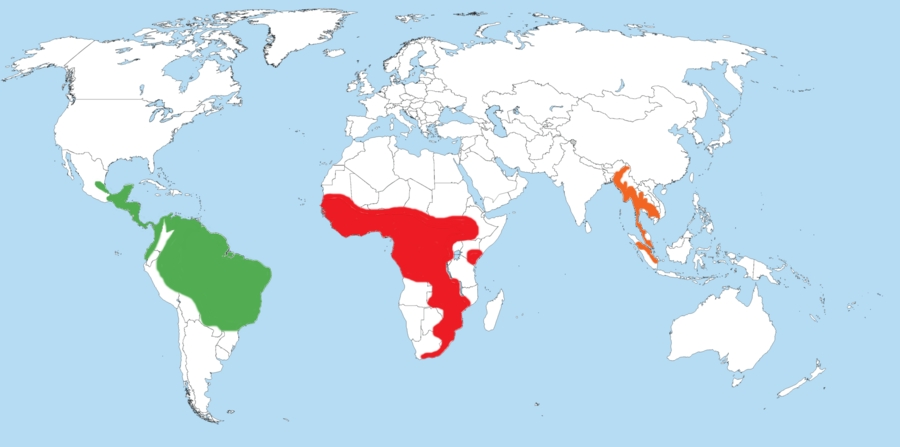
Historical distribution of the three extant Heliornithids. Heliornis fulica in green.

Within Heliornithidae, sungrebes are sister to the Asian finfoot, rather than the geographically closer African finfoot, according to the results of both mitochondrial and nuclear DNA sequencing.

=== Fossil record ===
The genus Heliornis appears to have had a wider distribution in the past; a 14 million year-old fossil humerus attributed to Heliornis aff. fulica has been described from the Middle Miocene-aged Pungo River Formation of North Carolina, USA. This is the earliest known finfoot fossil, and suggests that the ancestors of sungrebes were present in North America well before the Great American Interchange, when the Isthmus of Panama formed.

The further discovery of Miocene fossils of Heliopais in the Sahel suggests that finfeet have an African origin. The ancestor of Heliornis would then have migrated across Beringia and through North America to reach South America, rather than clade that evolved in Gondwana diverging by continental drift and then moving north into Laurasia. This would also explain the absence of finfeet from Australia, and the success of the sungrebe at colonizing the continental Neotropics while failing to colonize the Antilles.

== Behaviour and ecology ==
=== Vocalizations ===
Sungrebes use a series of 4-7 descending hoots as an advertising call before and after territorial encounters. During interactions they produce a yodeling quack similar to grebes and some diving ducks. They use a series of shorter, sharper barks and clicks when moving away from a threat. Sungrebes cluck quietly to each other during courtship displays and while taking turns incubating eggs on the nest.

=== Breeding ===
The sungrebe has a mating season that begins in the middle of April during the "early wet season"; breeding is correlated with rainfall and corresponding high water levels that flood habitat and bring the sort of low-overhanging vegetation that subgrebes like to build their nest in. The bolder coloration and greater mass of the females, the males' role as primary caregiver for the young, suggest that females court the males, although this has not yet been observed. Both the male and female birds take part in the nest building, which typically consists of twigs, reeds, and dried leaves. The nest is a flimsy platform placed about a meter above the water's surface.

There are usually two to four eggs in a clutch. They are round in shape with a buffy white to pale cinnamon base color, with irregularly-shaped dark cinnamon, ruddy brown, and pale purple sports scattered uniformly over the surface at variable densities from egg to egg. The eggs hatch after an unusually short incubation period of only 10 to 11 days. Both sexes share responsibility in the incubation of the eggs; the female sits on the nest for most of the daylight hours and throughout the night, while male incubates them during the middle part of the day. Unlike their close relatives, the African and Asian finfoot, whose chicks are said to be precocial, sungrebe chicks are altricial upon hatching, blind and defenseless with only sparse down and poorly matured feet and bill.

Males transfer the young to their pouches soon after hatching and keep them there, feeding them and cleaning out their waste, until they are able to swim and feed independently. For some period of time after this, the chicks continue to follow their father and perhaps their mother, often riding on their back. It is unknown how involved mothers are in the care of their young after hatching.

==== Pouch ====
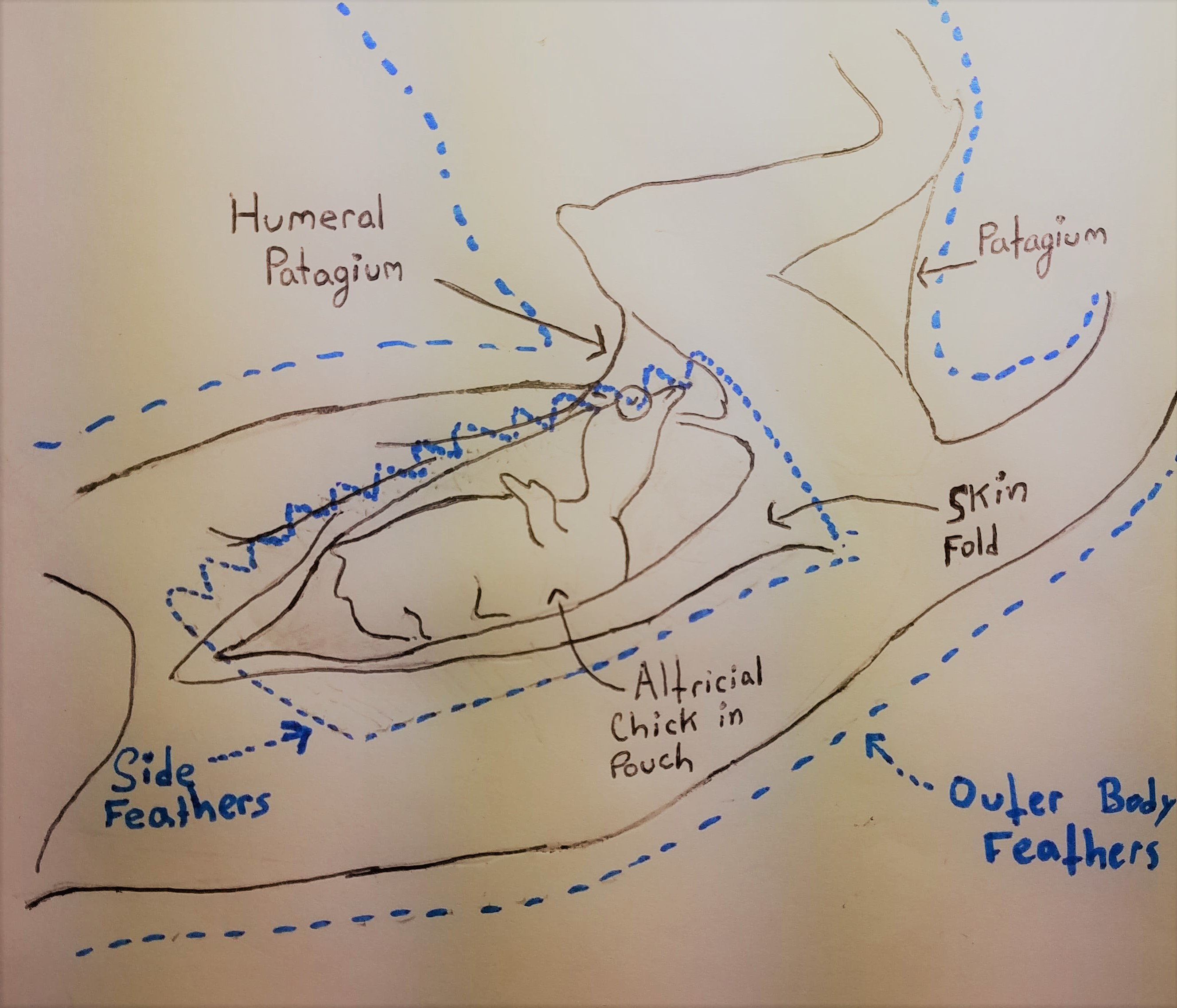
Diagram of chick inside pouch; dotted lines show feather wall that holds chick in pouch

The pouch of a male sungrebe is a shallow, ovular pocket formed by pleats of well-muscled skin that extend along the side of the chest under the wings, further buffered by a wall of long, curved feathers growing upwards and backwards from the lower part of the side of the chest. These feathers hold chicks in place during movement, even allowing a male to carry them while diving and flying. The bird appears to have some muscular control over the shape of the pleats, and can restrict or enhance fluid flow into the tissue to make them more or less rigid. Each pouch can hold one or two chicks.

It is unknown whether other finfoots share this trait, as it does not persist in prepared skins and would be difficult to spot even in fresh specimens unless one knew to seek it out.

Reproductive pouches are otherwise unknown in birds, so it is difficult to say how this evolved. However, in jacanas, a tropical wading bird found in the same habitat as finfeet, the males also provide most of the parental care and young are frequently sheltered and even carried by tucking them under the wings and holding them against the body. This suggests a possible ancestral relationship with sungrebes.

=== Food and feeding ===
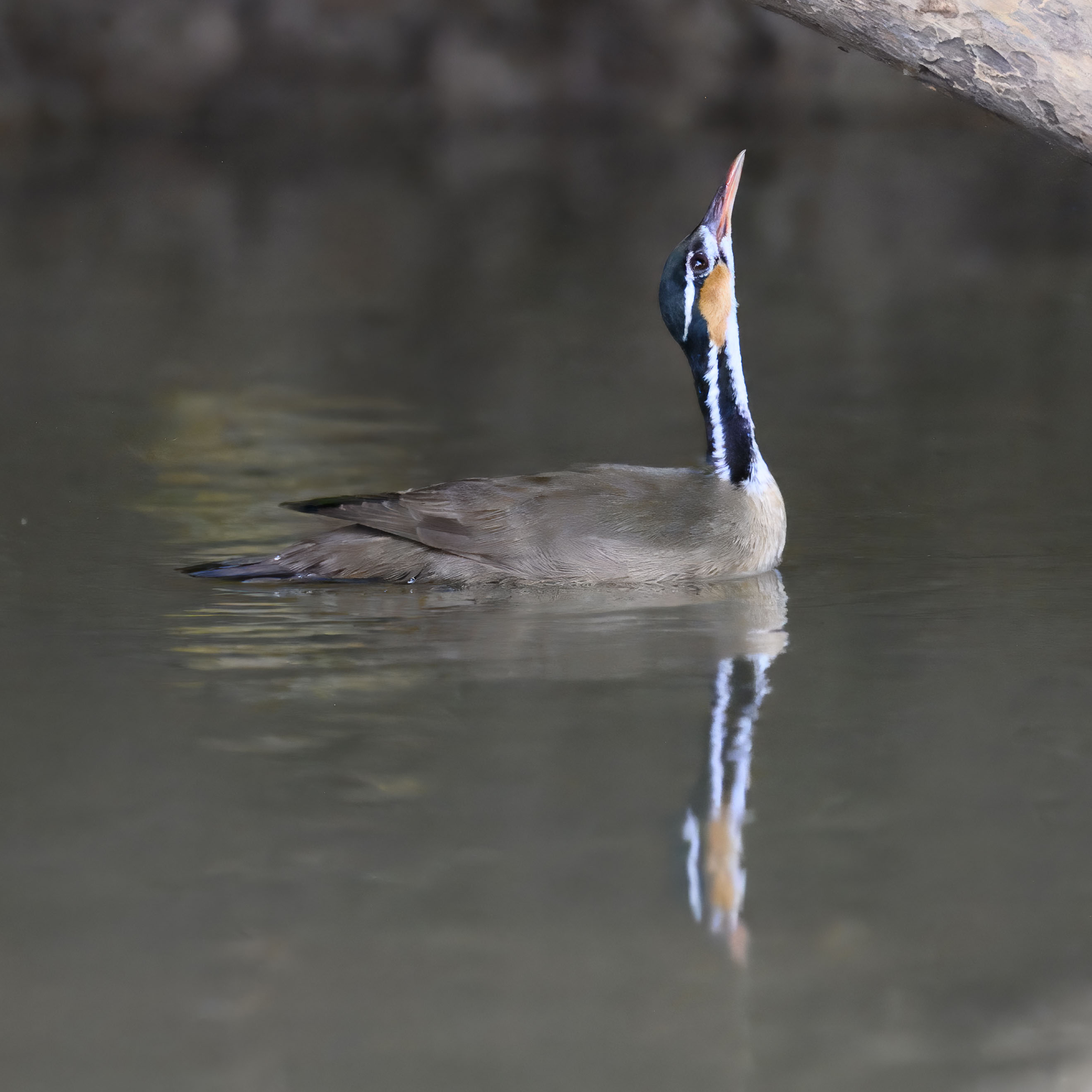
Foraging in Caño Negro Wildlife Refuge, Costa Rica.

Sungrebes prefer quiet forest streams and rivers, freshwater ponds, and lakes with thick, overhanging vegetation. Here, they hunt snails and a variety of terrestrial and aquatic arthropods, as well as small fish, frogs and lizards. They will also eat some plant matter, including seeds and fruit. Most hunting and foraging takes place on or just above the surface of the water, although they may make short dives after fish and frogs, or hunt from low perches over the water.

Sungrebes live at variable, but generally low population densities, and are generally solitary or found in pairs. They do not migrate seasonally, except to move out of drying habitats and into flooding ones within their range. It is not known how far juvenile sungrebes disperse after fledging, nor is it known if one sex preferentially disperses. It might be notable, however, that erratic sungrebes found outside of their known range have tended to be females.

There is also no information on life span, age at first breeding, or mortality rates of the young.

== Conservation status ==
Given that their range is very large and that the species is not directly targeted for human use, BirdLife International (2009) and the IUNC evaluates the conservation status of the sungrebe as of Least Concern. Their northward expansion seems to justify that status. However, very little is known about any population of sungrebe, including the nature of their risk factors and whether the range of the sungrebe consists of a single large population at low risk or a series of genetically distinct populations at higher risk. Further, tropical wetland areas are attractive targets for agricultural usage and hydroelectric projects. The sungrebe's preference for heavy cover and tendency to avoid the presence of humans may limit its ability to cope with the rapid urbanization of Latin America. Nevertheless, sungrebes seem to be faring much better than their relatives, who live in much more population-dense, much less well protected or environmentally regulated parts of the world.

== Local Names ==
- English: Sungrebe, American Finfoot
- Spanish: Ipequí, Avesol Americano, Colimbo-selvático Americano, Pájaro Cantil, Pájaro del Sol, Patas Lobuladas, Pato Cantil, Zambullidor-Sol
- Portuguese: Ipequi, Pequi, Picaparra, Marrequinha-do-Igapó, Mergulhão, Patinho-de-Igapó, Ananai, Dom-dom
- Guarani: Ypeky
- Wayampi: Pẽkĩ
- Emerillon: Pẽki
- Makushi: Yawiwa
- Warao: Oranih
- Sranan: Watra-en
- Guianese Creole: Souroukou
- Karipúna Creole: Dondon
- French: Picpare, Grébifoulque d'Amérique, Grébifoulque de Cayenne
- Dutch: Kleine Fuutkoet
