= Three certified agreements case =

- Court: Australian Industrial Relations Commission
- Full case name: Re: Rural City of Murray Bridge Nursing Employees, ANF (Aged Care) – Enterprise Agreement 2004 (18 March 2005 PR956575).
- Decided: 21 March 2005
- Citation: PR956575

Case history
- Prior action: '
- Subsequent action: none

Court membership
- Judges sitting: Guidice, Lawler, Ross

Case opinions
- The case determined what did and did not pertain. It concluded: Trade union right of entry "pertains to the relationship between employer and employee".; Salary sacrifice "pertains to the relationship between employer and employee".; Setting conditions for employees of labour hire "pertains to the relationship between employer and employee".; Recognition of delegates "pertains to the relationship between employer and employee".; Payroll deductions for union dues "do not pertain to the relationship between employer and employee".; Trade union training leave "pertains to the relationship between employer and employee".

The three certified agreements case was a decision of the Australian Industrial Relations Commission that resolved the confusion created by the High Court's decision of Electrolux v AWU.

== Name ==
The three certified agreements case, or In Re Schefenacker, the Australian Nursing Federation and the Rural City of Murray Bridge, was a case that combined appeals from decisions of a single commissioner not to certify enterprise agreements, as it was believed that the agreements contained clauses that did not pertain to the relationship between employer and employee:

- The Murray Bridge Enterprise Bargaining Agreement
- The Schefenacker Vision Systems Enterprise Bargaining Agreement
- The La Trobe University Enterprise Bargaining Agreement

== Background ==
The decision was necessary to clarify the High Court of Australia's decision Electrolux v AWU, which caused much uncertainty existed on could be placed into enterprise bargaining agreements.

== Significance ==
The decision was handed down on 21 March 2005. The case got major attention around Australia. It was one of the longest-awaited decisions in industrial relations law, as industrial relations professionals had awaited clarification of Electrolux of the High Court of Australia for over five months.

It is commonly regarded as the final landmark decision of the Australian Industrial Relations Commission. (That is before its wage setting, award formation and agreement certification powers were removed from it by the WorkChoices reform in 2006.)

== Decision ==
The case dealt with whether a large number of union-friendly provisions such as these:

- union training leave
- the recognition of delegates
- right of entry
- salary sacrifice
- use of labour hire (and setting or terms of conditions for labour hire)

The case decided that the matters (in certain forms) could be included into enterprise agreements (and awards would have been followed). It was generally accepted as a major union victory.
