= Raska =

Raska may refer to:

- Raska Lukwiya (died 2006), third highest-ranking leader of the Lord's Resistance Army rebel group founded in northern Uganda
- Raška (disambiguation), spelling variant

== See also ==
- Rasca (disambiguation)
