= Raška =

Raška or Rascia may refer to:

== Geography ==
- Raška (region), a geographical and historical region in modern Serbia
- Raška (river), a river in Serbia
- Raška, Serbia, a town and municipality in Serbia

== History and administration ==
- Eparchy of Raška, a medieval diocese (eparchy) of the Serbian Orthodox Church
- Catepanate of Raška, variant designation for the Catepanate of Ras, a short lived Byzantine province (971–976) in central Serbian lands
- Grand Principality of Raška, variant designation for the Grand Principality of Serbia, in the 11th and 12th century
- Kingdom of Raška, variant designation for the medieval Kingdom of Serbia, in the 13th and 14th century
- Raška architectural style, architectural style in medieval Serbia, in the 12th and 13th century
- Despotate of Raška, variant designation for the Despotate of Serbia, in the 15th century
- Little Raška, a region inhabited by Serbs (Rascians) in southern regions of Pannonian plain, from the 16th to 18th century
- Raška Oblast, former administrative district in Kingdom of Serbs, Croats and Slovenes from 1922 to 1929
- Raška District, modern administrative district (okrug) in Serbia

== People ==
- Raška (surname), Czech surname

== See also ==
- Raska (disambiguation)
- Rassa (disambiguation)
