= Water bird =

Bird that lives on or around water

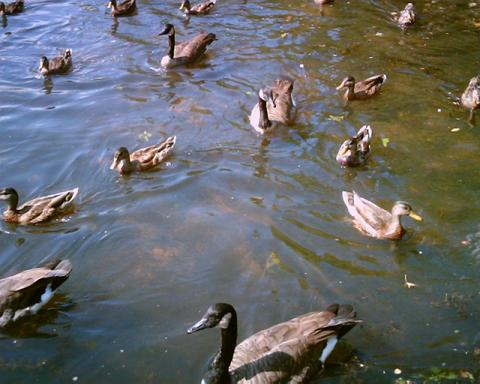
Geese and ducks are just two types of water birds, which include seabirds, shorebirds, waterfowl, and numerous other forms of birds.

Video of gulls, ducks, and swans feeding on the Danube River in Vienna (2014)

A water bird, alternatively waterbird or aquatic bird, is a bird that lives on or around water. In some definitions, the term water bird is especially applied to birds in freshwater ecosystems, although others make no distinction from seabirds that inhabit marine environments. Some water birds (e.g. wading birds) are more terrestrial while others (e.g. waterfowls) are more aquatic, and their adaptations will vary depending on their environment. These adaptations include webbed feet, beaks, and legs adapted to feed in the water, and the ability to dive from the surface or the air to catch prey in water.

The term aquatic bird is sometimes also used in this context. A related term that has a narrower meaning is waterfowl. Some piscivorous birds of prey, such as ospreys, sea eagles, fish eagles, fish owls, and fishing owls, hunt aquatic prey but do not stay in water for long and live predominantly over dry land, and are not considered water birds. The term waterbird is also used in the context of conservation to refer to any birds that inhabit or depend on bodies of water or wetland areas. Examples of this use include the Agreement on the Conservation of African-Eurasian Migratory Waterbirds (AEWA) and the Wallnau Waterbird Reserve.

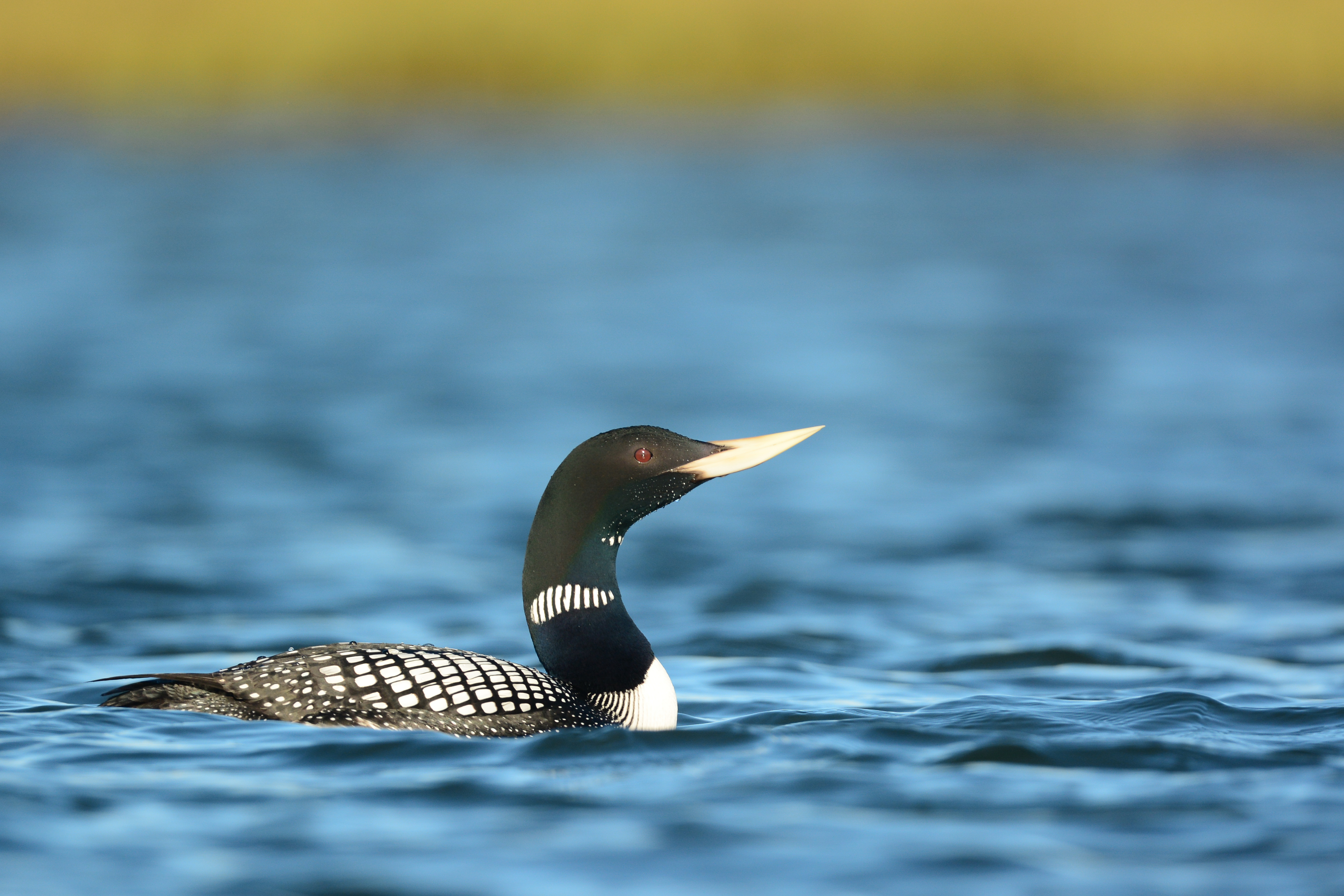
A yellow-billed loon, a diving bird in the order Gaviiformes, swimming on a lake in the northern area of Alaska, United States

== Types ==
Some examples of water birds are:

- Seabirds (marine birds)
  - Penguins (order Sphenisciformes)
  - Tropicbirds (order Phaethontiformes)
  - Albatrosses and petrels (order Procellariiformes)
  - Pelicans (family Pelecanidae within order Pelecaniformes)
  - Gannets, boobies, cormorants, and frigatebirds (families Sulidae, Phalacrocoracidae, and Fregatidae within order Suliformes)
  - Gulls, terns, skimmers, skuas, auks, and phalaropes (families Laridae, Stercorariidae, and Alcidae, plus genus Phalaropus, within order Charadriiformes)
- Herons, egrets, bitterns, ibises, spoonbills, shoebills, and hamerkops (the rest of order Pelecaniformes)
- Darters and anhingas (the rest of order Suliformes)
- Shorebirds and waders (the rest of order Charadriiformes)
- Ducks, geese, swans, magpie geese, and screamers (order Anseriformes)
- Grebes (order Podicipediformes)
- Loons (order Gaviiformes)
- Storks (order Ciconiiformes)
- Flamingos (order Phoenicopteriformes)
- Cranes, rails, crakes, coots, moorhens, finfoots and limpkins (families Gruidae, Rallidae, Heliornithidae, and Aramidae within order Gruiformes)
- Kingfishers (subfamilies Alcedininae and Cerylinae of family Alcedinidae within order Coraciiformes)
- Dippers (family Cinclidae within order Passeriformes)
- Sunbitterns (family Eurypygidae within order Eurypygiformes)

== Evolution ==
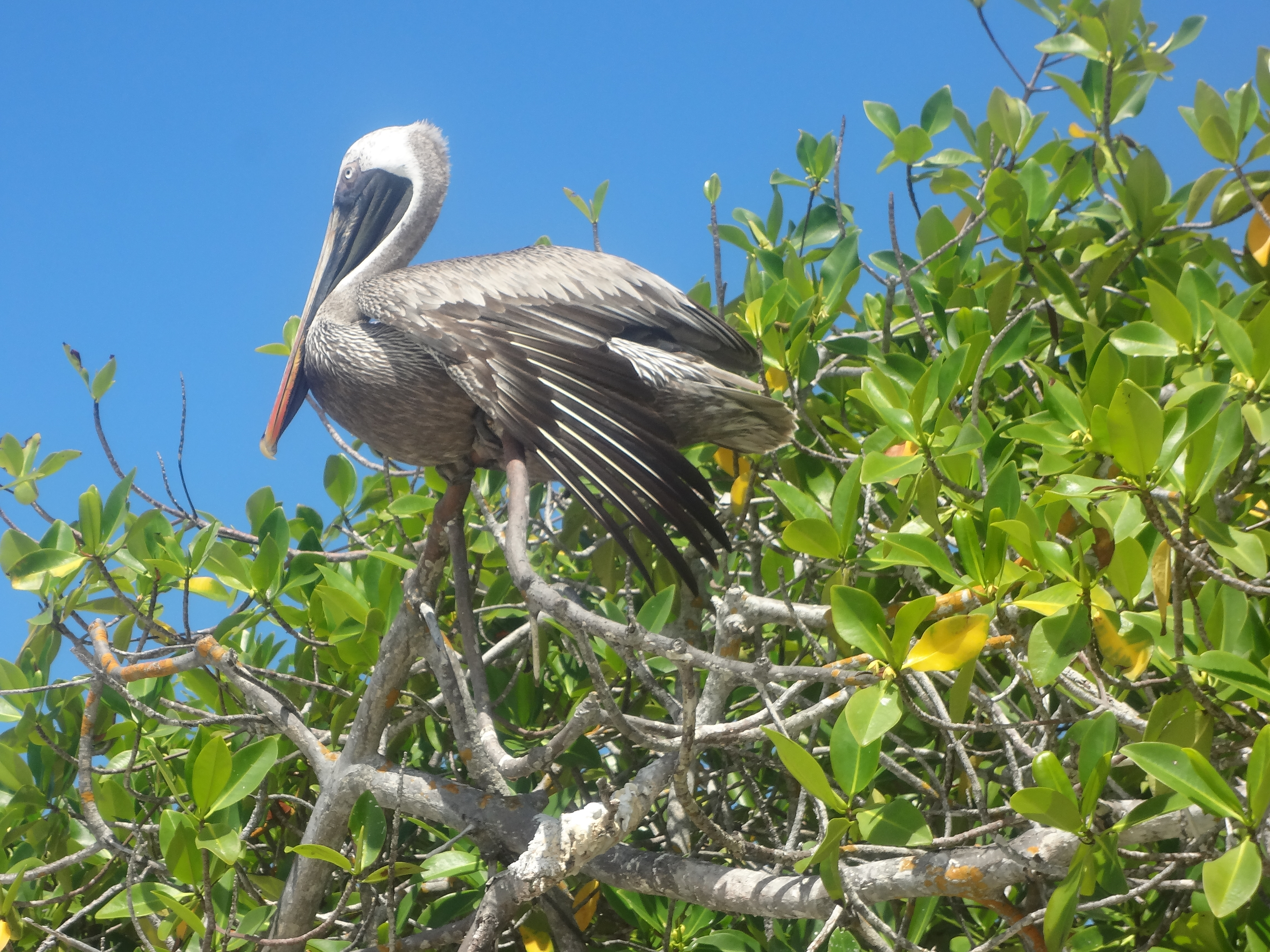
The Brown pelican (Pelecanus occidentalis) has an enlarged throat pouch to aid it in feeding on schools of small fish. It is a member of the order Pelecaniformes, which also contains the herons, bitterns, and ibises

The evolution of waterbirds is often mainly centered around adaptations to improve feeding techniques. This includes legs that are adapted to diving or wading and webbing between the toes. Many of these adaptations are common between different types of waterbirds. For example, flamingos and ducks share a similar filter-feeding lifestyle, and the shoebill has a similar structure (morphology) to many wading birds.

DNA sequence analysis, specifically the mitochondrial gene sequencing, has been used to classify and differentiate the various aquatic birds. This classification is found by a relative apparent synapomorphy analysis (RASA) which highlighted certain branches of genes that classified the domestic duck and fowl, for example, as an outgroup. Comparing and understanding these gene patterns allows scientists to classify aquatic birds.

== Conservation ==
Waterbird conservation efforts in the United States are advanced by numerous organizations, including the 700,000 member strong Ducks Unlimited. Employing such methods as conservation easements and outright purchase, it uses federal and state habitat reimbursements, sponsorships, member fees, major gifts, donations, royalties, and advertisement to raise over $200 million a year. A minimum of 80 percent of that revenue goes directly toward habitat conservation.

Ducks Unlimited partners with a wide range of corporations, governments, other non-governmental organizations, landowners, and private citizens to restore and manage areas that have been degraded and to prevent further degradation of existing wetlands. DU is also active in working with others to recommend government policies that will influence wetlands and the environment. Through March 2021, Ducks Unlimited had conserved at least 15 million acres of waterfowl habitat in North America.

To promote the conservation of waterbirds in America, the United States Fish and Wildlife Service established the Waterbird Conservation for the Americas to facilitate this over such a large area. The purpose of this initiative is to promote international cooperation and partnership to preserve waterbird habitats, create long term sustainability plans, implement specific conservation plans for regions, and support legal action for waterbird conservation on the regional and national levels.

A 2018 global study analyzing population trends of 461 waterbird species across multiple continents found that ineffective governance strongly predicts population declines, especially in regions like Central Asia, Sub-Saharan Africa, and South America. The study emphasized that effective governance is a critical factor for successful waterbird conservation.

== Extinction ==
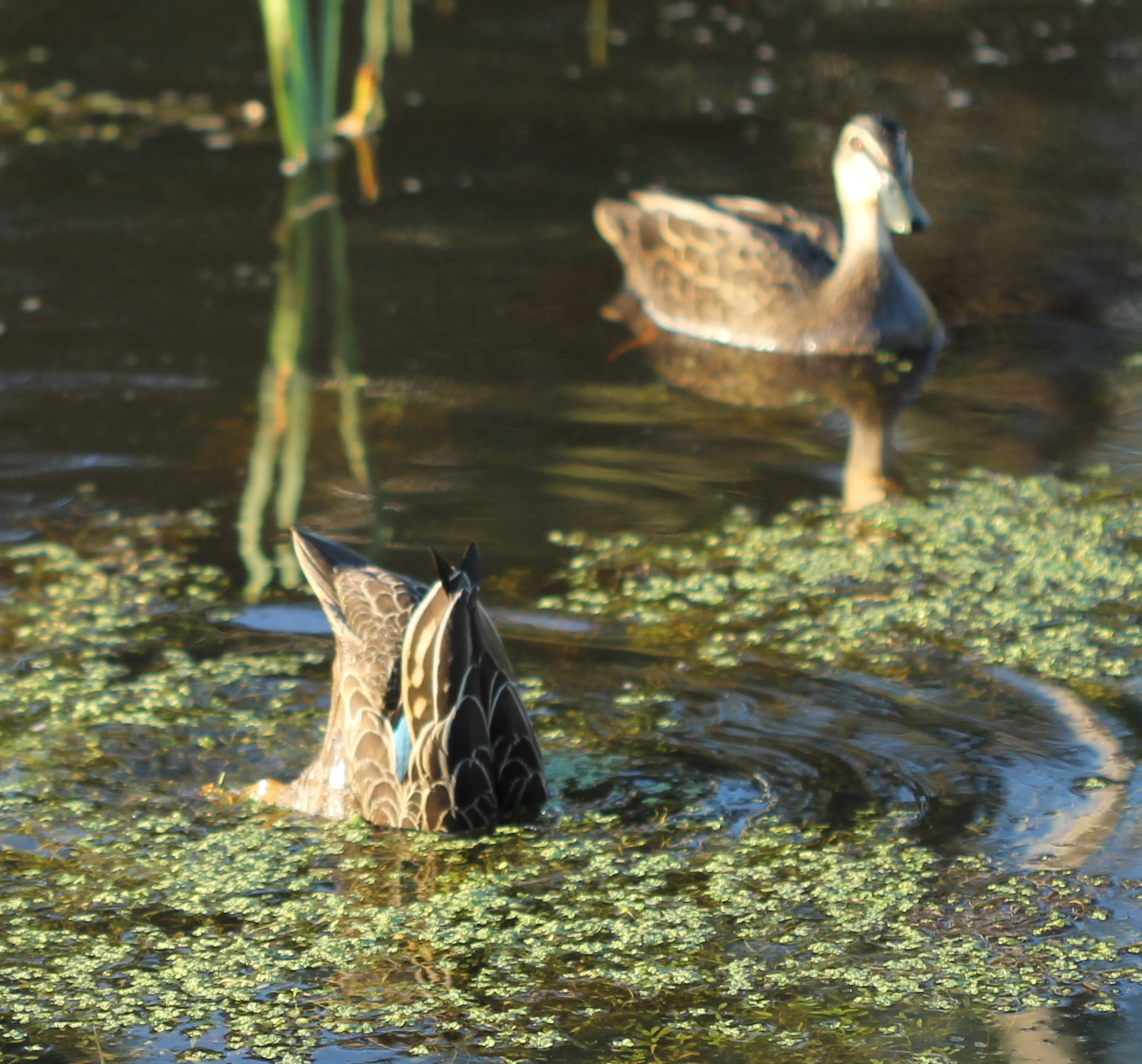
Pacific black ducks, one of the dabbling ducks, feeding in a wetland

The loss of wetlands has impacted waterbirds and is driving their extinction in regions where wetlands are polluted. Specifically, in China, 33% of wetlands were lost between 1978 and 2008, which is the primary breeding ground for China's waterbird species such as the Baer's pochard, which is now at risk for extinction. The Baer's pochard's population has decreased to between 150 and 700 birds in recent years due to negative environmental impacts on their habitat as well as human activities such as hunting and fishing.

This loss of wetlands is a result of various sources in China. The rise of urbanization and industries has resulted in pollution and waste in the water. In addition, reclamation projects for construction further threaten ruining the habitats of these birds. For example, the largest of these reclamation projects is the Oufei Project, which spans 8854 hectares.

== Interspecific competition ==
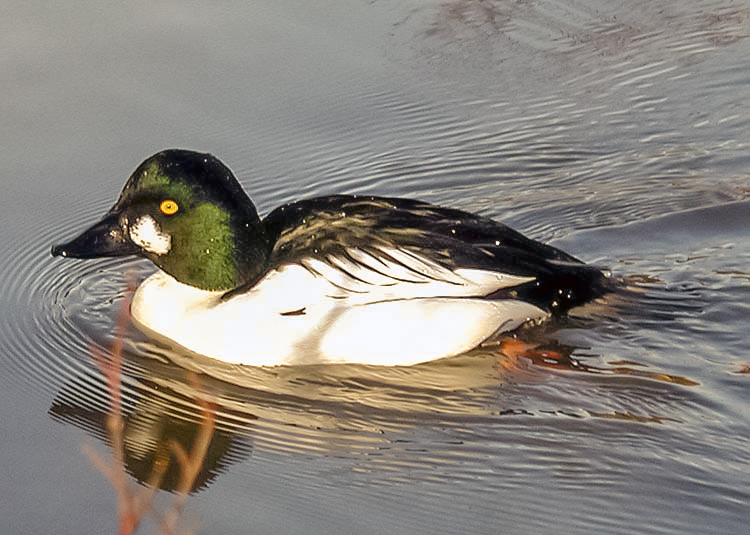
The Common goldeneye, a diving duck, lives on fish

Experimental evidence of competition has been difficult to obtain in highly mobile animals that cannot be meaningfully confined to plots of limited size. Many such animals are believed to compete with less mobile, resident taxa, but the supporting evidence has often remained circumstantial.

One example is the interaction between water birds and benthic feeding fish, or fish that feed at the lowest level of a body of water. Many migratory water birds use similar food resources on their breeding, molting, or overwintering grounds as do resident fish species. Studies, such as that done by Eadie and Keast in 1982, found an inverse relationship between the goldeneye (a water bird) and benthic feeding fish across multiple lakes.

Mobile water birds tend to avoid areas where their food density is high because this increases competition for resources. When there is abundant food in an area, there are more birds trying to eat it. This can lead to aggression and fighting, as well as a decrease in the overall fitness of the bird.

By avoiding areas of high food density, mobile waterfowl can reduce competition and improve their chances of survival. They can spread out and forage in less crowded areas, which allows them to avoid conflict and obtain the nutrients they need.

== Diseases ==
Outbreaks of diseases spread by waterbirds result from the transition of water-borne viruses to those wild birds. The spread can be caused by dead waterbirds in the vicinity of other organisms, or simply from waterbirds with the virus settling into more densely populated areas (whether by humans or other organisms).

=== Duck enteritis virus (DEV) ===
Duck plague (DP), also called duck enteritis virus (DEV), presents the most important concern in mass waterfowl production. Free-ranging water birds are the most likely infectious carriers. While the overall epidemiology of DEV is unknown in western Europe, studies conducted in Poland agree with the high levels of transmission between free-ranging water birds.

DEV is an aetiological agent of DP, which represents one of the most acute and lethal diseases of waterbirds, and infection can spread easily between farmed and wild waterbirds. Over 48 species of birds, including those not considered waterbirds, are susceptible to infection by DEV, and the mortality rate of this disease can reach up to 100%, especially in young birds.

=== H5N1 ===
Avian influenza caused by infection with H5N1, a highly pathogenic avian influenza virus (HPAIV), has spread in poultry in more than 60 countries in Eurasia and Africa since 1996, when the first outbreak occurred at a goose farm in the Guangdong province in China. H5N1 in wild birds have spread to Asia, Europe, and Africa, and it is possible for the H5N1 virus to be spread by migratory water birds to the west and south, as genetically closely related H5N1 viruses have been isolated in several countries since 2005.

H5N1 HPAIV infections have become endemic in several countries and cause accidental transmissions to humans. H5N1 viruses are thus now recognized as one of the most likely candidates for the next pandemic.

== Water bird population ==
In the January 2026 nationwide water bird census in Nepal, populations of over 50 species fell sharply compared with 2025, with counts declining at key sites such as Jagadishpur Lake and along the Rapti River. Total water bird numbers dropped by an estimated 20–30% at several major wetlands, with conservationists citing habitat loss, pollution, and human disturbance as key factors.
