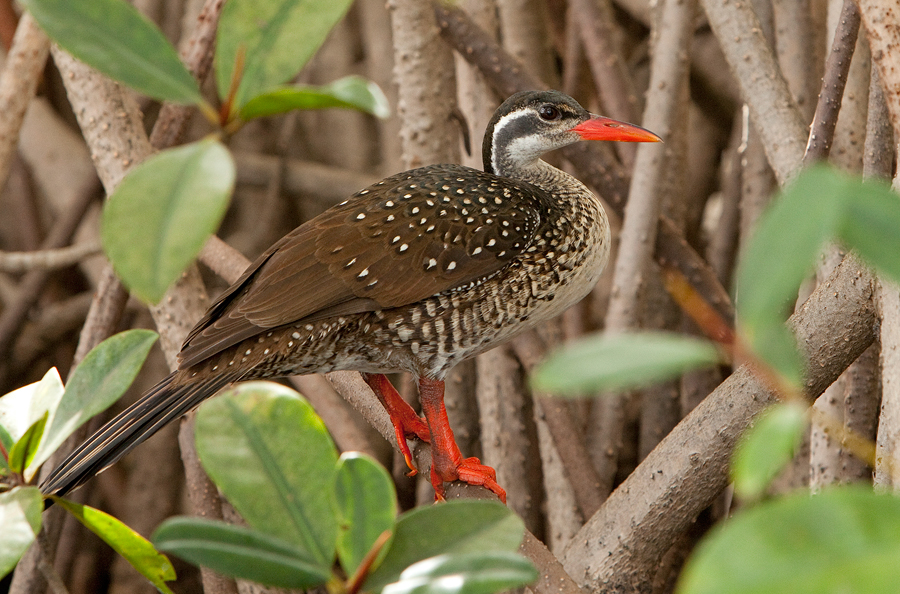
- African finfoot (adult male)

Scientific classification
- Kingdom: Animalia
- Phylum: Chordata
- Class: Aves
- Order: Gruiformes
- Family: Heliornithidae; GR Gray, 1840

Species
- African finfoot Podica senegalensis; Masked finfoot Heliopais personatus; Sungrebe Heliornis fulica; †Arabian finfoot Ornisus syriacus; O. s. syriacus † O. s. hulliana † O. s. mapi †

= Heliornithidae =

Heliornithidae Temporal range: Middle Miocene to present, 16–0 Ma

Family of tropical birds

The Heliornithidae are a small family of tropical birds with webbed lobes on their feet like those of grebes and coots. The family overall are known as finfoots, although one species is known as a sungrebe. The family is composed of three species in three genera.

== Description ==
Finfoots resemble rails; they have long necks, slender bodies, broad tails, and sharp, pointed bills. They have a diverse range of calls, but do not call frequently. Their legs and feet are brightly coloured and, unlike grebes, they are capable of walking well and even moving quickly on land.

== Habitat ==
Finfoots are found in numerous habitats in the tropics as long as there is water and cover. It is uncertain why cover is so essential to finfoots, but they are extremely secretive and often overlooked. Their ranges extend from coastal creeks to fast-moving mountain streams, most commonly being found in large slow-moving bodies of water. They also use swamps, reed beds, mangroves, and forest. Finfoots are territorial, probably for much of the year and certainly when breeding. They are not thought to undertake regular migrations, but some birds do regularly disperse and they are quick to colonise new areas of suitable habitat.

== Behaviour ==
=== Diet and feeding ===
Finfoots feed on a wide range of foods, insects of various sorts being the most frequently observed component of their diet. Little quantitative information on finfoot diet exists, but they have also been recorded eating molluscs, crustaceans, spiders, frogs, fish and some leaves and seeds. Unlike grebes they do not dive to obtain food, instead picking prey off the water's surface or foraging on the shore.

=== Breeding ===
All three species tend to breed after the wet season, the exact timing of which is dependent on the local climate. The breeding behaviour of the masked finfoot is almost entirely unknown. All three species exhibit some changes in appearance prior to breeding – masked finfoots develop a fleshy knob above the bill, and the plumage of the male African finfoot and female sungrebe also change. There is considerable variation within the finfoots on several aspects of breeding; in the Sungrebe the nest building and incubation duties are shared between the sexes, in the African finfoot the female alone incubates. The nests of all finfoots are untidy bowls of sticks, twigs, and reeds suspended in vegetation above water.

== Species ==
There are three species. The African finfoot is found in tropical Africa on streams in woodland. The masked finfoot has a scattered distribution from Eastern India down through southeast Asia to the Wallace Line. The sungrebe is found in tropical Central and South America. Finfoots are highly secretive and many aspects of their biology are unknown to science.

== Gallery ==
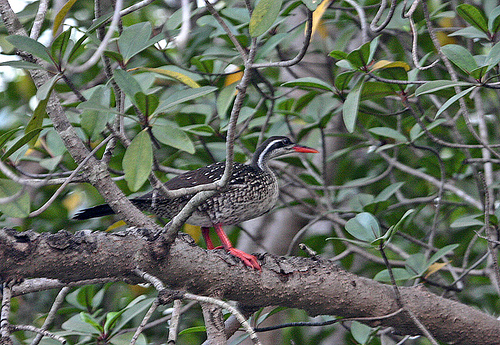
African finfoot, Podica senegalensis

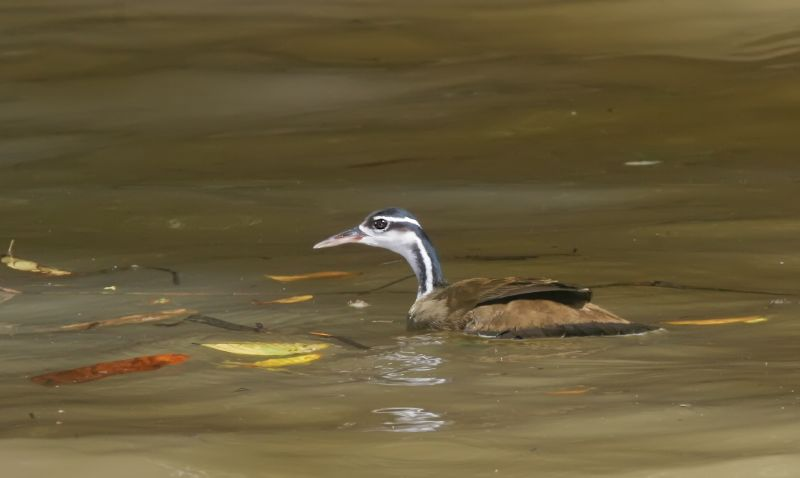
Sungrebe, Heliornis fulica

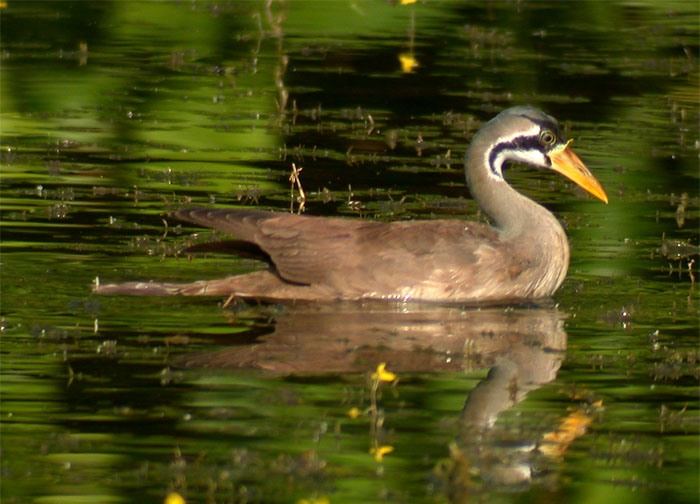
Masked finfoot, Heliopais personata
