= Refugee Advocacy Service of South Australia =

Australian non-profit

Refugee Advocacy Service of South Australia Inc. (RASSA) is a non-profit Community Legal Centre in South Australia. It was set up in 2002 to represent asylum-seekers in the Federal Court of Australia. From about 2007, it was de-funded and ceased to exist. It has, however, now began functioning again in order to assist asylum-seekers in the community in South Australia whose applications are still being processed.

== History ==
In April 2002, a group of lawyers from the Woomera Lawyers' Group set up and established the Refugee Advocacy Service of South Australia Inc.. The purpose of the center was to organise and centralise files for the vast number of asylum seekers who had sought, or were seeking, a judicial review of their original decisions in the Federal Court of Australia.

RASSA was originally conceived as a clearing house. However, it was not always able to locate appropriate solicitors. It often went on file as the instructing solicitor. Almost all of the work performed by the service or through the service was on a pro bono basis, with the exception of one employed legal officer or lawyer who worked part-time and one employed administrative officer. A group of lawyers, often comprising board members and other senior lawyers, reviewed each file to determine whether there was a prospect of a case being run. The legal officer and the board, who almost without exception were legally trained, would then seek out pro bono counsel to run the case.

RASSA's purpose was to provide legal representation for asylum seekers in the Federal Court of Australia and to assist asylum seekers in getting their cases remitted back to the Refugee Review Tribunal. RASSA's efforts were frustrated by the Commonwealth Parliament's inclusion of a privative clause into the Migration Act. This clause narrowly restricted the grounds of judicial review.

RASSA survived almost entirely on donations sent in from supportive members of the community or from fund raising events. RASSA was also awarded several grants. The centre also accumulated a number of cost orders which were donated by counsel when granted orders whilst acting for asylum seekers on behalf of the service.

The service was recognised as filling a major gap in legal services to a marginalised minority in a time of acute sensitivity in the Australian community to the issue of refugees.

== Founding board members ==
A number of South Australian lawyers contributed to assisting refugees (see for example Woomera Lawyers' Group). Some of these lawyers founded RASSA. The original founding board members, those who held office on the executive at various points throughout the first year, were:

- Gordon Barrett QC: Later appointed to the District Court of South Australia
- Kris Hanna M.P.: Former member of the South Australian Legislative Assembly
- Kaz Eaton: Solicitor at Bourne Lawyers
- Graham Harbord: Partner at Johnston Withers
- Aleecia Murray: later crowned Young Australian Lawyer of the Year by the Law Council of Australia for her work with RASSA and worked for the Lao Bar association
- Nicholas Llewellyn-Jones: Represented the Baxter protestors on behalf of Westside Lawyers. Instructing solicitor for the Australian Workers' Union in the landmark decision of Australian Industrial Relations Commission in the Three certified agreements case and part of the South Australian legal team in New South Wales v Commonwealth (Workplace Relations Challenge).
- Abby Hamdan: Instructing solicitor and junior counsel to Claire O'Conor in High Court of Australia in Al-Kateb v Godwin, and later became famous as she was pursued by the Commonwealth in a case involving privileged communication between her and one of her clients who was an asylum seeker MIMIA v Hamdan.

== Other major contributors ==
The service was supported by a wide range of barristers and other people involved in the law. Other people who played a prominent part in the operations of RASSA included:

- Robyn Layton QC (Justice of the Supreme Court of South Australia)
- Deslie Billich
- Faun Harbord
- Taruna McLean
- Thea Birss
- Kristy Molloy

== Activities ==
The service provided free representation in the Federal Court of Australia to any detainee who had an arguable case. It represented hundreds of asylum seekers through the pro bono support of members of the South Australian profession. RASSA held fund raising and profile raising events throughout Australia.

It acted on a pro bono basis for refugees in a number of cases, including the following:

=== 2002 ===
- Shahram Dorraji v Minister for Immigration Multicultural Affairs [2002] FCA 765 (17 June 2002)
- SBAK v Minister for Immigration Multicultural Indigenous Affairs [2002] FCA 731 (19 June 2002)
- Minister for Immigration Multicultural Affairs v SBAA [2002] FCAFC 195 (21 June 2002)
- SBBR v Minister for Immigration Multicultural Indigenous Affairs [2002] FCA 842 (3 July 2002)
- SCAN v Minister for Immigration [2002] FMCA 129 (9 July 2002)
- SDAD v Minister for Immigration [2002] FMCA 132 (9 July 2002)
- SDAH v Minister for Immigration Multicultural Indigenous Affairs [2002] FCA 1033 (19 August 2002)
- SDAG v Minister for Immigration Multicultural Indigenous Affairs [2002] FCA 1051 (26 August 2002)
- SDAA SDAB v Minister for Immigration [2002] FMCA 184 (30 August 2002)
- SDAF v Minister for Immigration [2002] FMCA 187 (30 August 2002)
- WAAG v Minister for Immigration [2002] FMCA 191 (30 August 2002)
- SFLB Anor v Minister for Immigration [2002] FMCA 196 (5 September 2002)
- SBBG v Minister for Immigration Multicultural Indigenous Affairs [2002] FCA 1451 (30 October 2002)
- SCAZ v Minister for Immigration Multicultural Indigenous Affairs [2002] FCA 1377 (6 November 2002)
- SFGB v Minister for Immigration Multicultural Indigenous Affairs [2002] FCA 1389 (15 November 2002)
- SDAN v Minister for Immigration and Multicultural and Indigenous Affairs [2002] FCAFC 351 (19 November 2002)
- SBBS v Minister for Immigration Multicultural Indigenous Affairs [2002] FCAFC 361 (22 November 2002)
- SBBJ v Minister for Immigration and Multicultural and Indigenous Affairs [2002] FCA 761 (28 November 2002)
- SCAR v Minister for Immigration Multicultural Indigenous Affairs [2002] FCA 1481 (28 November 2002)
- SCAX v Minister for Immigration and Multicultural and Indigenous Affairs [2002] FCA 1483 (28 November 2002)
- Minister for Immigration Multicultural Indigenous Affairsv SBAN [2002] FCAFC 431 (18 December 2002)
- SGJB v Minister for Immigration Multicultural Indigenous Affairs [2002] FCA 1601 (19 December 2002)

=== 2003 ===
- SGDB v Minister for Immigration Multicultural Indigenous Affairs [2003] FCA 74 (14 February 2003)
- SDAO Anor v Minister for Immigration Multicultural Indigenous Affairs [2003] FCA 132 (4 March 2003)
- SCAN v Minister for Immigration Multicultural Indigenous Affairs [2003] FCA 168 (11 March 2003)
- SGLB v Minister for Immigration Multicultural Indigenous Affairs (includes corrigendum dated 24 March 2003) [2003] FCA 176 (11 March 2003)
- SGKB v Minister for Immigration Multicultural Indigenous Affairs [2003] FCAFC 44 (18 March 2003)
- SHCB v Minister for Immigration Multicultural Indigenous Affairs [2003] FCA 229 (24 March 2003)
- Minister for Immigration Multicultural Indigenous Affairsv WAAG [2003] FCAFC 60 (9 April 2003)
- SHBB v Minister for Immigration [2003] FMCA 82 (11 April 2003)
- SGGB SGHB v Minister for Immigration [2002] FMCA 367 (1 May 2003)
- SGNB v Minister for Immigration [2003] FMCA 38 (1 May 2003)
- SBBA v Minister for Immigration Multicultural Indigenous Affairs [2003] FCAFC 90 (9 May 2003)
- SDAF v Minister for Immigration Multicultural Indigenous Affairs [2003] FCAFC 127 (14 May 2003)
- SFTB v Minister for Immigration Multicultural Indigenous Affairs [2003] FCAFC 108 (27 May 2003)
- SGDB v Minister for Immigration (No.2) [2003] FMCA 127 (28 May 2003)
- SBBG v Minister for Immigration Multicultural Indigenous Affairs [2003] FCAFC 121 (6 June 2003)
- Minister for Immigration Multicultural Indigenous Affairsv SCAR [2003] FCAFC 126 (6 June 2003)
- WAGL v Minister for Immigration Multicultural Indigenous Affairs [2003] FCA 595 (13 June 2003)
- SGBB v Minister for Immigration Multicultural Indigenous Affairs [2003] FCA 709 (16 July 2003)
- WABR v MIMA [2003] HCATrans 304 (14 August 2003)
- MIMIA v SGLB [2003] HCATrans 296 (14 August 2003)
- MIMIA v SGKB [2003] HCATrans 313 (14 August 2003)
- Minister for Immigration Multicultural Indigenous Affairs v VFAY [2003] FCAFC 191 (22 August 2003)
- SGNB v Minister for Immigration Multicultural Indigenous Affairs [2003] FCA 886 (22 August 2003)
- SAAK v Minister for Immigration Multicultural Indigenous Affairs [2003] FCA 921 (27 August 2003)
- WAHI v Minister for Immigration Multicultural Indigenous Affairs [2003] FCA 908 (28 August 2003)
- SGCB v Minister for Immigration Multicultural Indigenous Affairs [2003] FCA 909 (28 August 2003)
- SGCB v Minister for Immigration [2003] FMCA 464 (3 November 2003)
- Minister for Immigration Multicultural Indigenous Affairsv SGJB [2003] FCAFC 290 (16 December 2003)
- SHCB v Minister for Immigration Multicultural Indigenous Affairs [2003] FCAFC 308 (22 December 2003)

=== 2004 ===
- Secretary, Department of Immigration and Multicultural and Indigenous Affairs v Mastipour [2004] FCAFC 93
- MIMIA v SGLB [2004] HCATrans 9 (12 February 2004)
- SGDB v Minister for Immigration Multicultural Indigenous Affairs [2004] FCAFC 59 (15 March 2004)
- VQAB v Minister for Immigration Multicultural Indigenous Affairs [2004] FCAFC 104 (4 May 2004)
- WAJS v Minister for Immigration and Multicultural and Indigenous Affairs [2004] FCAFC 139 (21 May 2004)
- WAJW v Minister for Immigration [2004] FMCA 114 (17 June 2004)
- WAGO v Minister for Immigration [2004] FMCA 412 (28 June 2004)
- SFLB Anor v MIMIA [2004] HCATrans 301 (12 August 2004)
- SFHB v Minister for Immigration [2004] FMCA 317 (17 August 2004)
- Rahmatullah v Minister for Immigration Multicultural Indigenous Affairs [2004] FCAFC 200 (17 August 2004)
- WAJW v Minister for Immigration Multicultural Indigenous Affairs [2004] FCAFC 330 (20 December 2004)

=== 2005 ===
- SQMB v Minister for Immigration Multicultural Indigenous Affairs [2005] FCA 98 (18 February 2005)
- SCAF v Minister for Immigration Multicultural Indigenous Affairs [2005] FCA 237 (14 March 2005)
- SZDNI v Minister for Immigration Multicultural Indigenous Affairs [2005] FCA 253 (22 March 2005)
- Nguyen and Minister for Immigration and Multicultural and Indigenous Affairs [2005] AATA 444 (17 May 2005)
- NABE v MIMIA [2005] HCATrans 473 (1 August 2005)
- SQLB v Minister for Immigration Multicultural Indigenous Affairs [2005] FCA 1151 (1 August 2005)
- SYVB v Refugee Review Tribunal [2005] FCA 1093 (12 August 2005)
- SXGB v Minister for Immigration [2005] FMCA 1182 (26 August 2005)

=== 2006 ===
- Applicant M67/2003 v Minister for Immigration and Multicultural Affairs [2006] FCA 74 (10 February 2006)
- 74/06 Applicant M67/2003 v Minister for Immigration and Multicultural Affairs [2006] FCA 76 (10 February 2006)

== UN communications ==
RASSA also represented a number of asylum seekers who petitioned the United Nations Human Rights Committee concerning breaches of the International Covenant on Civil and Political Rights (ICCPR) by Australia. In this they had at least two successes, in which Australia was found to have breached the ICCPR by arbitrarily detaining nine men:

- Shafiq v Australia (2006)
- Shams et al. v Australia (2007)

== Recognition ==
RASSA has been discussed in academic papers and covered in domestic and international media.

The service was awarded a special notice from Australian Human Rights and Equal Opportunity Commission in 2003.
