= Rassas =

Rassas is a surname. Notable people with the name include:

- George James Rassas (born 1942), American priest
- Gismalla Abdalla Rassas (1932–2013), South Sudanese politician
- Nick Rassas (1944–2025), American football player

== See also ==
- Kalevi Rassa (1936–1963), Finnish hockey player
