= Druskininkų Rasa =

Beverage company based in Lithuania

- Founded: 1999
- Headquarters: Druskininkai, Lithuania
- Key people: Aurelijus Sinkevičius
- Products: Soft drinks, mineral water
- Revenue: ▲€22.929 € million (2024)
- Number of employees: 85
- Website: rasa.lt

Druskininkų Rasa, UAB is a significant Lithuanian manufacturer of bottled natural mineral water and soft drinks.

The company was founded in 1999 in the southern Lithuanian resort of Druskininkai, although mineral water from the local source was already bottled here earlier. The first references to Lithuanian mineral water, including that in Druskininkai, date from the Middle Ages.

== Production ==
Druskininkų Rasa makes the following products: soft drinks and mineral water.

Trademarks of Druskininkų Rasa:

- "Rasa light" mineral water;
- "Rasa namų limonadas" soft drink;
- "Rasa citrinų" soft drink;
- "Rasa eco" soft drink;
- "Rasa sultinga" soft drink;
- "Rasa juodųjų serbentų skonio sirupas" soft drink;
- "Rasa native cider" soft drink;
- "Rasa soda" soft drink;
- "Rasa agrastų" soft drink.
