= Electrolux Home Products Pty Ltd v Australian Workers' Union =

Judgement of the High Court of Australia

Electrolux v The Australian Workers' Union
- Court: High Court of Australia
- Full case name: Electrolux Home Products Pty Ltd v The Australian Workers' Union
- Decided: 2 September 2004
- Citations: [2004] HCA 40, (2004) 221 CLR 309; 209 ALR 116; 78 ALJR 1231

Case history
- Prior action: The AMWU v Electrolux [2002] FCAFC 199 (21 June 2002)

Case opinions
- (6:1) Appeal Upheld. Only matters that "pertain to the relationship between employer and employee" can be in an enterprise agreement. Bargaining agent's fee do not "pertain" so cannot be in an enterprise agreement.
- Majority: Gleeson CJ, McHugh, Gummow, Hayne, Callinan, Heydon JJ
- Dissent: Kirby J

Electrolux v The Australian Workers' Union was a 2004 decision by the High Court of Australia that held that a bargaining agent fee did not pertain to the relationship between employer and employee and so could not be included in an enterprise bargaining agreement.

== Background ==
The case dealt with whether bargaining agent's fees could be in an enterprise bargaining agreement as created by the Workplace Relations Act (Cth) 1996.

Bargaining agent's fees were politically contentious as they were seen as a form of compulsory union dues. They were expressly prohibited by the Parliament of Australia by the Workplace Relations Amendment (Prohibition of Compulsory Union Fees) Act 2003 No. 20, 2003 and then subsequently by the WorkChoices legislation.

== Decision ==
The High Court decided 6 judges to 1 (Kirby J dissenting) that only matters that "pertained to the relationship between employer and employee" could be placed in an enterprise bargaining agreement. Bargaining agent's fees did not could not be in the agreement.

== Aftermath ==
It was feared that on the logic of the High Court, many existing enterprise bargaining agreements had been certified invalidly and therefore could not be enforced, which forced the Parliament of Australia to pass the Workplace Relations Amendment (Agreement Validation) Act 2004 No. 155, 2004.

Furthermore, uncertainty existed around what could be placed in enterprise bargaining agreements in the future. Also, as unions could undertake protected industrial action or strikes only in pursuit of enterprise bargaining agreements, a serious question surrounded what unions could undertake strikes. That led to around 6 months of industrial confusion in which time, almost no enterprise bargaining agreements were certified and no industrial action occurred.

The industrial confusion specifically surrounded a raft of clauses, which, until the decision of Electrolux v AWU, had been commonly placed in enterprise bargaining agreements. Most of these clauses were union-friendly provisions: trade union training leave, right of entry, recognition of union delegates or shop stewards. (However, there was also some concern regarding provisions against the use of contract labour or setting the terms and conditions of contract labour and salary sacrifice into superannuation.)

Many argued that these types of clauses did not "pertain" and so could not be included into future enterprise agreements. That created considerable concern in the union movement as if the union-friendly provisions could not be included into future enterprise bargaining agreements, that would considerably limit union influence in the Australian worksite. The problem was comprehensively resolved by the Australian Industrial Relations Commission's landmark decision on 21 March 2005: the Schefenacker, the Murray Bridge and the La Trobe University certified agreements (the three certified agreements case). The decision determined what provisions the Commission would allow to be certified in enterprise agreements.

The decision was generally considered as a union victory, as it endorsed a whole raft of union friendly clauses.

One final consequence of the case of Electrolux v AWU is that it upheld several previous decisions of the High Court, which had decided that provisions allowing for payroll deductions of union dues did not "pertain to the relationship between employer and employee." Payroll deductions were consequently prohibited from being placed into enterprise agreements and so cannot be placed into enterprise agreements created under the WorkChoices reforms.

The relevance of Electrolux v AWU as an authority in Australian industrial relations in many ways ceased, with the introduction of the WorkChoices legislation reform package. However, consistent with the litigation itself, it was the consequent events that remained relevant. The decision of the three certified agreements case is still an applicable authority in determining what can and cannot be placed in an enterprise agreement.
