= Raas cat =

Breed of domestic cat

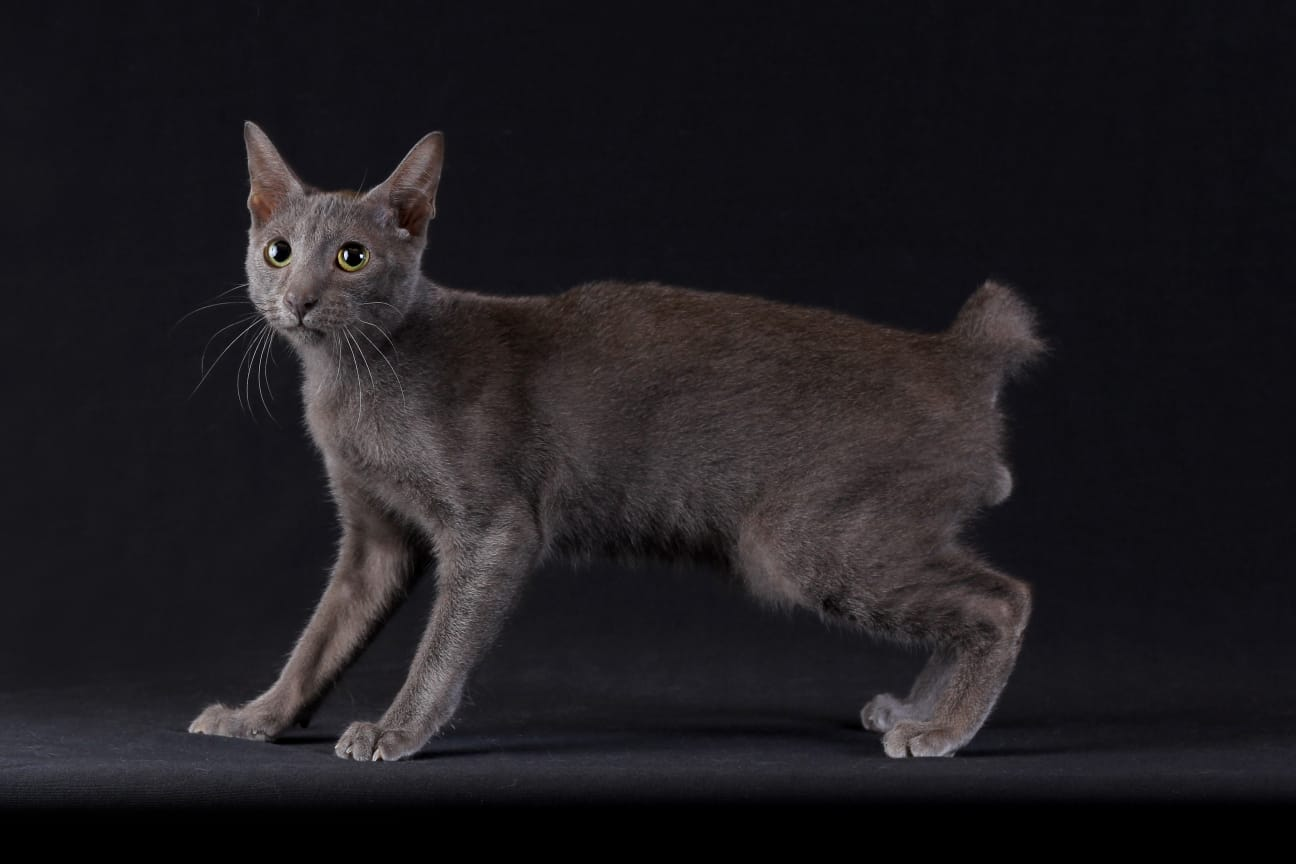
- Solid blue adult
- Other names: Madura cat
- Common nicknames: Busok cat (blue), Amethyst cat (chocolate), Busok-Raas, (Kucing) Buso
- Origin: Indonesia
- Foundation bloodstock: population on Madura and Raas Island
- Variety status: Not recognised as a standardised breed by any major breed registry.

Breed standards
- Other: IBRA; FFF

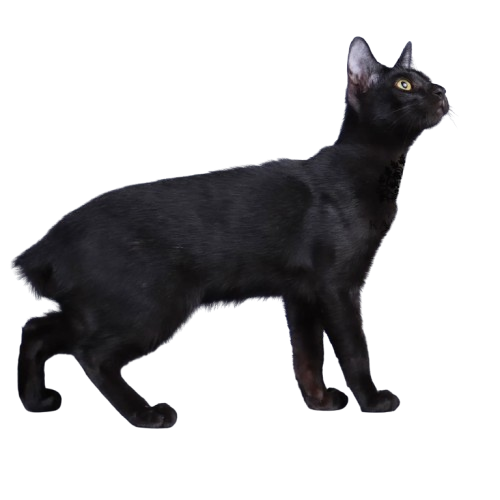
Solid black

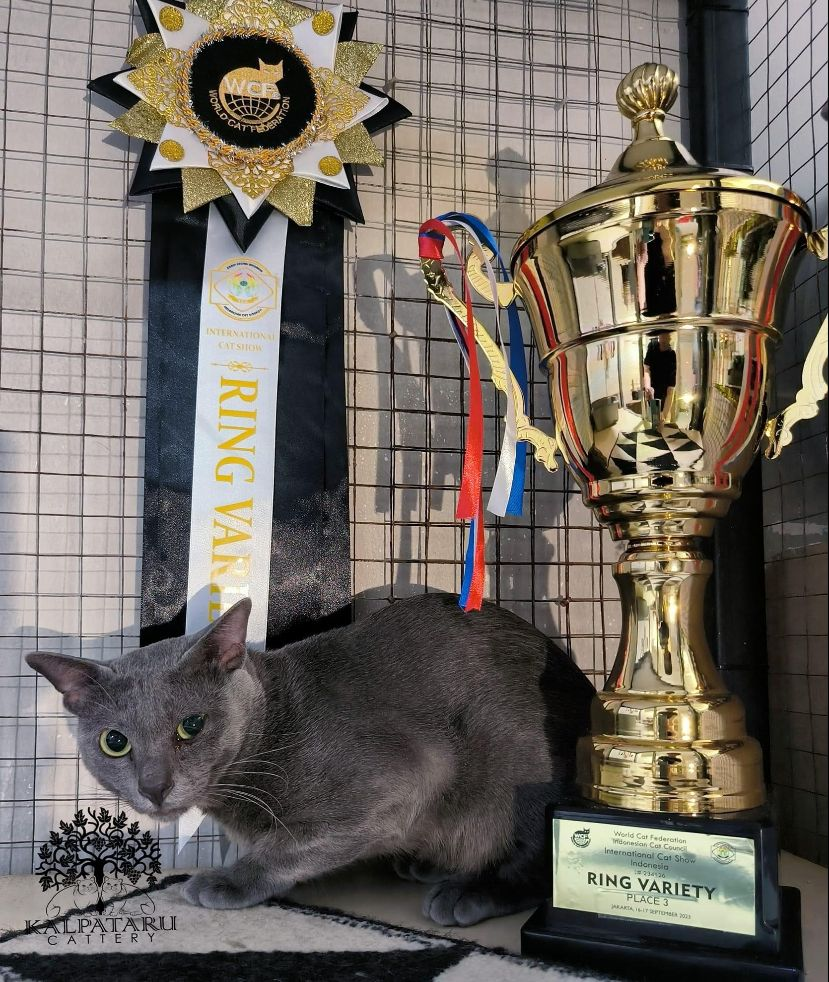
Solid blue cat champion in the World Cat Federation show in Jakarta, Indonesia (2023)

Raas, also known as the Busok(-Raas) or Madura, cat is an endemic breed of domestic cat native to the Madura and Raas Island in Indonesia. Its foundation stock derives from a naturally occurring local variety, that developed as a distinct landrace through long-term isolation of the island's cat population. It is not recognised as a cat breed in one of the major cat registries, though the breed is under development through selective breeding with pedigree registration as a formally standardised breed by local breeder clubs.

The Raas is medium-sized with a firm, muscular build and a naturally shortened tail, ranging from tailless (rumpy) to short bobtailed forms. The Raas comes in four colour variations – black, blue (Busok), chocolate (Amethyst), and lilac. It is considered rare, with a very small remaining population of genetically pure individuals maintained through limited breeding programmes within Indonesia.

== History ==
Historically, the Raas cat was a local domestic cat associated with myth and legend on Raas Island, its place of origin. Traditionally, the cat was regarded as a prestigious gift and was given by local elders (kyai) to honoured guests or visiting officials, which meant that ownership was limited and not widespread.

The foundation stock of the Raas breed is a landrace of domestic cat native to Raas Island, which is located east of the bigger Madura Island and forms part of the Raas District of Sumenep Regency in East Java, Indonesia. The island covers approximately 38.9 square kilometres and serves as the administrative centre of the district, which also includes several smaller surrounding islands.

== Breed registration ==
The Raas is not recognised as a cat breed in one of the major cat registries. However, it holds Provisional Class status under the breed name Busok with the Hong Kong-based Feline Fanciers Federation (FFF), which also registers the breed's pedigree.

The Raas has become more widely accessible and is now selectively bred in a controlled manner by 6 official catteries inside Indonesia for conservation, promotion, and national and international introduction. The breed development is supervised by a local independent breed club known as the Indonesian Busok Raas Association (IBRA).

=== Popularity ===
The breed is considered rare and has high genetic variation. As of 2016, it is estimated that there are less than 100 Raas with pure genes remaining. As of 2026, the breeding occurs by 6 official catteries inside Indonesia.

== Characteristics ==
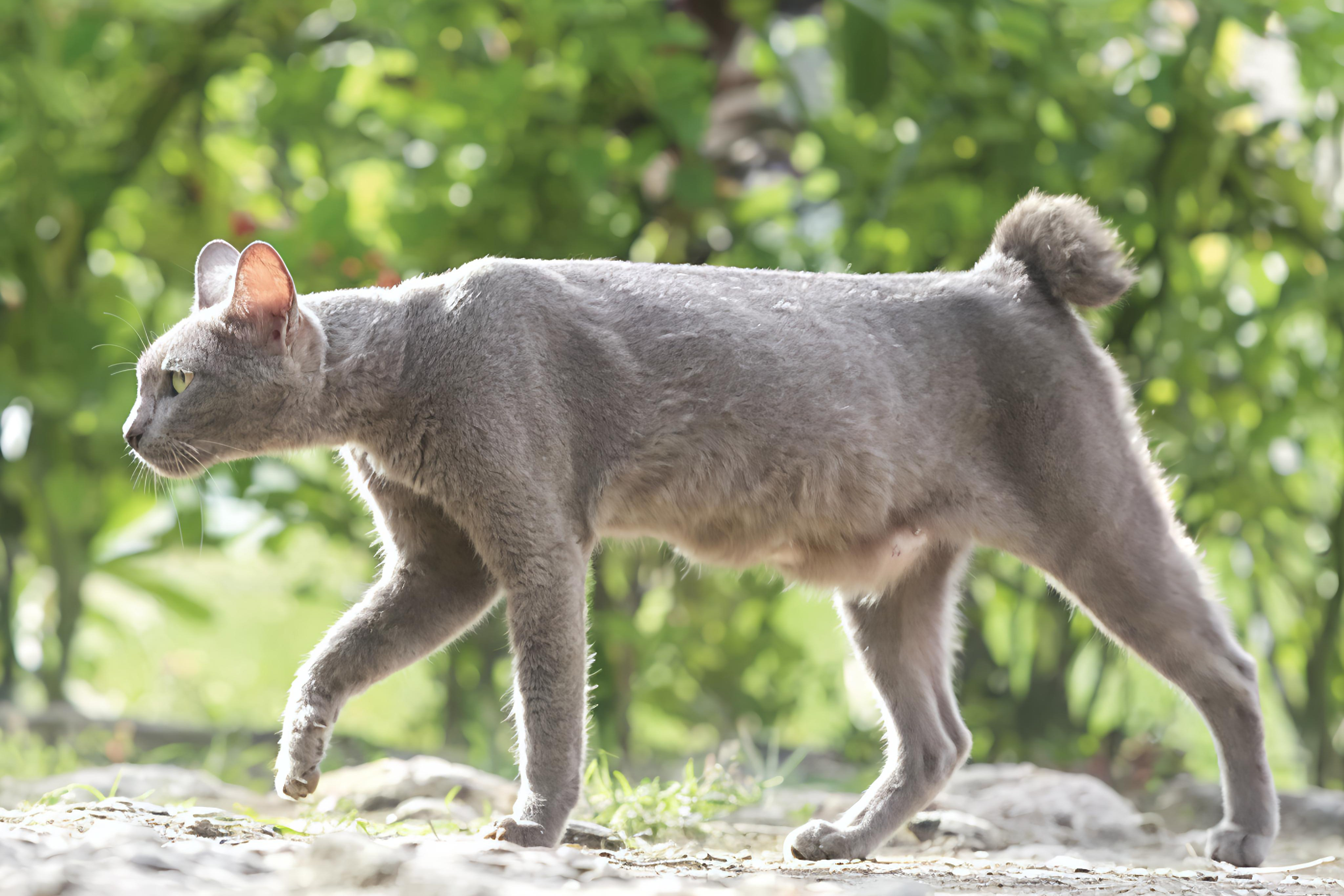
Solid blue (side view)

=== Appearance ===
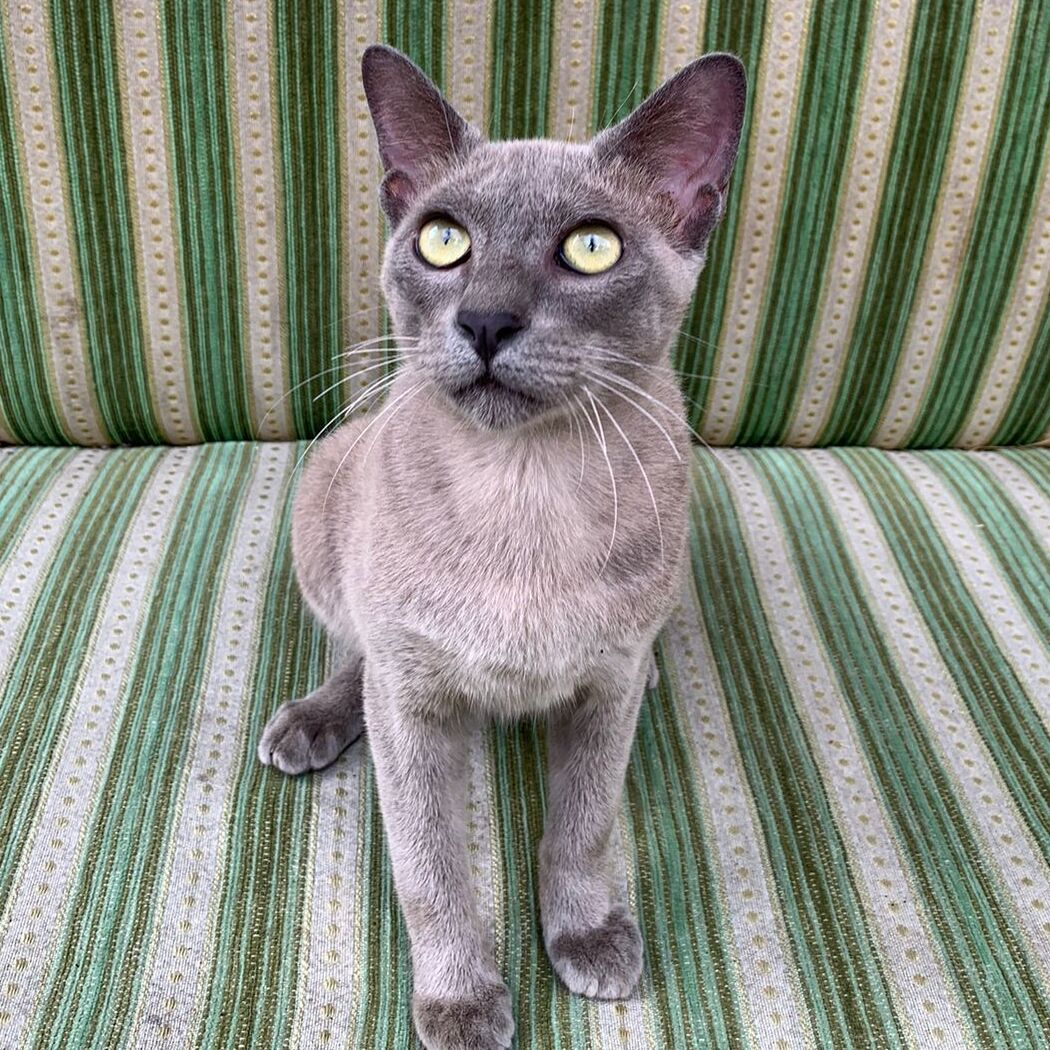
Blue mink

==== Head ====
The head is shaped as an equilateral triangle with rounded cheekbones and a smooth, slightly curved forehead, giving an overall elegant appearance. The nose is of medium length with a gentle nose break located below the eye line, tolerated up to approximately 3 mm. The muzzle is fine and wedge-shaped, with the tip of the chin aligned with the tip of the nose. The ears are medium to large, wide at the base, and well separated, with openings facing forward. When viewed from the front, they are positioned to point approximately toward the 11 and 1 o’clock positions. The outer edges of the ears continue the lines of the head and wedge.

The eyes are lemon-shaped to oval, bright, and expressive, with a wide open centre tapering toward the outer corners. The outer corners of the eyes align with the outer base of the ears. Eye colour varies and may include yellow, green, turquoise, or orange; blue eyes are not accepted in the breed standard.

==== Body ====
The body is medium in size, solid, and muscular, with medium bone structure. The shoulders and hips are aligned in parallel, and the body length is moderate. The neck is slim and relatively short. While muscular, the overall appearance is balanced rather than elongated. The legs are slim yet well-muscled. The hind legs are slightly longer than the front legs, contributing to the breed’s athletic stance. The tail is naturally short and may be rumpy (0 cm), rumpy riser (0–3 cm), stumpy (3–4 cm), or longy (4–10 cm). When present, the tail is typically kinked or bent at the tip.

The coat is short to medium in length, close-lying, smooth to the touch, and glossy in appearance. Accepted coat colours include blue, black, chocolate, and lilac. Cats with a blue colour are known as Busok, while those with a chocolate colour are known as Amethyst. Chocolate, and its dilute lilac, is a rare colour variation and is inherited as a recessive trait. A white belly is considered acceptable. A true pure Raas cat has a non-white and solid (preferably blue) coat though interbreeding with local cats on the islands has produced bicolours and – sepia, mink, and point – colourpoint patterns.

=== Behaviour ===
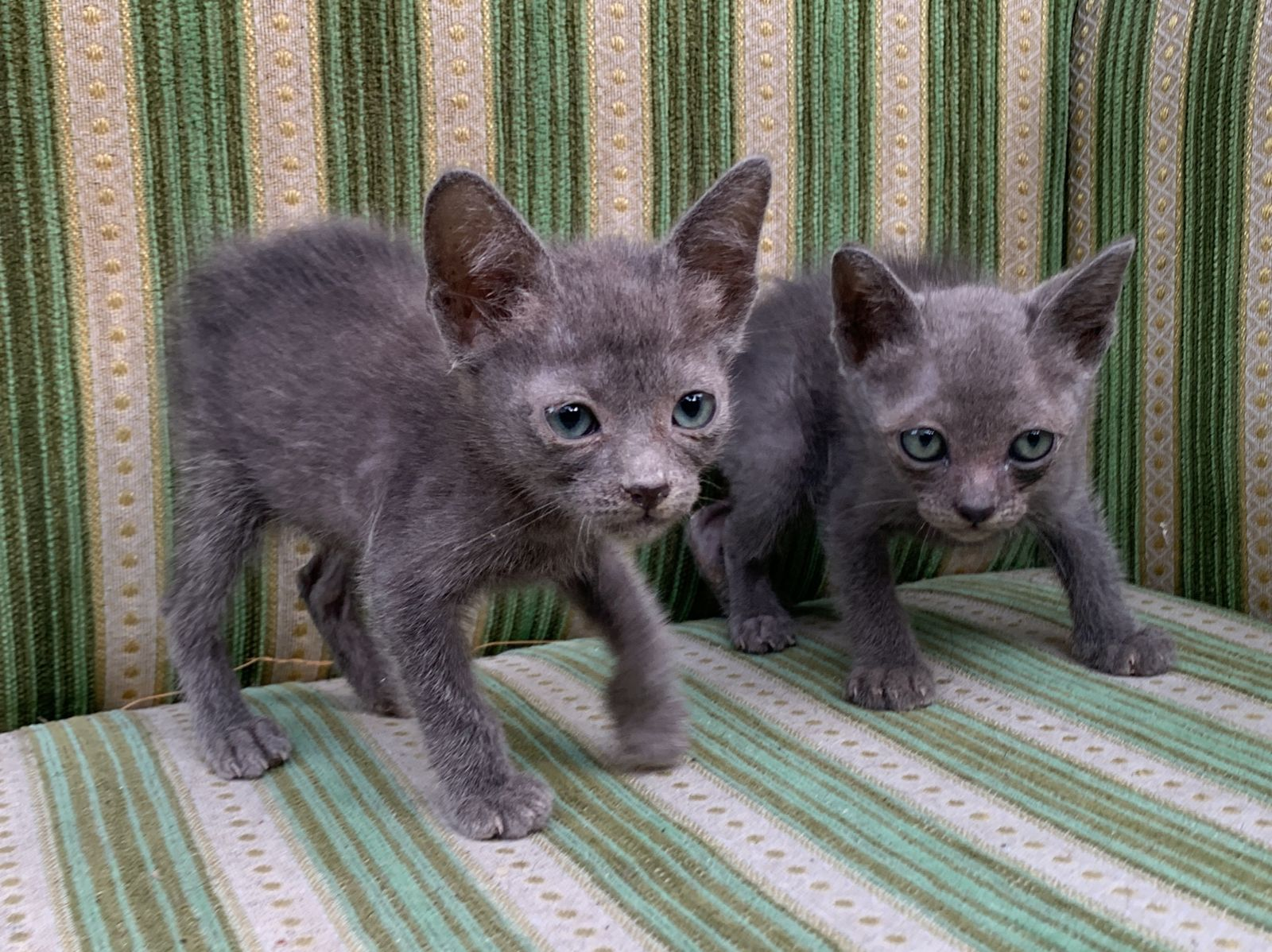
Solid blue kittens

Raas cats are known for their high activity level, athletic build, strong attachment to their owners, and a distinctive loud, deep vocalisation compared with other cat breeds. The breed is reported to be sensitive to cold temperatures and high humidity, and is typically kept indoors, especially during cooler or wetter seasons.

== See also ==
- List of cat breeds
