= Raaz =

Raaz (lit. 'secret' or 'mystery' in Persian) may refer to:

== Films ==
- Raaz (1959 film), a Pakistani Urdu-language suspense thriller film
- Raaz (1967 film), an Indian Hindi-language romantic thriller directed by Ravindra Dave
- Raaz (1981 film), an Indian Hindi-language film by Harmesh Malhotra, starring Raj Babbar
- Raaz (film series), an Indian mystery horror Hindi-language series produced by Mahesh and Mukesh Bhatt
  - Raaz (2002 film), directed by Vikram Bhatt
  - Raaz: The Mystery Continues, 2009 film directed by Mohit Suri
  - Raaz 3: The Third Dimension, 2012 sequel directed by Vikram Bhatt
  - Raaz: Reboot, 2016 sequel directed by Vikram Bhatt

== People ==
- Raaz Chandpuri (1892–1969), Indian writer
- Vijay Raaz (born 1963), Indian actor

== See also ==
- Raz (disambiguation)
- Raas (disambiguation)
- Razi (disambiguation)
- Raazi, 2018 Indian spy-thriller film by Meghna Gulzar
- Rahasyam (disambiguation)
