= Relative apparent synapomorphy analysis =

Relative apparent synapomorphy analysis, or RASA, is a method that aims to determine whether a given character is shared between taxa due to shared ancestry or due to convergence. A synapomorphy is a shared trait found among two or more taxa and their most recent common ancestor, whose ancestor in turn does not possess the trait. RASA assigns a score to the character based on its potential to be informative.

== Limitations ==
The method performs poorly when used to select an outgroup taxon, to quantify the amount of phylogenetic signal present, or to identify taxa that may be prone to long branch attraction.
