= Adam Raška (ice hockey, born 1994) =

Czech ice hockey player

- Born: November 26, 1994 (age 31) Kopřivnice, Czech Republic
- Height: 5 ft 11 in (180 cm)
- Weight: 187 lb (85 kg; 13 st 5 lb)
- Position: Forward
- Shoots: Left
- Czech Extraliga team Former teams: HC Kometa Brno; Piráti Chomutov; Orli Znojmo; Motor České Budějovice; BK Mladá Boleslav; Sheffield Steelers
- Playing career: 2013–present

Adam Raška (born November 26, 1994) is a Czech professional ice hockey forward currently playing with Czech Extraliga side HC Kometa Brno. He last played for UK Elite Ice Hockey League (EIHL) side Sheffield Steelers.

== Playing career ==
Raška made his Czech Extraliga debut playing with HC Kometa Brno debut during the 2012–13 Czech Extraliga season.
