= Australian Pay and Classification Scales =

The Australian Pay and Classification Scales were legal instruments that formed part of the 2006 WorkChoices amendments to Australian labour law. These instruments were abolished when the Fair Work Act 2009 commenced operation in 2010.

WorkChoices removed wage rates from federal awards and Notional Agreements Preserving State Awards (NAPSAs). On 27 March 2007, for employees covered by the WorkChoices system, notional Australian Pay and Classification Scales were established.

While every federal award and NAPSA had its own notional Scales existing at law, actual documents encapsulating the Scales were never created or published. On 18 December 2007 the Australian Fair Pay Commission announced it would suspend the creation and publication of Scales. Instead, "Pay Scale Summaries" were eventually published by the Workplace Authority (and remain available from the Fair Work Commission website). They include this disclaimer: "the Commonwealth of Australia does not give any guarantee, undertaking or warranty whatsoever in relation to the summary, including in relation to the accuracy, completeness or currency of the summary." However, they also state that satisfaction of the terms of the summaries will satisfy the Workplace Ombudsman that the employer has complied with its obligations under the relevant Scales.

Scales contained coverage provisions, classifications, frequency of payment provisions, and wage rates including casual loadings, junior, trainee and apprentice rates. Wage rates may be expressed as basic periodic rates of pay (an hourly rate) or, where an award or NAPSA contains such provisions, as basic piece rates of pay. Changes from the previous system of wages contained in awards included that basic periodic rates were in an hourly (rounded) rather than weekly form, and that wage rates were adjusted by the Australian Fair Pay Commission rather than the Australian Industrial Relations Commission.

Penalty rates, allowances and loadings other than casual loadings remained allowable award matters. Therefore, provisions for such entitlements in existing awards continued to apply, but only to employees covered by the relevant award. Certain employees in the WorkChoices system were "Payscale only" employees - that is, their minimum terms and conditions at work came only from the Australian Fair Pay and Conditions Standard and the relevant Scales. These employees included those who worked for businesses created on or after 27 March 2006, and employees previously covered by a collective agreement (CA) or Australian Workplace Agreement (AWA) that was terminated on or after 27 March 2006.

Where a CA or AWA was lodged after 27 March 2006 (a post-reform agreement), it was not to contain provisions that were less than the Standard, including the relevant Scales. Where a post-reform agreement contained a basic periodic or piece rate of pay less than the relevant Scales, the Scales would override that agreement provision.
