= Queensland Industrial Relations Commission =

State government funded Independent industrial relations tribunal for Queensland

- Established: 1990
- Jurisdiction: Queensland
- Location: Level 21, Central Plaza 2; 66 Eagle Street; Brisbane, Queensland
- Composition method: Appointments approved by the Governor of Queensland on the recommendation of the Queensland Government
- Authorised by: Industrial Relations Act 2016 (QLD)
- Appeals to: Industrial Court of Queensland
- Website: www.qirc.qld.gov.au

President
- Currently: Hon. Justice Peter Davis
- Since: 10 July 2020

The Queensland Industrial Relations Commission (QIRC) is an industrial relations tribunal established under Queensland's Industrial Relations Act 2016 to arbitrate, mediate, and determine employment and industrial relations matters in that state. With Queensland's private sector referred to federal regulation by the Fair Work Act, the QIRC's main focus is on Queensland public sector state and local government employees.

== History ==
In 1912, the Denham government introduced and passed the Industrial Peace Act 1912 (QLD), establishing the Industrial Court of Queensland, which then served as the primary mechanism for resolving industrial disputes in Queensland for the next 50 years.

In 1961, the Nicklin government passed the Industrial Conciliation and Arbitration Act 1961 (QLD), forming the Industrial Conciliation and Arbitration Commission (ICAC).

The Queensland Labor government of Wayne Goss introduced the Industrial Relations Act 1990 (QLD), amending the composition and duties of the ICAC and changing its name to the present-day Queensland Industrial Relations Commission (QIRC).

In 2016, the Palaszczuk government repealed the earlier legislation and passed the Industrial Relations Act 2016 (QLD), noting its main purpose was to "provide for a framework for cooperative industrial relations that is fair and balanced and supports the delivery of high quality services, economic prosperity and social justice for Queenslanders."

== Jurisdiction and Functions ==
The QIRC mostly deals with industrial matters affecting state and local government employees, and a limited number of private sector workers who remain under the state system. Its major functions include:

- Hearing wage underpayment claims
- Making, amending and interpreting modern awards for workers covered by the Queensland state system
- Approving and interpreting certified agreements
- Resolving state and local government industrial disputes through conciliation and arbitration
- Deciding unfair dismissal and reinstatement applications
- Dealing with industrial action and bargaining issues
- Hearing appeals from decisions of the Industrial Registrars
- Determining matters in areas where it is empowered by legislation, such as the Public Service Act 2008 (QLD) and Work Health and Safety Act 2011 (QLD)

The QIRC can also hear disputes involving state-registered industrial organisations and provides guidance on union registration, amalgamation, and internal governance.

Appeals against decisions of a single Commissioner may be made to the Full Bench while appeals against the Commission in such matters as errors of law or exercise of jurisdiction may be made to the Industrial Court of Queensland. Appeals against decisions of the Full Bench are heard in the Queensland Court of Appeal.

== Composition ==
There are currently 13 Members of the Commission. The Commission is headed by the President, who is also the President of the Industrial Court of Queensland. Justice Peter Davis was appointed to the dual role of president of the Industrial Court and president of the Commission in July 2020. He formerly served as a justice of the Supreme Court of Queensland. The Commission additionally includes the Vice President, two Deputy Presidents and nine Industrial Commissioners. At September 2025, the current members of the Commission are:

=== President ===
- Hon. Justice Peter Davis

=== Vice President ===
- Daniel L. O'Connor OAM

=== Deputy Presidents ===
- John W Merrell
- Catherine M. Hartigan

=== Commissioners ===
- Minna L. Knight
- Samantha C. Pidgeon
- John C. Dwyer
- Jacqueline M. Power
- Roslyn D. H. McLennan
- Daniel G. Pratt
- Sharron M. Caddie
- Christopher J. Gazenbeek
- Peter B. O'Neill

== Notable former commissioners ==
- Terri Butler, Commissioner (2024), Federal Member for Griffith (2014–2022), Deputy President of the Fair Work Commission (2024–)
- Glenn Martin, President (2013–2020), Justice of the Supreme Court of Queensland (2007–2025)

== See also ==
- Fair Work Commission
- Fair Work Ombudsman
- List of Queensland courts and tribunals
- Queensland Civil and Administrative Tribunal
- Australian Industrial Relations Commission
