= Australian Fair Pay and Conditions Standard =

Set of five minimum statutory entitlements

The Australian Fair Pay and Conditions Standard was a set of five minimum statutory entitlements for wages and conditions introduced as part of the Howard government's WorkChoices amendments to Australian labour law in 2006 and then abolished by the Fair Work Act 2009 in 2010.

The five statutory entitlements the Standard dealt with were:

- basic rates of pay and casual loadings
- maximum ordinary hours of work
- annual leave
- personal leave (including carer's leave and compassionate leave)
- parental leave and related entitlements.

The Standard came into effect on 27 March 2006. The employment conditions and wages of employees covered by the Standard had to meet or exceed the Standard's provisions. Compliance was ensured by Workplace Ombudsman inspectors, with powers to investigate disputes and enforce valid claims.

The Standard was replaced by the National Employment Standards when the Rudd government passed the new Fair Work Act 2009 on 1 January 2010.

== Scope ==
Because the changes under WorkChoices largely relied on the corporations power under the Australian Constitution, the Standard did not apply to all Australian workers. It applied to all employees in Victoria, the ACT, the Northern Territory, Christmas Island and Cocos (Keeling) Island because they were already within the federal workplace relations system. In Victoria, the application of the Standard (although universal) was slightly different in terms of how wage rates were adjusted by the Australian Fair Pay Commission.

In other parts of Australia, the following specific categories of employers and employees were not covered by the Standard:

- workers whose employers were not constitutional corporations (unless their employers fell within other specified categories);
- employees who were bound to an Australian Workplace Agreement which had been approved by the Office of the Employment Advocate prior to 27 March 2006;
- workers covered by a Certified Agreement that had been filed with or certified by the Australian Industrial Relations Commission prior to 27 March 2006. In the case of an agreement that had been filed before this date, but not yet certified, the employer would have had to meet the Standard until the certification took place;
- employees who were bound by a state employment agreement that was made prior to 27 March 2006, insofar as the agreement addressed conditions otherwise addressed by the Standard.

Some entitlements under the Standard did not apply to casual employees. Generally, casuals had no entitlement to annual leave, personal/carer's leave or compassionate leave. However, unpaid parental leave was available to eligible casual employees. Casuals were also eligible for unpaid carer's leave. In return for having no annual leave or personal leave entitlements, casuals without an entitlement under an industrial instrument were guaranteed a minimum casual of 20%.

== Provisions ==
=== Ordinary hours ===
The Standard provided for a guaranteed maximum of 38 ordinary hours of work per week. It allowed for an averaging of an employee's weekly hours of work over a 12-month period by written agreement between the employer and employee. Employees could also be asked to work reasonable additional hours and had the right to refuse to work hours not considered 'reasonable'. The question of what constituted 'reasonable' depended on the particular circumstances of the employee, but included factors such as any risk to the employee's health or safety, the hours worked by the employee in the previous four weeks, the notice given by the employer of the requirement to work the additional hours, and the notice given by the employee of the refusal to work those hours, and the operational requirements of the business.

A three-year transitional period was created in relation to maximum ordinary hours and federal awards and Notional Agreement Preserving a State Awards. During this period, an award term that provided a lower standard than the maximum ordinary hours guaranteed by the Standard continued to operate. In other words, the award term continued until 27 March 2009.

=== Annual leave ===
The Standard provided an entitlement to four weeks' paid annual leave each year. All full-time and part-time employees covered by WorkChoices were entitled to paid annual leave. Part-time employees accrued their annual leave on a pro rata basis. Annual leave accrued for each completed four-week period of continuous service and was cumulative. Casual employees did not have an entitlement to annual leave under the Standard. Continuous shift workers received an additional week of annual leave, provided they regularly worked both Sundays and public holidays.

When taking annual leave, employees were entitled to at least the basic pay rate they were on at the time of commencing the annual leave. It was possible for employees to request to cash out up to 2 weeks (or the pro rata equivalent for part-time employees) of their accrued annual leave entitlement every 12 months. However, this could only occur if a term in a workplace agreement specifically permitted cashing out. Requests to cash out annual leave had to be in writing and could be refused by an employer. An employer could not require an employee to cash out an entitlement to annual leave, or exert undue influence or pressure on an employee.

=== Personal/carer’s leave, compassionate leave, and family and domestic violence leave ===
Under the Standard, sick leave was referred to as personal leave. Carer's leave was part of the same entitlement and could be used to provide care and support to a member of an employee's immediate family or household. Ten days of paid personal/carer's leave were available for employees every year. For part-time employees and those who were within the first 12 months of employment, this type of leave was available on a pro-rata basis. Casual employees were not eligible for paid personal/carer's leave.

Personal/carer's leave was cumulative. There was no limit on the amount of accumulated sick leave that could be taken each year. However, the taking of paid carer's leave was limited to 10 days in the first year of employment and 12 days in subsequent years.

On top of these basic entitlements, there was provision for an additional two days' unpaid emergency carer's leave per occasion where an employee had exhausted their paid personal/carer's leave entitlements. Casual employees were also entitled to unpaid carer's leave. There was also provision for two days of paid compassionate leave per occasion, when a member of immediate family or household had a life-threatening illness or injury, or died. Compassionate leave operated separately from personal/carer's leave. This meant it was not necessary to exhaust personal/carer's leave entitlements to access compassionate leave.

In addition to these, all employees are entitled to 5 days of unpaid family and domestic violence leave each year. The new Labor Government has also introduced a bill, the Fair Work Amendment (Paid Family and Domestic Violence Leave) Bill, which if passed will see all employees able to access 10 days of paid family or domestic violence leave from 1 February 2023, or 1 August 2023 for small businesses (those with less than 15 employees).

=== Parental leave ===
Unpaid parental leave was available up to a maximum of 52 weeks. This 52 weeks could be shared between both parents at the time of the birth of a child, or the adoption of a child under five years of age. Parental leave under the Standard applied to all full-time, part-time and eligible casual employees who had at least 12 months continuous service with the same employer. Casual employees became eligible when they had been employed with the same employer on a regular and systematic basis for at least 12 months with a reasonable expectation of ongoing employment. These parental leave provisions also applied more broadly to employees outside of the WorkChoices system. In other words, those employed by a sole trader, trust, partnership or other unincorporated entity were also covered. Mothers must have had a continuous period of 6 weeks of maternity leave immediately after giving birth to a child. Special maternity leave (unpaid) could have been taken if a pregnancy was terminated within 28 weeks of the expected date of birth or pregnancy-related illness. It also required a minimum of 12 months' service for eligibility.

=== Minimum pay ===
Under the Standard, basic hourly rates were guaranteed pay rates set by the Australian Fair Pay Commission. The commission set the Federal Minimum Wage (FMW), classification-based wages in Australian Pay and Classification Scales (APCSs), and casual loadings. The default minimum casual loading for employees not covered by an industrial instrument was set to 20 percent. The commission also had the power to set minimum rates of pay for juniors, trainees and apprentices, employees with disabilities and piece workers.

The Fair Pay Commission had the power to decide the timing, scope and frequency of wage reviews, the manner in which they were conducted and when wage decisions would come into effect. Employees who were not covered by an APCS (other than juniors, trainees and apprentices, employees with disabilities and piece workers) had to be paid at least the FMW, which had initially been $12.75 per hour. The first decision of the AFPC raised the minimum wage to $13.47 per hour as of 1 December 2006. It was subsequently raised to $13.74 in July 2007 and $14.31 in July 2008. The AFPC decided not to increase the FMW in 2009.

== Criticism ==
Opponents of the WorkChoices reforms, such as the Australian Council of Trade Unions, had a range of criticisms of the changes. In terms of the Standard, the main criticisms were that it would not protect minimum wages and that it would undermine many conditions and entitlements workers previously enjoyed. The option of cashing out annual leave, although only possible under specific conditions, was also cited as something which would undermine previous entitlements.

=== Minimum wages ===
The standard was criticised by the ACTU on the grounds that the Australian Fair Pay Commission was not as independent as the Australian Industrial Relations Commission. According to the ACTU, the Howard government wanted to reduce the minimum wage and it claimed that it would appoint people to the Fair Pay Commission who would carry out its agenda. This argument was based partially on the Howard government's previous opposition to minimum wage increases.

=== Replacing the award safety net ===
The ACTU claimed the five minimum conditions was not sufficiently comprehensive. They argued employees could lose entitlements they previously had, including wage rates based on skill levels, standard hours of work, work-related allowances, annual leave loading, redundancy pay, overtime pay, and weekend and shift work rates of pay. Employees who previously had these entitlements under an industrial instrument would retain them. However, because they were not covered by the Standard, they could be subject to negotiation between employers and employees in an Australian Workplace Agreement.

During a Senate Estimates hearing on 29 May 2006, Peter McIlwain, Head of the Office of the Employment Advocate detailed that from a sample of 4 per cent, or 250, of the total 6,263 AWAs lodged during April 2006 after WorkChoices was introduced:

- 100% of AWAs removed at least one protected award condition
- 64% of AWAs removed annual leave loadings
- 63% of AWAs removed penalty rates
- 52% of AWAs cut out shift loadings
- 40% of AWAs dropped gazetted public holidays
- 16% of AWAs removed all award conditions and only met the five minimum conditions of the Standard.

== Abolition under the Fair Work Act ==
As part of its industrial relations changes, the Rudd government proposed to augment the Standard by creating 10 National Employment Standards. It released a discussion paper calling for public feedback on 14 February 2008. In addition to the existing matters dealt with under the Standard, the National Employment Standards also covered matters relating to requests for flexible working arrangements, community service leave, long service leave, public holidays, notice of termination and redundancy pay, and requirements for an information statement to be provided to employees. When the Fair Work Act 2009 was passed by the Rudd government and came into effect on 1 January 2010, the Standard ceased to exist.
