= Sectoral collective bargaining =

Form of labor organizing allowing unions to cover a large set of economic activity

Sectoral collective bargaining is an aim of trade unions to reach a collective agreement that covers all workers in a sector of the economy. It contrasts to enterprise bargaining where agreements cover individual firms. Generally countries with sectoral collective bargaining have higher rates of union organisation and better coverage of collective agreements than countries with enterprise bargaining. Research by the OECD, ILO and the European Commission has also linked sectoral bargaining to higher real wages, lower unemployment, fewer strikes and greater wage equality.

== European Union ==
In the EU, countries that have sectoral collective bargaining have significantly higher rates of coverage than those with enterprise or individual workplace bargaining. Under the Adequate Wage Directive 2022 article 4, a member state with collective bargaining coverage under 80% will be required to make an "action plan" to achieve 80% coverage.

Collective agreement coverage by country in 2015
Country	Coverage in 2015	System
France	98%	Sector
Belgium	96%	Sector (and national)
Austria	95%	Sector
Finland	91%	Sector (and national)
Portugal	89%	Sector
Sweden	89%	Sector (and national)
Netherlands	84%	Sector (but also enterprise)
Denmark	80%	Sector (but also enterprise)
Italy	80%	Sector
Norway	73%	Sector (and national)
Spain	69%	Sector (but also enterprise)
Slovenia	65%	Sector
Croatia	61%	Sector
Malta	61%	Enterprise
Luxembourg	59%	Sector and enterprise
Germany	59%	Sector and enterprise
Ireland	44%	Enterprise
Czech Republic	38%	Enterprise (some sector)
Romania	36%	Enterprise
Slovakia	35%	Enterprise
Latvia	34%	Enterprise
Estonia	33%	Enterprise
Hungary	31%	Enterprise (some sector)
Bulgaria	29%	Enterprise
United Kingdom	29%	Enterprise (some sector)
Poland	18%	Enterprise
Greece	10%	Enterprise
Lithuania	no data%	Enterprise, some sector

In 2019, the OECD's estimates for the percentage of collective bargaining coverage was somewhat changed. Collective bargaining coverage has generally fallen across EU member states, and most substantially in Greece, Romania, Slovakia, Germany and Slovenia, though policies to raise coverage have been implemented including (1) better employer organisation, (2) tying public procurement to collective agreements—as in half of German states by 2021—and (3) encouraging more union members.

The action plans of member states were mostly submitted in December 2025, according to the Directive, and made available by the ETUC, however Spain, Germany, Bulgaria and Hungary's plans were missing.

== United Kingdom ==
While sectoral bargaining used to be standard in the UK, enterprise bargaining was advocated by the 1968 report of the Royal Commission on Trade Unions and Employers' Associations chaired by Lord Donovan.

== United States ==
Sectoral bargaining was promoted by the National Industrial Recovery Act of 1933, but struck down and replaced by enterprise bargaining under the National Labor Relations Act of 1935. Today industries like screenwriting, hotels, and railroads still see sectoral bargaining predominate.

== Australia ==
Australia has a mixture of federal- and state-level sectoral awards, alongside enterprise bargaining. Awards are decided by application to a government or quasi-judicial tribunal, rather than via direct bargaining. Commonwealth "Modern Awards" and Enterprise Agreements are administered by the Fair Work Commission and the Fair Work Ombudsman. State awards were largely supplanted by federal ones following the Fair Work Act of 2009, those remaining are administered and arbitrated by bodies such as the Industrial Relations Commission of NSW, the South Australian Employment Tribunal, and the Western Australian Industrial Relations Commission.

== See also ==
- A Manifesto for Labour Law
- US labor law
- UK labour law
- German labour law
