= Mondelez v AMWU =

2020 judgment of the High Court of Australia

- Court: High Court of Australia
- Full case name: Mondelez Australia Pty Ltd v Automotive, Food, Metals, Engineering, Printing and Kindred Industries Union [2020] HCA 29

Case history
- Appealed from: Mondelez v AMWU [2019] FCAFC 138

Court membership
- Judges sitting: Kiefel CJ, Gageler, Nettle, Gordon and Edelman JJ

Mondelez v AMWU is a 2020 decision of the High Court of Australia involving the appeal of a decision by the Federal Court of Australia regarding personal leave, an entitlement used when an employee is sick and not able to work. A subsidiary of Mondelez International, Mondelez Australia, operates a chocolate factory in Claremont, Tasmania. Employees of the chocolate factory work under a collective bargaining agreement. The relevant agreement outlines employment terms and conditions, stipulating a 36-hour work week averaged over a four-week cycle, with three 12-hour shifts worked weekly for shift workers.

Per the agreement, all employees were entitled to 96 hours of paid personal leave each year. However, a dispute arose when the Fair Work Commission ruled that employees working 12-hour shifts should receive 120 hours of personal leave per year. Mondelez would deduct 12 hours of personal leave from the balance of an employee who used the entitlement in lieu of working a 12-hour shift, meaning that an employee in this circumstance would receive 96 hours, or eight "notional" days of personal leave per year. Two employees, represented by the Australian Manufacturing Workers Union, challenged Mondelez's practice of paying them only 96 hours of personal leave per year, arguing an entitlement to 10 working days of leave totalling 120 hours per year in line with the Fair Work Commission decision. The Federal Court of Australia was tasked with defining what constitutes a "day" in the context of personal leave entitlements under the National Employment Standards.

Mondelez asserted that the National Employment Standards interpreted 10 "notional" days as the equivalent of 7.2 hours per week when dividing by the 36-hour weekly work hours. The Australian Manufacturing Workers argued a "day" should be seen as a unit of hours worked on a day. The Federal Court of Australia ruled in favour of the Australian Manufacturing Workers. Mondelez and the Australian government appealed to the High Court of Australia, which overturned the Federal Court of Australia's decision. The High Court of Australia determined personal leave accrues at a rate of 1/26 of annual working hours for all employees, regardless of their work schedule, resulting in proportionate leave entitlements. This ruling was in alignment with industry practice and provided clarity regarding personal leave entitlements for employees with non-standard shift arrangements.

== Background ==
Mondelez Australia, a subsidiary of Mondelez International, operates a chocolate factory in Claremont, Tasmania. Its employees are engaged under a collective bargaining agreement (Agreement). Such an agreement is the result of a voluntary process of collective bargaining, which establishes the terms and conditions of employment for workers in an organisation. In this instance, employees were covered by an Agreement that stipulated their working week to be 36 hours, averaged across a four-week cycle. These hours were worked in 12-hour shifts.

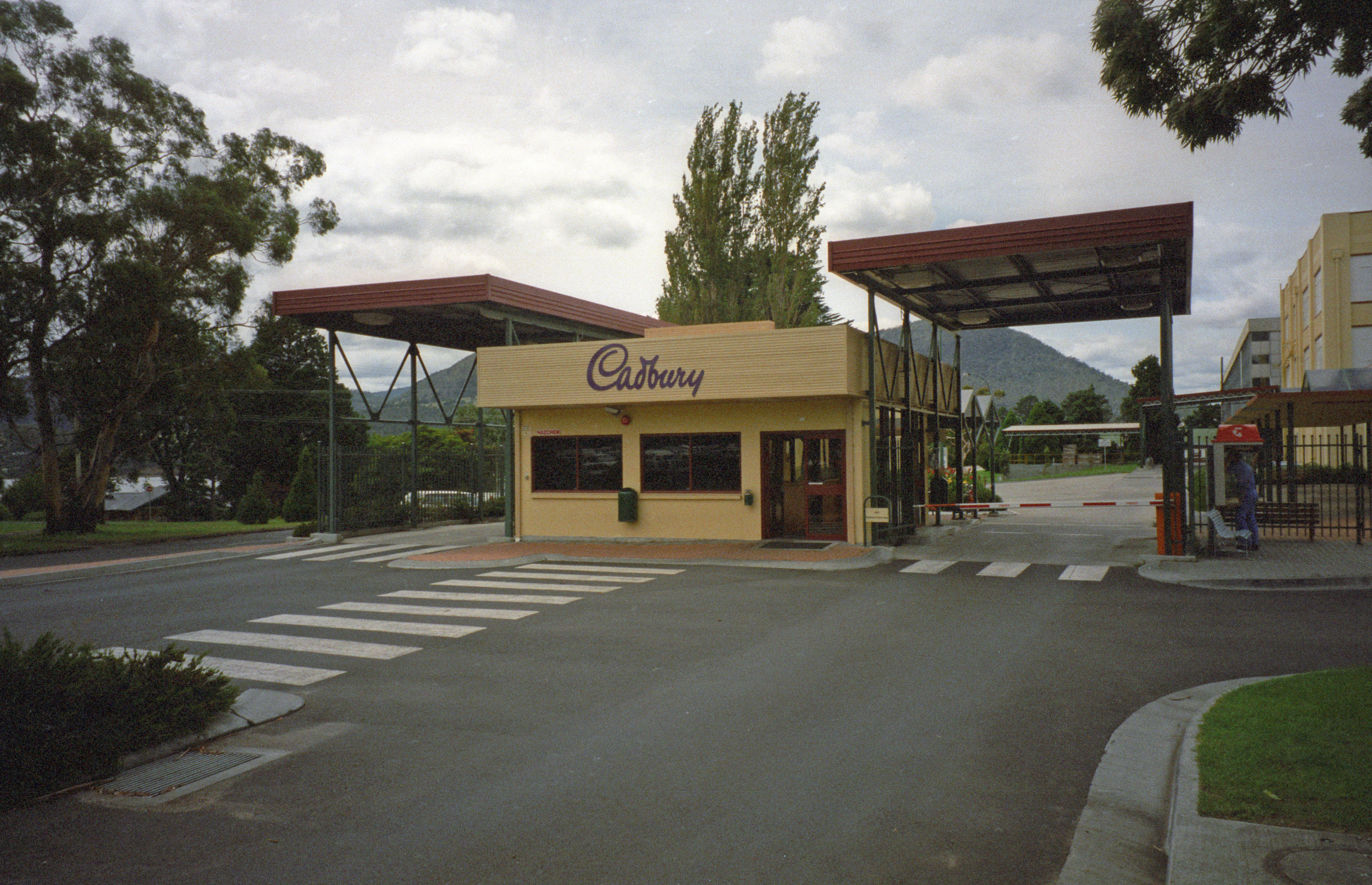
Factory entrance on Cadbury Road

Australia has a set of National Employment Standards (NES) that entitle workers to 10 days of personal leave per year, allowing an employee to receive payment for their usual working day when sick and unable to work. Some employees under the Agreement worked three 12-hour shifts per week and were provided with 96 hours of paid personal leave for each year worked. Mondelez would deduct 12 hours of personal leave from the balance of an employee who used the entitlement in lieu of working a 12-hour shift, meaning that an employee in this circumstance would receive eight days of personal leave per year.

Australia's workplace relations tribunal, the Fair Work Commission (FWC), had in 2018 ruled on a collective bargaining agreement for employees of AstraZeneca that workers completing 12-hour shifts should receive 120 hours of personal leave per year. Two employees represented by the Australian Manufacturing Workers Union (AMWU) worked 12-hour shifts and contended the Agreement did not comply with the NES and they should be paid 120 hours of leave per year.

Mondelez Australia then used the conditions of the Agreement in place at the chocolate factory to argue the AstraZeneca decision of the FWC should be overturned.

== Federal Court Case ==
The case before the Federal Court required it to consider what constitutes a "day" when considering the NES entitlement of 10 days of personal leave per year. The AMWU argued a "day" should be seen as a unit of hours worked on a day. Mondelez argued that the NES referred to 10 "notional" days for the entitlement to personal leave, implying that when dividing 36 weekly work hours by five, an employee would work a notional day of 7.2 hours per week.

Mondelez further argued that this meant the 96 hours of personal leave paid annually to employees under the Agreement exceeded the 72 hours (10 days at 7.2 hours) of personal leave provided for by the NES. Mondelez told the Federal Court that if the 10-day per year entitlement was viewed in 'calendar' days, this would provide workers completing 12-hour shifts with 120 hours of leave. The company´s argument was supported by then Industrial Relations Minister Craig Laundy.

The Federal Court ruled in favour of the argument put forward by the AMWU that if employees worked 12-hour shifts, their 10 days of personal leave should be paid at 12 hours a day as their leave would be exhausted sooner than those working standard days. The majority of justices found there were differences in the quantum of leave accrued by workers, depending on the structure of their working week. Justice Mordy Bromberg and Justice Darryl Rangiah stated:

When [a worker] take[s] paid personal/carer's leave for a single 12-hour shift, Mondelez deducts 12 hours from their accrued paid personal/carer's leave balance ... On this approach, over the course of one year of service, [such an employee] accrue[s] a quantum of paid personal/carer's leave that is sufficient to cover absence for eight 12-hour shifts.

This meant the 10 days of personal leave provided for in the NES constituted 10 portions of a 24-hour period that "would otherwise be allotted to work". Justice David O'Callaghan dissented from his colleagues. Legislators provided instances of personal leave when they enacted the entitlement, and he said this interpretation contradicted those instances:

Those examples, in my respectful view, reinforce the expression of the determination of Parliament that the amount of personal/carer's leave to be accrued is not to be affected by any different spread of an employee's ordinary hours of work in a week, and is designed to achieve what senior counsel for the applicant, correctly in my view, described as 'equity as between different classes of employees' ... In my view, the position advanced by the [unions] produces an outcome that creates inequities between different classes of employees that Parliament did not intend.

The Federal Court decision was welcomed by the AMWU, with its secretary stating: "Companies get massive benefits from workers working 12-hour shifts ... instead of having three lots of workers working eight [hour shifts], they have two lots of workers working 12 hour [shifts]". The Australian Industry Group, an organisation advocating for employers, and speaking on behalf of Mondelez, stated the judgment was "inconsistent with widespread industry practice" and would leave employers facing increased costs.

== Appeal to the High Court of Australia ==
Mondelez Australia and the Australian Government both appealed to the High Court to reverse the ruling of the Federal Court. The High Court ruled that personal leave constitutes an entitlement of two typical five-day working weeks, meaning that workers at the chocolate factory completing only three 12-hour shifts a week would be entitled to six 12-hour shifts to be taken as personal leave per year. The majority of the High Court stated:

One 'day' refers to a 'notional day' consisting of one-tenth of the equivalent of an employee's ordinary hours of work in a two-week period ... because patterns of work do not always follow two-week cycles, the entitlement to '10 days' of paid personal/carer's leave can be calculated as 1/26 of an employee's ordinary hours of work in a year.

In a joint judgment, Chief Justice Susan Kiefel along with Justice Geoffrey Nettle and Justice Michelle Gordon, favoured the argument of Mondelez that the NES entitlement was to 10 "notional" days of personal leave per year for three separate reasons. Justice James Edelman provided a similar but separate judgment.

First, the majority noted that legislation favoured a "notional" day interpretation of the entitlement, and the joint judgment found that the AMWU's interpretation of "day" discouraged flexible working, which is an objective of the national workplace relations law.

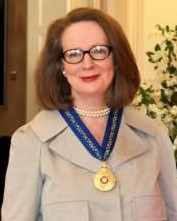
The decision was led by Chief Justice Susan Kiefel.

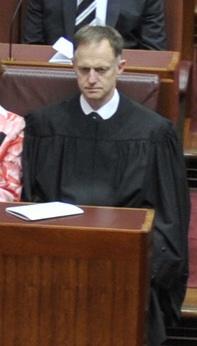
Justice Stephen Gageler was the sole dissenter

Second, the majority referred to a parliamentary document explaining the intention of the entitlement, noting that it describes personal leave with reference to the ordinary hours worked by employees.

Third, the majority considered the legislative history behind the underpinning legislation, which also supported the interpretation of a "notional" day. Justice Stephen Gageler dissented from his colleagues, finding no reason to contradict the ruling of the Federal Court. He considered that construing the entitlement as 10 "notional" days went beyond what was written in the legislation.

The ruling has the resulinonal leave accrues baingd on the hours worked at a rate of 1/26 for all employees. Such leave is subtracted from their overall balance of entitlement on the basis of the hours taken as leave. This means completing a 38-hour work week entitles an employee to 76 hours of personal leave for each year worked. Working fewer hours would result in a proportional reduction in personal leave hours owed. So, an employee working 24 hours per week would receive 48 hours per year of personal leave. The ruling was consistent with the previous advice provided to employers by the Fair Work Ombudsman that employers need only pay employees for 7.2 hours of personal leave when taken on a day when a 12-hour shift is ordinarily worked.

The Australian Industry Group said the judgment was consistent with industry practice. The AMWU considered the decision a "huge blow" and called for the legislation of 10 days of paid personal leave based on hours otherwise worked. Mondelez responded to the decision by stating that it would "provide certainty for all Australian employers with non-standard shift arrangements".

== Bibliography ==
Literature

- De Flamingh, Jack; Hogan, Alannah (2019). "A day in the life: Federal court takes personal leave back to basics". Law Society of NSW Journal. 60: 74–75 – via InfoRMIT.
- De Flamingh, Jack; Lynch, Andy (2020). "High Court clear as day on "notional" day in the life". Law Society of NSW Journal. 71: 82–83 – via InfoRMIT.
- Goodyear, Benjamin (2020). "Like sands through the hourglass ... in Mondelez Australia Pty Ltd v The Australian Manufacturing Workers Union". Journal of the NSW Bar Association. 16 (4): 20.
- Humphries, Lyndall (2020). "Clarity on personal/carer's leave". NSW Doctor. 12 (5): 24–25 – via InfoRMIT.
- International Labour Organization (2012). "Q&As on business and collective bargaining". www.ilo.org.
- Sharpe, Michelle (2020). "High Court Judgments". Brief. 47 (7): 46–47 – via InfoRMIT.

News articles

- Bevin, Edith (13 August 2020). "High Court rules against union bid for more paid sick leave for shift workers". ABC News.
- Hannan, Ewin (13 December 2019b). "Appeal bid win for Mondelez over Cadbury shift workers". The Australian. Archived from the original on 13 December 2019.
- Hannan, Ewin (21 August 2019a). "Workers get choccies in Cadbury challenge". The Australian.
- Holmes, Adam (22 August 2019). "What's in a 'working day'? Cadbury loses in Federal Court over personal leave at Tasmanian site". The Canberra Times.
- Humphries, Alexandra (22 August 2019). "Sick leave win for Cadbury shift workers could flow on across Australian workplaces". ABC News.
- Lohberger, Loretta (22 August 2019). "Two Tasmanian Cadbury workers successfully argue against company's sick leave calculation method". The Mercury.
- Marin-Guzman, David (21 August 2019). "Employers facing back-pay bill over sick leave". Financial Review.
- McCauley, Dana (16 September 2019). "Morrison government takes sick leave case to the High Court". The Age.
- Patty, Anna (14 August 2018). "More than a million workers 'short-changed' on sick leave". The Sydney Morning Herald.
- Pelly, Michael (13 August 2020). "Employers win $2 billion case on personal leave". Financial Review.
