= Unfair dismissal in Australia =

Unlawful act of employment act in Australia

Unfair dismissal in Australia is the right to not be unfairly dismissed from work in the Fair Work Act 2009. This is a core part of Australian labour law, and refers to an unlawful act of employment termination due to it being an unfair action on the employee by the employer.

== History ==
The ability for an individual to seek relief from unfair dismissal was first established in a statutory scheme in South Australia in 1972, followed thereafter by Western Australia, Queensland, New South Wales and Victoria in the early 1990s.

Protection from unfair dismissal at the Commonwealth level was enhanced in 1984 by the Commonwealth Conciliation and Arbitration Commission with its ruling in the Termination, Change and Redundancy Case, that awards should contain a provision that dismissal "shall not be harsh, unjust or unreasonable" and subsequent awards following it were upheld by the High Court of Australia. The Parliament of Australia later extended the reach of protection from unfair dismissal with the passage of the Industrial Relations Reform Act 1993, which relied upon the external affairs power and the ILO Termination of Employment Convention, 1982. The succeeding Howard government introduced Workplace Relations Act 1996, known as the Reith reforms, followed by the more controversial WorkChoices legislation in 2006, which was seen as a substantial backsliding of employee rights and was abolished by the Rudd government's Fair Work Act in 2009.

== Contemporary law ==
=== Commonwealth jurisdiction ===
==== Unfair dismissal findings ====
Unfair dismissal will be found to have occurred where the Fair Work Commission, acting under section 385 of the Fair Work Act 2009, determines that:

1. a person has been dismissed;
2. the dismissal was harsh, unjust or unreasonable;
3. it was not consistent with the Small Business Fair Dismissal Code; and
4. it was not a case of genuine redundancy.

If the Fair Work Commission determines that a dismissal was unfair, the Commission must decide whether to order reinstatement or compensation. The Commission is required to first consider whether reinstatement is appropriate and can only order compensation (capped at 6 months pay) if it is satisfied that reinstatement is inappropriate.

==== Coverage ====
In general, people covered by unfair dismissal laws are those who have worked more than six months for an employer (or more than one year for a small business employer), for which one or more or the following conditions must apply:

1. a modern award covers the person;
2. an enterprise agreement applies to the person in relation to the employment;
3. the person's annual rate of earnings is determined to be less than the high income threshold.

The scope of coverage is quite broad. The Commonwealth has declared that all employers falling within its jurisdiction are subject to the scheme, including:

- The Commonwealth and its authorities
- Those corporations falling within its corporations power
- Those who hire waterside employees, maritime employees, and flight crew officers in interstate or overseas trade or commerce
- All employers in the Australian Capital Territory and the Northern Territory (except for members of the Northern Territory Police), as well as the external territories of Norfolk Island, Christmas Island and the Cocos (Keeling) Islands

In addition, the States have delegated certain classes of employers by virtue of the Constitution's referral power:

Classes of referred employers, by State
Class	(New South Wales) NSW	(Queensland) QLD	(South Australia) SA	(Tasmania) TAS	(Victoria (state)) VIC	(Western Australia) WA
Private employers (Note: which are not already regulated as constitutional corporations)	✓	✓	✓	✓	✓	
State government employers					✓ (Note: except for law enforcement officials and executives in the public sector)	
Local government employers				✓	✓	

=== State jurisdiction ===
Where the Fair Work Act does not apply, relief from unfair dismissal may arise under State laws. In Western Australia, recourse may be available from the Western Australian Industrial Relations Commission.

== See also ==
- Wrongful dismissal
