= Fair Work Ombudsman v Quest South Perth =

2015 judgment of the High Court of Australia

- Court: High Court of Australia
- Full case name: Fair Work Ombudsman v Quest South Perth Holdings Pty Ltd & Ors
- Argued: 4 November 2015
- Decided: 2 December 2015
- Citations: [2015] HCA 45, (2015) 256 CLR 137
- Transcript: [2015] HCATrans 285

Case history
- Prior actions: Fair Work Ombudsman v Quest South Perth Holdings Pty Ltd (No 2) [2013] FCA 582; Fair Work Ombudsman v Quest South Perth Holdings Pty Ltd [2015] FCAFC 37
- Subsequent action: Fair Work Ombudsman v Quest South Perth Holdings Pty Ltd (No 4) [2017] FCA 680

Court membership
- Judges sitting: French CJ, Kiefel, Bell, Gageler, and Nettle JJ.

Fair Work Ombudsman v Quest South Perth is a 2015 decision of the High Court of Australia. Quest, a company operating serviced apartment hotels across Australia, used a company to change the employment status of two housekeepers and a receptionist from employees to independent contractors at its South Perth site. They would then no longer be owed the minimum workplace entitlements owed to employees in Australia. The Fair Work Ombudsman, an authority responsible for enforcing Australian workplace laws, initiated proceedings against Quest South Perth in the Federal Court of Australia.

The Fair Work Ombudsman alleged the conversion breached section 357 of the Fair Work Act 2009. This section prohibits employers from misrepresenting employment as an independent contracting arrangement. The Full Bench of the Federal Court of Australia found Quest South Perth had not contravened section 357 because it had used a third party to convert the employees to independent contractors. The Fair Work Ombudsman then appealed that finding to the High Court of Australia, asking it to find whether an employer can avoid contravening section 357 by introducing a third-party labour hire company into an agreement between itself and its employee. The High Court of Australia found that Quest South Perth had contravened section 357 of the Fair Work Act 2009.

== Background ==
Section 357 of the Fair Work Act 2009 (the Act) prohibits an employer from misrepresenting employment as an independent contracting arrangement.

Quest is a company that operates serviced apartments at sites across Australia. Quest South Perth was one such site, and it employed two housekeepers and a receptionist who were paid an hourly rate. Quest held meetings with a third-party labour hire company, which told Quest it could "convert" the employees to independent contractors, with the benefit of this being that they would be no longer entitled to most of the protections, rights, and conditions of Australian labour laws. This would include the provisions within the National Employment Standards, a set of eleven minimum entitlements for employees in Australia, in addition to the minimum wage.

The contracting company held meetings with the three employees and pressured them to become independent contractors, stating that it would be advantageous, without disclosing the disadvantages of losing their workplace rights. The employees signed an agreement to work as independent contractors. The Fair Work Ombudsman then initiated proceedings alleging Quest South Perth had breached section 357 of the Act.

== Federal Court cases ==
First Federal Court decision

The case commenced at the Federal Court of Australia before Justice McKerracher. The Ombudsman argued two misrepresentations had been made: that the employees were dismissed only to be re-employed doing the same role as independent contractors, or that this is what was represented to the individuals when in fact they were employees. Both arguments, if proven, constituted a breach of section 357 of the Act. Justice McKerracher dismissed the first argument, finding the workers consciously decided to convert from employee to independent contractor. On the second argument, Justice McKerracher found the Ombudsman was unable to prove the workers had remained employees.

Appeal to the Full Federal Court

The Ombudsman appealed to the Full Court of the Federal Court, which was dismissed. Justices North and Bromberg observed that "when determining whether a relationship is one of employment", it is necessary "to ensure that form and presentation do not distract the Court from identifying the substance of what has been truly agreed". The decision constituted a way of avoiding a breach of section 357 of the Act by involving a third-party labour hire company.

== Appeal to the High Court of Australia ==
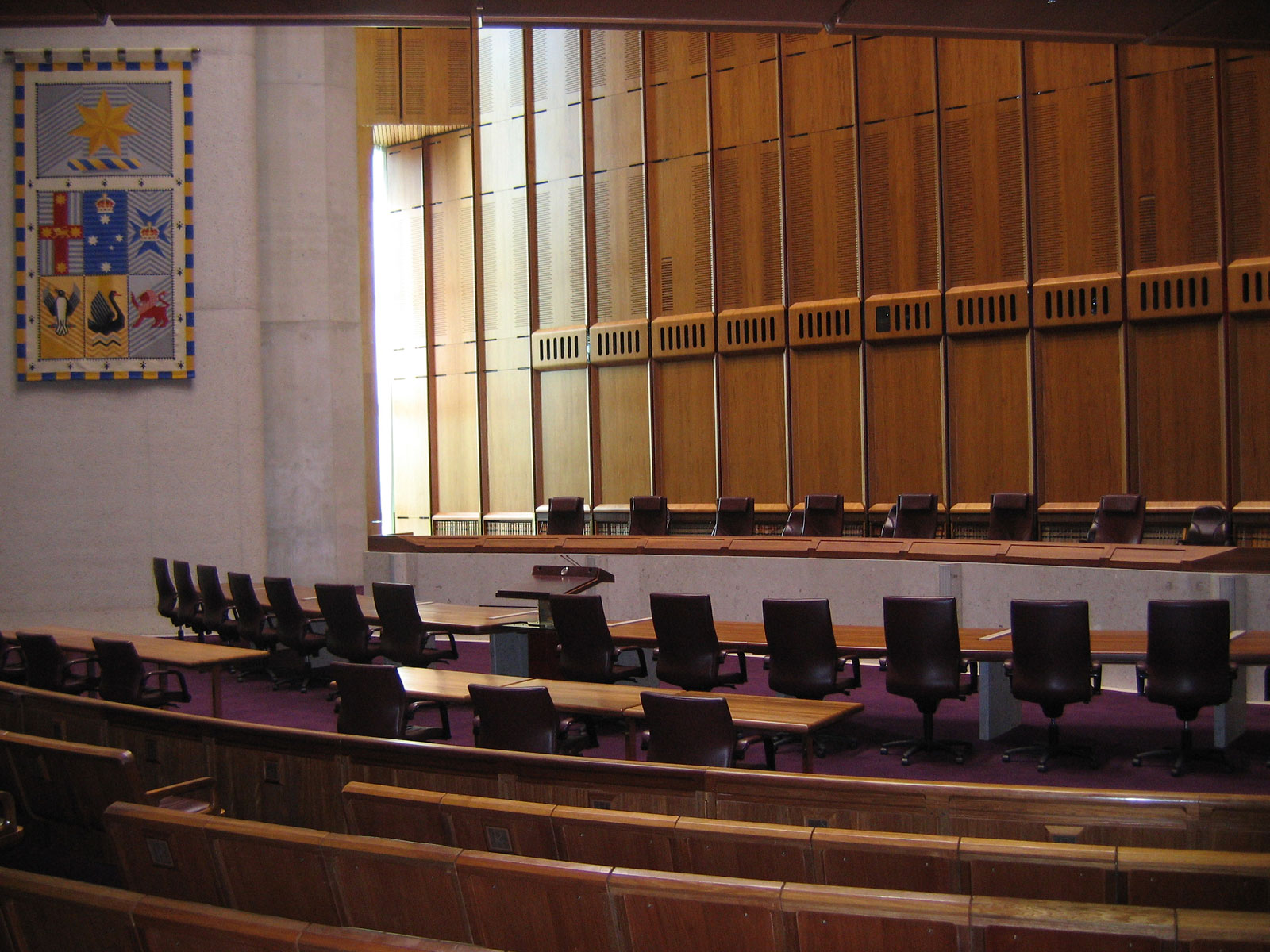
The High Court of Australia

The Ombudsman then appealed the Full Federal Court's decision to the High Court of Australia, with the appeal posing a key issue: whether an employer could avoid contravening section 357 of the Act by introducing a third-party labour hire company into an agreement between itself and its employee. The High Court, in summary, held an employer could not.

The High Court held that the Full Federal Court had interpreted section 357 of the Act with a narrow construction not supported by its text and that the section prevents an employer from misrepresenting to an employee that they work for a third party. The High Court ruling means it is unlawful to use a third party to disguise a true employment relationship.

In a joint judgment, the High Court majority consisting of Chief Justice French and Justices Kiefel, Bell, Gageler, and Nettle found that Quest's attempt to "convert" the employees to independent contractor status constituted a breach of section 357 of the Act and that "Who might be the counterparty to the represented contract for services, and whether that counterparty might be a real or fictional entity, is correspondingly immaterial to the operation of the provision".

== Bibliography ==
Literature

- Bomball, Pauline (2019). "Statutory Norms and Common Law Concepts in the Characterisation of Contracts for the Performance of Work". Melbourne University Law Review. 42 (2): 370–405 – via AustLii.
- Kelly, Caroline (2016). "Sham Arrangements, Third Parties and S 357 of the Fair Work Act 2009: Fair Work Ombudsman v Quest South Perth Holdings Pty Ltd [2015] HCA 45". Australian Journal of Labour Law. 29: 110–120. SSRN 3232474 – via SSRN.
- Dawson, Michelle (2015). "High Court to determine whether the Full Federal Court applied too narrow a construction of the sham contracting provision in Fair Work Ombudsman v Quest South Perth Holdings Pty Ltd". Employment Law Bulletin. 21 (7): 82–83 – via LexisNexis.
- Dawson, Michelle (2016). "High Court finds Full Federal Court's construction of the sham contracting provision in Fair Work Ombudsman v Quest South Perth Holdings Pty Ltd too narrow". Employment Law Bulletin. 22 (1): 142–143 – via LexisNexis.
- Pittard, Marilyn (2015). "Independent contractor versus employee: a question of legal approach?". Employment Law Bulletin. 22 (1): 142–143 – via LexisNexis.

News articles

- Waters, Cara (3 December 2015). "High Court finds Quest engaged in sham contracting 'mischief'". The Sydney Morning Herald.
- Pelly, Michael; Marin-Guzman, David (12 August 2021). "High Court's scorecard shows it smiles on employers". Australian Financial Review.
