= Australian workplace agreement =

An Australian workplace agreement (AWA) was a type of formalised individual agreement negotiated between an employer and employee in Australia that existed from 1996 to 2009. Employers could offer a "take it or leave it" AWA as a condition of employment. They were registered by the Employment Advocate and did not require a dispute resolution procedure. These agreements operated only at the federal level. AWAs were individual written agreements concerning terms and conditions of employment between an employer and employee in Australia, under the Workplace Relations Act 1996. An AWA could override employment conditions in state or territory laws except those relating to occupational health and safety, workers' compensation, or training arrangements. An AWA was required to meet only the most minimal Australian Fair Pay and Conditions Standard. Agreements were not required to include effective dispute resolution procedures, and could not include prohibited content. Agreements were for a maximum of five years; approved, promoted and registered by the Workplace Authority; operated to the exclusion of any award; and prohibited industrial action regarding details in the agreement for the life of the agreement. The introduction of AWAs was a very controversial industrial relations issue in Australia.

During a Senate Estimates hearing on 29 May 2006, Peter McIlwain, Head of the Office of the Employment Advocate detailed that from a sample of 4 per cent, or 250, of the total 6,263 AWAs lodged during April 2006 after WorkChoices was introduced, that: 100% removed at least one protected Award condition; 64% removed annual leave loadings; 63% stripped out penalty rates; 52% cut out shift loadings; 40% dropped gazetted public holidays; and 16% slashed all award conditions and only the Government's five minimum conditions were satisfied.[6]

New AWAs were banned under the Fair Work Act 2009.

== Coverage ==
As of May 2004, AWAs had achieved coverage of about 2.4% of the workforce. Mining companies pushed the agreements with some success, offering substantial increases in pay to workers who chose to sign an AWA.

According to OEA statistics, as of 31 December 2004, 1,410,900 persons were covered under Union Certified Agreements, 168,500 under non-union Certified Agreements, and 421,800, or over 21%, were covered by AWAs. By 31 December 2005 this had risen to 1,618,200 under Union Certified Agreements, 185,300 under non-union Certified Agreements, and 538,200 Australian Workplace Agreements. Australian Bureau of Statistics figures published in March 2005 showed hourly wages of workers on AWAs were two percent lower than the hourly wages of workers on registered collective agreements, mostly negotiated by unions. For women, AWAs paid 11% less per hour than collective agreements.

The most common methods of setting pay for all employees were registered collective agreement (38.3%), unregistered individual arrangement (31.2%) and award only (20.0%). Unregistered collective agreement (2.6%) and registered individual agreement (2.4%) were the least common methods of setting pay. The remaining 5.4% of employees were working proprietors of incorporated businesses.

In the federal public service the Department of Employment and Workplace Relations reported that as of 31 December 2004, out of 124,500 public and parliamentary service permanent staff, there were 11,085 AWAs (covering 1928 Senior Executive Service (SES), where AWAs are compulsory, and 9,157 other employees). The rest of the permanent staff were covered, as at 30 March 2005, by 101 certified agreements, of which 70 were union enterprise agreements and 31 non-union enterprise agreements.

According to a report in The Australian newspaper in March 2007, about five per cent of the total workforce were at that time employed on AWAs, with about 32 per cent of miners employed on AWAs, but this figure was much higher in Western Australia where up to 52 per cent were on AWAs. Rio Tinto pioneered individual employment contacts under the common law in the 1980s in Western Australia with productivity improvements of between 20 and 35 per cent, according to Rio Tinto managing director Charlie Lenegan.

== Opposing views ==
The union movement saw AWAs as an attempt to undermine the collective bargaining power of trade unions in the negotiation of pay and conditions of their members. Unions argued that the ordinary working person has little to no bargaining power by themselves to effectively negotiate an agreement with an employer, hence there is inherently unequal bargaining power for the contract. For exceptional individuals in a workplace, or industries with a labour shortage, the union movement argues that common law contracts are sufficient. They also believe that while commercial law and common law provides for fairness and equality of bargaining power, AWAs were designed to entrench inequality between an employer and their workforce with regard to pay and conditions. The policy of the ACTU was that AWAs should be abolished and that the bargaining system should contain collective bargaining rights.

Most unions warned their members to be very cautious about signing AWAs, and if they did so, to appoint the union as their bargaining agent. For example, the Australian Services Union warned members:

AWAs are about one thing: tipping the balance of power more firmly towards your employer and away from you.

In the Western Australian Parliament in May 2005, the Labor Minister for Consumer and Employment Protection stated his belief that AWAs were being used to reduce wages and conditions of employment in Western Australia.

The Howard Government and most business groups maintained that AWAs were mutually beneficial for employers and employees, often promoting the view that 'flexibility' is paramount:

AWAs give employers and employees flexibility in setting wages and conditions, and enable them to agree on arrangements that suit their workplaces and individual preferences. AWAs offer an employer and employees the opportunity to make an agreement that best suits the specific needs of individual employees. An existing employee cannot be forced to sign an AWA.

In April 2007 The Sydney Morning Herald reported that it had received unpublished Government spreadsheets that showed 27.8% of the agreements had stripped away conditions that were intended to be protected by law. The spreadsheets were based on a sample of AWA agreements.

In response to ongoing criticisms of WorkChoices and AWAs, then-Prime Minister John Howard announced the introduction of a new "fairness test" with an advertising campaign in May 2007 targeting women and youth which did not mention specifically either WorkChoices or AWAs. However, the changes were not retrospective, leaving tens of thousands of workers on contracts that have removed conditions without the compensation that would be required under the current test. Howard stated:

Can I just say that it was never intentional that it should become the norm that penalty rates and overtime loadings should be traded off without proper compensation. The fairness test will guarantee in a very simple way that will not occur.

On 19 March 2008, a bill was passed in the Senate that prevented new AWAs from being made, and set up provisions for workers to be transferred from AWAs into intermediate agreements.

== See also ==
- Australian Council of Trade Unions
- Australian Fair Pay and Conditions Standard
- 2007 Australian federal election
- Australian Industrial Relations Commission
- Australian labour movement
- WorkChoices
