= Industrial relations commission =

Government courts or tribunals

An industrial relations commission generally refers to bodies created by the governments of the Australian states or the Commonwealth to adjudicate employment related matters such as disputes or determining wages and conditions. Under the Australian constitution industrial commissions at the Commonwealth (federal) level are branches of the executive government and not courts, although at state level, commissions may also sit as courts.

== Current industrial commissions ==
Level	Name	Sectors	Ref
Commonwealth (federal)	Fair Work Commission	Public sectors of the Commonwealth, the Territories* and Victoria, local government of Tasmania, private sector corporations at all levels	
New South Wales	Industrial Relations Commission of New South Wales	State public sector and local government	
Queensland	Queensland Industrial Relations Commission	State public sector and local government	
South Australia	South Australian Employment Tribunal	State public sector and local government, private sector employees not employed by a corporation	
Tasmania	Tasmanian Industrial Commission	State public sector	
Victoria	None	Other than law enforcement and higher level state sector employees, Fair Work Commission covers employees	
Western Australia	Western Australia Industrial Relations Commission	State public sector and local government, private sector employees not employed by a corporation and, if the parties agree, mediate if a corporation	
		Note: Law enforcement in the Northern Territory not covered by the Fair Work Commission	

== Previous industrial commissions ==
Level	Name	Years of operation	Ref
Commonwealth	Australian Industrial Relations Commission	1989−2010	
Commonwealth	Australian Conciliation and Arbitration Commission	1973−1989	
Commonwealth	Commonwealth Conciliation and Arbitration Commission	1956−1973	
Commonwealth	Australian Fair Pay Commission	2006−2009	
