= Iain Ross (judge) =

Australian Judge

The Honourable Iain Ross AO

Judge of the Federal Court of Australia
- In office 1 March 2012 – 18 November 2022

President of the Fair Work Commission
- In office 1 March 2012 – 18 November 2022
- Preceded by: Geoffrey Giudice
- Succeeded by: Adam Hatcher

Personal details
- Education: University of Sydney
- Occupation: Judge

Iain James Kerr Ross AO is a retired Australian jurist. who served as a judge of the Federal Court of Australia from 1 March 2012 to 18 November 2022, as well as president of the Australian Fair Work Commission during the same period. He previously served as a judge of the Supreme Court of Victoria between 2009 and 2012.

== Early life and education ==
Iain James Kerr Ross emigrated from Scotland to Sydney when he was six months old.

He attended Caringbah High School in Sydney. Ross then went on to graduate from the University of Sydney with a Bachelor of Economics in 1981, a Bachelor of Laws and Master of Laws in 1983 and 1987 respectively, and a Doctor of Philosophy in law in 2001. His doctoral thesis was supervised by Ron McCallum.

Ross also holds a Master of Business Administration from Monash University.

== Career ==
=== Law and industrial relations ===
Ross was admitted as a barrister of the New South Wales Supreme Court in May 1985. In 1986 he moved to Melbourne to work as an industrial officer of the Australian Council of Trade Unions, and was a leader in establishing occupational health and safety standards. He was elected assistant secretary of the ACTU, serving under Bill Kelty. In December 1988 he was admitted as a barrister and solicitor of the Victorian Supreme Court.

In 1994, aged 35, he was appointed a vice president of the former Australian Industrial Relations Commission, a role in which he served until 2006. Ross was a partner in the workplace relations group in Corrs Chambers Westgarth from February 2006 until November 2007, and served as a judge of the County Court of Victoria from 2007 to 2009.

In 2009, he was appointed a judge of the Supreme Court of Victoria, as well as the president of the Victorian Civil and Administrative Tribunal (VCAT) from 1 April 2010.

Ross was appointed judge of the Federal Court of Australia on 1 March 2012, and retired on 18 November 2022.

=== Academia ===
Since 1997, Ross has been a lecturer in the Faculty of Law at the University of Sydney, where he teaches units in its Master of Laws Program. He was appointed an adjunct professor in law in 2004, but is no longer in this role.

== Other roles and activities ==
Ross has also served as chair of the Council of Australasian Tribunals and inaugural chair of the Mediator Standards Board. He served as a Commissioner of the Victorian Law Reform Commission between 2003 and 2010.

On 23 March 2012 Ross succeeded Geoffrey Giudice as president of Fair Work Australia (which was renamed to the Fair Work Commission in January 2013).

In 2013, he delivered the Kingsley Laffer Memorial Lecture at the University of Sydney.

Ross was appointed a non-executive member of the board of the Reserve Bank of Australia on 7 May 2023; his term ends on 6 May 2028.

On 1 June 2024 Ross was appointed acting chair of the federal government's Net Zero Economy Agency, replacing outgoing chair Greg Combet. Once the legislation had passed parliament, Ross would become the inaugural chair of the agency.

On 1 October 2026 Ross was appointed as one of three expert commissioners to lead the Royal Commission into Artificial Intelligence established by the Government of South Australia.

== Recognition and honours ==
Ross was made an Officer of the Order of Australia in the Queen's Birthday Honours in June 2005, "for his services to industrial relations through contributions to institutional reform, particularly the development of a universal superannuation system and enterprise bargaining, and as a teacher and researcher in the field".

For his services to law, the University of Sydney conferred upon Ross an Honorary Doctor of Laws on 23 May 2014.

He was elected a Fellow of the Academy of the Social Sciences in Australia on 25 September 2019.

== Personal life ==
Ross married Sarah, and has children.

He is an accomplished horse-rider, a wine maker, and baker.
