= Workplace Authority =

Former Australian government agency

The Workplace Authority was an Australian Government statutory agency that existed from 1 July 2007 to 1 July 2009. It replaced and expanded the role of the Office of the Employment Advocate, which had existed since 1997. It was replaced by the Fair Work Ombudsman and Fair Work Australia (since renamed the Fair Work Commission).

The primary role of the Office of the Employment Advocate was to accept the lodgement of Australian workplace agreements. In March 2006 the Office's role expanded to include the lodgement of collective agreements.

The Workplace Relations Amendment (A Stronger Safety Net) Act 2007 received royal assent on 28 June 2007, establishing the Workplace Authority and introducing the Fairness Test, as part of the WorkChoices amendments to Australian labour law.

The Authority's director, Barbara Bennett, was responsible for assessing whether agreements lodged on or after 7 May 2007 passed the Fairness Test. However she also agreed to be the front of the Howard Government's WorkChoices advertising campaign in 2007 and received heavy criticism for her role. The Authority also received strong criticism concerning the enormous backlog of unassessed Workplace Agreements lodged after Bennett's appointment.

The Fairness Test was applied to Australian workplace agreements and collective agreements to ensure they provided fair compensation for the removal or modification of protected award conditions, such as penalty rates and overtime loadings.

The Authority could, upon request, carry out a pre-lodgement review of an agreement to assess whether it would pass the Fairness Test. Additionally, the Authority provided free support and advice to employers, particularly those in the small business sector, and employees, in the areas of agreement-making and lodgement of agreements, as well as advising on prohibited content and whether agreements met the minimum requirements as set in the Australian Fair Pay and Conditions Standard.

The Workplace Authority was located in Canberra, Sydney, Melbourne, Brisbane and Perth. It also operated a Workplace Infoline for workplace relations queries.
