= Royal Commission into Artificial Intelligence =

Royal Commission in South Australia

- Date: 1 October 2026 – present
- Location: South Australia, Australia
- Type: Royal commission
- Commissioners: Iain Ross (chair); Kate Pounder; Christopher Manning
- Final report due: 1 July 2027
- Website: www.royalcommissionai.sa.gov.au

The Royal Commission into Artificial Intelligence is a royal commission established by the Government of South Australia under Peter Malinauskas on 1 October 2026. Its focus is on the opportunities and risks posed by artificial intelligence (AI) to the South Australian economy and society, excluding the impact of data centres. Its report, due to be delivered no later than 1 July 2027, is expected to offer some concrete actions that can be implemented by government, the community, and businesses. Three commissioners have been appointed.

== Background ==
South Australia, under the premiership of Peter Malinauskas, was the first state in Australia to create the office of a Minister for Artificial Intelligence, and has also established the Office for Artificial Intelligence.

The main focus of the commission, as stated in an August 2026 announcement, was on formulating policy solutions to the risks and opportunities posed by AI. Malinauskas announced the inquiry not long after visiting the United States, where he had many discussions about AI, including with the leaders of Anthropic, OpenAI, and Apple. When asked whether such an inquiry would not be better handled by the federal government, Malinauskas praised the prime minister, Anthony Albanese, for having formed the federal Office of AI within his department and for his work asking for international cooperation at the UN Assembly recently, but said that the states had a responsibility to do their part in examining the technology, and that he wanted SA to be a leader in this area. He said that, as an example, one area of concern was the use of AI in schools: "We don’t want kids to finish school not knowing how to use AI, but similarly, we don't want them to finish school having had AI do their schooling for them".

== The commission ==
The royal commission, which is being run under the auspices of the state government's Office for Artificial Intelligence, commenced on 1 October 2026, with its final report due no later than 1 July 2027. Three commissioners were appointed to lead the commission: Iain Ross, Kate Pounder, and Christopher Manning.

Iain Ross is a former Federal Court of Australia judge and former chair of the Fair Work Commission. Kate Pounder is the CEO of the Tech Council of Australia, a body representing a number of technology companies, founded in 2021 by 25 companies, including Afterpay, Atlassian, and Google Australia. She is also chair of RNA Australia, and was a co-founder of economics advisory firm AlphaBeta, along with Andrew Charlton, the federal Assistant Minister for Science, Technology and the Digital Economy. Christopher Manning is an expert in AI, and as of 2026 the inaugural Thomas M. Siebel Professor in Machine Learning. Pounder said that the commission is "a world-leading opportunity to define what AI can deliver".

The commission is to look at the impact of AI on employment and workplace practices; how the state's education system should adapt to AI; how it may be used to streamline the regulatory processes for businesses; and how it could assist delivery of public services. Other focuses are data sovereignty, the state's control over AI systems data, and developments in other jurisdictions, both within Australia and abroad. The commissioners will need to take account of views of a variety of groups, including community representatives, industry bodies, unions, academics, creative industries, software developers, and various levels of government at home and internationally. The commission is expected to recommend some concrete actions for government, industry, and the community, for the short and longer-term future.

The scope excludes data centres and their impact on the use of electricity and water, as originally announced in August, although there is room to assess some of the broader infrastructure implications, with regard to its impact on the economy and other issues. Exclusions from the inquiry include issues that are regulated by the federal government, including cyber security, intellectual property, and critical infrastructure.

The Royal Commission will conduct forums and industry consultations, and will also be receiving submissions from technology companies, businesses, unions, academics, teachers, students, and other community members. It is expected to cost the government around A$3m.

=== Terms of reference ===
The inquiry is intended to cover opportunities and implications to the South Australian economy and society as a consequence of artificial intelligence. The stated terms of reference are as follows:

- The opportunities, barriers, and policy settings for AI to improve productivity, innovation and economic growth to enable South Australian industry to be nationally and globally competitive including where change can be transformative to the South Australian economy.
- How South Australia can leverage the social benefits of AI while safeguarding people and society from AI-related risks and challenges.
- The policy, legislative and regulatory frameworks required in South Australia to encourage the safe and responsible development, deployment, adoption and use of AI across industry, government, research and the community.
- The opportunities and challenges of AI on the labour market and workplace practices including mitigation of impacts on employment in South Australia.
- How the education system, including schools, higher and vocational education, should adapt to the expansion of AI.
- How AI can be used to simplify and streamline the regulatory environment for South Australian businesses.
- The opportunities and associated risks for South Australia in adoption of AI to improve quality and productivity of public services, including the health system.

== Significance and commentary ==
The RC is the first major public inquiry into AI in the nation. The Malinauskas government was also the first to announce that SA would be banning the use of social media for under-14s, which led to the Commonwealth legislation, Online Safety Amendment (Social Media Minimum Age) Act 2024, a ban for under-16s. British computer scientist Toby Walsh suggested that the findings of the Royal Commission may well be picked up by the federal government. University of Sydney computer science academic Rebecca Johnson expressed doubts about whether the commission would uncover any new risks, as these had been studied extensively already, but said that if it uncovered evidence that is inaccessible to most researchers, it could be useful.

Legal firm Piper Alderman has commented that it is a useful exercise for all organisations to review who is monitoring the use of AI in their organisation, regardless of whether they make a submission to the inquiry or not, and "AI governance is increasingly part of broader organisational risk management". They, along with several other legal and technical websites, note that the Terms of Reference have a particular focus on employment and workplace practices, as well as education of workers.

Surgeon, author, and filmmaker Samantha Pillay stressed the importance of looking at how AI influences health diagnoses and health policy: "Australia strictly limits commercial influence over health advice... Yet an algorithm can steer millions of health decisions at once, shaped by commercial interests the patient never sees, and no regulator can look inside it". She also notes "If the commission hears only from the people already using AI, it will be examining the wrong patient".

== See also ==
- Australian Institute for Machine Learning
- OpenAI rogue agent breach of Medicare
