= Common rule awards =

Common rule awards are a particular form of industrial award used in Australia to regulate minimum terms and conditions of employment. Awards are the end product of the processes of conciliation and arbitration where an industrial tribunal makes an award in settlement of an industrial dispute. Whereas awards are legally binding on all parties to the dispute which are named in the award, with common rule awards all employers in the industry or occupation covered by the award are bound by it.

Common rule awards were standard in Australia's state industrial relations systems and covered hundreds of thousands of employees and employers. It has long been held that the Australian parliament's conciliation and arbitration power, did not permit common rule awards in the Federal industrial relations system.

In 2003 Victoria referred powers to the Commonwealth, to provide for the Australian Industrial Relations Commission to make common rule awards for Victoria. This followed the abolition of State awards in 1996 by the Victorian Government which stripped more than 350,000 Victorian employees of their award conditions. The question of referral disappeared with the establishment of a national regime of workplace relations through the Workplace Relations Amendment (Work Choices) Act 2005 (Cth), which did not rely on the Australian parliament's conciliation and arbitration power instead being primarily founded on the corporations power.

WorkChoices was replaced by the Fair Work Act 2009, which was similarly founded on the corporations power and not the conciliation and arbitration power. In addition the Fair Work Act relied on a referral from most states under the referral power. The Fair Work Act established common rule awards called "Modern Awards" that are of general application and set out minimum terms and conditions for particular industries and occupations. As of May 2016 there were 122 modern awards of general application.
