= Jury duty =

Service as a juror in a legal proceeding

Jury duty or jury service is a service as a juror in a legal proceeding. Different countries have different approaches to juries. Variations include the kinds of cases tried before a jury, how many jurors hear a trial, and whether the lay person is involved in a single trial or holds a paid job similar to a judge, but with no legal training.

== Juror selection process ==
In the English model, potential jurors are generally summoned for duty, and then interviewed for their suitability to serve on the jury for a particular trial. The prosecutor and defense can dismiss potential jurors for various reasons, which can vary from one state to another, and they can have a specific number of arbitrary dismissals, or unconditional peremptory challenge, which does not require specific reasons. The judge can also dismiss potential jurors.

Some courts had been sympathetic to jurors' privacy concerns and refer to jurors by number, and conduct voir dire in camera (i.e., in private). In the United States, there have also been objections to requiring jurors to publicly give private information about themselves, such as medical conditions or whether they have used illegal drugs, even though this personal information might be relevant, for example, in a case about medical malpractice or drug trafficking.

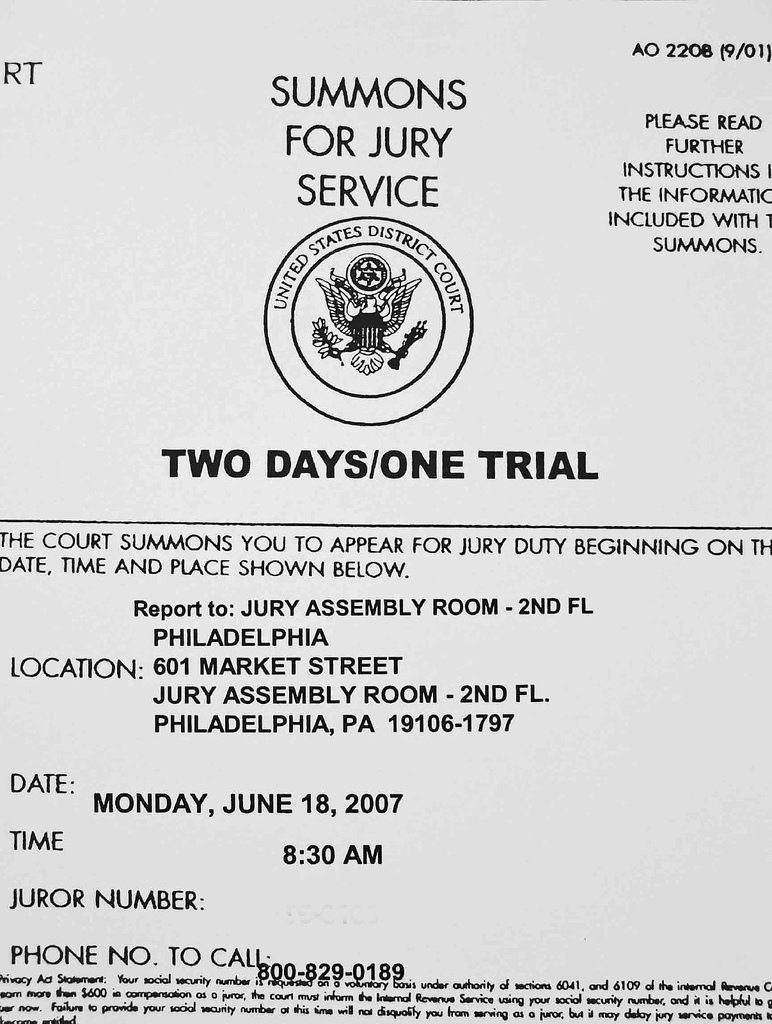
A jury duty summons

== Juries based on English model ==
The English model of a jury draws jurors from among the citizens. This approach is based on the traditions of English common law. This approach uses an adversarial system, and the jury is separate from the court. Generally the point of the jury is to determine whether the prosecution has proven the defendant to be guilty. The jury generally does not choose the penalty. This model is used in Australia, Canada, New Zealand, Ireland, the United Kingdom, the United States, and many former British colonies, as well as Austria and Spain.

=== Australia ===
Potential jurors in Australia are randomly selected from an electoral roll.

Jurors receive a small payment for each day of attendance. Employers are also required to pay their employees "make-up pay", that is, the usual pay the employee would have earned from working, less the jury duty payment received from the state. Under the National Employment Standards, make-up pay is required only for the first ten days of jury service; however, the laws of Victoria, Queensland and Western Australia extend the make-up pay requirement for the entire duration of the jury service.

==== New South Wales ====
The jury system in New South Wales is administered by the Jury Services Branch of the Office of the Sheriff of New South Wales, an office in the New South Wales Department of Attorney General and Justice, and operates in accordance with the Jury Act 1977 and Jury Amendment Act 2010. These laws detail persons who are disqualified, ineligible, or may be excused from jury service. In addition, the Jury Exemption Act 1965 and section 7, "Excuse for cause", of LRC Report 117 (2007) details other persons who can or may not serve as jurors or otherwise claim exemption.

Individuals who are blind and/or deaf may be excluded from jury service.

During the juror selection process, both parties can object to up to three potential jurors without providing reasons.

The Office of the Sheriff of NSW disseminates resources for jurors. Jurors may be compensated for their service.

=== United Kingdom ===
According to 2016 figures from the Ministry of Justice, there is about a 35% chance of people in England and Wales being summoned for jury service over the course of their lifetime. In Scotland, the percentage is much higher due to having a lower population as well having juries made up of 15 people (as opposed to 12 people in England and Wales).

=== United States ===
When a person is called for jury duty in the United States, that service is mandatory, and the person summoned for jury duty must attend. Failing to report for jury duty can result in a wide range of penalties, from simply being placed back into the selection pool to immediate criminal prosecution and having a bench warrant issued for contempt of court. Employers are not allowed to fire an employee for being called to jury duty, but they are typically not required to pay salaries during this time. Jury duty reimbursement is as little as $5 per day, although a juror can plead to be excused for financial hardship. An individual who reports to jury duty may be asked to serve as a juror in a trial or as an alternate juror, or they may be dismissed.

In the United States, government employees are in a paid status of leave (in accordance with 5 U.S.C. § 6322) for the duration of time spent serving as a juror (also known as court duty or court leave by some organizations). Many quasi-governmental organizations have adopted this provision into their contract manuals. Accordingly, government employees are in a paid status as long as they have received a summons in connection with a judicial proceeding, by a court or authority responsible for the conduct of that proceeding to serve as a juror (or witness) in the District of Columbia or a state, territory, or possession of the United States, Puerto Rico, or the Trust Territory of the Pacific Islands.

The US Supreme Court has held, in Butler v. Perry, 240 U.S. 328 (1916), that the Thirteenth Amendment, which prohibits "slavery [and] involuntary servitude, except as a punishment for crime," does not prohibit "enforcement of those duties which individuals owe to the state, such as services in the army, militia, on the jury, etc."

In both the United States and Canada, jurors having conscientious objections to service are generally excused from service. This chiefly includes religious groups such as the Amish, Conservative Mennonites, and Old Order Mennonites.

== Mixed tribunal ==
A mixed tribunal is one in which the case is tried collaboratively by a combination of trained judges and lay jurors. The judges and the jurors are officially considered equal but have distinct roles. The judges and jurors tend, in most cases, to agree with each other, though in a few cases, they take different perspectives. Compared to the English model, mixed tribunals are more likely to result in agreement between the judge and the jury.

In the German Schöffen model, a trained judge and two lay judges collaborate to determine whether a defendant is guilty. The jurors are considered part of the court, and work with the judge throughout a trial. The jurors are allowed to ask questions of the prosecution and defense during the trial.

In France, judges and lay jurors similarly work together, but the number of lay people involved is much larger, ranging from 9 to 12 jurors plus a panel of three professional judges. French jurors are selected at random and work with the judges only during the final deliberations.

In a third model of collaborative juries, the court includes jurors with relevant expertise in certain trials. For example, in Croatia, juvenile court cases are required to have jurors with experience in juvenile education, such as teachers.

Russia used a mixed tribunal system until 1993, and then converted to an adversarial model that requires juries to answer specific questions about facts, rather than producing a verdict of guilty or not guilty.

In the state of Vermont in the United States in certain lower courts the verdict is decided by two elected lay people known as side judges along with the professional judge.

== Lay judges ==
In some systems, minor cases are decided by an individual who does not have legal training. This can be considered a form of jury service in the sense that the verdict is decided by a citizen with no legal training.
