= Geoffrey Giudice =

Australian judge (1947–2021)

Geoffrey Michael Giudice AO (16 December 1947 – 18 November 2021) was a Judge of the Federal Court of Australia from 1997 to 2012 and the president of Fair Work Australia from 2009 to 2012.

Giudice studied at Xavier College, Melbourne before taking up Law at the University of Melbourne, graduating in 1970. He spent nine years working in industry before beginning to practise as a solicitor in 1979. He was admitted to the Bar in Victoria in 1984. As a barrister, he specialised in industrial relations and employment law. He was appointed a judge of the Federal Court of Australia on 17 September 1997. At the same time, he became the president of the Australian Industrial Relations Commission.

In 2009, when the Commission was replaced by the newly established Fair Work Australia, Giudice was appointed its first president. He retired from this position in February 2012, and was succeeded by former Victorian Supreme Court judge, now Federal Court judge Iain Ross.

== Death ==
In 2020, he was diagnosed with an inoperable brain tumour. He died on 18 November 2021, aged 73.
