= Long service leave =

Type of paid leave in Australia

In Australia, long service leave (LSL) is a period of additional paid leave granted to employees who have completed an extended period of service with an employer. Under Australian law, most employees are entitled to long service leave if they work for the same employer for a prolonged length of time, the threshold usually being between seven and ten years. Long service leave is separate from annual leave; employees receiving long service leave continue to accrue annual leave as normal and, at a minimum, as prescribed by the National Employment Standards.

Currently there is no uniform national long service leave standard in Australia; the rules governing long service leave entitlements vary depending on the relevant jurisdiction or industrial instrument (e.g., award or enterprise agreement). The qualifying period of service ranges from seven to fifteen years, although, as noted, in most instances it is no higher than ten years. The initial period of leave granted to eligible employees varies between around six and thirteen weeks. Long service leave legislation in many of the states and territories goes on to provide further long service leave entitlements should the employee continue to work with the employer.

Long service leave taken or cashed out is generally paid at the employee's ordinary pay rate, being the base hourly rate or salary stripped of any allowances, penalties, shift loading or overtime that they may otherwise be entitled to. Unused long service leave is paid out to employees when employment is terminated. Normally employees who terminate before reaching the length of service required to access long service leave do not receive any payment related to long service leave notionally accrued during their employment. However, some state legislation contains limited exceptions to this rule.

The Institute of Actuaries of Australia estimated that the total value of long service leave benefits in Australia was around $16.5 billion in 2001.

There has been a debate in Australia about the protection of employee entitlements (including long service leave) in the event of employer insolvency, with some high-profile cases involving employees losing benefits that had been accrued.

== Long service leave entitlements ==
Australian long service legislation is currently in a transitional state, pending development of a uniform national standard.

Most employee's entitlements arise from state or territory legislation.

For employees in industries or occupations covered by industrial awards, long service leave entitlements are determined by the award if the award includes long service leave terms. If the award does not consider long service leave entitlements, employees under this award should instead refer to state or territory legislation. Note that only pre-modern awards (industrial awards which existed prior to 1 January 2010) contain terms regarding entitlements. Modern awards do not include long service leave content. As such, these are being slowly phased out to allow for a new, centralised system.

For all other employees, minimum entitlements are derived from the relevant state or territory long service leave laws.

See below for a high level summary of long service leave legislation in each state or territory:

- Commonwealth (applies to federal public servants): 3 months on full pay after 10 years' continuous service. Long service leave is a reward for every year of service, however due to the misinterpretation of the Long Service Leave (Commonwealth Employees) Act 1976 and the failure to comply with the rules of statutory interpretation and the total disregard for section 15AA of the Acts Interpretation Act 1901 (Cth), the Commonwealth unlawfully withholding accrued LSL entitlements, thus denying the employee the reward for every year of service. In effect, a person can work for the Commonwealth for 10 years and accrue 90 days of LSL but the Commonwealth will withhold some or all of the entitlements despite there being no legislation that allows for this to occur.
- Australian Capital Territory: 6.066 weeks after seven years' continuous service. For each year thereafter, employees are entitled to a further LSL accrual, at a rate of one-fifth of a month LSL per year.
- New South Wales: two months' leave after 10 years' continuous service. One month's leave for each subsequent five years of continuous service. Pro-rata payment on termination if they have completed at least five years of service with their employer, and were dismissed for a reason other than misconduct, or resigned due to illness, injury, other pressing necessity, or the death of a coworker.
- Northern Territory: 13 weeks after 10 years' continuous service.
- Queensland: 8.6667 weeks after 10 years' continuous service. Five years after that, a further 4.3333 weeks. Employees who complete at least seven years of continuous service may receive a pro-rata payment on termination if they were dismissed for a reason other than their conduct, capacity or performance; they resigned due to illness, injury, other pressing necessity, or they were terminated by their death.
- South Australia: 13 weeks after 10 years' continuous service. 1.3 weeks for each subsequent year of service. A pro-rata payment is available for employees who terminate after seven years continuous service.
- Tasmania: 8 2/3 weeks in respect of the first 10 years of continuous service and 4 1/3 weeks in respect of every subsequent five years of continuous service. (For mining workers, the entitlement is 13 weeks in respect of every 10 years of continuous service.)
- Victoria: Accrues at a rate of one week for each 60 weeks of continuous employment (approximately 0.866 weeks per year), and can be taken any time after seven years' continuous service.
- Western Australia: 8.6667 weeks after each period of 10 years' continuous service.

== Portable LSL ==
Within a limited number of industries, such as construction, coal mining, contract cleaning industries and the public sector, it is possible to transfer long-service leave entitlements from one employer to another, as long as the employee remains in the same state. Known as portable long service leave this is done mostly through specific legislated schemes which employers in those industries pay into, and which administer the funds for employees.

The Australian Senate in November 2015 requested a committee to inquire into portable long service leave schemes, to consider how portable schemes might be structured, what role the Australian Federal Government might play in helping to establish a scheme, and to evaluate the effect that the differing State long service entitlements will have on a national scheme (given the state-based long service leave provisions were all practically different). Three recommendations were made: that the states and territories consider developing a nationally consistent scheme, the Australian Bureau of Statistics examine the development of an insecure work indicator, and detailed modelling be undertaken about the potential cost to employees for extending portable LSL to all workers.

By January 2023, there was no national scheme.

== History ==
Long service leave is a benefit peculiar to Australia (and possibly some civil servants in India), and arises from the colonial heritage of each country. There is also a similar system of sabbatical leave in Finland. Long service leave developed from the concept of furlough, which stems from the Dutch word verlof (meaning leave), where in the colonies was leave granted from military service.

In Australia, the benefit was first granted to Victorian and South Australian public servants in the 1860s. The nature of the leave allowed public servants, after 10 years' service, to sail "home" to England or elsewhere, safe in the knowledge that they would be able to resume their positions upon their return to Australia.

Section 37 of the Victorian Civil Service Act 1862 (25 Vict. No. 160) read:

"Where any officer desires to visit Europe or some other distant country if he have continued in the civil service of the colony at least ten years and have not been reduced for misconduct or deprived of leave of absence under this Act the Governor in council may grant to him leave of absence upon half-salary for a period not exceeding twelve months but for such period of absence such officer shall not be entitled to receive any annual increment."

Over the period from 1950 to 1975, the benefit spread beyond the public service, mainly as a result of pressure from non-government employees seeking comparability with public servants.

In the 19th century, furlough as a benefit as it is now known, was a privilege granted by legislation to the Colonial and Indian services.

== See also ==
- Employee benefits
- Labour law
- Parental leave
- Sick leave
