= AFPC =

AFPC may refer to:

- American Foreign Policy Council, a non-profit organization based in the US
- Australian Fair Pay Commission, an Australian legislative body created in 2006
- Air Force Personnel Center, a field operating agency of the US Air Force
- Alliance de la Fonction publique du Canada, or Public Service Alliance of Canada, a Canadian labour union
