= Portable long service leave =

Long service leave is type of leave unique to Australia and New Zealand, typically awarded to a staff member after completing a considerable tenure with a single company. However, within a limited number of industries, or within the public sector it is possible to transfer long service leave entitlements from one employer to another.

== Industry-specific portable long-service leave ==
Industry-specific portable long-service leave allows workers to transfer their accrued long service leave entitlements from employer to employer within an industry. Portable Long Service Leave is legislated and available for workers in certain industries including:

- The Australian Building and Construction Industry
- The Australian Coal Mining Industry
- The Australian Stevedoring Industry
- The Australian Contract Cleaning Industry

The leave is typically funded by a central scheme that accepts payment from current employers, and pays the leave once enough service is accrued. Interest in maintaining and promoting the schemes is largely driven by Unions.
