= List of Queensland courts and tribunals =

The following is a list of courts and tribunals in Queensland as of July 2022:

- Supreme Court of Queensland
  - Queensland Court of Appeal
  - Supreme Court (Trial Division)
  - Court of Disputed Returns
- District Court of Queensland
- Magistrates' Court of Queensland
  - Children's Court of Queensland
- Coroners Court of Queensland
- Industrial Court of Queensland
  - Queensland Industrial Relations Commission
- Land Court
  - Land Appeal Court
- Queensland Civil and Administrative Tribunal
- Planning and Environment Court
- Specialist courts:
  - Drug and Alcohol Court
  - Mental Health Court
  - Murri Court (in both Magistrates and Children's Courts)
  - Specialist Domestic Violence Court at Southport
