= Ian Harper =

Australian economist

Professor Ian Harper AO FASSA FAICD

Personal details
- Born: Ian Ross Harper
- Occupation: Economist

Ian Ross Harper is an Australian economist, economics professor and former dean of the Melbourne Business School.

Harper has a Bachelor of Economics with honours from the University of Queensland and a Master of Economics and Doctor of Philosophy from the Australian National University. Before becoming the dean, he was Professor emeritus at the Melbourne Business School, a graduate school of the University of Melbourne.

== Career ==
Harper began his career working at the Reserve bank, after completion of his PhD. He was the inaugural chairman of the Australian Fair Pay Commission before that body was abolished in 2009. He then joined Deloitte's Melbourne office as a partner, and then senior adviser. He headed the Federal Government's Competition Review, releasing the final report ("the Competition Policy Review" or "Harper Review") of 56 recommendations on 31 March 2015. He was appointed to the board of the Reserve Bank in 2016 before returning to academia as the Dean of the Melbourne Business School, in 2018. He retired from the Melbourne Business School in December 2023.

== Published works ==
Harper has published numerous articles, and wrote Economics for life (ISBN 0908284950) which won the 2011 SPCK Australian Christian Book of the Year Award.

== Honours ==
Harper was elected to the Australian Fellowship of the Academy of Social Sciences in 2000 and later elected to the Fellowship of the Australian Institute of Company Directors.

Harper was made an Officer of the Order of Australia in the 2020 Queen's Birthday Honours, "for distinguished service to education in the field of economics, and to public and monetary policy development and reform."

== Personal life ==
Harper is a professing Christian and often speaks publicly about his Christian faith.
