= Workplace Relations Act 1996 =

Act of the Parliament of Australia, no longer in force

Parliament of Australia
- Long title: An Act relating to workplace relations, and for other purposes
- Commenced: 1 January 1997
- Repealed: 1 July 2009
- Introduced by: Howard government

Repeals
- Industrial Relations Act 1988

Amended by
- 2005

Repealed by
- Fair Work Act 2009
- Status: Repealed

The Workplace Relations Act 1996 was an Australian law regarding workplace conditions and rights passed by the Howard government after it came into power in 1996. It replaced the previous Labor Government's Industrial Relations Act 1988 and Industrial Relations Reform Act 1993, and commenced operation on 1 January 1997. In 2005, the Howard government passed the Workplace Relations Amendment Act 2005 which came into effect on 27 March 2006 and substantially amended the original Act, bringing in the WorkChoices changes to Australian labour law. The Act was repealed on 1 July 2009 by the Fair Work Act 2009 passed by the Rudd Labor Government, and superseded by the Fair Work (Registered Organisations) Act 2009.

== Provisions ==
The Act provided for the continuation of the existing federal award system which provided a minimum set of terms and conditions for employment. It kept the previous Australian Industrial Relations Commission, which continued to determine federal awards but whose determinations were restricted to consideration of just 20 "allowable award matters", namely:

- classification of employees
- hours of work
- rates of pay
- piece rates, tallies and bonuses
- various forms of leave (e.g. annual and long service leave)
- public holidays
- allowances
- penalty rates
- redundancy pay
- notice of termination
- dispute settling procedures
- stand down provisions
- jury service
- pay and conditions

Some of its provisions upon first being enacted included:

- the introduction of Australian Workplace Agreements, a form of individual contract which can override collective agreements;
- expansion of the use of enterprise bargaining agreements;
- a reduction of the allowable matters in federal awards to 20;
- restrictions on union activity; and
- outlawing closed shops.

== Associated regulations ==
The original regulations associated with the Act, the Workplace Relations Regulations 1996, were repealed and replaced with the Workplace Relations Regulations 2006 in order to accommodate the WorkChoices amendments to the Workplace Relations Act 1996 introduced on 27 March 2006. Those regulations were themselves repealed when the Fair Work Act 2009 commenced on 1 July 2009.
