= Judith Sloan =

Australian economist, business journalist (born 1954)

Judith Sloan (born 22 November 1954) is an Australian economist.

Sloan was born in Melbourne. She has been teaching as a university professor at Flinders University and the Curtin Institute of Technology and is an honorary professorial fellow at the Melbourne Institute of Applied Economic and Social Research of the University of Melbourne. She served as a commissioner on the Australian government's Productivity Commission and the Australian Fair Pay Commission, and she was deputy chair of the Australian Broadcasting Corporation and is a former board director of the Lowy Institute.

Sloan sat on the boards of several companies, including Mayne Nickless, SGIO Insurance, Santos, Primelife (chair). The Australian federal government appointed her to the Australian Constitutional Convention 1998; she was a founding member of the group Conservatives for an Australian Head of State.

She writes for The Australian and is a frequent guest on the ABC talk show Q&A. An email leak in November 2018 revealed that Sloan earns A$357,000 for her work as contributing economics editor at The Australian.
