= National Employment Standards =

Minimum entitlements for employees in Australia

The National Employment Standards (NES) is a set of eleven minimum entitlements for employees in Australia who are covered by the Fair Work Act 2009. An award, enterprise agreement, other registered agreement or employment contract cannot provide for conditions that are less than the national minimum wage or the National Employment Standards and they can not be excluded. The NES have applied to employees since 1 January 2010, having replaced the previous five entitlement standard (called the Australian Fair Pay and Conditions Standard) under the WorkChoices legislation.

As most Australian employees are covered by the Fair Work Act, the National Employment Standards are considered a cornerstone of the Australian industrial relations system. Breaching the National Employment Standards can bring about serious legal consequences, and the Federal Circuit Court of Australia has sanctioned employers with significant penalties for non-compliance.

== Origins ==
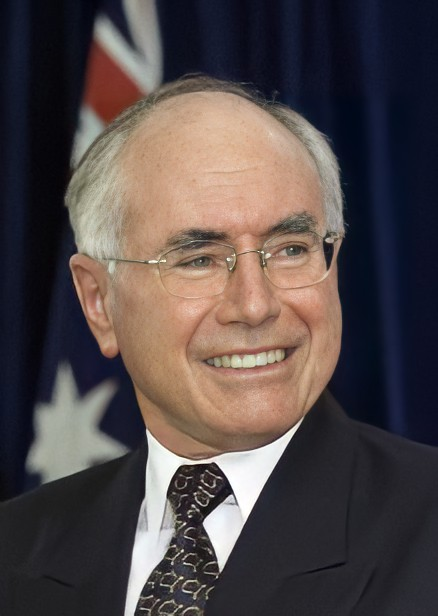
John Howard, Prime Minister of the Howard Government responsible for WorkChoices

Minimum standards feature prominently across the industrial relation systems of most modern economies, establishing a floor of workplace rights and entitlements. Such standards promote fair treatment of workers by protecting job security and working conditions. Despite the significance of legislated minimum standards internationally, prior to the NES these were confined to basic entitlements at the state level and included public holidays and long service leave. General standards were developed through regulation and judicial bodies such Fair Work Australia.

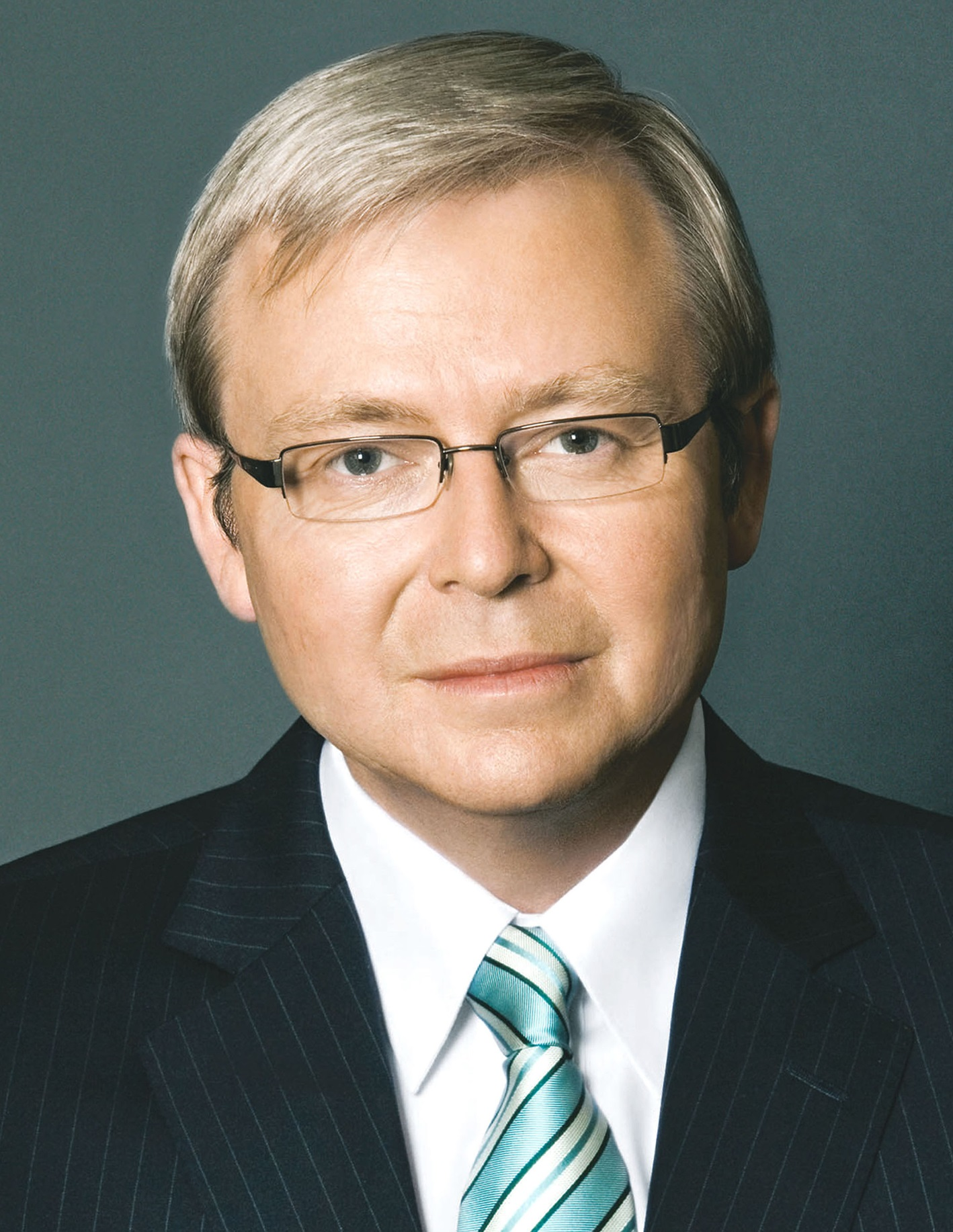
Kevin Rudd, Prime Minister of the Rudd Government responsible for introducing the NES

Early in the 1990s came an increase in statutory minimum standards through the enactment of the Industrial Relations Reform Act 1993 (Cth), which implemented minimum standards on matters such as unfair dismissal, notice requirements for termination, and other matters. Inspired by what is considered to be 'neoliberal philosophies', this reform was also intended to displace awards in favour of enterprise bargaining. The Howard Government introduced WorkChoices, considered to be the 'most radical neoliberal reform' at the federal level.

With WorkChoices came the AFPCS, a set of five statutory minimum standards, to much criticism. Bray and Stewart describe the Fair Work Act as a 'rebalancing' of WorkChoices, and the NES formed part of this reform.

== Safety net ==
There are eleven minimum conditions covered under the National Employment Standards:

Maximum weekly hours: This standard provides that employers must not request or require an employee to work more than 38 hours for full-time employees or the ordinary hours of work for a part-time employee.

Requests for flexible working arrangements: This standard allows for employees to request a change to their working arrangements where such change relates to any of the circumstances listed in the Act, which includes caring for children or family, disability, age, or family violence.

Unpaid parental leave: Parents who complete 12 months service with an employer become entitled to take a period of 12 months of unpaid parental leave without pay from their employer.

Annual leave: Australian employees receive 20 days of paid annual leave per year, which is said to be generous compared to many countries.

Personal leave: 10 days of personal leave per year is provided, with this for use when an employee is unfit for work due to illness or family emergency, and 20 days of paid leave for domestic violence purposes.

Community service leave: This entitlement allows employees to take unpaid community service leave for activities such as voluntary emergency management activities or jury duty.

Long service leave: An employee gets long service leave after a long period of working for the same employer, and this entitlement varies from state to state.

Public holidays: This entitles employees to be absent from work on a day that is a public holiday in their base state of work.

Notice of termination and redundancy pay: This provision ensures that employees are provided with a fair period of termination notice, and redundancy pay depending on years of service.

Fair work information statements: Standardised documents on the rights of employees which must be given to any new employee on commencement.

Casual conversion and casual employment information statement Casual employees must be provided with a statement similar to the fair work information statement, but for casuals on their entitlements including the right to convert to permanent employment.

== Casual employees ==
Casual employees are entitled to a limited number of NES entitlements relating to:

- unpaid carer's leave
- unpaid compassionate leave
- community service leave
- Fair Work Information Statement.

In some states and territories long serving casuals are eligible for long service leave. Where there is an expectation of ongoing work for a casual and the casual has been employed regularly and systematically for at least 12 months, they have extra entitlements from the NES. These are:

- the right to request for flexible working arrangements
- access to parental leave.

== Application ==
The National Employment Standards apply in relation to employees and employers that are deemed part of the "national system". This means they must fall under the jurisdiction of the Fair Work Act 2009. Employers are not permitted to contravene the National Employment Standards.

== Criticism ==
Not all commentators agreed that the Rudd government had struck the right balance between simplification and appropriate protection. Baird and Williamson, for example, argued that the new minimum standards were detrimental to certain groups, particularly women, because the new awards failed to adequately cover women working in social services, call centres and the health sector.

Pittard observed the NES are not perceptively wider than the Australian Fair Pay and Conditions Standard and other minimum entitlements provided for under the WorkChoices legislation the Fair Work Act was designed to replace. It has also been argued the NES may also be seen as an 'expansion of direct statutory regulation, because even if they simply recognise standards that already existed, their embodiment in legislation represented a different form of regulation, which made these standards available to a wider range of employees'.
