= Enterprise bargaining agreement =

Enterprise bargaining is an Australian term for a form of collective bargaining, in which wages and working conditions are negotiated at the level of the individual organisations, as distinct from sectoral collective bargaining across whole industries. Once established, they are legally binding on employers and employees that are covered by the Enterprise bargaining agreement. An Enterprise Agreement (EA) consists of a collective industrial agreement between either an employer and a trade union acting on behalf of employees or an employer and employees acting for themselves.

By definition, an agreement, is the outcome of a negotiation, and a decision, involving multiple parties. (See Fair trade)

On the one hand, collective agreements, at least in principle, benefit employers, as they allow for improved "flexibility" in such areas as ordinary hours, flat rates of hourly pay, and performance-related conditions. Whilst collective agreements may, on the other hand, benefit some workers by providing higher pay, bonuses, additional leave and enhanced entitlements (such as redundancy pay) than an award does, they also may reduce employees' bargaining power against their employers, impacting their ability to successfully obtain such benefits. In other words, whilst those employees who are successful in negotiating an Enterprise Agreement may receive greater benefits than those who are not, the overall number of employees earning comparatively high benefits may be reduced because few employees obtain an Enterprise Agreement.

== Industrial Awards and the Fair Work Act ==
Unlike awards, which provide similar standards for all workers in the entire industry covered by a specific award, collective agreements usually apply only to workers for one employer. However, a short-term collaborative agreement (for example, on a building-site) occasionally yields a multi-employer/employee agreement.

Parties endorse proposed enterprise agreements between themselves (in the case of employees the matter goes to a vote). The Fair Work Commission then assess them for approval. (Under the Fair Work Act 2009, agreements now renamed "enterprise agreements" and are lodged with the Fair Work Commission to assess entitlements against the modern award and be checked for breaches of the Act.)

=== History ===
Enterprise Bargaining Agreements were first introduced in Australia under the Prices and Incomes Accord in 1991 (Mark VII). They later became the centrepiece of the Australian industrial relations system when the Accord was next revised in 1993 (Mark VIII). This ended nearly a century of centralised wage-fixing based industrial relations.

=== How an enterprise agreement is made ===
The Fair Work Act 2009 provides a simple, flexible and fair framework that assists employers and employees to bargain in good faith to make an enterprise agreement.

Employers, employees and their bargaining representatives are involved in the process of bargaining for a proposed enterprise agreement. An employer must notify their employees of the right to be represented by a bargaining representative during the bargaining of an enterprise agreement (other than a greenfields agreement) as soon as possible, and not later than 14 days after the notification time for the agreement (usually the start of bargaining). The notification should be given to each current employee who will be covered by the enterprise agreement.

=== Use of enterprise agreements ===
A standard enterprise agreement would last for three years.

EAs had one unique feature in Australia: whilst negotiating a federal enterprise bargaining agreement, a group of employees or a trade union could, without legal penalties, undertake industrial action (including strikes) in pursuit of their claims .

=== Issues regarding enterprise agreements ===
A major legal question associated with enterprise agreements stemmed from the High Court of Australia's decision in the case of Electrolux v The Australian Workers' Union. The question revolved around what these industrial instruments could cover. The Australian Industrial Relations Commission determined the matter in 2005 in the three certified agreements case.

=== The future of EAs in Australian industrial law ===
In the context of Australian labour law, the industrial reform of 2005–2006, known as "WorkChoices" (with its corresponding amendments to the Workplace Relations Act (1996)) changed the name of such agreement documents to "Collective Agreement". State industrial legislation can also prescribe collective agreements, but the enactment of the WorkChoices reform will make such agreements less likely to occur.

Since the Fair Work Act was enacted, parties to Australian federal collective agreements now lodge their agreements with Fair Work Australia for approval. Before an enterprise agreement will be approved a member of the tribunal must be satisfied that employees employed under the agreement will be 'Better Off Overall' than if they were employed under the relevant modern award.

== See also ==
- Collective bargaining
- Sectoral collective bargaining
- UK labour law
- US labor law
