= Australian Fair Pay Commission =

The Australian Fair Pay Commission was an Australian statutory body that existed from 2006 to 2009. It was created under the Howard government's "WorkChoices" industrial relations laws in 2006 to set the minimum pay for workers. Established to replace the wage-setting functions of the Australian Industrial Relations Commission, the Commission set and adjusted a single adult minimum wage, non-adult minimum wages (such as training wage), minimum wages for award classification levels, and casual loadings. The Commission was abolished in December 2009 with the wage-setting function passing to the minimum wage panel of the Fair Work Commission.

The inaugural chairman of the Commission was Ian Harper and there were four commissioners: Hugh Armstrong, Patrick McClure, Mike O’Hagan, and Judith Sloan.

The profile of the members of the Commission was different from that of the Australian Industrial Relations Commission which previously had responsibility for determining the above matters. There was less representation of trade unions, and less transparency in decision-making, making it possible for the Commission to make judgements with no community oversight or consultation. Unlike the Australian Industrial Relations Commission, the Commission funded substantial research on the economic effects of raising the minimum wage, and proponents claimed that this placed more of an emphasis on determining whether the economic evidence suggested that raising the minimum wage made the poor better off.

Critics argued that the board lacked independence and scope and that it reduced the benefits of workers, while supporters believed it helped to stimulate the economy and improve working conditions.

== 2006 decision ==
On 26 October 2006, the Commission handed down its first decision. The Commission's media release stated:

The Australian Fair Pay Commission today announced an increase of $27.36 per week in the standard Federal Minimum Wage and in all Pay Scales up to $700 per week. This covers just over one million Australian workers who rely on the Commission’s decisions for adjustments in their wages.

The Commission also awarded an increase of $22.04 per week to all Pay Scales paying $700 per week and above, or more than $36,000 per year, representing another 220,000 workers, about 2% of the workforce.

In hourly terms, the Australian federal minimum wage increased to $13.47 per hour (for workers on pay scales of less than $700 per week), with effect from 1 December 2006.

Many commentators were surprised the Commission's first decision was so generous. For example, the Australian Council of Trade Unions had asked for a minimum wage increase of $30 per week. Despite this, the rise barely kept up with inflation since the previous pay rise handed down by the Australian Industrial Relations Commission in June 2005.

== 2007 decision ==
On 5 July 2007, the Commission handed down its second wage decision. The decision increased minimum wages from $13.47 to $13.74 per hour, or $10.26 a week for wages below $700, and by $5.30 for wages above $700. The rise took effect from the first pay period commencing on or after 1 October 2007. This was a change of policy from the Commission's first decision, which took effect on the 1 December 2007 and was criticised by employer groups for causing difficulties for businesses, which had to implement a pay rise within a pay period. Traditionally, the Australian Industrial Relations Commission implemented wage and allowance rises from the first 'pay period commencing' from a set date.

The Commission took into account the time period between the inaugural and second wage decisions, and other factors including tax cuts announced in the budget that took effect from 1 July 2007. The Commission, whilst considering these matters, did not discount the wage increase on account of tax cuts.

Another historic feature of the decision was that for the first time, farmers were granted a deferral from the wage increase on account of severe drought. Incapacity to pay had been argued numerous times over the last twenty five years, but mostly unsuccessfully, before the Australian Industrial Relations Commission. The Commission's decision granting the deferral was therefore a landmark in the history of industrial relations for the National Farmers' Federation.

== Trade union reaction ==
Trade unions viewed the Commission as a conservative business-friendly organisation that threatened the basic rights, pay and entitlements of workers. Further, they argued that the Commission benefited business at the expense of workers. Unions viewed the Australian Industrial Relations Commission as independent and wished to retain it as the minimum wage setting body. The ACTU's Greg Combet expressed his concern about Harper's ability in an interview with Radio National's Mark Colvin.

== See also ==
- Australian Government
- Australian Labor Party
- Liberal Party of Australia
