= Fair Work Ombudsman =

Independent agency of the government of Australia

Office of the Fair Work Ombudsman

Agency overview
- Formed: 1 July 2009; 17 years ago
- Employees: 1000+
- Minister responsible: Amanda Rishworth, Minister for Employment and Workplace Relations
- Agency executive: Anna Booth, Fair Work Ombudsman
- Website: www.fairwork.gov.au

The Fair Work Ombudsman (FWO) (or formally, the Office of the Fair Work Ombudsman), is an independent statutory agency of the Government of Australia that serves as the central point of contact for free advice and information on the Australian national workplace relations system. The Office of the Fair Work Ombudsman also investigates workplace complaints and enforces compliance with national workplace laws.

The FWO, along with the Fair Work Commission (former Fair Work Australia), the national workplace relations tribunal, began operation on 1 July 2009 under the Fair Work Act 2009.

The agency head is the Fair Work Ombudsman, Anna Booth, who reports to the Hon. Amanda Rishworth MP, Minister for Employment and Workplace Relations.

== Office holders ==
The agency is headed by the Fair Work Ombudsman who is appointed by the relevant Minister under the Fair Work Act 2009 for a term up to 5 years. There have been four statutory appointments to that office since the FWO's inception:

Name	Years in office	Prior & subsequent roles
Nicholas Wilson	2009–2013	Workplace Ombudsman (2007–2009); Commissioner of the Fair Work Commission (2013–present)
Natalie James	2013–2018	Senior manager at the Department of Education, Employment and Workplace Relations (to 2013); Partner, Deloitte (2018–22); Chair of the Victorian Government Inquiry into the Victorian On-Demand Workforce (2018–20); Secretary of the Department of Employment and Workplace Relations (2022–2026)
Sandra Parker PSM	2018–2023	Deputy Secretary at the Department of Jobs and Small Business (2011–2018)
Anna Booth	2023–present	Deputy President of the Fair Work Commission (2012–2020)

== Operational activities ==
The functions of the Fair Work Ombudsman are set out in section 682 of the Fair Work Act 2009. The Office of the Fair Work Ombudsman achieves its functions by:

- providing education, assistance, advice and guidance to employers, employees, outworkers, outworker entities and organisations
- promoting and monitoring compliance with workplace laws
- inquiring into and investigating breaches of the Fair Work Act
- taking appropriate enforcement action
- performing its statutory functions efficiently, effectively, economically and ethically.

== The Office of the Fair Work Ombudsman ==
The Office of the Fair Work Ombudsman consists of the Fair Work Ombudsman, supporting staff and Fair Work Inspectors who are all focused on serving the needs of everyone covered by the Australian workplace system. The Fair Work Ombudsman have offices in all capital cities and 14 regional locations across Australia.

== Functions ==
The functions of the Office of the Fair Work Ombudsman, as set out in the Fair Work Act 2009, include:

=== Education and advice ===
The Fair Work Ombudsman offers employers and employees free information and advice on pay, conditions, and workplace rights and obligations under the national workplace relations system.

The FWO’s website offers a variety of information for employees and employers on Australian workplace laws, including:

- Pay and wages
- Leave
- Starting and ending employment
- Employment conditions
- Workplace problems.

The FWO’s website also has tools and resources such as:

- Pay Calculators that help people to work out entitlements under Australian workplace laws
- resources specifically designed to help small business including a Small Business Showcase, and
- information and resources on specific industries and topics.

The FWO publishes regular content through its subscription services and across its communication channels including YouTube, Facebook, Instagram, LinkedIn and X to help inform the community about workplace rights and obligations. The FWO also publishes information on its compliance activities and enforcement outcomes through media releases.

=== Audits & Campaigns ===
The Fair Work Ombudsman conducts targeted campaigns and audits. Through targeted campaigns, the Ombudsman aims to inform employers in a specific industry of their obligations, and ensure that they understand and comply with Commonwealth workplace laws. Campaigns can be national, state-based or regional.

An audit is where Fair Work Inspectors check an employer's records to make sure they comply with Commonwealth workplace laws. Sometimes, FWO undertakes an audit or a series of audits in response to a complaint or information given by an industry association, a government minister, the media or another source.

=== Complaints ===
Those in the national workplace relations system can ask FWO for help with a workplace problem. This usually relates to pay and other conditions of employment such as leave, notice and hours of work. In accordance with its Compliance and Enforcement Policy, the FWO will make a decision about the best course of action to resolve the dispute. The FWO will consider the kinds of issues raised, its priority areas and its Compliance and Enforcement Policy.

==== Next steps ====
The Office of the Fair Work Ombudsman will make a decision about the best course of action to resolve the complaint. FWO might decide:

- that the matter is outside of their jurisdiction and refer you somewhere else
- that there has not been a breach of Commonwealth workplace laws
- that mediation is the best way to resolve the issues
- to conduct a formal investigation
- to conduct an audit.

If the FWO decides to commence an investigation, it will look at employment records and documents to find out the facts of a workplace complaint and to decide if relevant parties have complied with Commonwealth workplace laws.

===== Compliance and enforcement =====
The Fair Work Ombudsman can inquire into and investigate breaches of the Fair Work Act. The FWO has a range of processes and enforcement options for contraventions which include:

- Workplace investigations
- Compliance notices
- Infringement notices
- Compliance Partnerships
- Enforceable undertakings
- Litigation.

== See also ==
- Fair Work Commission
- Fair Work Act 2009
- Safe Work Australia
