= Modern award =

Ruling on minimum pay rates and other conditions of work in Australia

A modern award (or award previously known as an "industrial award") is a ruling in Australian labour law of the national Fair Work Commission (or its predecessor) or by a state industrial relations commission which grants all wage earners in one industry or occupation the same minimum pay rates and conditions of employment such as leave entitlements, overtime and shift work, as well as other workplace-related conditions. The national awards, with the National Employment Standards, provide a minimum safety net of terms and conditions of employment for all national system employees. The pay rates are often called award wages or award rates. Awards in Australia are part of the system of compulsory arbitration in industrial relations.

== History ==
Federal awards in Australia were stripped back to number 122 under the Abbott government, to promote the Enterprise Bargaining Agreement system.

A similar system was also used in New Zealand prior to the Labour Relations Act 1987. New Zealand no longer uses the award system, and the only form of collective bargaining is collective agreements, which apply only to the particular unions and employers that negotiate them.

== See also ==
- Australian labour law
- Common rule awards
