= Fair Work Commission =

Australian industrial relations tribunal

- Logo
- Established: 2009; 17 years ago
- Location: All capital cities in Australia.
- Motto: Australia's national workplace relations tribunal
- Composition method: Appointed by the Governor-General on the recommendation of the Australian Government
- Authorised by: Fair Work Act 2009
- Annual budget: A$126.89 million (2021–22)
- Website: www.fwc.gov.au

President
- Currently: Justice Adam Hatcher
- Jurist term ends: At the age of 65

Vice Presidents
- Currently: Joe Catanzariti; Ingrid Asbury

The Fair Work Commission (FWC), until 2013 known as Fair Work Australia (FWA), is the Australian industrial relations tribunal created by the Fair Work Act 2009 as part of the Rudd Government's reforms to industrial relations in Australia. Operations commenced on 1 July 2009. It is the successor of the Australian Industrial Relations Commission, and also performs functions previously performed by the Workplace Authority and the Australian Fair Pay Commission.

The office of President of the Fair Work Commission has been held by Justice Adam Hatcher since 19 February 2023.

It operates under the portfolio of the Minister for Employment and Workplace Relations. The general manager of the FWC is Murray Furlong, who was appointed in October of 2021.

The FWC's functions include the setting and varying of industrial awards, minimum wage fixation, dispute resolution, the approval of enterprise agreements, and handling claims for unfair dismissal.

== Role ==
The FWC is an independent workplace relations tribunal with the power and authority to regulate and enforce provisions relating to minimum wages and employment conditions, enterprise bargaining, industrial action, dispute resolution, and termination of employment.

The Fair Work Act is an attempt to create a more national system for regulating industrial relations in Australia. Each state has the discretion to hand over some or all of their industrial relations powers to the Commonwealth, and should a state decide to refer their powers to a centralized and national industrial relations system, all the employees of that state would effectively be covered by the national Fair Work Act. The FWC has taken over the roles of the Australian Industrial Relations Commission (AIRC) in matters of workplace disputes and industrial actions. It is also involved in the process of determining national industrial relations policies, including setting minimum wages and regulating the award system. Since the introduction of the Fair Work Act, all states except Western Australia have referred their powers to the Commonwealth.

== Structure ==
When originally founded, all FWC members were previously members of the Australian Industrial Relations Commission. The FWC has a President, two Vice Presidents, a number of Deputy Presidents and Commissioners. The General Manager reports to the President and is responsible for administration. This position replaced the Industrial Registrar. The inaugural President was Justice Giudice. He retired from this position in February 2012, and was succeeded by former Victorian Supreme Court judge Iain Ross who served from 2012 to 2022.

Members are based in Melbourne, Sydney, Brisbane, Newcastle, Perth, Adelaide, and Canberra. The members of the Fair Work Commission, as at June 2026, are:

=== President ===
- Justice Adam Hatcher (Sydney)

=== Vice presidents ===
- Vice President I Asbury (Brisbane)
- Vice President M Gibian (Sydney)

=== Deputy presidents ===
- Deputy President M Binet (Perth)
- Deputy President WR Clancy (Melbourne)
- Deputy President LE Dean (Canberra)
- Deputy President A Colman (Melbourne)
- Deputy President I Masson (Melbourne)
- Deputy President A Beaumont (Perth)
- Deputy President A Millhouse (Melbourne)
- Deputy President T Saunders (Sydney/Newcastle)
- Deputy President N Lake (Brisbane)
- Deputy President G Boyce (Sydney)
- Deputy President B Cross (Sydney)
- Deputy President MJ Easton (Sydney)
- Deputy President A Bell (Melbourne)
- Deputy President T Dobson OAM (Brisbane)
- Deputy President PJ Hampton (Adelaide)
- Deputy President BM O'Neill (Melbourne)
- Deputy President J Wright (Sydney)
- Deputy President P O'Keeffe (Perth)
- Deputy President A Slevin (Sydney)
- Deputy President A Grayson (Sydney)
- Deputy President T Butler (Brisbane)
- Deputy President K Farouque (Melbourne)

=== Commissioners ===
- Commissioner PJ Spencer (Brisbane)
- Commissioner CF Simpson (Brisbane)
- Commissioner T Lee (Melbourne)
- Commissioner B Riordan (Sydney)
- Commissioner T Cirkovic (Melbourne)
- Commissioner K Harper-Greenwell (Melbourne)
- Commissioner J Hunt (Brisbane)
- Commissioner S McKinnon (Sydney)
- Commissioner L Yilmaz (Melbourne)
- Commissioner S Panopoulos (Melbourne)
- Commissioner P Ryan (Sydney)
- Commissioner A Matheson (Sydney)
- Commissioner P Schneider (Perth)
- Commissioner S Durham (Brisbane)
- Commissioner S Connolly (Melbourne)
- Commissioner S Crawford (Sydney)
- Commissioner M Perica AM (Melbourne)
- Commissioner P Lim (Perth)
- Commissioner S Allison (Melbourne)
- Commissioner OT Tran (Melbourne)
- Commissioner E Thornton (Adelaide)
- Commissioner J Fox (Melbourne)
- Commissioner B Redford (Melbourne)
- Commissioner D Sloan (Sydney)
- Commissioner T Clarke (Melbourne)
- Commissioner A Walkaden (Sydney)
- Commissioner J Rogers (Adelaide)

=== Additional members ===
Additional members are dual appointees with other bodies, or sit part-time as expert panel members:

- Deputy President DJ Barclay (President, Tasmanian Industrial Commission)
- Ms Labine-Romain (Expert Panel member)
- Professor Marian Baird (Expert Panel member)
- Mr Mark Cully (Expert Panel member)
- Dr Leonora Risse (Expert Panel member)

== See also ==
- Australian labour law
- Fair Work Ombudsman
- Australian Building and Construction Commission
