= Australian Industrial Relations Commission =

Workplace relations tribunal in Australia

- Established: 1956
- Dissolved: 2010
- Jurisdiction: Australia
- Authorised by: Commonwealth of Australia Workplace Relations Act 1996

The Australian Industrial Relations Commission (AIRC), known from 1956 to 1973 as the Commonwealth Conciliation and Arbitration Commission and from 1973 to 1988 as the Australian Conciliation and Arbitration Commission, was a tribunal with powers under the Workplace Relations Act 1996 (and equivalent earlier legislation) that existed from 1956 until 2010. It was the central institution of Australian labour law. The AIRC replaced a previous system of industrial courts, which broadly speaking, was engaged in the same functions, but with superior independence and powers.

== History ==
=== Commonwealth Court of Conciliation and Arbitration and the Boilermakers' decision ===
The Commonwealth Court of Conciliation and Arbitration, a court created in 1904 to hear and arbitrate industrial disputes, and to make awards, was abolished in 1956 following the decision of the High Court in the Boilermakers' case. The High Court held that the Court of Conciliation and Arbitration, as a tribunal exercising the non-judicial power of arbitration, could not also exercise judicial power as a Chapter III Court. The decision became an important demonstration of the separation of powers in Australia.

=== Commonwealth Conciliation and Arbitration Commission ===
Following the decision, two new bodies were created to emulate the function of the defunct court; the Commonwealth Conciliation and Arbitration Commission was created to carry out the non-judicial functions, and the Commonwealth Industrial Court (which would later be subsumed into the Federal Court of Australia) was created to exercise judicial powers.

Throughout its time, the Commission created Awards which covered a whole raft of industries. These Awards with Awards made by Industrial Relations Commissions of the respective six states of Australia acted as the unique system of minimum wage setting in Australia. The Commission also registered a large number of trade unions to assist in the Award formation process.

The Commission is famous for its cases on equal work and equal pay, as well as decisions on unfair dismissal, and redundancy pay.

One issue which dogged the Commission was that of what "pertained to the relationship between employer and employee". This had been a question of importance, since the Constitution required the Commission settle industrial disputes. These disputes were later categorised as a "dispute about matters which pertained to the relationship between employer and employee." The question continued to surface and in 2004 the High Court of Australia in the case of Electrolux v AWU applied the question (which had historically been applied to Awards) to Enterprise Bargaining Agreements. This led to around 6 months of industrial confusion until the Australian Industrial Relations Commission handed down the landmark decision of the Schefenacker, the Murray Bridge and the La Trobe University certified agreements ('the three certified agreements case'). It was seen by some as fitting that the last significant decision made by the Australian Industrial Relations Commission was to conclusively determine which matter did or did not pertain.

== Role ==
From 1956 to 2006 the Australian Industrial Relations Commission (under its various names) made awards which set the minimum terms and conditions of employment for workers who worked for certain employers or within certain industries. A standard award would have approximately 20–30 conditions and would be around 40 pages in length. The Awards were reviewed periodically.

The AIRC would also certify enterprise bargaining agreements. These agreements were negotiated collective contracts commonly between a union (as representative of the employees on a site) and an employer of the site.

The AIRC also registered trade unions and dealt with demarcation disputes between unions.

Finally, the AIRC dealt with unfair dismissal applications.

== WorkChoices and abolition ==
In 2006, under the WorkChoices laws effected at the end of 2005, the role of the AIRC was redefined. Its wage-setting powers were largely transferred to the Australian Fair Pay Commission. The AIRC's primary role instead became that of award "modernisation", with limited dispute-settling powers, and hearing of unfair dismissal applications.

Under the Rudd Labor Government the AIRC was abolished. Its functions were transferred in January 2010 to a division within Fair Work Australia (now the Fair Work Commission).
