= Fair Work Act 2009 =

Australian industrial relations law

Parliament of Australia
- Long title: An Act relating to workplace relations, and for related purposes
- Citation: No. 28, 2009 or No. 28, 2009 as amended
- Considered by: Australian House of Representatives
- Considered by: Australian Senate
- Royal assent: 7 April 2009
- Commenced: 1 July 2009

Legislative history

Initiating chamber: Australian House of Representatives
- Introduced by: Julia Gillard MP, Acting Prime Minister
- First reading: 25 November 2008
- Second reading: 4 December 2008
- Third reading: 4 December 2008

Revising chamber: Australian Senate
- Member(s) in charge: Joe Ludwig, Minister for Human Services
- First reading: 5 December 2008
- Second reading: 11 March 2009
- Third reading: 20 March 2009

Related legislation
- Industrial Relations Act 1988; Workplace Relations Amendment Act 2005
- Status: In force

The Fair Work Act 2009 (Cth) is an act of the Parliament of Australia, passed by the Rudd government to reform the industrial relations system of Australia. Replacing the Howard government's WorkChoices legislation, the act established Fair Work Australia, later renamed the Fair Work Commission.

As the core piece of Australian labour law legislation, it provides for terms and conditions of employment, and also sets out the rights and responsibilities of parties to that employment.

The act established a safety net consisting of a national set of employment standards, national minimum wage orders, and a compliance and enforcement regime. It also establishes an institutional framework for the administration of the system comprising the Fair Work Commission and the Fair Work Ombudsman, The Fair Work Divisions of the Federal Court and Federal Magistrates Court and, in some cases, state and territory courts, perform the judicial functions under the Act.

The act is the foundation of Australia's industrial relations legal framework, thought to be one of the most complex in the world.

== Background ==
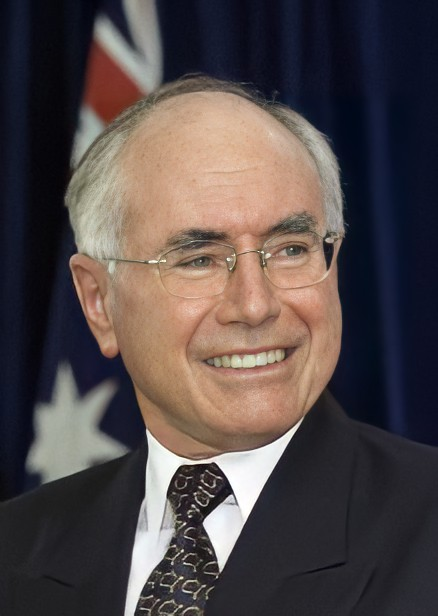
John Howard

The Howard government introduced WorkChoices in November 2005, these changes later credited a significant contributor to the defeat of the Coalition and installation of a Labor government committed to repealing the reforms. Joe Hockey, some days after his government lost power, described WorkChoices as "dead".

Introduced in 2008, the Act was explained as creating 'a national workplace relations system that is fair to working people, flexible for business and promotes productivity and economic growth'.

The then Minister for Employment and Workplace Relations, Julia Gillard was responsible for the Act's eventual implementation. Prior to taking office in 2007, Gillard had been responsible as party spokeswoman on industrial relations for negotiating with unions in drafting the Australian Labor Party's policy on industrial relations. This policy was formalised in April 2007 through Forward with Fairness, detailing 'Labor's plan for fairer and more productive Australian workplaces.

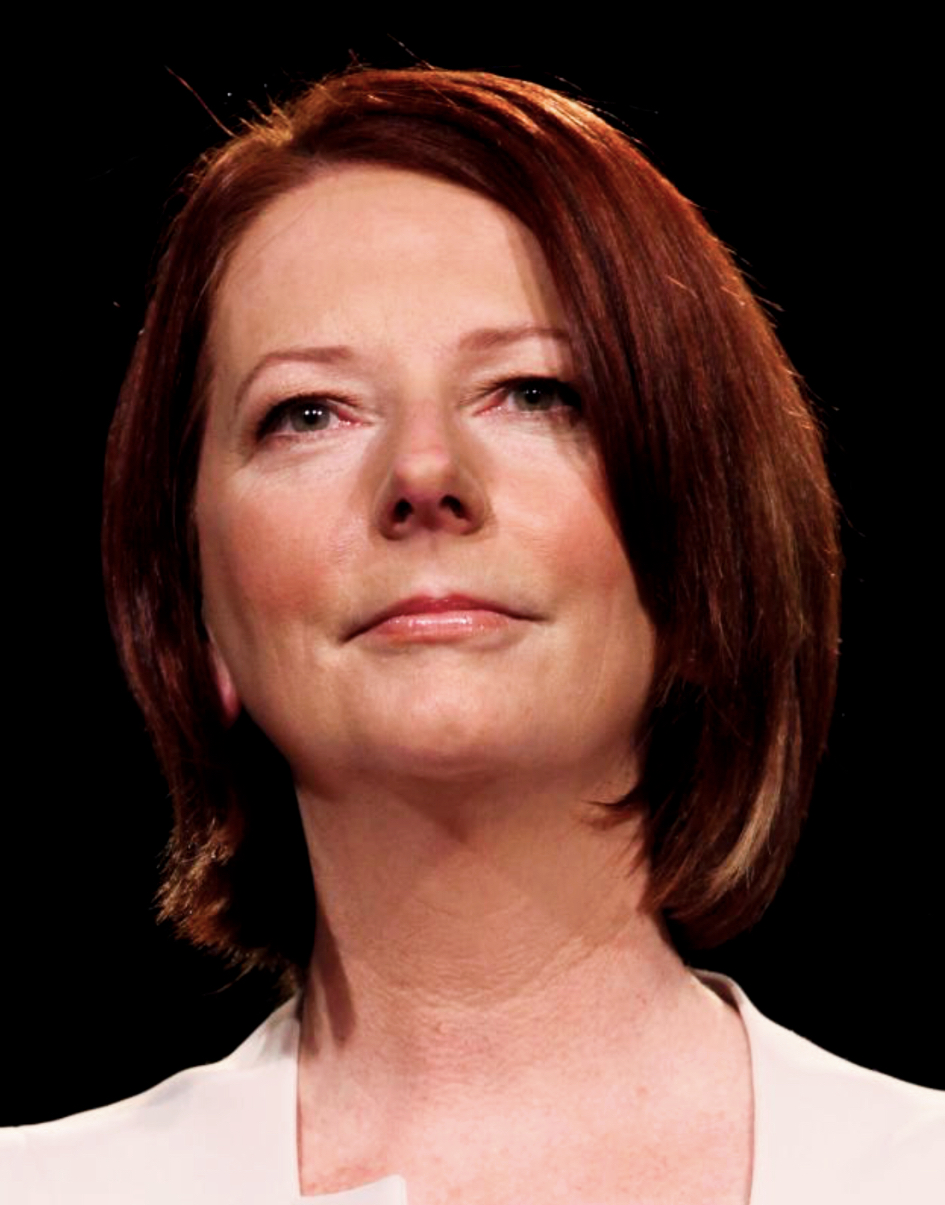
Julia Gillard

Gillard stated in a speech to the Australian Labor Law Association her ambition was to 'establish long-term stability in [the Australian industrial] relations system'. Beginning with the Industrial Relations Act 1988, the preceding two decades had been a prolonged period of repeated and substantial change to the Australian industrial landscape. The system following the passing of the Act was the first Australian labour law regime to last a full ten years in operation since the conciliation and arbitration model which characterised Australian industrial relations for much of the previous century.

A senior member of the Fair Work Commission acknowledged in 2014 that Australia's workplace laws are complex, often requiring specialist legal advice. Gillard has stated a fairer system meant 'in most cases lawyers [would not] be necessary', however under the reform, employers and employees are seeing an increasing risk of litigation and complexity, leading to increased involvement of lawyers.

== The Act ==
=== Collective bargaining ===
Collective bargaining is a mechanism which allows employees, employers and representational parties to express their objectives with respect to work. Such bargaining was at the centre of the Australian Labor Party's industrial relations policy. As noted by Woodward, modern awards would provide the 'floor' of entitlements, the base from which further conditions could be bargained. The Act enables bargains to be formalised into an enterprise agreement, which as noted by Naughton and Pittard, is the "principal focus" of the Act.

==== Part 2-4: Enterprise Agreements ====
On 1 July 2010, the new bargaining arrangements under the Act became operational. Contrary to the individual arrangements dominant under WorkChoices, the Act emphasises enterprise based bargaining, removing individual Australian Workplace Agreements. The Act continues to outlaw pattern bargaining and removed the distinction between union and non-union agreements.

Under the Act there are three types of enterprise agreement. First, a single-enterprise agreement made between an employer and the employees whom the agreement will cover. Second, a multi-enterprise agreement made between two or more employers, covering the employees of those employers. Third is a 'greenfields' agreement between an employer and trade union, made in relation to a new business which has not commenced operations.

===== Better Off Overall Test =====
The most common type of enterprise agreement is the single-enterprise, and the principal requirement for such an agreement to be approved by the Fair Work Commission is that it passes what is known as the "Better Off Overall Test" (BOOT). The BOOT involves the Fair Work Commission assessing a proposed agreement and ensuring it provides conditions more favourable than current legal minimum entitlements.

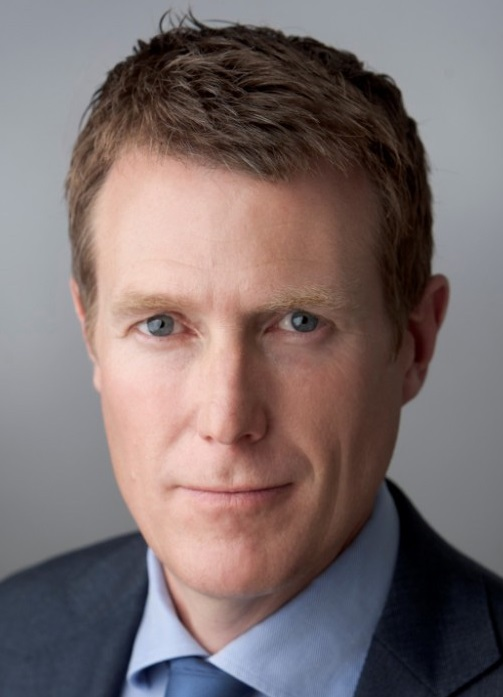
Christian Porter

The BOOT is different to its predecessor, the 'no disadvantage test' which allowed passing of a collective agreement provided it would not result in conditions less favourable to those otherwise applicable. Naughton and Pittard note the different language and requirements of the BOOT, suggesting it 'can be interpreted quite differently from the [no disadvantage test]' raising the bar higher to ensure workers are actually better off, rather than simply not disadvantaged.

There has been mostly partisan debate about aspects of the BOOT in its current form. The Industrial Relations Minister Christian Porter in 2020 introduced legislation designed to weaken the BOOT, but withdrew it in March 2021 in the face of opposition from independent crossbenchers. The legislation would have allowed the Fair Work Commission significant discretion to approve an agreement that places workers on conditions less favourable than they otherwise would be entitled. Trade unions and the Australian Labor Party argued such changes would result in cuts to workers pay and opposed the changes.

===== Good faith bargaining =====
A core objective of the Act is to enable the facilitation of good faith bargaining. This involves each party making a sincere effort in negotiations, including attending and participating in meetings at reasonable times, disclosing relevant information and considering proposals genuinely and in a timely manner. Capricious or unfair conduct undermining collective bargaining is prohibited. Parties may seek bargaining orders from the Fair Work Commission if they believe the other party has failed to comply with these good-faith bargaining obligations. Good-faith bargaining does not require a bargaining representative to make concessions during bargaining for the agreement, nor does it require a bargaining representative to reach agreement on the terms that are to be included in the agreement.

If one or more of the bargaining parties does not meet the good-faith requirements, the concerned party should first provide the party allegedly not bargaining in good faith with a written notice setting out those concerns to the relevant bargaining representatives, and a reasonable time within which to respond to those concerns. However, Section 229 of the Act states it may not be necessary to comply with the notice requirements should the Fair Work Commission be 'satisfied that it is appropriate in all the circumstances to do so'.

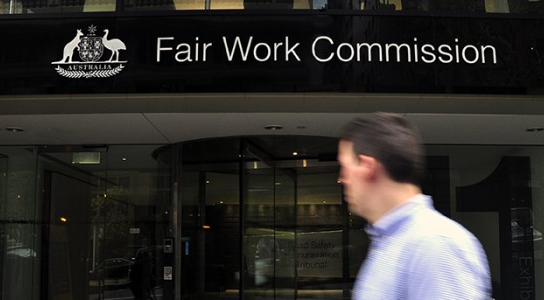
The Fair Work Commission at Melbourne

If the party does not respond appropriately to the written notice, the Fair Work Commission can make a bargaining order. Should the relevant party continue to ignore the good-faith requirements following this order, the Fair Work Commission can issue a serious breach declaration. If the bargaining representatives have not settled the issue of non-compliance by the end of the post-declaration negotiating period (generally 21 days), the Fair Work Commission can issue a bargaining related workplace determination.

===== Bargaining agents =====
The Act stipulates that employers must take all reasonable steps to notify employees of their right to a bargaining agent not later than 14 days after the notification time of the agreement. The notification time is the time when the employer agrees to bargain or initiates bargaining when the FWC determines that there is majority support among employees for collective bargaining, or when a scope order (an FWC-issued order to resolve questions about the employees covered by an agreement) comes into operation. The notice must specify that the employee may appoint a bargaining representative to represent the employee in bargaining for the agreement and a matter before FWC that relates to bargaining for the agreement. An employee organisation cannot be a bargaining representative of an employee unless the organisation is entitled to represent the industrial interests of the employee. A person may revoke their bargaining agent in writing. Bargaining agents are described in Division 3 of the Fair Work Act 2009, and can be the employer, a person the employer appoints in writing, the employee, or a person an employee appoints in writing.

If the employee is a member of an employee organisation that is entitled to represent the industrial interests of the employee and the employee does not appoint another person as their bargaining representative, the organisation will be the bargaining representative of the employee. Instruments for appointing a bargaining representative are also set out in Division 3. An appointment of a bargaining representative comes into force on the day specified in the instrument of appointment. The employer must be given the instrument of appointment of the bargaining agent. For an appointment made by an employer, a copy of the bargaining instrument must be given, on request, to a bargaining representative of an employee who will be covered by the agreement.

===== Mandatory terms =====
Mandatory terms in an enterprise agreement are set out in Division 5 of the Act. Agreements must include a flexibility term, that is, a mechanism for allowing variations in the agreement to meet needs of individual employees while still preserving basic entitlements and protections. They must include the obligation for the employer to consult with covered employees about major workplace changes that are likely to have a significant effect on the employees and allow for the representation of those employees for that consultation. The agreed-on base rate of pay cannot be below that set by the relevant modern award.

=== Key provisions ===
==== Part 2-2: National Employment Standards ====
There are eleven minimum conditions covered under the National Employment Standards:

- A limit on maximum weekly hours, ensuring employers can not request or require an employee to work more than 38 hours for full-time employees or the ordinary hours of work for a part-time employee.
- The ability to request flexible working arrangements, allowing for employees to request a change to their working arrangements where such change relates to any of the circumstances listed in the Act, which includes caring for children or family, disability, age, or family violence. Such a request may only be refused on 'reasonable business grounds'.
- Unpaid parental leave, so parents who complete 12 months service with an employer become entitled to take a period of 12 months of unpaid parental leave without pay from their employer.
- Annual leave of 20 paid annual leave days per year.
- 10 days of personal leave per year is provided, with this for use when an employee is unfit for work due to illness or family emergency.
- Unpaid community service leave for activities such as voluntary emergency management activities or jury duty.
- Long service leave after a long period of working for the same employer, and this entitlement varies from state to state.
- An entitlement to be absent from work on a day that is a public holiday in their base state of work.
- A set period of termination notice, and redundancy pay depending on years of service.
- Standardised documents on the rights of employees which must be given to any new employee on commencement.

==== Part 2-3: Modern awards ====
The Act created modern awards, which are industrial instruments setting out the minimum terms and conditions of employment in addition to the National Employment Standards. A modern award cannot exclude any provision of the National Employment Standards, but can provide additional detail in relation to the operation of a related entitlement. Modern awards came into effect on 1 January 2010, and apply to all employers covered by the Act.

==== Part 3-1 General protections ====
The Act specifically prohibits employers from taking what is known as 'adverse action' against an employee because of a protected reason.

===== Adverse action =====
Adverse actions can include:

- Dismissal of an employee
- Not giving an employee their legal entitlements
- Changing an employee's job to their disadvantage
- Differential treatment of an employee
- Refusing to hire an employee
- Offering an employee different and unfair working conditions, compared to other employees

===== Protected reasons =====
Employers must not take adverse action against an employee because of:

- Engagement in industrial activity (Such as strike action, or campaigning for better conditions)
- Temporary absence from work due to illness or accident
- Discriminatory reasons (Including age, disability, race, or sex)
- Exercising a workplace right (Such as asking for an unpaid entitlement)

Under the provisions provided in the general protection provisions, a claim of adverse action based on a protected reason must show a direct and substantial link. It is not sufficient merely to claim adverse action on the basis of possessing a protected characteristic and then facing adverse action, as demonstrated in Philip v State of NSW, where an individual applied for a position in the New South Wales police force, and during interviews had been recorded in file notes as having limited English skills, an accent, and was difficult to understand. It was also noted this individual was agitated during the interviews. The individuals refusal of employment was found not to constitute a breach of the general protections provision as the decision was not exclusively based on a lack of English, but also an 'abrasive' attitude.

== Analysis ==
The Australian Constitution plays a fundamental role in the Australian industrial relations system, particularly the Act. As it is legislation of the federal parliament, application of the Act is limited by section 51 of the Australian Constitution, which sets out the division of powers between federal and state parliaments. Prior to 2006, the relevant power relied by governments to regulate Australia's industrial relations system was the conciliation and arbitration power under section 51(xxxv). This led to both federal and state parliaments having the power to legislate with respect to industrial relations, leading to a 'dual system' that had 'unnecessary complexity and technicality'. A federal industrial tribunal would conciliate and arbitrate disputes between trade unions and employers, generally on an industry basis ensuring consistency of conditions within that industry, and the tribunal would deliver its decisions via instruments known as awards.

The Australian Constitution provides no direct power for the Commonwealth Parliament to make laws with respect to industrial relations. Therefore, WorkChoices and the Act rely on the corporations, territory, and external affairs powers. Through a series of decisions, the High Court of Australia has found the parliament has jurisdiction to rely on these constitutional powers to enact industrial legislation, most recently in New South Wales v Commonwealth, also known as WorkChoices decision. However, state parliaments retain the exclusive power for laws with respect to industrial relations not within the scope of these powers, which is any employer not considered a 'constitutional corporation', an employer not incorporated under the Corporations Act, a Commonwealth legislation enacted under the corporations power.
