= List of trade unions in Australia =

This is a list of trade unions in Australia. Trade unions can be registered with the federally-based Fair Work Commission or with an equivalent state-based industrial relations regulatory body. Registration allows a trade union to formally represent members in industrial disputes.

The peak body for unions in Australia is the Australian Council of Trade Unions. Each state and territory of Australia also has an organisation representing trade unions, known as trades and labour councils. Membership of either peak body is not compulsory.

== Current registered trade unions ==
A federally registered trade union is an employee association that has a minimum of 50 employee members and complies with the criteria set out in Section 19 of the Fair Work (Registered Organisations) Act 2009 and related regulation.

The following is a list of Australian trade unions that are formally registered with the Fair Work Commission, as of 23 April 2026:

Union	Abbr.	Sub-Branches	Headquarters	Industries	Founded	Ref.
Australasian Meat Industry Employees Union	AMIEU	AMIEU Newcastle and Northern NSW; AMIEU New South Wales; AMIEU Victoria; AMIEU Queensland, Western Australia, Northern Territory	Adelaide	Meat industry	1906	
Australian and International Pilots Association	AIPA	None	Sydney	Commercial aviation	1981	
Australian Directors Guild Limited	ADGL	None	Sydney	Film and television	1982	
Australian Education Union	AEU	AEU Australian Capital Territory; AEU Northern Territory; AEU South Australia; AEU Tasmania; AEU Victoria; New South Wales Teachers Federation; Queensland Teachers Union; State School Teachers Union of Western Australia	Melbourne	Education	1984	
Australian Federated Union of Locomotive Employees	AFULE	None	Brisbane	Rail transport	1921	
Australian Federation of Air Pilots	AFAP	None	Melbourne	Commercial aviation	1938	
Australian Institute of Marine and Power Engineers	AIMPE	AIMPE Sydney; AIMPE Newcastle; AIMPE Victoria/Tasmania; AIMPE West Australia; AIMPE South Australia; AIMPE Queensland	Sydney	Maritime transport	1906	
Australian Licensed Aircraft Engineers Association	ALAEA	None	Sydney	Aircraft engineering	1964	
Australian Manufacturing Workers' Union	AMWU	AMWU Queensland/Northern Territory; AMWU New South Wales/ACT; AMWU South Australia; AMWU Tasmania; AMWU Victoria; AMWU Western Australia	Sydney	Manufacturing et al.	1852	
Australian Maritime Officers Union	AMOU	None	Sydney	Maritime transport	1889	
Australian Nursing and Midwifery Federation	ANMF	ANMF Australian Capital Territory; New South Wales Nurses and Midwives' Association; ANMF Northern Territory; Queensland Nurses and Midwives Union; ANMF South Australia; ANMF Tasmania; ANMF Victoria; Australian Nursing Federation Perth	Melbourne	Nursing and midwifery	1922	
Australian Principals Federation	APF	None	Melbourne	Education	2006	
Australian Rail, Tram and Bus Industry Union	ARTBIU	RTBU New South Wales; RTBU Queensland; RTBU South Australia/Northern Territory; RTBU Western Australia; RTBU Tasmania; RTBU Victoria	Sydney	Public transport	1861	
Australian Salaried Medical Officers Federation	ASMOF	ASMOF Australian Capital Territory; ASMOF New South Wales; ASMOF Victoria; ASMOF Queensland; South Australian Salaried Medical Officers Association; Tasmanian Salaried Medical Practitioners Society; AMA Western Australia; ASMOF Northern Territory	Sydney	Medical practitioners	1991	
Australian Municipal, Administrative, Clerical and Services Union	ASU	United Services Union New South Wales; Together Queensland; The Services Union Queensland; ASU New South Wales/ACT; ASU Victorian & Tasmanian Authorities & Services Branch; ASU Victorian Private Sector Branch; ASU South Australian & Northern Territory Branch; ASU Western Australian Branch; ASU Taxation Officers' Branch	Melbourne	Clerical and administrative et al.	1911	
Australian Workers' Union	AWU	AWU Queensland & Northern Territory; AWU New South Wales; AWU Victoria; AWU Western Australia; AWU South Australia; AWU Tasmania	Sydney	Various	1886	
Breweries and Bottleyards Employees' Industrial Union of Workers of Western Australia	BEU	None	Perth	Breweries	2010	
Civil Air Operations Officers' Association of Australia	CAOOAA	None	Melbourne	Air traffic control	1948	
Club Managers' Association Australia	CMAA	None	Sydney	Club management	1964	
Communications Electrical and Plumbing Union	CEPU	Communication Workers Union of Australia; Electrical Trades Union of Australia; Plumbing Trades Employees Union	Sydney	Plumbing and Electrical trades et al.	1919	
Community and Public Sector Union	CPSU	Public Service Association of New South Wales; Public Service Association of South Australia; Civil Service Association of Western Australia; CPSU Victoria; CPSU Tasmania	Sydney	Public service et al.	1913	
Construction, Forestry and Maritime Employees Union	CFMEU	Maritime Union of Australia; CFMEU Australian Capital Territory; CFMEU New South Wales; CFMEU Queensland/Northern Territory; CFMEU South Australia; CFMEU Victoria/Tasmania; CFMEU Western Australia	Sydney	Construction et al.	1962	
Salaried Staff United	CSRHSA	None	Brisbane	Employees of CSR, Holcim, Wilmar & Viridian	1942	
Finance Sector Union of Australia	FSU	None	Melbourne	Financial services	1919	
Flight Attendants' Association of Australia	FAAA	None	Sydney	Commercial flight attendants	1956	
Health Services Union	HSU	Medical Scientists Association of Victoria; HSU New South Wales/ACT/Queensland; HSU South Australia/Northern Territory; Health and Community Services Union Tasmania; Health Workers Union Victoria; Health and Community Services Union Victoria; Victorian Allied Health Professionals Association	Melbourne	Health professionals	1911	
Independent Education Union of Australia	IEUA	IEU New South Wales/ACT; IEU Victoria/Tasmania; IEU Queensland/Northern Territory; IEU Western Australia; IEU South Australia	Canberra	Non-government education	1988	
Media, Entertainment and Arts Alliance	MEAA	MEAA New South Wales; MEAA Victoria/Tasmania; MEAA Queensland; MEAA South Australia/Northern Territory; MEAA Western Australia	Sydney	Performing Arts, Media, Journalism et al.	1992	
Mining and Energy Union	MEU	MEU Northern Mining and NSW Energy District; MEU Queensland District; MEU NSW South Western District; MEU Western Australian District; MEU Victorian District; MEU Tasmanian District	Sydney	Mining	1915	
Musicians' Union of Australia	MUA	MUA Adelaide; MUA Brisbane; MUA Hobart; MUA Melbourne; MUA Sydney; MUA Launceston	Adelaide	Music industry	1911	
National Tertiary Education Union	NTEU	NTEU ACT Division; NTEU New South Wales Division; NTEU Northern Territory Division; NTEU Queensland Division; NTEU South Australian Division; NTEU Tasmanian Division; NTEU Victorian Division; NTEU Western Australian Division	Melbourne	Tertiary education	1986	
Police Federation of Australia	PFA	Australian Federal Police Association; Police Association of New South Wales; Police Association Salaried Officers Union of New South Wales; Police Association of Victoria; Queensland Police Union; Police Association of South Australia; Western Australian Police Union; Police Association of Tasmania; Northern Territory Police Association	Canberra	Law enforcement	1942	
Professionals Australia	APESMA	Local Government Engineers’ Association; Professionals Australia ACT; Professionals Australia New South Wales; Professionals Australia Queensland; Professionals Australia SA & NT; Professionals Australia Tasmania; Professionals Australia Victoria; Professionals Australia WA; Game Workers Unite	Melbourne	Science and Technology et al.	1917	
Shop, Distributive and Allied Employees Association	SDAUA	SDA Victoria; SDA New South Wales & ACT; SDA Newcastle & Northern NSW; SDA Queensland; South Australia, Northern Territory & Broken Hill; SDA Western Australia; SDA Tasmania	Melbourne	Retail, Warehousing et al.	1908	
Transport Workers Union of Australia	TWU	TWU New South Wales/ACT; TWU Victoria/Tasmania; TWU Queensland; TWU South Australia/NT; TWU Western Australia; TWU Pilots	Sydney	Private transportation et al.	1928	
Union of Christmas Island Workers	UCIW	None	Christmas Island	Christmas Island workers	1995	
United Firefighters' Union of Australia	UFUA	UFU Australian Capital Territory; UFU Aviation; FBEU New South Wales; UFU South Australia; UFU Tasmania; UFU Victoria; United Professional Firefighters Union of Western Australia	Melbourne	Fire and emergency services	1974	
United Workers Union	UWU	None	Melbourne	Various	2019	
Local Government, Racing and Cemeteries Employees Union	LGRCEU	None	Perth	Local government in Western Australia	2002	

== Other trade unions ==
- Timber, Furnishing & Textile Union
- The Development and Environmental Professionals' Association
- Health Workers Union
- Victorian Allied Health Professionals Association
- The Police Association Victoria
- Ambulance Employees Association of South Australia
- Queensland Professional Firefighters Union
- Fire Brigade Employees Union
- WA Grain Handling Salaried Officers Association
- Western Australian Prison Officers Union of Workers
- Retail and Fast Food Workers Union

== Professional athlete associations ==
- Professional Footballers Australia
- Australian Cricketers' Association
- Rugby League Players Association
- AFL Players Association
- Australian Netball Players' Association
- Rugby Union Players' Association
- Australian Swimmers' Association
- Australian Basketball Players' Association
- Australian Athletes' Alliance

== Former trade unions ==
Union	Founded	De-registered	Reason for de-registration	Ref.
Actors Equity of Australia	1920	1993	Merged with Australian Theatrical and Amusement Employees' Association and Australian Journalists Association to form the Media, Entertainment and Arts Alliance in 1992	
Amalgamated Engineering Union	1852	1973	Merged with the Boilermakers and Blacksmiths' Society of Australia, the Federated Jewellers, Watchmakers and Allied Trades Union of Australia and the Sheet Metal Working Industrial Union of Australia to form the Amalgamated Metal Workers' Union in 1977	
Amalgamated Footwear and Textile Workers' Union of Australia	1987	1992	Merged with the Clothing and Allied Trades Union of Australia to form the Textile, Clothing and Footwear Union of Australia in 1992	
Amalgamated Postal Workers' Union	1925	1992	Merged with the Australian Telecommunications Employees' Association and the Australian Telephone and Phonogram Officers Association to form the Communication Workers Union of Australia in 1992	
Association of Draughting, Supervisory and Technical Employees	1915	1991	Merged with the Amalgamated Metal Workers’ Union to form the Metals and Engineering Workers' Union in 1991	
Australasian Society of Engineers	1890	1991	Merged with the Federated Ironworkers' Association of Australia in 1991 to form the Federation of Industrial Manufacturing and Engineering Employees and incorporated into the Australian Workers Union in 1992	
Australian Boot Trade Employees' Federation	1908	1988	Merged with the Australian Textile Workers' Union to form the Amalgamated Footwear and Textile Workers' Union of Australia in 1988	
Australian Journalists Association	1910	1992	Merged with Actors Equity of Australia and the Australian Theatrical and Amusement Employees' Association to form the Media, Entertainment and Arts Alliance in 1992	
Australian Leather and Allied Trades Employees' Federation	1945	1970	Incorporated into the Federated Miscellaneous Workers' Union of Australia in 1970	
Australian Postmasters' Association	1966	1991	Incorporated into the Australian Postal and Telecommunications Union in 1991	
Australian Railways Union	1920	1993	Merged with the Australian Federated Union of Locomotive Employees, the Australian Tramway and Motor Omnibus Employees' Association and the National Union of Rail Workers of Australia to form the Australian Rail Tram and Bus Industry Union in 1993	
Australian Telecommunications Employees Association	1912	1992	Merged with the Australian Postal and Telecommunications Union to form the Communication Workers Union of Australia in 1992	
Australian Telephone and Phonogram Officers Association	1914	1988	Incorporated into the Australian Telecommunications Employees' Association in 1988	
Australian Textile Workers' Union	1919	1987	Merged with the Australian Boot Trade Employees' Federation to form the Amalgamated Footwear and Textile Workers' Union of Australia in 1987	
Australian Theatrical and Amusement Employees' Association	1910	1993	Queensland branch split and merged with the Australian Workers' Union in 1991, remainder of union merged with Australian Journalists' Association and Actors Equity of Australia to form the Media, Entertainment and Arts Alliance in 1993	
Australian Tramway and Motor Omnibus Employees' Association	1910	1993	Merged with the Australian Federated Union of Locomotive Employees, the National Union of Rail Workers of Australia and the Australian Railways Union to form the Australian Rail Tram and Bus Industry Union in 1993	
Australian Transport Officers' Federation	1927	1991	Merged with the Municipal Officers Association of Australia and the Technical Service Guild of Australia to form the Australian Municipal Transport Energy Water Ports Community & Information Services Union in 1991	
Builders Labourers Federation	1911	1986	Federal registration cancelled by the Hawke government after passing the Builders Labourers' Federation (Cancellation of Registration) Act 1986. The Queensland branch continued as a state-registered union until it merged with the CFMEU in 2014	
Building Workers' Industrial Union of Australia	1911	1991	Merged with the Australian Timber and Allied Industries Union to form the "ATAIU & BWIU Amalgamated Union" in 1991, then merged into the Construction Forestry Mining & Energy Union in 1992	
Clothing and Allied Trades Union of Australia	1907	1992	Merged with the Amalgamated Footwear and Textile Workers' Union of Australia to form the Textile, Clothing and Footwear Union of Australia in 1992	
Commonwealth Bank Officers Association	1930	1994	Incorporated into the Finance Sector Union in 1994	
Communication Workers Union of Australia				
Confectionery Workers' Union of Australia	1925	1992		
Federated Clerks' Union of Australia	1911	1993		
Federated Cold Storage and Meat Preserving Employees Union	1908	1992		
Federated Ironworkers' Association of Australia	1911	1991		
Federated Liquor and Allied Industries Employees' Union of Australia	1910	1992		
Federated Marine Stewards' and Pantrymen's Association of Australasia	1884	1988		
Federated Millers and Manufacturing Grocers Union	1988	1992		
Federated Miscellaneous Workers' Union of Australia	1915	1992		
Federated Moulders' (Metals) Union of Australia	1899	1983		
Federated Rubber and Allied Workers' Union of Australia	1909	1988		
Federated Ship Painters and Dockers Union	1900	1993		
Federated Shipwrights' and Ship Constructors' Association of Australia	1916	1976		
Federated Storemen and Packers' Union of Australia	1912	1988		
Firemen and Deckhands' Union of New South Wales	1901	1993		
Food Preservers' Union of Australia	1898	1992		
Forest Products, Furnishing and Allied Industries Industrial Union of Workers				
Fremantle Lumpers Union	1889	1946		
Funeral and Allied Industries Union of New South Wales				
Manufacturing Grocers' Employees' Federation of Australia	1906	1988		
Maritime Union of Australia	1993	2018		
Marine Cooks, Bakers and Butchers' Association of Australasia	1908	1983		
Marine Motor Drivers and Coxswains' Union of New South Wales	1912	1967		
National Union of Rail Workers of Australia	1938	1993		
National Union of Workers	1989	2019		
New South Wales Typographical Association	1880	1916		
Queensland Shearers Union	1887	1891		
Permanent & Casual Wharf Labourers Union of Australia	1917	1950		
Postal Supervisory Officers' Association				
Printing and Kindred Industries Union	1966	1995		
Professional Divers' Association of Australia	1969	1991		
Professional Radio Employees’ Institute of Australasia				
Pulp and Paper Workers Federation of Australia	1913	1991		
Seamen's Union of Australia	1890	1993		
Textile, Clothing and Footwear Union of Australia	1992	2018		
Telecommunication Officers Association				
Unite Union				
United Voice	1992	2019		
Union of Postal Clerks and Telegraphists				
Vehicle Builders' Employees' Federation of Australia	1863	1993		
Victorian Secondary Teachers Association	1953	1995		
Victorian Women's Post and Telegraph Association				
Waterside Workers' Federation of Australia	1902	1993		
Wool and Basil Workers' Federation of Australia	1890	1976		
Woolclassers Association of Australia	1997	2009		

== See also ==
- Australian labour movement
- Australian Council of Trade Unions
- Deregistered and unregistered Australian unions
