= Deregistered and unregistered Australian unions =

Australian industrial relations law maintains a system of compulsory arbitration in the settlement of industrial disputes between employers, employees, and their respective registered industrial associations. Associations of employers or employees must be registered by the relevant Industrial Relations Commission in order to have disputes heard before that commission. However, in the Fair Work Commission individuals may appoint an unregistered/deregistered industrial organisation to represent them in any disputes.

For a variety of reasons, some industrial associations are not registered under their commission. They may not meet the requirements for registration, may have had their registration revoked, or may have elected not to register.

The following are examples of deregistered (dr) or unregistered (nr) Australian unions that organisations of employee associations or groups which are not registered under State or Federal law as registered employee groups may have occurred due to a range of issues:

- Builders Labourers Federation (dr)
- Federated Ship Painters and Dockers Union (dr)
- Health Workers Union (Queensland)
- Industrial Workers of the World (nr)
- Municipal and Utilities Workers' Union (nr)
- National Jet Systems Pilots Group
- Nurses' Professional Association (nr)
- Queensland Power Workers' Association (now defunct)
- Queensland Prison Officers Association] (QPOA) "Prison Officers working for Prison Officers"
- Retail and Fast Food Workers Union (nr)
- Shearers and Rural Workers' Union (nr)
- Teachers' Professional Association (nr)
- Unite Union (nr)

== See also ==
- Australian Council of Trade Unions
- Australian Industrial Relations Commission
- Australian labour law
- List of trade unions in Australia
