= Australian Telecommunications Employees' Association =

Australian Telecommunication Employees Association
- Merged into: Communication Workers Union of Australia
- Founded: 1912
- Dissolved: 1992
- Headquarters: 343 Little Collins Street, Melbourne
- Location: Australia
- Members: 24,000 (1974)
- Publication: Tele-Technicians Journal
- Affiliations: Australian Council of Trade Unions, state Trades and Labour Councils, Council of Australian Government Employee Organisations, Australian Labor Party, Postal, Telegraph and Telephone International, Amnesty International

The Australian Telecommunications Employees' Association (ATEA) was an Australian trade union representing technical and trades employees in the telecommunications industry from 1912 to 1992. Its members were primarily employed by the Postmaster-General's Department (later Australia Post and Telecom), the Australian Broadcasting Control Board and the Department of Posts and Telecommunications.

== History ==
The union was first established as the Australian Postal Electricians' Union in 1912. In 1926 the union considered amalgamating with the Amalgamated Postal Workers Union of Australia (APWU), however a proposal to conduct a plebiscite of the membership on the question was rejected at the union's annual conference. The union did, however, participate in a joint conference of postal unions in the same year, including the Line Inspectors' Association, Australian Postal Assistants Union, Australian Telegraphists and Clerical Assistants Union, Storemen and Packers Union and the APWU. The union also became a member of the Federation of Postal Unions, but later withdrew from the organisation in 1933, causing it to collapse.

The union was renamed the Postal Telecommunication Technicians' Association in 1943 and by 1966 had a membership of 6,834, of whom 864 were classified as female or junior members. In 1976 the union assumed its final name, as the Australian Telecommunications Employees' Association.

A major dispute arose in the 1970s due to the introduction of new technology by Telecom. Telecom management decided to begin replacing existing electro-mechanical telephone exchange technology with the Ericsson ARE 11 computerised system. As part of the change, management planned to centralise maintenance functions in large Exchange Maintenance Centres (EMCs). The ATEA proposed an alternative arrangement, involving a decentralised maintenance structure that it claimed would retain technical expertise throughout the network, however this was rejected by Telecom management. The ATEA introduced a series of bans on telephone, teleprinter and satellite communication services, aimed at primarily targeting Telecom's large business customers. In response, the Fraser government passed legislation allowing the federal government to order the compulsory redeployment or retirement of government employees.

During the late 1970s the ATEA campaigned against the establishment of Aussat, a proposed communication satellite network to be operated as a public-private partnership.

The union was an active participant in the Australian trade union movement's overseas aid arm, APHEDA. For example, members of the union worked on a project to connect an Eritrean hospital to telephone services. The union also participated in the 'Art and Working Life' program, funded by the Australia Council, hosting an artist-in-residence with the union's Queensland branch in 1985. The program produced a series of posters highlighting the negative impact of technological change on the union's members.

The union was one of the first in Australia to win the nine-day fortnight for its members.

By 1987 the union's membership had increased to 27,800, of whom 99.0% were employed in Telecom, thus making the ATEA the largest of the 28 unions representing Telecom employees. In 1988 the union absorbed the Australian Telephone and Phonogram Officers' Association (ATPOA), adopting the provisional title of the ATEA/ATPOA. It then merged with the Australian Postal and Telecommunications Union (the successor to the APWU) to form the short-lived Communication Workers Union of Australia (CWU) in 1992, with an initial membership of 80,000. The CWU then became part of the modern Communications, Electrical and Plumbing Union of Australia in 1994.
