= ATWU =

ATWU may stand for:

- Amalgamated Textile Workers' Union, in the UK
- Australian Textile Workers' Union
