= Federated Millers and Mill Employees' Association of Australasia =

M.E.A.
- Federated Millers and Mill Employees' Association of Australasia
- Merged into: Federated Millers and Manufacturing Grocers Employees' Association of Australia
- Founded: 1911
- Dissolved: 1988
- Headquarters: Room 4, Second Floor, Victorian Trades Hall, Carlton, Melbourne, VIC
- Location: Australia
- Members: 4,300 (1971)
- Affiliations: A.C.T.U., A.L.P.

The Federated Millers and Mill Employees' Association of Australasia (MEA) was an Australian trade union which existed between 1911 and 1988. The union represented workers employed in milling grain.

== Formation ==
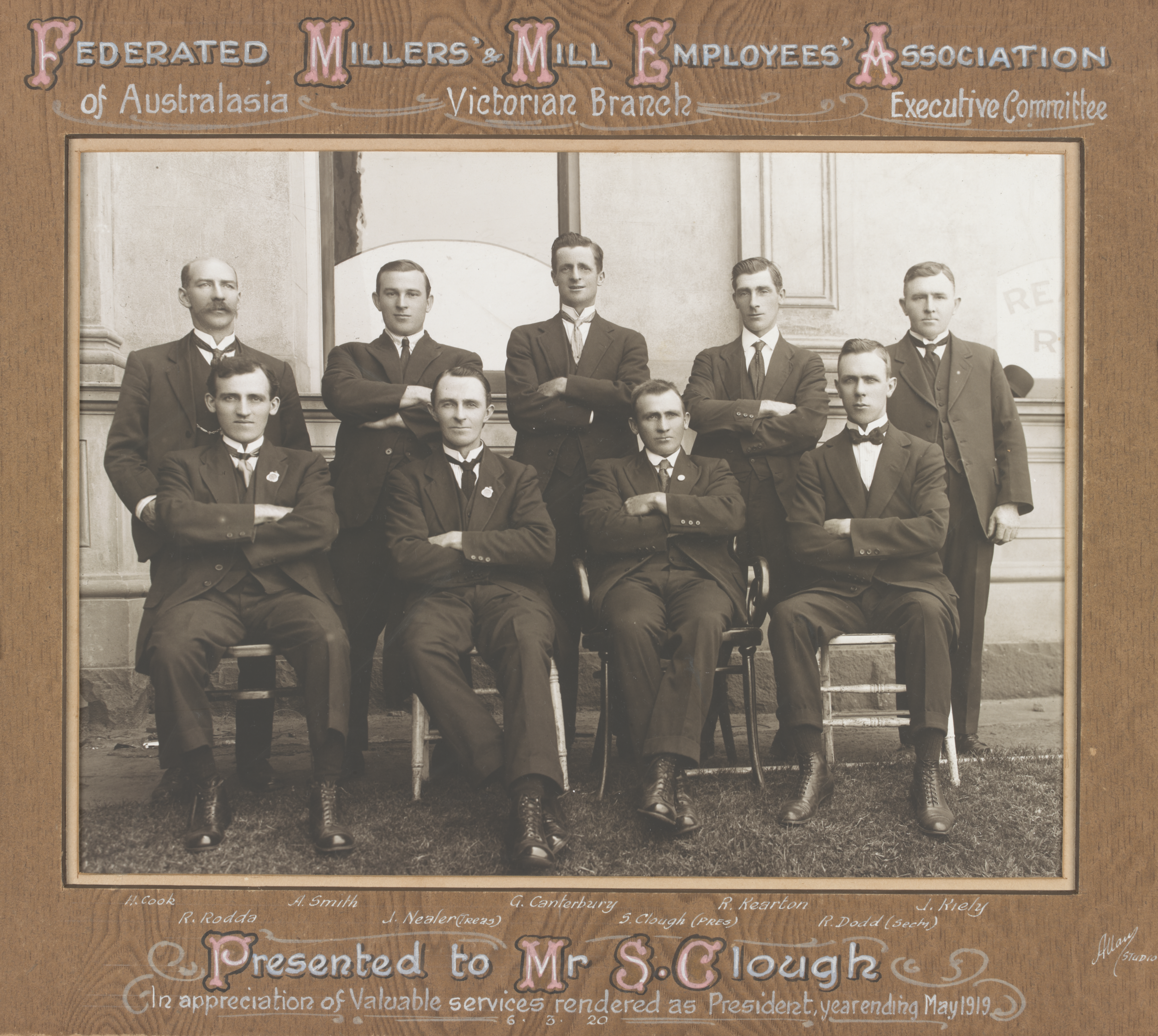
Group portrait of the Victorian branch executive of the union, taken in 1919

The Federation (originally the Federated Millers and Mill Employes' Association) was formed as a result of a meeting in Adelaide in May 1910. At the first annual meeting held in Melbourne in March 1911, the following officers were elected: President, Mr. T. Drum (N.S.W.); vice-president, Mr. W. Bain (S.A.); general secretary, Mr. G. Lewis (N.S.W.); treasurer, Mr. J. Nealer (Vic.); trustees, Frank Condon (S.A.) and J. Kebble. Apologies were received from the Western Australian branch.

== Amalgamation ==
In 1988 the M.E.A. amalgamated with the Manufacturing Grocers' Employees' Federation of Australia to form the Federated Millers and Manufacturing Grocers Union. This union then merged shortly after into the recently formed National Union of Workers.
