= Helen Robertson =

Scottish-born Australian tailor and trade unionist

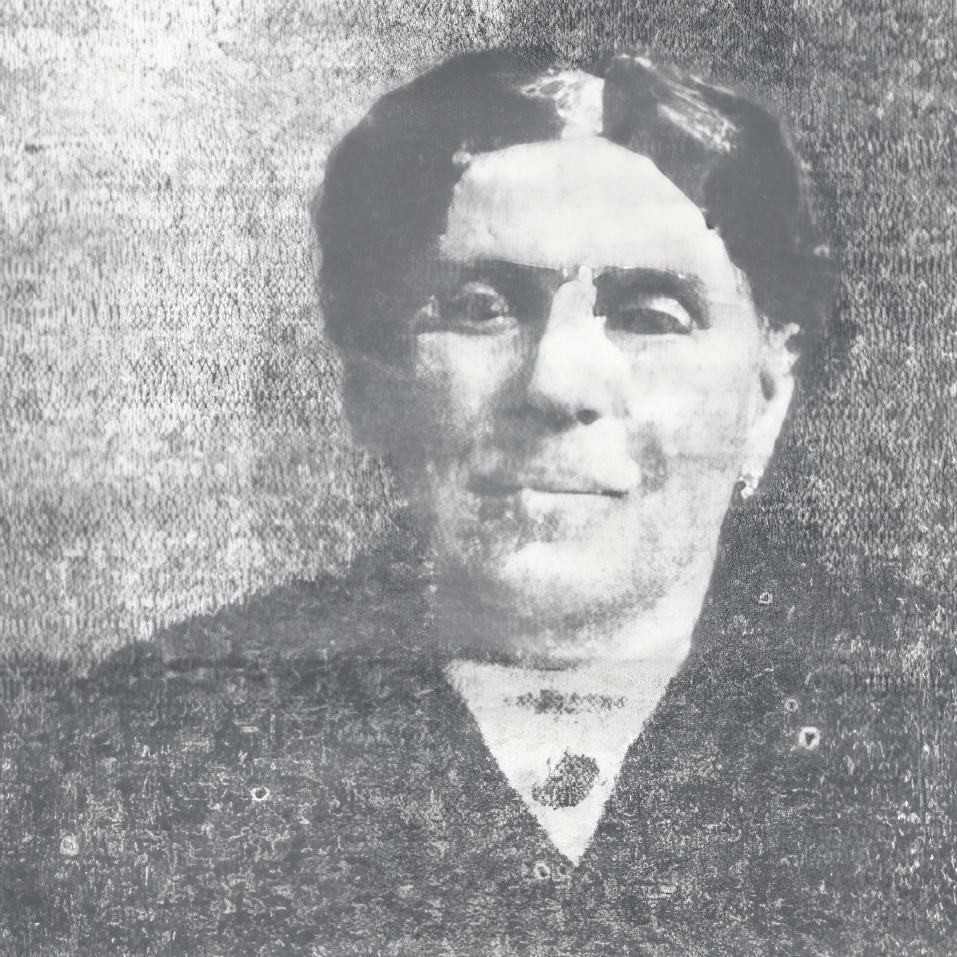
- Born: Helen Lothan Biggs; 1848; Glasgow
- Died: 22 June 1937 (aged 88–89); Collingwood, Victoria
- Occupation: union official
- Spouse: James Stewart Robertson
- Children: three survived

Helen Lothan Robertson born Helen Lothan Biggs (1848 – 22 June 1937) was a Scottish-born Australian tailor and trade unionist. She was involved with creating Australia's first union for women and she led the union's first strike.

== Life ==
Robertson was born in Glasgow. Her parents were Elizabeth (born Baird) and her carpenter husband Joseph Biggs. While she was very young the family emigrated to Australia in 1855. By the age of 14 she was at work. Unskilled workers in Australia could expect to earn about a pound or a bit more each week - unless they were female. Robertson was a textile machinist and she and her peers were paid half the amount paid to an average male worker.

She was a founding member of the Tailoresses Association in 1880. The union gained few members because the underpaid workers were worried that might be blacklisted if they joined a union. The association asked for support from the Trades Hall Council but they were not enthusiastic. However in 1882 they formed a Tailoresses Union with an executive made up of men and Robertson was chosen as one of the seven women on the committee. When a strike was called in 1883 she was a leading player. Quickly the employers gave in to the demands and the women were now earning as much as one pound and ten shillings per week.

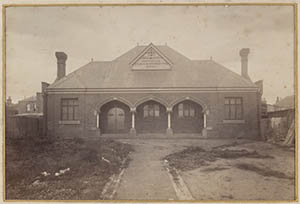
The Female Operatives Hall in Melbourne

She and others arranged for the building of the "Female Operatives Hall" as an addition to the Trades Hall in Melbourne. This was important as women were not allowed to be in many public places. They were not allowed in lounges or bars so the hall was an important meeting place for professional women.

Because of her work with the Eight Hours Committee she was honoured by being elected a life governor. Plaques were mounted on walls to record the honour made to her and four other women. The Tailoresses Union amalgamated with the Tailors Union and that became the Clothing and Allied Trades Union of Australia. Robertson attended her last meeting of that union's executive in 1909.

== Death and legacy ==
Robertson died in the Melbourne suburb of Collingwood in 1937.

In 2023 visitors to the Victorian Trades Hall on the Feminist Hall Tour had their attention drawn to three important figures: Zelda D'Aprano, Gwen Goedecki and Helen Robertson.

== Private life ==
In 1870 she married James Stewart Robertson, who was a carpenter like her father. They had six children, and three survived to adulthood.
