= WAA =

Waa or WAA may refer to:

== Companies and organizations ==
=== Airlines ===
- West African Airlines, a Beninese airline
- Westair Aviation, a Namibian airline

=== Government agencies ===
- Waffenamt, a research and development agency of Nazi Germany
- War Assets Administration

=== Others ===
- Western Association of Architects, a defunct professional body
- Wiltshire Air Ambulance, serving Wiltshire, England
- Women's Action Alliance, an American feminist organization
- Workers Alliance of America, an American political organization
- World Archery Asia
- Woolclassers' Association of Australia
- Wreaths Across America, American nonprofit organization

== Other uses ==
- Crow (Australian Aboriginal mythology)
- Namatahi Waa (born 1990), New Zealand rugby union player
- Wa (unit), a Thai unit of length
- Wales Airport (Alaska)
- Walla Walla language
- Wealth attained advantage, an econophysics model of the rich get richer and the poor get poorer
- The Waa river in the Netherlands
