= Erskineville Bootmaking School =

Trade school in Sydney, Australia

- Erskineville (1906–1940); Ultimo (1940–2009); Australia

Information
- Former names: Boot and Shoe Trades School; Department of Footwear
- Type: Trade school
- Established: 26 April 1906
- Closed: 2009
- Authority: Sydney Technical College

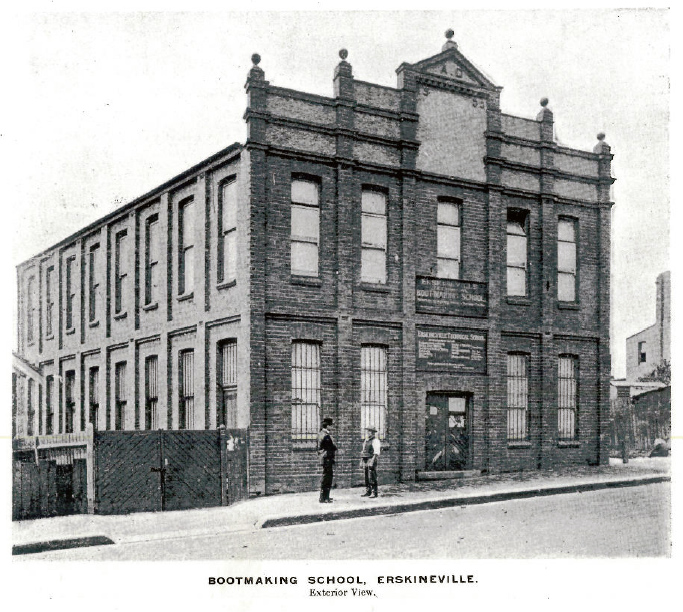
The Erskineville Bootmaking School in 1909.

The Erskineville Bootmaking School was one of a collection of trade schools established by the Sydney Technical College in the early years of the twentieth century. The schools had been recommended in the report of a Royal Commission into Education known as the Knibbs-Turner Report (1905), named after the two commissioners who had written it, George Knibbs and John William Turner. Among 231 recommendations, the establishment of trade schools for teaching technical education was one that was taken up.

== Foundation ==
In April 1906 a former boot factory in Erskineville was leased by the Ministry of Public Instruction, to be used for a bootmaking training school. Formerly the factory of Mr FJ Walters and his Anchor Shoe Brand, the two-storey brick factory came with a gas engine and shafting machines ready for use. Mr H Lewis was appointed as the instructor and although classes began, there was no complete fit-out of machinery, so tuition was restricted to clinking (cutting the leather for uppers) and basic instruction. While the school awaited machinery, students were given access to machines in the York Street showrooms of the Singer Sewing Machine Company.

The opening lectures were held on the evening of Thursday, 26 April 1906, and included a speech by Mr Louden, chairman of the Manufacturers' Association, who praised the Technical Education Branch for establishing the school which would be of great benefit to the industry. The increasing mechanisation and commercialisation of footwear manufacturing encouraged the industry to support the trade school.

In February 1908 the Bootmaking School was officially opened with a formal ceremony attended by the Mayor of Erskineville, Alderman Robinson, the New South Wales Minister for Education, the Hon JA Hogue, and the Director of Technical Education, JW Turner, as well as various trade representatives, factory owners, students, parents and other interested parties. Despite the wait between securing the factory and opening the school, those present at the opening praised the result. Mr CP Nielsen of the Centennial Shoe Company was delighted to see that the school had been provided with the latest machinery and equipment. Speaking on behalf of the industry, he expressed its hopes for the school's success for the industry's benefit, and offered any support necessary to see this achieved. A great deal of the success was attributed to JW Turner who, recognising the modern requirements of the industry, had taken steps to secure a full plant of equipment. It is worth noting that not only had Turner been the joint author of the Royal Commission report that had started the process in 1905, but he was also the son of a shoemaker from Parramatta.

The new school was fitted with 18 machines supplied by the United Shoe Machinery Corporation which allowed for a full session of courses to begin. The course included two years' instruction over five subjects: Pattern-cutting; Clicking; Blake Machine; Goodyear Welted; and Finishing, with the curriculum covering both the theory and principles behind shoemaking and the practical application of the knowledge. The school also sought to teach the mechanics of the various machines being used, so as to give the students a basic knowledge in the workings of the plant.

== Training and teaching ==
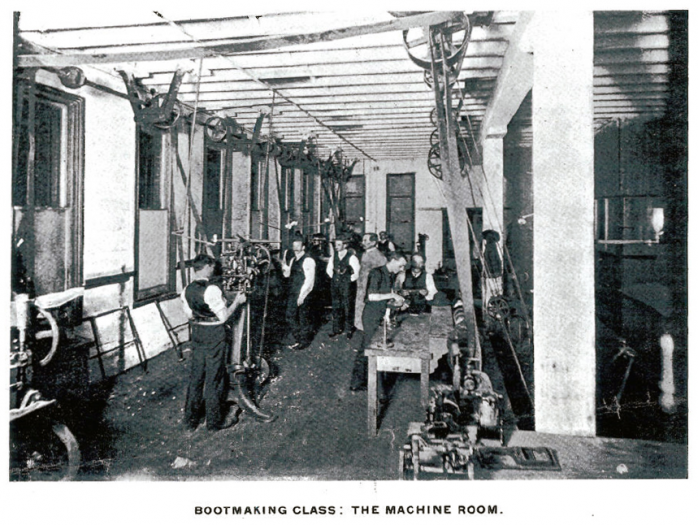
Bootmaking class in the school (1909).

One of the advantages of the new Bootmaking School, which had not been immediately considered, was its role in the teaching of apprentices in the trade. In 1909, Justice Henry Bourne Higgins in the Court of Arbitration handed down a judgement for the Australian Boot Trade Employees Federation covering wages, weekly working hours and the training of apprentices. As part of the judgement it was set out that apprentices were required to learn at least one of seven functions, including use of the machines used in the factories and bootmaking processes. Many employers were concerned that the number of machines and journeymen needed to teach the apprentices would be difficult to maintain while still running a profitable business. Recognising this, the Bootmaking School reminded those employers in a series of articles and advertisements that they had the latest machinery and qualified instructors who could teach apprentices in all aspects of the trade, thus satisfying Justice Higgins's demands.

In 1913 the system of technical education in New South Wales was reorganised. The trade schools, such as the Bootmaking School and the tanning and leatherwork school in Waterloo, were given particular attention. Meetings between the Director of Education, Peter Board, the Superintendent of Technical Education James Nangle and industry representatives were held throughout 1913 to determine what those in the various industries saw as the important aspects and opportunities of technical education.

For the Bootmaking School it was decided that the practical tuition could be enhanced by getting students to actually make boots and shoes on a small scale through a series of government contracts. With a view to putting this into practice, the machinery at the school was updated, with the Singer Sewing Machine Company donating much of the new plant. In 1914 the first order was for 1,600 pairs of police boots, an urgent order that was too small to be of much practical teaching use but did show the capabilities of the school. In 1915 a much larger order was received for 10,000 pairs of military boots, which some suggested was the beginnings of the school becoming a de facto state boot factory. However, while the orders were big enough to employ the 50–60 enrolled students on long-term projects, they were never large enough to be of much more than educational use. For a short while, however, a trade in the production of show uppers for prisoners and the state Children's Relief Department was bringing in £5,000 per annum. The school continued to trade commercially on a small scale until 1927 and filled small government contracts into the 1940s.

== Returned soldiers ==
In 1916 the school joined with other branches of the Technical College in taking returned soldiers as part of a repatriation program. Training was offered free of charge to returned and disabled soldiers, with fees covered by the Commonwealth. By September 1919 approximately 40 men had been trained in some aspect of bootmaking (with 20 going on to employment in the industry) and another 30 receiving instruction at Erskineville in that year. Ex-servicemen were given instruction until they were considered 40 per cent proficient, at which time they were placed in jobs in the industry. Once employed, the employers paid 40 per cent of their wages, with the rest being covered by the Commonwealth. The subsidy decreased as their skill level increased until employers covered the full basic wage. The scheme continued into the early 1920s.

== The new school ==
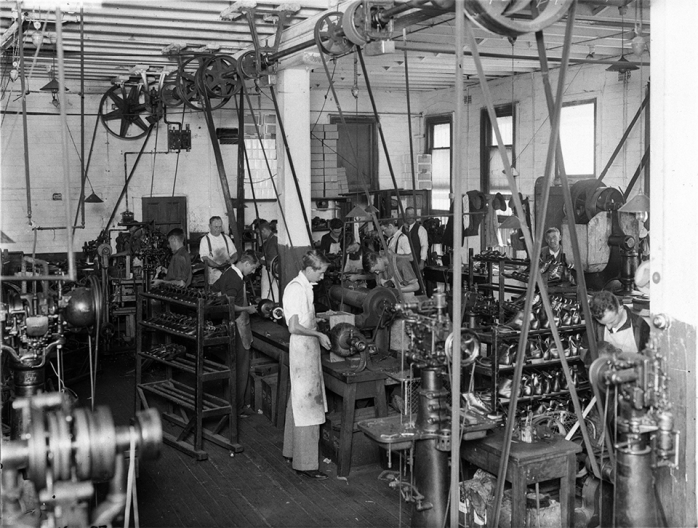
Students making boots in the school in March 1933.

Although the school was supported by the industry, pressure grew through the 1920s and into the 1930s for the provision of a new, modern building. The old boot factory in Erskineville was only ever considered a temporary measure and by the late 1920s it was too small to hold the number of students attending. Throughout the 1930s pressure mounted on the department to provide better facilities, with each new development being reported in industry and trade journals. A site was procured by 1935 and plans drawn up by 1936 but no new buildings were erected until 1940 when a new bootmaking school was built on the campus at Ultimo as part of a larger consolidation of the Technical College facilities. The new building was three storeys, allowing for the different aspects of the trade to be separated, with the top floor dedicated to lecture rooms alone.

The new bootmaking school was one of three new trade school buildings erected at Ultimo, the other two being Electrical Engineering and Engineering Trades. The official opening of the school in June 1940 was attended by industry members, employers, staff and students. It was noted that there were 340 students in training at the school with another 130 due to start. Amongst the students were a number of female students who had been admitted to the school from 1937, principally as machinists. Women machinists had worked at the school prior to this although they do not appear to have been admitted as students.

With new facilities and updated machinery, the renamed Boot and Shoe Trades School lifted enrolments to a record of 440 in 1946, including 151 journeymen who were furthering their education. Following World War II, returned servicemen were once again taught as part of the repatriation scheme, with 54 trained and placed by October 1946. These classes had started in 1943 with an intake of 24 students, mainly involved in hand-making classes.

In 1949 the Boot and Shoe Trades School was renamed the Department of Footwear and continued to teach out of Ultimo until 2009. With class sizes down from 135 in 2005 to 73 in 2009, classes were suspended.
