= Wool and Basil Workers' Federation of Australia =

Australian trade union

- Merged into: Australian Workers' Union
- Founded: 1890
- Dissolved: 1976
- Headquarters: 73 Belmont Road, Tingalpa, QLD
- Location: Australia
- Members: 1250 (1971)
- Affiliations: A.C.T.U., A.L.P.

The Wool and Basil Workers' Federation of Australia was an Australian trade union which existed between 1890 and 1976. It represented workers employed in scouring and carbonising wool, fellmongery, and the processing of sheep hides into basil (tanned sheepskin).

== History ==
The union was first established in 1890, before achieving federal registration in 1912, as the Amalgamated Fellmongers, Woolsorters and Woolscourers' Union of Australia. In 1918, the union changed its name to its final form.

John Dacey, a Sydney coachmaker and Member for Botany, where the fellmongering industry was concentrated, helped to organise the Wool and Basil Workers' Union in Sydney. The South Australian trade union leader and later politician Theo Nicholls served as part-time secretary of the union in South Australia, and was active in its organisation.

The Wool and Basil Workers Union was involved in a demarcation dispute with the Australian Textile Workers' Union in 1913 over work done at Botany woollen mills. The dispute was settled following arbitration by the Labour Council.

The Wool and Basil Workers' Union merged with the Australian Workers' Union in 1976.

== See also ==
- List of trade unions in Australia
