= Tailoresses' Association of Melbourne =

Trade union in Victoria, Australia

- Successor: Federated Clothing Trades Union of the Commonwealth of Australia
- Established: 1880
- Dissolved: 1907
- Type: Trade union
- Headquarters: Melbourne, Victoria
- Region served: Victoria
- Key people: Helen Robertson (executive committee, 1882–1909); Duncan McIver (president of the executive, 1882); Ellen Creswell (vice-president, later president)
- Affiliations: Melbourne Trades Hall Council

The Tailoresses' Association of Melbourne, also known as the Tailoresses' Union, Victorian Tailoresses' Union and the Tailoresses' Association of Victoria, was a trade union formed by and for women working in Melbourne's clothing trade. It is generally regarded as the first trade union in Australia formed exclusively by women. Founded in 1880 by Helen Robertson and fellow tailoresses in response to poorly paid piecework, the union was formally established in December 1882 with the backing of the Melbourne Trades Hall Council. It led a strike in early 1883 that won improved pay and conditions from Melbourne clothing manufacturers. It merged with other unions in 1907 to form the Federated Clothing Trades Union of the Commonwealth of Australia, a body known today, after further amalgamations, as the Clothing and Allied Trades Union of Australia.

== History ==
Melbourne's clothing factories paid tailoresses by the piece rather than by the hour, and rates fell as manufacturers adopted sewing machines that let unskilled women outproduce hand tailors. By the early 1880s a tailoress could expect to earn roughly half the wage of an unskilled male labourer. Helen Robertson, who had started work as a machinist at fourteen, joined fellow tailoresses in 1880 to form the Tailoresses' Association, an early attempt to organise against the underpayment and poor conditions known at the time as "sweating". The association attracted few members. Many workers feared being blacklisted by employers for joining a union, and an approach to the Melbourne Trades Hall Council for support went largely unanswered.

Public attention shifted in late 1882, after newspaper coverage of sweated conditions in the clothing trade prompted the Age to open a fundraising appeal that raised £1,000 in its first week. On 10 December 1882, Robertson and other tailoresses, backed by the Tailors' Union, put their case to a deputation at Trades Hall. The Trades Hall Committee resolved the next day, 11 December, to establish a Tailoresses' Union under a governing executive of men with a separate committee of seven women, Robertson among them. Duncan McIver, a Scottish-born tailor and that year's president of the Trades Hall Committee, moved the successful motion in the Melbourne Trades Hall Council for the union's formation, and became president of its executive. At a mass meeting of some four to five hundred tailoresses on 15 December 1882 — the date later commemorated as the union's founding — the tailoress Ellen Creswell moved the motion that formally constituted the union, seconded by a Miss Cass, and was elected to its committee as representative of the trouser hands.

== The 1883 strike ==
The union's first major test came in February 1883, when the manufacturer Beith, Schiess & Co attempted to cut piece rates and did not respond to the union's counter-demands. A strike followed on 15 February 1883. Workers returned to individual factories as each employer agreed to the union's terms, and by March 1883 most manufacturers involved in the dispute had accepted a revised schedule of rates and conditions. Robertson gave evidence to the royal commission subsequently appointed to investigate sweating in the clothing trade, in August 1883; Creswell, who served on the union's strike committee, had already given evidence to an earlier 1882 royal commission on factories.

The dispute is generally credited with contributing to the establishment of a Shops Commission and to Victoria's Factory Act of 1885, although that Act did not adopt all of the recommendations the March 1884 royal commission made regarding outwork conditions.

== Female Operatives' Hall ==
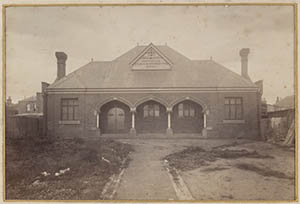
Female Operatives Hall in Melbourne.

Following the strike, union members, with Robertson among them, helped establish the Female Operatives' Hall behind Trades Hall on Lygon Street. It was one of the few public meeting spaces that was open to working women, who were barred from many hotels, lounges and bars of the period.

== Amalgamation and legacy ==
Creswell became the union's vice-president, a position she held into the mid-1880s, and according to the union's Labour Australia biographical entry later served as its president. She represented the union as a delegate to the Intercolonial Trades Union Congress in Sydney in October 1885, and was last recorded speaking against the sweating system at a union meeting in 1889.

The Tailoresses' Association (by then commonly known as the Tailoresses' Union) held joint meetings with the Tailors' Trade Protection Society from 1905, and in 1907 merged with that body, the Victorian Clothing Operatives' Union and several interstate unions to form the Federated Clothing Trades Union of the Commonwealth of Australia. Through further renames in 1922, 1924 and 1947, that body is known today as the Clothing and Allied Trades Union of Australia. Robertson continued as a delegate of the successor union, attending her final executive meeting in 1909.

On the centenary of its founding, 15 December 1982, a commemorative plaque was unveiled at the Clothing and Allied Trades Union building in Carlton by Pauline Toner, Victoria's first woman Cabinet minister, describing the union as "pioneers in the continuing struggle to abolish sweated labour in the clothing industry". The union's founding and the 1883 strike were also the subject of the 1983 documentary For Love or Money: First women's union.

== See also ==
- Helen Robertson
- Ellen Creswell
- Duncan McIver
- Clothing and Allied Trades Union of Australia
- Victorian Trades Hall
