= MGU (disambiguation) =

MGU is the Moscow State University (Russian: Московский государственный университет имени М. В. Ломоносова, romanized: Moskovskiy gosudarstvenn'y universitet imeni M. V. Lomonosova, МГУ, MGU).

MGU may also refer to:

- Mahatma Gandhi University, Kerala
- Manufacturing Grocers' Employees' Federation of Australia
- Most general unifier, in computer science
