= Federated Millers and Manufacturing Grocers Union =

- Federated Millers and Manufacturing Grocers Employees' Association of Australasia
- Merged into: National Union of Workers
- Founded: 1988
- Dissolved: 1992
- Location: Australia

Federated Millers and Manufacturing Grocers Union was an Australian trade union. It represented workers in food processing and manufacturing industries.

== Formation ==
The Federated Millers and Manufacturing Grocers Union was formed through the amalgamation of two pre-existing unions, the Federated Millers and Mill Employees' Association of Australasia and the Manufacturing Grocers' Employees' Federation of Australia. Both unions represented relatively small memberships, and amalgamated as part of a period of union rationalisation encouraged by the ACTU.

== Amalgamation ==
The new union did not last long as a separate entity, and in 1992 it amalgamated with the recently formed National Union of Workers. The new union was formed from several pre-existing organisations, the largest and most influential being the Federated Storemen and Packers Union.
