= Earl Setches =

Australian trade unionist

Earl Setches is an Australian trade unionist.

He is associated with the trade union that covers Australian plumbers, known as the CEPU; of which he is the national assistant secretary. Within that union he is the federal secretary, and Victorian state secretary, of the PPTEU division.

== Career ==
Setches is known for being a political ally of Bill Shorten, within the national right-faction of the ALP. Shorten assisted Setches politically in 2015 after a branch-stacking scandal emerged in the press regarding the use of gift cards to pay for ALP memberships on behalf of the union.

In December 2022 Setches made headlines after a physical confrontation with another trade unionist at a Christmas party function hosted by Maurice Blackburn. The other person involved in the confrontation was Mem Suleyman, who prior to the incident had cut Setches and other political allies out of power-sharing arrangements with other Labor factions.
