= Musicians' Union of Australia =

The Musicians' Union of Australia (MUA), formerly Professional Musicians' Union of Australia, is a trade union covering a range of occupations in the music industry in Australia. it was founded in March 1911. In some records over its early years it was also referred to as the Musicians' Union of Australasia.

== History ==
Several bodies were precursors to the Musicians' Union of Australia:

- The Professional Orchestral Benefit Association, founded in 1897 was renamed the Professional Musicians' Benefit Association of Australasia on 10 April 1899, and again on 8 July 1901, to the Professional Musicians' Association of Australasia (PMAA).
- The Professional Orchestral Musicians' Union of Australia and the PMAA together created the Amalgamated Musicians' Union of Australasia in August 1902, but the PMAA continued to exist as a separate body.
- After handing over an agreed amount of money to the recently formed Professional Musicians' Union of Australasia on 8 April 1907, the PMAA was dissolved on 9 September 1907, with its assets transferring to the Professional Musicians' Club (which had been registered as an association with limited liability on 11 June that year).

The body was registered as a trade union on 13 March 1911. The word "Professional" was dropped from the name at some point before 1912, although both Musicians' Union of Australasia and its final form, Musicians' Union of Australia, exist in records until around 1916. In August 1961 the union was renamed the Professional Musicians' Union of Australia, reverting to its original name in 1975.

The organisation was made up of state districts, some of which were further divided into smaller branches. Western Australia only formally joined the union in March 1962, although it did send representatives to some of the meetings in the early years.

== Description ==
The Musicians' Union of Australia (MUA) represents musicians, music librarians, copyists, composers, vocalists and musical arrangers. It states that it does not represent "the interests of managers, agents, venues, publishers and record companies", but solely those of musicians. It provides advice on matters such as copyright, minimum award rates, and contracts.

The MMUA was affiliated with the ACTU, the Victorian Labor Party, NSW Labor Party and Western Australian Labor Party and the International Federation of Musicians (FIM), although as of 2021 these are not mentioned on its website, and the FIM website lists the MEAA as member organisation for Australia.

There are branches in Melbourne, Sydney, Adelaide, Hobart, Launceston and Brisbane.

== Governance ==
The governing authority of the organisation is its Federal Council, comprising the federal office-bearers and the members of all Branch Committees. It is also governed by a Federal Executive. The federal office-bearers and members of the branch committees are elected every three years, with elections across the organisation conducted by the Australian Electoral Commission.
