= Commonwealth Bank Officers Association =

Australian trade union (1930 to 1993)

The Commonwealth Bank Officers' Association was an Australian trade union, comprising staff of the Commonwealth Bank. It was established in 1930 and continued until 1993 when combined with another sector union to form the Finance Sector Union in a wider process of union amalgamation in Australia at that time.

In its middle years, at the end of World War II, the CBOA encountered tension in leadership as was also happening at the same time in the Federated Ironworkers Association. Laurie Short of the FIA and Walter Argall President of the CBOA appeared in the Commonwealth Court of Conciliation and Arbitration on the same day in 1949 and both secured their positions from challenges from the left. The CBOA succeeded also before the Arbitration Commission in securing the first post-war white collar wage increase for bank staff, ahead of the Commonwealth Public Service. Argall remained the patron of the CBOA until his death in 1987.
