= Third Intercolonial Trades Union Congress =

The Third Intercolonial Trades Union Congress was a meeting of trade union delegates held in Sydney, Australia in October 1885, succeeding congresses in 1879 and 1884. It was the first of these congresses to have representatives from every colony, except Western Australia, and every trade and industry. It had 99 delegates, including two delegates representing the Victorian Tailoresses Union, who were the first women at a congress. The unions involved claimed a membership of 150,000. It passed resolutions calling for the establishment of a federation of unions, the introduction of tariff protection, the introduction of payment of members of parliament, the extension of the franchise to sailors, the exclusion of Chinese labour (foreshadowing the White Australia policy) and the abolition of assisted immigration. The report of the congress was written by John Norton.
