= Plumbing Trades Employees Union =

PPTEU
- Plumbing and Pipe Trades Employees Union
- Founded: 1911; 115 years ago
- Headquarters: Carlton, Victoria
- Location: Australia
- Key people: Glenn Menzies, Federal President; Earl Setches, Federal and State Secretary; Andy Wallace, Federal and State Assistant Secretary; Paddy McCrudden, Federal and State Assistant Secretary
- Parent organization: CEPU
- Website: www.ppteu.asn.au

The Plumbing and Pipe Trades Employees Union is a trade union in Australia. It is a division of the Communications, Electrical and Plumbing Union of Australia. The union was originally formed through the amalgamation of state-based unions in Victoria, South Australia and Queensland in 1911. The federal union was initially known as the Australian Plumbers and Gasfitters Employees Union. The union amalgamated with the Electrical Trades Union of Australia and the Communication Workers Union of Australia in the 1990s to form the Communication, Electrical and Plumbing Union of Australia.
