= Manufacturing Grocers' Employees' Federation of Australia =

Manufacturing Grocers' Union
- Manufacturing Grocers' Employees' Federation of Australia
- Merged into: Federated Millers and Manufacturing Grocers Employees' Association of Australia
- Founded: October 1906
- Dissolved: 1988
- Headquarters: Room 41, Victorian Trades Hall, Carlton, Melbourne
- Location: Australia
- Members: 3,500 (in 1979)
- Affiliations: A.C.T.U., Victorian T.L.C., A.L.P., I.U.F.

Manufacturing Grocers' Employees' Federation of Australia (M.G.U.) was an Australian trade union existing between 1906 and 1988. The union was first established as the Federated Candle, Soap, Soda & Starch Employees' Union of Australia, before changing its name in 1914. The union represented workers employed in manufacturing grocers' sundries and non-edible grocery products, particularly in the southern states of South Australia and Victoria. In 1988 the union amalgamated with the Federated Millers and Mill Employees' Union to form the Federated Millers and Manufacturing Grocers Employees' Association of Australia, which in turn merged with a number of unions to form the National Union of Workers.

== Activities ==
The Manufacturing Grocers' Union undertook a wide variety of activities to pursue the interests of its members. The union made representations to government and the public in favour of protectionist measures to ensure the competitiveness of products manufactured in Australia with international imports. The M.G.U. also publicised the poor working conditions of its members, including problems such as noise, dust and physical fatigue.

=== Industrial disputes ===
The Manufacturing Grocers' Union underwent several bitter industrial disputes during its history, including a number of strikes. The first major strike the union was involved in was in April 1916, when the M.G.U., along with a number of other unions, participated in a sympathy strike with the Storemen and Packers' Union over the dismissal of several men at a Parsons' Brothers factory in Melbourne. The strike lasted for several months and led to shortages of several products in Victoria, due to blockade of goods by the employers. The strike eventually collapsed in June 1916, with all strikers returning to work.

The Manufacturing Grocers' Union held another major strike in 1948 at the match factories of Bryant and May, in Richmond, Melbourne, over an increase in the required daily output of matches. The dispute was resolved when all parties agreed to allow the Commonwealth Statistician determine a fair daily output per worker.

=== Demarcation disputes ===
The Manufacturing Grocers' Union made efforts to establish a branch of the union in New South Wales, the most populous state of Australia, but this attempt was thwarted by the Australian Workers' Union, who represented the relevant workers at the time.

== Notable members ==
Two members of the union were long-serving members of the Senate, elected on the Australian Labor Party ticket in South Australia – Theo Nicholls (1944–1968) and Arnold Drury (1959–1975).

== Amalgamation ==
In 1988, the Manufacturing Grocers' Union amalgamated with the Federated Millers and Mill Employees' Union, another small union representing workers in food processing. The resulting body, the Federated Millers and Manufacturing Grocers Employees' Association of Australasia, was short-lived and subsequently amalgamated with the National Union of Storeworkers, Packers, Rubber and Allied Workers to form the National Union of Workers.
