= Australian Maritime Officers Union =

Maritime trade union in Australia

AMOU
- Australian Maritime Officers Union
- Founded: 1904
- Headquarters: 52 Buckingham Street, Surry Hills, Sydney, NSW
- Location: Australia
- Members: ▼2,540 (as at 31 December 2024)
- Affiliations: ACTU, ITF, QCU
- Website: www.amou.com.au

The Australian Maritime Officers Union (AMOU) is an Australian trade union that is registered with the Australian Industrial Relations Commission (and additionally registered in Queensland, New South Wales and Western Australia) and affiliated with the Australian Council of Trade Unions. Its membership covers mariners as well as professional, administrative, supervisory and technical employees in the maritime industry and dependent services. The AMOU uses the services model of trade unionism.

The AMOU National Office is located in Sydney, NSW. The National executive are:

- President: Captain Matt Jepson
- National Vice President: Brent Warhurst
- National Delegates: Ken Blackband, Brent Middleton, John Macdonald, Ryan Thornton.
- Offshore Divisional Delegates: Wayne lewis
- private Port Services Delegate: Terry Johnston
- Seagoing delegate:Mitchell Ellicott
- Towage Delegate:Jarrod Healy
- Marine Pilot delegate: Ben Miers
- Ferries and tourism: Ian Hughes
- Port Services Delegate:Darryl Dorron

The Australian Maritime Officers Union has previously published a journal called the Maritime Officer.

== History ==
The AMOU traces its roots to the formation of the Mercantile Marine Officers' Association in the 1880s. The MMOA was one of the key unions involved in the 1890 Australian maritime dispute that began on 15 August 1890 and ended when members returned to work on the employers' terms in November 1890.

A general meeting of the MMOA on 12 February 1904 changed the name of the union to Merchant Service Guild of Australasia. The Guild registered under the Commonwealth Conciliation and Arbitration Act on 5 May 1905, the first registered federal employee organisation to do so. On 3 September 1957 the union changed its name to the Merchant Service Guild of Australia.

In 1976 it took over coverage of sea-going shipwrights, previously represented by the Federated Shipwrights and Ship Constructors Association of Australia. The Australian Maritime Officers Union was formed in 1993 with the merger of the Merchant Services Guild and the Australian Stevedoring Supervisors Association.

== Publications ==
- Australian Maritime Officers Union (1990), The Australian maritime officer : journal of the Australian Maritime Officers Union, The Union
