= Amalgamated Footwear and Textile Workers' Union of Australia =

Australian trade union (1987–1992)

A.F.T.W.U.
- Amalgamated Footwear and Textile Workers' Union of Australia
- Merged into: Textile, Clothing and Footwear Union of Australia
- Founded: 1987
- Dissolved: 1992
- Location: Australia

Amalgamated Footwear and Textile Workers' Union of Australia was a short-lived Australian trade union, which existed between 1987 and 1992. The union represented workers employed in the manufacture of textiles as well as footwear and felt hatting products.

== Formation ==
The Amalgamated Footwear and Textile Workers Union was formed in 1987 through the merger of the Australian Textile Workers' Union and the Australian Boot Trade Employees' Federation.

== Amalgamation ==
In 1992 the union finalised a merger with the Clothing and Allied Trades Union of Australia to form the Textile, Clothing and Footwear Union of Australia. It is industry union for all workers in the apparel industry.
