= Actors Equity of Australia =

Australian trade union 1920–1993

Actors Equity of Australia was an Australian trade union representing actors and other performers. It existed from 1920 to 1993.

== History ==
The organisation was established as the Actors' Federation of Australasia in January 1920 under the Federal Arbitration Act, after initial registration issues from the Theatrical Proprietors and Managers' Association in October 1919. The inaugural office holders were president Walter Baker and secretary Charles Dunn. One of its first acts was to make theatrical profession members aware of salaries to be at standard rate of pay when working outside of Australasia, as exchange rates may be less. In June 1920, it applied to have the Australian Vaudeville Artists' Federation to be deregistered as it was a defunct body.

An employment award was proposed in February 1923 for minimum pay for each performance and rehearsal of five shillings; but for Sydney, Melbourne, and Adelaide, no less than £2 in any week. For members of the ballet or chorus, men £5, women £4, actors £5 5s, actresses £4 15s; and no more than eight performances in a week, or twelve vaudeville revues in a week. Public holidays would be time-and-a-half, and Sundays, Good Friday, and Christmas Day paid at double rates.

By February 1930, it was suggested by Equity that 10% of all talking pictures ("talkies") programmes be Australian made, as 33% of all takings for renting a talkie was sent back to the US.

After the October 1933 meeting, the president was Mr R. Conway, vice-presidents Dame Sybil Thorndike (stage actor) and Messieurs Lewis Casson (actor and theatre director) and E. Pitcher, vice-president and Victorian representative Mr A. S. Hodge, vice-president and travelling representative Mr. W. R. Heaton (from Wellington, NZ), with general secretary Mr Bertie Wright (silent film actor). Support was given in February 1934 to establish a quota system for Australian-made films, to help local production and employment of artists and associated bodies.

The organisation was renamed Actors' Equity of Australia after an application in January 1936. In July 1936, a new employment award was sought for actors and actresses salary of £10 a week, chorus and ballet of £7 10s, and £5 for extra women, mannequins, and show girls. Casual engagements for actors and actresses should be £3 3s for each performance, and £2 2s for chorus and ballet.

The organisation was renamed Actors and Announcers' Equity of Australia after March 1945, following the collapse of the Announcers' Association of Australia. The Announcers' Association was registered in December 1938 after some delays.

In 1946, Equity allowed 25% of imported variety acts and dramatic programmes, and up to 75% for ballet, while maintaining employment of Australian actors; Equity was estimated to have 2000 artists at this time.

In September 1946, ventriloquist Eric Valentine's doll 'Monty' was signed up as an honorary member of Equity.

In 1948, Equity sought to promote theatrical schools, with organisational membership eventually to require a degree from a school.

The organisation was renamed and reverted to the Actors' Equity of Australia name in 1983. It ceased to exist in 1993, when it merged with the Australian Theatrical and Amusement Employees' Association and the Australian Journalists' Association to form the Media, Entertainment and Arts Alliance.

== Victorian communist inquiry (1949) ==
In the 1949 Victorian Royal Commission Inquiring into the Origins, Aims, Objects and Funds of the Communist Party in Victoria and Other Related Matters, it was suggested by Cecil Sharpley that, although his evidence was later found unreliable, "Actors Equity was not under Communist control, although Mr Hal Alexander, general secretary, and Mr Dick Diamond, Victorian secretary, were both Communists". In August 1949, during the Royal Commission, there was a members' expressing a vote of continuing confidence in both Alexander and Diamond. In October 1949, actress Patricia Kennedy was one of six witnesses to claim "strange faces" at a June 1948 meeting.

== Notable alumni ==
- Dick Diamond (1906–1989), playwright and journalist. He was the Victorian state secretary in 1945, and protested about British and US transcripts flooding Australian radio and bringing a "threat to the further development of our national culture and artistic talent". About the same time, there was a push to limit the number of overseas actors working in Australia, to ensure Australian jobs.
- Patricia Kennedy (1916–2012), well-known radio actress.
- Hal Lashwood (1915–1992), actor and comedian. He was a key figure in its establishment and its president for 25 years.
