= Shearers and Rural Workers' Union =

Shearers and Rural Workers' Union (SRWU)
- Founded: Born 1886. Reborn 1994.
- Type: Australian Trade Union
- Location: Ballarat, Australia
- Key people: National General Secretary – Bernard Constable

The Shearers and Rural Workers' Union is an Australian industrial union that is not registered with the Fair Work Commission and is also not affiliated with the Australian Council of Trade Unions.

They formed on 1 May 1994 in Victoria when members of the Australian Workers' Union split away due to the declining membership of the AWU; the increase in AWU dues; and, a perceived anti-democratic bureaucracy in the AWU.
