= Australian Boot Trade Employees' Federation =

Former Australian trade union

A.B.T.E.F.
- Australian Boot Trade Employees' Federation
- Merged into: Amalgamated Footwear and Textile Workers' Union of Australia
- Founded: 1908
- Dissolved: 1988
- Headquarters: 485-489 Queensberry Street, North Melbourne, VIC
- Location: Australia
- Members: 18,000 (1952)
- Affiliations: ACTU, ALP, International Textile, Garment and Leather Workers Federation, Textile Workers' Asian Regional Organisation

The Australian Boot Trade Employees' Federation (ABTEF) was an Australian trade union which existed from 1908 to 1987. The union represented all workers employed in footwear manufacturing in Australia.

== Formation ==
The ABTEF was formed through the amalgamation of several smaller state-based and craft unions in the footwear industry, such as the New South Wales Clickers' Association and the New South Wales Boot Operators and Rough Stuff Cutters' Union.

== Amalgamation ==
The domestic footwear industry went into steep decline in the 1970s and 80s due to the removal of tariffs, and competition from cheap imported products from Asia. This led to a rapid decline in the Australian industry's workforce, and consequently the membership of the ABTEF. The ABTEF, therefore, began seeking amalgamation with other unions in kindred industries, before gradually amalgamating with the Australian Textile Workers' Union in 1988 to form the Amalgamated Footwear and Textile Workers' Union of Australia. The new body also underwent amalgamation shortly thereafter to form the Textile, Clothing and Footwear Union of Australia.
