= Unite Union (Australia) =

Trade union

Unite
- Unite
- Founded: 2006
- Headquarters: Melbourne, Victoria
- Location: Australia
- Key people: Anthony Main, secretary
- Website: www.unite.org.au

Unite is a former trade union established in Melbourne, Australia, which now describes itself as a 'young workers' campaign group'. Unite was never registered as a union under the Fair Work Act 2009. Its inspiration was the Unite Union in New Zealand.

When it was a union, Unite's goal was said to be to organise young workers in fast food and retail in Victoria. Its establishment in 2006 angered the union with registered coverage of these workers, the Shop, Distributive and Allied Employees Association (SDA). It argued that having a rival union would create disunity when the focus should have been on John Howard and WorkChoices, the controversial labour laws that had been introduced at that time, but which have since been abolished. Michael Donovan, Victorian SDA Secretary, said the "...SDA is the union to look after the interests of young people in the retail industry and fast-food industry..."

Unite was critical of the SDA's negotiated workplace agreements that reduced wages to below the Award rate.

Unite announced its decision to cease calling itself a trade union on 30 December 2016, and the decision was said to take effect from 1 January 2017. This decision was due to the creation of the Retail and Fast Food Workers Union, a new union created for more or less the same purpose as Unite – namely, to act as a more progressive alternative to the SDA – but which Unite acknowledged was better-resourced than it.
