= Funeral and Allied Industries Union of New South Wales =

F&AI
- Funeral And Allied Industries Union Of New South Wales
- Headquarters: Sydney, New South Wales
- Location: Australia
- Key people: Lyle Pepper, president Aiden Nye, secretary
- Affiliations: ACTU

The Funeral And Allied Industries Union Of New South Wales (F&AI) was a trade union in Australia. In 2018 it amalgamated with the Australian Workers Union (AWU). It was affiliated with the Australian Council of Trade Unions.
