= Marine Motor Drivers and Coxswains' Union of New South Wales =

Marine Motor Drivers and Coxswains' Union
- Marine Motor Drivers and Coxswains' Union of New South Wales
- Merged into: Firemen and Deckhands' Union
- Founded: 1912
- Dissolved: 1967
- Location: Australia

Marine Motor Drivers and Coxswains' Union of New South Wales was an Australian trade union existing between 1912 and 1967. The union represented workers employed as linesmen, coxswains, and driving motor boats carrying cargo or passengers.

== Industrial Disputes ==
As well as agitating for improvements in its members' pay and conditions through the Conciliation and Arbitration systems, the union also worked to maintain the high standard of skill amongst workers in the industry.

== Amalgamation ==
The Marine Motor Drivers and Coxswains' Union suffered from demarcation disputes with other maritime union, such as the Masters and Engineers' Association and the Firemen and Deckhands' Union of New South Wales(FDU), before finally amalgamating with the FDU in 1967. Don Henderson, of the FDU, would later acknowledge that a large part of the FDU's motivation in seeking amalgamation with the Marine Motor Drivers and Coxswains was the vital position of the linesmen, represented by the latter union, in port operations. The linesmen's role in securing moored ships meant they could halt all docking of ships in the event of an industrial dispute.
