= Forest Products, Furnishing and Allied Industries Industrial Union of Workers =

The Forest Products, Furnishing and Allied Industries Industrial Union of Workers was a trade union in Western Australia.

In 1907, the Amalgamated Timber Workers' Union of West Australia was formed as the first united timber industry union for the entire state of Western Australia. It succeeded the Amalgamated Sawmill Employees' Union of Workers, which had united the timber unions of the south-west in 1906. It merged into the Australian Timber Workers' Union in 1918, becoming their No. 5 branch. In 1927, the branch broke away from the federal union as the West Australian Timber Workers' Industrial Union of Workers, resulting in litigation over the union's assets, eventually resolved in the state union's favour.

The union was deregistered in October 1933 and three separate bodies attempted to apply for registration in its place, including a section of the Australian Workers' Union. In December, the West Australian Sawmilling and Sleeper Cutters' Industrial Union of Workers was registered. It was again renamed as the Western Australian Timber Industry Industrial Union of Workers in 1937. The union adopted its final name much later.

It merged into the Australian Workers' Union in 2012.

A number of prominent political figures, including John Holman, May Holman and Peter O'Loghlen, held offices in the union during its heyday.
