= Federated Shipwrights' and Ship Constructors' Association of Australia =

Shipwrights' Union
- Federated Shipwrights' and Ship Constructors' Association of Australia
- Merged into: Amalgamated Metal Workers & Shipwrights Union
- Founded: 1916
- Dissolved: 1976
- Location: Australia
- Members: 1500 (1976)

The Federated Shipwrights' and Ship Constructors' Association of Australia was an Australian trade union which existed between 1916 and 1976. It represented shipwrights and boatbuilders in the shipbuilding and ship repair industries, as well as sea-going shipwrights aboard vessels in the merchant navy.

== History ==
Shipwrights were one of the first craft groups to be organised after the settlement of Australia, with the Shipwrights United Friends Society formed in 1829 to represent shipwrights in Sydney (then part of the Colony of New South Wales). Other unions were soon formed in the other colonies, including the Port Phillip Shipwrights Society, the Port Adelaide Shipwrights Society and the Brisbane Shipwrights Provident Union, while the Sydney union was renamed the Shipwrights Provident Union of New South Wales. After federation these small, local unions amalgamated to form a national organisation, which was registered federally in January 1916 as the Federated Shipwrights of Australia. Just a few months later, in September 1916, it changed to the Federated Shipwrights' Ship Constructors' & Boat Builders' Association of Australia. By the end of 1917, in what was a tumultuous period, the union had changed again, this time to the Federated Shipwrights Ship Constructors Naval Architects Ships Draughtsmen and Boat Builders of Australia. The union operated under this name until 1933 when it succumbed to a further name change: the Federated Shipwrights’ & Ship Constructors’ Association of Australia.

The union published a journal titled Slipway.

Operating until December 1976, the Federated Shipwrights’ & Ship Constructors’ Association amalgamated with the Amalgamated Metal Workers’ Union to form the Amalgamated Metal Workers’ & Shipwrights’ Union. At the time of the merger 247 of the approximately 1,500 members of the Shipwrights Association were employed as sea-going shipwrights (also known as ship's carpenters). As the various maritime unions objected to the AMWU expanding its coverage to ships' crews, these members were instead transferred to the Merchant Service Guild (later renamed the Australian Maritime Officers Union), with the transfer completed by 1978.
