= Firemen and Deckhands' Union of New South Wales =

- Merged into: Seamen's Union of Australia
- Founded: 1901
- Dissolved: 1993
- Headquarters: 289 Sussex Street, Sydney
- Location: Australia
- Members: 718 (1973)

Firemen and Deckhands' Union of New South Wales (FDU) was an Australian trade union existing between 1901 and 1993. The union covered deckhands employed on ferries, tugs, launches, lighters and hoppers, as well as enginemen, wharf hands, turnstill hands, change hands, firemen, motorboat coxmen and assistants. The FDU operated a closed shop, with all labour in the industry provided to employers through the union.

== Industrial Disputes ==
The first major strike action conducted by the union was the Sydney Ferry Strike of 1913, when approximately 350 workers employed by various private ferry companies in Sydney Harbour went on strike for six days as part of a campaign for the 48 hour week. The union won the dispute, following the intervention of the Minister for Labour and Industry, Campbell Carmichael and the strong support received from the ferry employees and other unions. Prior to the construction of the Sydney Harbour Bridge the ferry system was a vital component of the city's travel system, and the strike caused serious transportation problems. The strike coincided with a number of bitter industrial disputes, and furthered conflict between the industrial and political wings of the Labor movement.

The Firemen and Deckhands' Union became involved in a dispute between BHP and the Seamen's Union of Australia (SUA) in 1972, over the replacement of Australian-crewed ships with those manned by foreign crews on coastal iron ore routes. FDU members working on tugs in Port Kembla refused to assist the Iron Somersby in berthing in the port. The FDU, along with a number of other maritime unions, also boycotted a chartered foreign flagship, the Texaco Skandinavia, which Caltex attempted to employ on domestic routes. Both disputes resulted in union victories, with the Texaco Skandinavia failing to carry a single cargo.

The Firemen and Deckhands Union also participated in the imposition of Green Bans on the demolition of historic buildings in The Rocks area of Sydney, then slated for redevelopment into high-rise office blocks. The Rocks has a strong working-class, maritime history, which was preserved through the initiative of a number of unions, the first time such an action had been taken.

== Amalgamation ==
Throughout its history the Firemen and Deckhand's Union underwent a number of amalgamations with other unions covering the maritime industry, including incorporating members of the Ferry and Tugboat Employees' Union and the Coxswain and Drivers Union. The FDU amalgamated with the Seamen's Union beginning with the establishment of a single national tugboat award in 1976, and finally ending in the NSW branch's amalgamation into the Maritime Union of Australia (the successor to the SUA).

== Politics ==
Despite being classed as a generally left of centre union, the FDU did not subscribe to the socialist politics of some other maritime unions, including the Waterside Workers' Federation and the Seamen's Union. The ideological difference with the latter of these unions did cause some friction, and was an obstacle to amalgamation in the industry. The union was supportive of Australia's involvement in the First World War, and criticised the Sydney Labor Council for its opposition to the war effort. The FDU was also supportive of the government during the 1949 Australian coal strike, allowing foreign cargo ships carrying coal to berth in Sydney and Melbourne.

Later, during the 1960s the union moved further to the left, and became involved in a number of political boycotts, aimed at putting pressure on foreign regimes by restricting their trade with Australia. These included boycotts of Greek ships, on the issue of the military coup in Greece in 1967. The FDU was also strongly active in the anti-apartheid boycotts of the late 20th century, and sent a delegate to the first legal meeting of the African National Congress in 1991.

The General Secretary of the FDU was Don Henderson (1963–1984) and later John Garrett (1984–1993).
