= Medical Scientists Association of Victoria =

- Abbreviation: MSAV
- Formation: 1980
- Type: Trade union
- Headquarters: Melbourne, Victoria, Australia
- Parent organization: Health Services Union Victoria No. 4 Branch
- Website: msav.org.au

The Medical Scientists Association of Victoria (MSAV) is a specialist union founded in 1980 that represents the interests of scientists including dietitians, audiologists, perfusionists, medical physicists, research scientists and genetic counsellors employed in both the public and private sectors in Victoria, Australia. The MSAV negotiates terms and conditions of employment with employers on behalf of its members. The MSAV is a component Association of the Health Services Union of Australia (HSU) Victoria No.4 Branch.
