= Australian Telephone and Phonogram Officers Association =

Defunct union

- Merged into: Communication Workers Union of Australia
- Founded: 1914
- Dissolved: 1992
- Headquarters: 343 Little Collins Street, Melbourne
- Location: Australia
- Members: 9,749 (1977)
- Publication: The Telephone Echo

The Australian Telephone and Phonogram Officers Association was an Australian trade union representing telephonists, phonogram operators and telex service operators in the Australian Public Service. It existed from 1914 to 1992.

== Formation and first award ==
The first decade of the Postmaster-General's Department after Federation in 1901 saw a period of dire working conditions, punitive management and wage stagnation for telephonists, amidst a background of departmental mismanagement that resulted in a 1908 Royal Commission. Gender-segregated state telephonist unions emerged in New South Wales, with the male-only New South Wales Telephone Exchange Association (1903) and the Women Telephone Attendants' Association (1907), while the Victorian Women Public Servants' Association organised female public servants in Victoria.

The first national union, the General Division Telephone Traffic Officers Association, was formed in July 1914 at a meeting of telephonists and officers at Rubira's Cafe in Bourke Street, Melbourne, in order to secure salary increases after years of wage stagnation. It won federal registration in December 1914. It was renamed the Commonwealth General Division Telephone Officers Association in 1915, and held its first national conference in 1916. The second conference in 1917 resolved "that no political, sectarian or other improper debate be allowed at Association meetings or in Association rooms.”

The union began preparing a case for a federal award covering telephone exchange employees in 1916, which was successful in 1917. The award led to significant wage increases, although less than the union had claimed, but rejected claims regarding working hours and rest breaks that led to disputes for years thereafter. The period saw a significant internal dispute between the federal executive and the New South Wales branch over perceived Victorian dominance of the union and the award claim. The union won a further increase in 1918. In 1917, Woman Voter described the intransigent attitude of the Public Service Commissioner in their dealings with the union regarding pay rises for women in the General Division compared to areas of the public service with fewer women employees, as well as noting the lack of opportunities for promotion afforded to women in the area. A union journal, The Telephone Echo, began publication in early 1918.

The union clashed with the federal government over the course of 1919 over poor working conditions, initially requesting an inquiry into poor working conditions and then publicising a list of their grievances to be put before parliament. Postmaster-General William Webster responded dismissively to their grievances in October 1919, leading to an angry public response from the union. A mass meeting of 200 workers in Sydney on 5 November 1919 resolved to "abide by the regulations to their letter" until their grievances were met, beginning the next day, and Melbourne workers followed on 9 November. Webster, while lashing the workers' action, expedited requested extra staff and facilities.

== 1920s advocacy ==
In 1920, amidst the preparation of a new case to limit working hours, another serious dispute emerged between the federal executive and the New South Wales branch as to the precise hours to be included in the claim, leading to the New South Wales branch undermining the eventual federal claim by conveying a different position to the Arbitration Court and not making payments to the federal union. The resulting decision led to very limited improvements to women's wages, limited improvement to hours well short of what the union had claimed, and a decrease in the period between rest breaks. In the aftermath, the federal executive suspended the New South Wales executive and appointed an interim executive. The federal executive considered expelling or disaffiliating the New South Wales branch, but the dispute was resolved at a unity conference in October 1921.

A further case to the Public Service Arbitrator (which had been established in 1920) in 1924 won telephonists in the central exchanges in Sydney, Melbourne, Brisbane and Adelaide a 34-hour week and decreased working hours at other exchanges, but failed in a strong push for equal pay between men and women and limitations on the amount of work expected to be performed. The Public Service Arbitrator remarked that "one is ashamed that the Government who ought to be a model employer has lagged so far behind" in the working conditions of the telephonists. The union worked with other public service unions on broad issues throughout the 1920s, but resisted proposals to amalgamate with the postal service unions.

In 1924, the union was renamed the Commonwealth Telephone Officers Association. In that year, the New South Wales branch celebrated "the best award the union has ever had", noted an improved financial position, and a "considerable increase" in membership. However, internal divisions between the federal executive and the New South Wales branch in 1924-26 saw a federal attempt to set up a "No. 2 branch" in New South Wales and an internal inquiry into the pre-existing state branch, strongly resisted by the pre-existing NSW leadership, who in turn refused to pay affiliation fees to the federal union. The disputed continued, with two branches in New South Wales, until a unity conference in 1928.

The union was hampered by the introduction of automatic telephones from the late 1920s, replacing manual exchanges. Combined with the impact of the Great Depression, this saw substantial job losses and an accompanying decrease in union membership. Although the union had won some protection for temporary workers hired as part of the transition away from manual exchanges in the late 1920s, many of these workers lost their jobs during the Depression, and the union's demand for permanency for those workers after the Depression was limited. Rickertt (2006) suggests that from this time the union leadership began to focus more on the interests of supervisors and was less concerned about the interests of lower-level workers who had seen massive job losses. During the late 1930s, the union pursued the right for women to retire at 55 with according superannuation arrangements. In 1937, the union won a reduction in hours at many exchanges, as well as increased rest breaks at country exchanges.

== World War II and post-war years ==
A militant leadership won control of the New South Wales branch in 1941 under communist Alice McLean and existed alongside the more conservative federal executive for several years. A further claim for equal pay in 1942 was unsuccessful and later that year, with the pressure of the deployment of male employees during World War II, the union agreed to overcome their longstanding opposition to women's night work without concessions on equal pay or other issues, over the strong opposition of the New South Wales and Queensland branches. The backdown led to the widespread introduction of night shift work for women telephonists. There were labour shortages during the latter stages of war, as poor wages, conditions and night shift work, compared to higher wages substituting for roles formerly filled by men, saw many women telephonists resign.

After years of supporting other unions in pursuing a basic wage and pursuing amalgamation with other New South Wales public service unions, a process resisted by the federal executive, the militant New South Wales leadership was ousted in 1946–47, and the union banned Communists from membership in 1949. The union was a party to broader arbitration cases in 1947-48 which won penalty rates for weekend and night shift work and campaigned for an end to night shift work for women after the war, eventually won in 1951, but also supported the maintenance of the bar on employing married women, temporarily relaxed during the war, in preference to the interests of unmarried women.

In 1950, the union changed its name to the Commonwealth Telephone & Phonogram Officers Association after a successful application for the union to cover male phonogram officers in 1949. The 1950s saw continued labour shortages and high turnover of workers, while the union leadership tended to be long-serving members working in supervisory roles, with some shared interests with management. Wage increases in union claims fell below inflation, little country organising took place, and both union membership and finances went into substantial decline. The ouster of the radical New South Wales leadership in 1946-47 did not stop the conflict between the federal executive and the New South Wales branch, as the new leadership again warred with the federal body and the federal body again attempted to suspend the state executive in 1952–55.

Escalating automation into the 1960s led to many redundancies, particularly in country areas, which met with little opposition, although the union stepped up its recruitment efforts to try to address the declining membership. The union split on the issue of workplace surveillance of telephonists in 1964, allowing the practice to be rolled out. The union won a general pay increase in 1965, but in 1967 pursued gains for supervisors above lower-level telephonists, resulting in much smaller advances for lower levels. The union was divided on pursuing equal pay in the 1960s and did little to actively campaign, with a sticking point for the union being their staunch opposition to married women in the workforce. Employment of married women was permitted in 1966 over the union's objections. The union did engage with other unions in the landmark 1969 equal pay case, which notionally meant equal pay for women telephonists, but led to the department freezing men's pay until the women caught up instead, the union's compliance in this angering male union members.

== Revitalisation ==
By 1969, the union's membership had fallen to 4,848, its lowest in decades. The Amalgamated Postal Workers Union attempted to apply to cover their rival union's workers, then launched a recruitment campaign instead. In 1973, the union underwent a reorganisation, establishing a permanent federal office and appointing an executive officer rather than relying on the part-time federal executive. The union journal, The Telephone Echo, was re-established from 1974. The five-day week and four weeks annual leave were both won, following gains in other industries. A wage increase in 1973 came at the cost of the union revoking their opposition to night shift and part-time work.

The union's membership rebounded following the lifting of the ban on married women, rising to 9659 in 1974. In early 1975, the union launched its first industrial action, a brief ban on night shift and part-time work. In 1974, the union negotiated its first redundancy agreements. During this period, the union sought to distance itself from management after many years of close co-operation. One aspect of this was reform to their handling of member workplace complaints; whereas during the years of supervisor-dominated leadership these complaints had often been taken to their direct supervisor, risking retaliation, the union adopted practices widespread elsewhere of raising complaints at a higher level. In 1975, the Postmaster-General's Department was broken up, and the telephone system (and the union's workforce) split off into the new entity of Telecom. In the same year, the union adopted its final name of the Australian Telephone and Phonogram Officers Association.

Through the second half of the 1970s, the union shifted from its historical opposition to industrial action and public campaigning. A clause on industrial action was inserted in the union's constitution in 1976, and in that year alone the union threatened industrial action over pay rates for working on holidays, concerns regarding amenities and staffing at a new Telecom facility in the Sydney CBD, and requirements for staff to promote Telecom services, winning some concessions from Telecom. In 1977, the union refused to staff a new Telecom facility in Queensland over staffing arrangements. Several state branches increased their efforts to support members in regional areas dealing with substantial job cuts, sending union leaders to visit and supporting members in regional towns willing to take industrial action, resulting in a series of unpopular decisions being overturned. The New South Wales and Queensland branches ran a large-scale campaign against country exchange closures during the same period, which delayed many closures, while the union also improved redundancy arrangements for workers.

In July 1979, the union resolved to pursue a 20% across-the-board pay increase backed up by the threat of industrial action, reflecting wage stagnation that had caused telephonists to fall behind pay levels in other previously equivalent careers. In March 1980, after Telecom refused increases, the union held stopwork meetings in three states, deciding to refuse from 24 March to take procedural steps in handling STD calls which would result in cheaper rates for callers, which met with a furious and threatening response from Telecom. The union ceased the action on 1 April after securing a hearing that month for their wages claim and a guarantee from Telecom that they would drop proposed retaliation against workers involved. The decision on the wage claim, handed down in June 1980, resulted in a wage increase, if one that was less than half the union's original claim.

In 1981, the union pursued a new wage claim to address continued wage stagnation, and when Telecom refused to negotiate, organised national stopwork meetings in all states on 30 September 1981. The union pursued a mix of bans and stoppages in different states from 7 October to 14 October, when they suspended action after Telecom agreed to negotiate. The dispute resulted in a 10.2% increase, supported by all states except Queensland. In 1982, the union won the installation of noise limiters after issues with high-pitched noises that had damaged the hearing of as many as 4000 staff, and in response to issues of repetitive stress injury forced a series of adaptations.

== Decline and amalgamation ==
From 1979 to 1983, the union was involved in a sprawling dispute about Telecom's efforts to centralise their facilities and the consequences of those decisions on staffing, pay and conditions. The dispute repeatedly split state branches of the union in how to respond, with Queensland repeatedly seeking to take a more militant approach involving industrial action. Telecom ploughed ahead with drastic restructuring anyway, announcing over 2000 job losses in June 1983. The union commenced industrial action, taking a range of measures that would cost Telecom, from 23 June to 1 July 1983, when it ceased after Telecom agreed to cease all job cuts until 31 January 1984 with the possibility of extension to provide assistance in obtaining alternative employment for manual exchange workers, and to undertake a joint study of possible ways of maintaining member employment. In February 1984, the union overwhelmingly accepted an agreement with Telecom that set out Telecom's employment commitments and pledged to advise the union of future changes.

The union's leadership had been historically opposed to amalgamation over decades, but had engaged in discussions with the Postal Telecommunication Technicians' Association (later the Australian Telecommunications Employees' Association) during the 1970s. By the mid-1980s, facing ever-declining jobs and membership in spite of the 1984 agreement, amalgamation had taken on a renewed necessity and urgency. Discussions regarding amalgamation with the Australian Telecommunications Employees' Association commenced in earnest and the unions formally amalgamated on 1 April 1988, adopting the provisional title of the ATEA/ATPOA. The amalgamated union then underwent a further merger to become the Communication Workers Union of Australia in 1992.
