= Australian Textile Workers' Union =

A.T.W.U.
- Australian Textile Workers' Union
- Merged into: Amalgamated Footwear and Textile Workers' Union of Australia
- Founded: 1919
- Dissolved: 1987
- Headquarters: Victorian Trades Hall, Lygon Street, Carlton, VIC
- Location: Australia
- Members: 35,000 (1976)
- Affiliations: ACTU, ALP, International Textile, Garment and Leather Workers' Federation

The Australian Textile Workers' Union (ATWU) was an Australian trade union which existed from 1919 to 1987. The ATWU represented Australian workers employed in the manufacture of textiles, including the spinning, weaving, dyeing and finishing of all types of fibres. Later, the union also represented workers employed in manufacturing felt hatting.

== Formation ==
The ATWU was formed in 1919 following the deregistration of the General Textile Workers' Federation of Australia in the same year. The Australian Textile Workers' Union was reregistered in 1984 following the union's merger with the Federated Felt Hatting and Allied Trade Employees' Union of Australia.

== Amalgamation ==
In the 1970s and 1980s the number of workers employed in the Australian textile industry declined significantly due to automation, and increased competition from foreign goods, due to tariff reductions. This led to a decrease in the membership of the ATWU, and the union began seeking amalgamation with other trade unions in the apparel industry. In 1987 the union finalised amalgamation with the Australian Boot Trade Employees' Federation, creating the Amalgamated Footwear and Textile Workers' Union of Australia. This new body subsequently amalgamated with the Clothing and Allied Trades Union to form the Textile, Clothing and Footwear Union of Australia, which continues to represent workers in the Australian textile industry.
