= Federated Cold Storage and Meat Preserving Employees Union =

F.C.S.M.P.E.U.
- Federated Cold Storage and Meat Preserving Employees' Union of Australasia
- Merged into: National Union of Workers
- Founded: 1908
- Dissolved: 1992
- Headquarters: Room 2, 3rd Floor, Victorian Trades Hall, Carlton, Melbourne, VIC
- Location: Australia
- Members: 6,700 (in 1979)
- Affiliations: ACTU, ALP, IUF

The Federated Cold Storage and Meat Preserving Employees' Union (FCSMPEU) was an Australian trade union which existed between 1908 and 1992. The union represented workers employed in refrigeration, and the production of ice, dairy products, preserved meat, fish, game and poultry in the southern states of Victoria, Tasmania and South Australia. The union was initially known as the Cold Storage Union of Victoria before changing its name in 1915. The union maintained 100 per cent membership, and most workplaces were closed shops.

== Amalgamation ==
The union began seeking to amalgamate with unions representing workers in similar industries in the 1970s, partly as a result of automation reducing employment in the industry, and initially favoured merging with the Food Preservers' Union and the Australasian Meat Industry Employees Union. The union eventually amalgamated in 1992 with the newly formed National Union of Workers.
