= Australian Theatrical and Amusement Employees' Association =

Australian trade union 1910–1993

ATAEA
- Australian Theatrical and Amusement Employees' Association
- Merged into: Media, Entertainment and Arts Alliance
- Founded: 1910
- Dissolved: 1993
- Location: Australia
- Members: 13,700 (1991)
- Affiliations: ACTU, ALP

The Australian Theatrical and Amusement Employees' Association was an Australian trade union which existed between 1910 and 1993. It represented a wide range of workers employed in the entertainment industry in Australia.

== Coverage ==
The ATAEA represented employees in a diverse range of non-performing occupations in the entertainment industry. These included film projectionists, ushers, ticket sellers, film crew, stagehands, racecourse, sports ground and amusement park staff.

== Formation ==
While a state-based union may have existed in Victoria during the late 19th century, the union first achieved federal registration in 1910 as the Australian Federated Stage Employees' Association. The union underwent several name changes before finally settling on its final title in 1915. The ATAEA originally only represented stagehands, but over time, and with technological change, it widened its membership base to cover much of the entertainment industry in Australia.

== Amalgamation ==
Due to the difficulties of servicing a widely-spread membership, and following ACTU policy of the time, the ATAEA began seeking an amalgamation of unions representing the entertainment and media industry in Australia during the early 1990s. This decision, however, along with political and generational differences, caused division between the national office of the union and the Queensland branch. This animosity developed until the Queensland branch split away from the federal union in 1991, and later merged with the Australian Workers' Union in Queensland. The rest of the union merged with the Australian Journalists' Association and Actors' Equity in 1993 to form the Media, Entertainment and Arts Alliance (MEAA). The ATAEA continues to exist as a distinct section within the MEAA, and had 3045 members as of 2011.
