= Australian Journalists Association =

Australian trade union for journalists 1910–1992

The Australian Journalists Association (AJA) was an Australian trade union for journalists from 1910–1992.

In 1913 the Australian Journalists' Association merged with the Australian Writers' and Artists' Union. This union had been formed in 1910, launched on 9 September of that year in the Sydney Trades Hall by Harold Mercer (1882–1952), also known as Harold St Aubyn, a prolific writer who was involved in the creation of 28 new unions in total.

On 18 May 1992 it amalgamated with Actors' Equity and the Australian Theatrical and Amusement Employees' Association to create the Media, Entertainment and Arts Alliance. The AJA section is now known as MEAA Media.

== New AJA ==
In 2022 a new Australian Journalists Association appeared, which was not part of the MEAA. It forged a sponsorship arrangement with the Kennedy Foundation to provide A$50,000 to acquire naming rights to the Kennedy Awards, the richest media awards program in Australia. However this organisation was dubbed a "fake union", with ties to TNT Radio (an internet radio outlet whose focus is fringe topics and conspiracy theories, including anti-vaccination misinformation), which had also provided A$50,000 to the Kennedy Awards.

This new AJA had appropriated the name, but was in fact created by Journalists First Inc., a small group of conservative political operatives based in Queensland. It was one of a group of Red Unions (labelled "fake unions", as they were set up with political motives to divide the union movement, attracting members by their anti-vaccine mandate stance). It was not run by journalists and had no standing in industrial tribunals. In May 2022 the Kennedy Foundation cut its ties with this AJA, in a move welcomed by the MEAA.
