= Media, Entertainment and Arts Alliance =

Australian trade union

MEAA
- Media, Entertainment & Arts Alliance
- Founded: 1992; 34 years ago
- Headquarters: Redfern, New South Wales
- Location: Australia
- Members: ▼15,613 (as at 31 December 2024)
- Key people: Michael Balk, Federal President; Erin Madeley, Chief Executive; Adam Portelli, Deputy Chief Executive
- Affiliations: ACTU, FIA, IFJ, Unions NSW, Victorian Trades Hall Council, NSW Labor
- Website: www.meaa.org

The Media, Entertainment & Arts Alliance (MEAA) is the Australian trade union and professional organisation which covers the media, entertainment, sports and arts industries.

Its Musicians section consists of the SOMA (Symphony Orchestra Musician Association), TOMA (Theatre Orchestra Musicians Association), and, since December 2018, a new trade union for musicians, Musicians Australia (MA).

== History ==
The MEAA was created in 1992, registered on 18 May 1992, through the merging of the unions covering actors, journalists and entertainment industry employees:

- Actors Equity of Australia (AE)
- The Australian Journalists Association (AJA)
- The Australian Theatrical & Amusement Employees Association (ATAEA)

In 2006, the Symphony Orchestra Musicians Association (SOMA) joined, creating a fourth section.

The New South Wales Artworkers Union joined the MEAA, a Professional Sports Branch was created, and the Screen Technicians Association of Australia (STAA) reconstituted itself under the Alliance banner.

== Description ==
MEAA members include people working in TV, radio, theatre, the film industry, cinemas, entertainment venues and recreation grounds, including journalists, actors, dancers, sportspeople, cartoonists, photographers, orchestral and opera performers, as well as people working in public relations, advertising, publishing and website production.

The governing bodies of the MEAA are the Federal Council, the MEAA Board, National Section Committees and Branch councils.

MEAA is headed by Chief Executive Erin Madeley, who was appointed to the role in 2022. The Board comprises the federal president (as of 2021 Simon Collins) and 14 other members representing various industries and regions. Federal Council comprises representatives who are elected by MEAA members every two years.

=== Sections ===
The MEAA consists of four main sections:

- Media – Representing journalists and media staffers previously covered by the Australian Journalists Association
- Equity – Actors Equity, representing Australian professional performers, including screen actors, theatre practitioners and dancers
- ECS – (Entertainment Crew & Sport), including non-performance employees such as technicians, venue staff and ushers, and sport staff
- MEAA Musicians, including sub-sections:
  - SOMA (Symphony Orchestra Musician Association)
  - TOMA (Theatre Orchestra Musicians Association)
  - Musicians Australia

Musicians Australia (MA) was created in December 2018 as a union of non-employee musicians, focused on and acting only for musicians. Between then and June 2020, the Musicians section had grown by 518 members. MA's campaigns have focused on "calling out the exploitation of musicians and developing consensus around our core claim for minimum payments". Its "Love Live Music" campaign amplified the voices of musicians so that they could be heard by key decision-makers, as well as promoting their well-being of musicians and creating greater awareness of their economic value. An industry code of conduct is under development, to set fair rates for both venues and musicians.

=== Affiliations ===
In 2005 NZ Actors Equity (NZAE) affiliated to MEAA.

The MEAA is affiliated with the Australian Council of Trade Unions (ACTU), the International Federation of Actors and the International Federation of Journalists. It is a member of the Australian Copyright Council and is represented on all major training bodies catering for its members and State Labor Councils on behalf of its actors and other entertainment industry sections (excluding journalists) and in some states some sections are affiliated with the Australian Labor Party.

In 2011, MEAA ("the Alliance") approached the Association of Professional Engineers, Scientists and Managers Australia "to explore the benefits of collaboration by sharing back-end services or amalgamation".

The MEAA is also a member of the International Freedom of Expression Exchange, a global network of more than 70 non-governmental organisations that monitors press freedom and free expression violations worldwide.

== Awards ==
In 1992, the MEAA became trustee of the Walkley Awards, after the merger of the MEAA and the Australian Journalists' Association. In 2000, the Walkley Foundation for Journalism was created to manage the awards.

The Equity Foundation was established for performer members of the MEAA. It is "a professional development arm of MEAA Equity and Equity NZ". It runs professional development programs and, since 2011, a series of awards known as the Equity Awards. An Australian lifetime achievement award has been presented since 2009, and a New Zealand one since 2015.

== Activities ==
In January 2011, the Alliance gave a submission to Screen Australia regarding the revision of its television funding guidelines.

=== Industrial dispute in New Zealand ===
In September 2010, NZAE objected to contracts for actors in The Hobbit series planned for filming in New Zealand. MEAA notified the International Federation of Actors, which on 24 September 2010 issued a Do Not Work order for members worldwide. Producer Peter Jackson and minister Chris Finlayson claimed that New Zealand's Commerce Act 1986 made it illegal for the producers to engage in collective bargaining with NZAE on two grounds: first, that it represented independent contractors; and, second, that it was based outside New Zealand (being part of MEAA). The Screen Production and Development Association alleged that "MEAA/Equity has no legal status in New Zealand". The independent-contractor assertions were called into question by the 2005 court case Bryson v Three Foot Six Ltd. A. F. Tyson noted that critics "frequently focuse[d] on the MEAA rather than the NZAE"

On 20 October 2010, a Wellington meeting of NZAE was called off in the face of a protest planned by hundreds of film crew who feared The Hobbit production would relocate to Eastern Europe. On 26 October Simon Whipp of NZAE was quoted as saying that he would feel no guilt if it relocated. On 29 October the government rushed a bill amending the 1986 act through Parliament, overturning the 2005 decision by explicitly declaring all film workers to be independent contractors.

Emails released in December 2010 by way of the Official Information Act showed that Jackson told the Government he did not believe an international actors' boycott would force The Hobbit overseas. The message, sent to the office of Economic Development Minister Gerry Brownlee on 18 October, contrasts comments the film-maker made earlier in the month. A full list of the e-mails was released in February 2013 by the Ombudsman, at the request of Radio New Zealand and the New Zealand Council of Trade Unions, despite resistance on the grounds of commercial sensitivity from the New Zealand Government and Wingnut Films.

== See also ==
- List of trade unions
