= Finance Sector Union =

FSU
- Finance Sector Union
- Founded: July 1991
- Headquarters: Melbourne, Sydney, Adelaide, Brisbane, Perth
- Members: ▼20,658 (as at 31 December 2024)
- Key people: Julia Angrisano, National Secretary; Wendy Streets, National President; Jason Hall, National Assistant Secretary; Nicole McPherson, National Assistant Secretary
- Affiliations: ACTU
- Website: www.fsunion.org.au

The Finance Sector Union of Australia (FSU) is a white collar trade union that represents professionals working in the Banking, Finance, Insurance and Superannuation industries in Australia.

The FSU was formed from the amalgamation in 1991 of various smaller unions drawn from the banking, insurance, trustee, brokering, and general finance industries.

== History ==
The origins of the Finance Sector Union of Australia (FSU) extend back to 1919, when the Australian Bank Officers' Association (ABOA) was formed. The Australian Insurance Staffs' Federation (AISF) followed in 1920. An abortive attempt had been made to form an association of bank officers in 1913, but the bank clerk responsible for the move was discovered and summarily dismissed. However, ex-servicemen returning from the trenches of World War I were in no mood to be dealt with in the same way, and it was the self-belief which they had developed on the battlefields of France and the Middle East which gave them the confidence to form their own, independent staff association.

This did not necessarily mean that they had become radicalised as such, or that it was their intention to radicalise the finance sector. Indeed, both the ABOA and the AISF remained deeply conservative organisations for many years; terms such as association and federation were quite deliberately chosen to distinguish these organisations from their militant, blue-collar cousins.

It is necessary, however, to consider the organisational context in which the ABOA and AISF operated in the early decades of the 20th century. To begin, there were no female employees in either banking or insurance companies in Australia at this time. Recruits were drawn almost exclusively from rural and semi-rural areas, and especially from conservative middle-class families where the father was a lawyer, doctor, or member of some other respected profession. Employment in the finance sector at this time attached to itself a high degree of prestige; but the actual work – especially in the lower echelons – was tedious, repetitive, heavily supervised, and poorly paid. Moreover, an employee's cadetship (which could last for up to two years) was entirely unpaid, requiring that they be supported by their family; this helped justify the practice of drawing recruits from the middle classes. Employees were required to wear formal suits; were required to doff their hats and address their superiors as "sir"; were prohibited from marrying until such time as the bank believed they could financially support a family and thus not besmirch the bank's public standing; and were banned from attending public meetings, participating in political campaigns, or from seeking public office.

Also militating against their effectiveness was the fact that the ABOA and AISF were actually just two of a number of state-based staff associations which emerged in the finance sector during this period. These various organisations were not necessarily inclined to act co-operatively, or even to view one another as natural allies in the interests of their respective memberships. In some cases, it was not until the 1960s that the last of these state-based organisations agreed to merge with their federally based rivals. This division of membership naturally ensured that the overall coverage of the ABOA and AISF remained relatively small for many years; and those who did join frequently continued in the habits of difference and subservience into which they had been inculcated by the prevailing industry culture.

However, by the late 1950s, ABOA and the AISF were members of the Australian Council of Salaried and Professional Associations (ACSPA), an umbrella organisation that continuously co-operated with the Australian Council of Trade Unions (ACTU) on basic wages, and margins cases; and, in particular, ABOA's leadership sought close ties with the rest of the union movement.

=== Pre-WWII ===
Despite the many obstacles by which both the AISF and the ABOA were confronted, the very fact of their formation prompted the banks to raise employee salaries in 1919 and 1920. In 1921, insurance employers agreed to a log of claims submitted by the AISF, thus establishing the first ever national standard for employment conditions in that industry. These improvements, and the formation of the staff organisations themselves, were fiercely resented by banking and insurance employers, who accordingly adopted a number of aggressive tactics ranging from preferential treatment of non-unionists to outright intimidation to blunt the AISF's and the ABOA's effectiveness.

The Great Depression of 1930–39 was a period of extreme difficulty for both unions. The drastically declining national economy created an atmosphere of fear and apprehension, in which the thought of industrial action was abhorrent and the terror of unemployment conspired to produce a subservient workforce. In this environment, finance employers went on the offensive, cutting jobs and, in one instance, serving up a pay cut of 20% to insurance employees. Unsurprisingly, the unions' membership went into steep decline, plunging from 1281 in 1931 to 858 in 1937.

Despite these straitened circumstances, the AISF managed to win one important victory in 1931. In that year, the Arbitration Court allowed insurance employers to cut wages by a further 10%; on appeal to the High Court, the AISF successfully argued that this additional cut took wages below the ambit minimum that generated a 1927 pay claim and subsequent award. This ruling ensured that pay cuts could not continue to occur indefinitely.

Generally, speaking, however, the 1930s were a period when the extreme economic circumstances rendered both unions largely ineffective.

=== Post WWII ===
The aftermath of the Second World War, and in particular, the emerging economic power of women, presented new challenges for both unions. Manpower shortages during the war resulted in many women taking on jobs previously considered male-only preserves; at war's end, many women felt they should not have to surrender jobs which they had demonstrated they could perform as effectively as their male counterparts. The AISF and ABOA were confronted with the dilemma of accommodating the demand for employment by returning servicemen with the rising industrial voice of female employees. This dilemma was only partially resolved by the boom in insurance and banking after the war, which created a demand for staff that could only by partially supplied by the available male workforce. Moreover, many employers had re-classified as "female" many jobs previously labelled "male", and were happy to employ women in these roles – and pay them at significantly lower wages.

However, as early as 1927, the AISF Executive had supported a call for equality of wages, and in 1941, won an award establishing minimum female rates of pay. In 1942, a mass meeting of 600 female insurance employees called for the implementation of the equal pay principle; and in 1948, the AISF and other unions actively campaigned on this issue. However, this push was defeated by the post-war wage pegging legislation; it would not be re-implemented until the 1970s.

The ABOA spent the immediate post-war period engaged in a bitter controversy with the Chifley Labor government over its plans to nationalise the banking industry, and was instrumental in the election of the Menzies Liberal government in 1949. In the 1950s the ABOA embarked on three major industrial campaigns: the push for a 5-day working week; the introduction of long service leave; and the equalisation of wages between private banks and the Commonwealth Bank. These campaigns resulted in a growing industrial identity among bank employees; industrial action was seriously considered for the first time in the ABOA's history; and wage increases were won in 1951, 1954, and 1959. The right to a 5-day working week was finally achieved in 1963.

=== 1960s and 70s ===
The ABOA and AISF spent much of the first half of the 1960s consolidating their positions as the representative voice of banking and insurance employees, finally achieving merger with the various state-based staff associations (the AISF also changed its name to the Australian Insurance Employees' Union; the ABOA did not become the ABEU – Australian Bank Employees' Union – until some time later)). In the late 1960s, both unions once again took up the battle for equal pay for women. The employment of women had been resisted (and resented) by male employees right up to the outbreak of WWII, and often only grudgingly tolerated after that conflict because of the changed economic circumstances. By the late 1960s, however, women formed the majority of the workforce in both banking and insurance, and though under-represented in the decision-making organs of both unions, successfully pressed the case for an equal wages campaign.

The first step occurred when the ABOA instituted a policy of supporting women members who undertook claims for back pay for having performed "additional duties" – that is, work classified as "male". In 1969, the Arbitration Court handed down a decision setting out a timetable for the elimination of gender-based wage discrimination, and in 1970, the ABOA won compensation for four women who had not been paid the "male" wage rate when performing "male" classified work. In 1972, the AIEU and ABOA lodged claims for award variations, resulting in a decision that gender-based wage systems would be phased out by 1975. When employers threatened to drag the chain on implementing these reforms, the AIEU authorised strike action – the first time a white-collar clerical union in Australia had made such an authorisation. It was overwhelmingly supported by AIEU members.

As a consequence of these campaigns, in November 1975, the AIEU and ABOA finally achieved the elimination of gender-based wage systems.

The 1970s also saw the ABOA and AISF launch two more successful campaigns: firstly, for the implementation of four weeks' annual leave; and, secondly, the establishment of minimum entitlements for employees who lose their jobs through retrenchment due to organisational or technological change.

=== The 1980s and beyond ===
The deregulation of the Australian finance sector during the 1980s resulted in a highly volatile, fluid industry in which the old certainties were cast aside and the impact of neo-liberal economic policies became more apparent. One of the most noticeable changes was the emergence of "all-finance", the notion that banking and insurance companies break out of their traditional spheres of activity, and, through mergers, takeovers, and strategic alliances, look instead to offer their clients a suite of banking, insurance, stockbroking, and financial services products. The rapidly changing face of banking and insurance required a coherent response that was not to be anchored in a specific industry, but which instead could cover the entire field of finance and finance-related services.

In response to the changing face and direction of the finance industry in Australia, and after much negotiation, the Finance Sector Union of Australia was founded in July 1991 when the ABEU and the AIEU voted to amalgamate and create a union based on the industry itself, as opposed to the increasingly convoluted divide between the trades of insurance and finance. It followed that four smaller unions became involved in this merger: the AMP Society Staff Association, Trustee Companies Officers' Association; the Wool Brokers' Staff Association; and the Reserve Bank Officers' Association. In March 1994, the FSU was further consolidated when the Commonwealth Bank Officers' Association joined the consolidated union, while continuing to retain some functions as a separate section within the union.

During this period, the FSU also responded to the changing workplace environment by launching successful campaigns for the introduction of paid maternity leave (followed by paid parental leave, exclusive of gender), job sharing, and the introduction of employer sponsored sick leave cover for retrenched employees who find employment again in the industry within 12 months of their termination from their previous employer. However, the consequences of rapid technological change, the mass restructuring of workplaces and consequent off shoring of jobs, and the implementation of sweeping changes to Australian industrial law by the Howard Liberal government, means that many serious challenges face the FSU into the immediate and ongoing future.

On 1 October 2006, the Commonwealth Bank Officers' Section (CBOS) formally amalgamated with the FSU and ceased to be a separate entity within the FSU.

On 24 October 2022, the Fair Work Commission approved amendments to the rules of the FSU. The new rules removed sections and branches of the Union and provides for the FSU to operate as one national structure.

== Electorates of the Union ==
All members are attached to an employment and geographic electorate and may also be attached to occupational and/or special electorates if they identify with that electorate:

Employment Electorates	Geographic Electorates	Occupational Electorates	Special Electorates
ANZ Bank	Vic/Tas	Superannuation	LGBTQIA+
Bankwest	NSW/ACT	Credit Unions & Building Societies	First Nations
Commonwealth Bank	SA/NT	Centralised Customer Service	Disability
Insurance	Qld	Mortgage Brokers	Regional & Remote
Miscellaneous	WA	Technology Services	Young Adults
National Australia Bank		Wealth Management	
Other Banks			
Reserve Bank			
Westpac Banking Group			
