= Woolclassers' Association of Australia =

Trade union of Australian woolclassers

WAA
- Woolclassers' Association of Australia
- Merged into: Australian Workers Union
- Dissolved: 2009
- Headquarters: Culcairn, New South Wales
- Location: Australia
- Members: 1200 (1997)
- Key people: Chris Scholz, federal secretary
- Affiliations: ACTU
- Website: www.woolclassers.asn.au

The Woolclassers' Association of Australia (WAA) was a trade union representing woolclassers in Australia. It amalgamated with the Australian Workers Union (AWU) in 2009. It was affiliated with the Australian Council of Trade Unions (ACTU).
