= Communication Workers Union of Australia =

Australian trade union

Communication Workers Union (CWU)
- Communications, Electrical, Electronic, Energy, Information, Postal, Plumbing and Allied Services Union of Australia, Communications Division
- Communications Workers Union of Australia
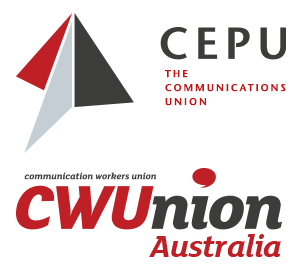
- Founded: 1912
- Headquarters: Milton, QLD
- Location: Australia
- National Divisional Secretary: Shane Murphy
- Parent organization: Communications, Electrical, Electronic, Energy, Information, Postal, Plumbing and Allied Services Union of Australia (CEPU)
- Affiliations: ACTU, Australian Labor Party
- Website: www.cwu.org.au – National Divisional Office www.cwucentral.org.au – Central Branch (NSW/ACT/QLD/SA/NT/WA) www.cwuvic.asn.au – VIC Branch

The Communication Workers Union of Australia is a trade union in Australia. It is a division of the Communications, Electrical and Plumbing Union of Australia.

It was formed in 1992 as a standalone Union following the merger of the Australian Postal and Telecommunications Union and the Australian Telecommunications Employees Association/Australian Telephone and Phonogram Officers Association.

At the time of the merger the union had a membership of approximately 85,000.

In 1993 it absorbed the Telecommunications Officers Association (TOA).

The CWU amalgamated with the ETU and PPTEU to form the CEPU in 1994, thereafter becoming a division of the larger union.

The three CEPU Divisions largely operate autonomously, as separate entities, on a day to day basis, other than in Tasmania, where an amalgamated Communications, Electrical and Plumbing Branch operates as a single State Branch.
