= Australian Postal and Telecommunications Union =

Australian trade union

APTU
- Australian Postal and Telecommunications Union
- Merged into: Communication Workers Union of Australia
- Founded: 1925
- Dissolved: 1992
- Headquarters: 37/39 Drummond Street, Carlton, Victoria
- Location: Australia
- Members: 47,000 (1979)
- Affiliations: ACTU, CAGEO, ALP, Postal, Telegraph and Telephone International

The Australian Postal and Telecommunications Union (APTU) was an Australian trade union which represented a wide range of employees in the postal and telecommunication industries, including postmen, postal and mail officers, delivery drivers, storemen, linesmen and telegram messengers. It was founded in 1925 and merged into the Communication Workers Union of Australia (CWU) in 1992.

== History ==
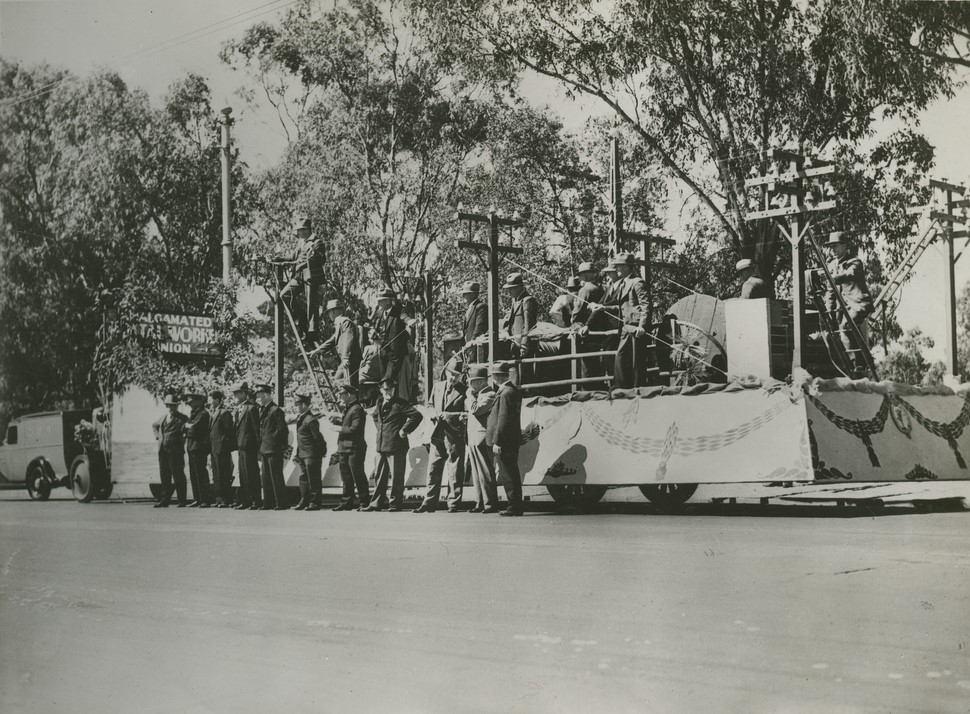
The Amalgamated Postal Workers Union float at the South Australian Labour Day parade, 1936.

The union was formed on 1 July 1925 as the Amalgamated Postal Linemen's, Sorters' and Letter Carriers' Union of Australia, through the amalgamation of the previously-independent Australian Postal Linesmen's Union, Australian Letter Carriers Association and Postal Sorters Union of Australia. The amalgamation process was opposed by the Victorian branch of the Letter Carriers' Association, as well as the Federated Public Service Assistants Association of Australia and the Australian Public Service Board. These groups launched an unsuccessful appeal against the amalgamation to the Commonwealth Arbitration Court.

In 1926 the union's name was simplified to the Amalgamated Postal Workers Union of Australia. The union's name was changed again in 1974 to the Australian Postal and Telecommunications Union. By 1987 the union's membership had grown to 48,800, of whom 53.1% were employed by Telecom. In 1990 the APTEU absorbed the Union of Postal Clerks and Telegraphists, followed by the Australian Postmasters Association in 1991 and the Postal Supervisory Officers Association in 1992.
