= Communications, Electrical and Plumbing Union =

Australian trade union

CEPU
- Communications, Electrical and Plumbing Union of Australia
- Headquarters: Rosebery, New South Wales
- Location: Australia
- Members: ▲110,877 (as at 31 December 2024)
- Key people: Michael Wright (National Secretary); Shane Murphy (National President); Earl Setches (National Assistant-Secretary)
- Affiliations: Australian Labor Party
- Website: www.cepu.asn.au

The Communications, Electrical and Plumbing Union of Australia (CEPU) is a trade union in Australia. Its full name is the Communications, Electrical, Electronic, Energy, Information, Postal, Plumbing and Allied Services Union of Australia as it represents workers in all of these industries.

== History ==
CEPU is an amalgamation of three separate unions, which are divisions of CEPU, namely the:

- Communication Workers Union of Australia (CWU);
- Electrical Trades Union of Australia (ETU); and
- Plumbing Trades Employees Union (PTEU).

Whilst the CEPU is technically one federally registered union, each of the above divisions act largely autonomously sharing resources when needed. At a state level many of the unions exist completely separately.

In February 2020 the CEPU was penalized by the Federal Court of Australia for breaches of the Fair Work (Registered Organisations) Act 2009 (Cth), after proceedings were commenced by the Registered Organisations Commission (ROC) in 2018. An appeal to this decision was lodged.

CEPU was affiliated with the Australian Council of Trade Unions. After the ACTU’s support for a federally administrated CFMEU the Union officially disaffiliated on 5 September 2024, following a vote.
