= National Union of Workers =

Former Australian trade union from 1989 to 2019

- National Union of Workers
- Merged into: United Workers Union
- Founded: 1989
- Dissolved: 2019
- Headquarters: Melbourne, Victoria
- Location: Australia
- Members: 66,247 (as at 30 June 2019)
- Key people: Tim Kennedy, National Secretary (2019)
- Affiliations: ACTU, IUF, ALP (excluding NSW branch)
- Website: www.nuw.org.au

The National Union of Workers was an Australian trade union from 1989 to 2019. The union covered workers in various industries and was one of the most powerful unions in the Australian Labor Party and its national Labor Right faction. In 2019, it merged with United Voice to form the United Workers Union.

== History ==
The National Union of Workers of Australia was formed by a progressive amalgamation of unions from 1989 onwards in a time when all Australian unions were merging, with varying degrees of success. These unions merged into the one larger union to pool their expertise and resources, so they could provide members with a larger range of quality services.

The six unions which form the National Union of Workers were established in the early part of last century and have been at the forefront of workers' achievements for nearly 100 years:

- Federated Storemen and Packers Union (Est. 1912)
- Federated Rubber and Allied Workers Union (Est. 1908)
- Federated Cold Storage and Meat Preserving Employees' Union (Est. 1908)
- Federated Millers and Manufacturing Grocers Union (Est. 1909)
- Commonwealth Foremen's Association (Est. 1912)
- United Sales Representatives and Commercial Travellers Guild (Est. 1888)

In 2018 it was announced the National Union of Workers was in the process of merging with another union, United Voice. In June 2019, the Fair Work Commission approved a vote on the proposed merger between the two unions which will be held in August. On 30 August 2019 the Australian Electoral Commission declared the result of the vote, with just over 95% of members supporting the amalgamation. The name of the new union was the United Workers Union. As a result of the amalgamation, the National Union of Workers will be deregistered as part of the merger and its members folded into the larger United Voice. On 11 November 2019, the new United Workers Union was formed.

== Coverage ==
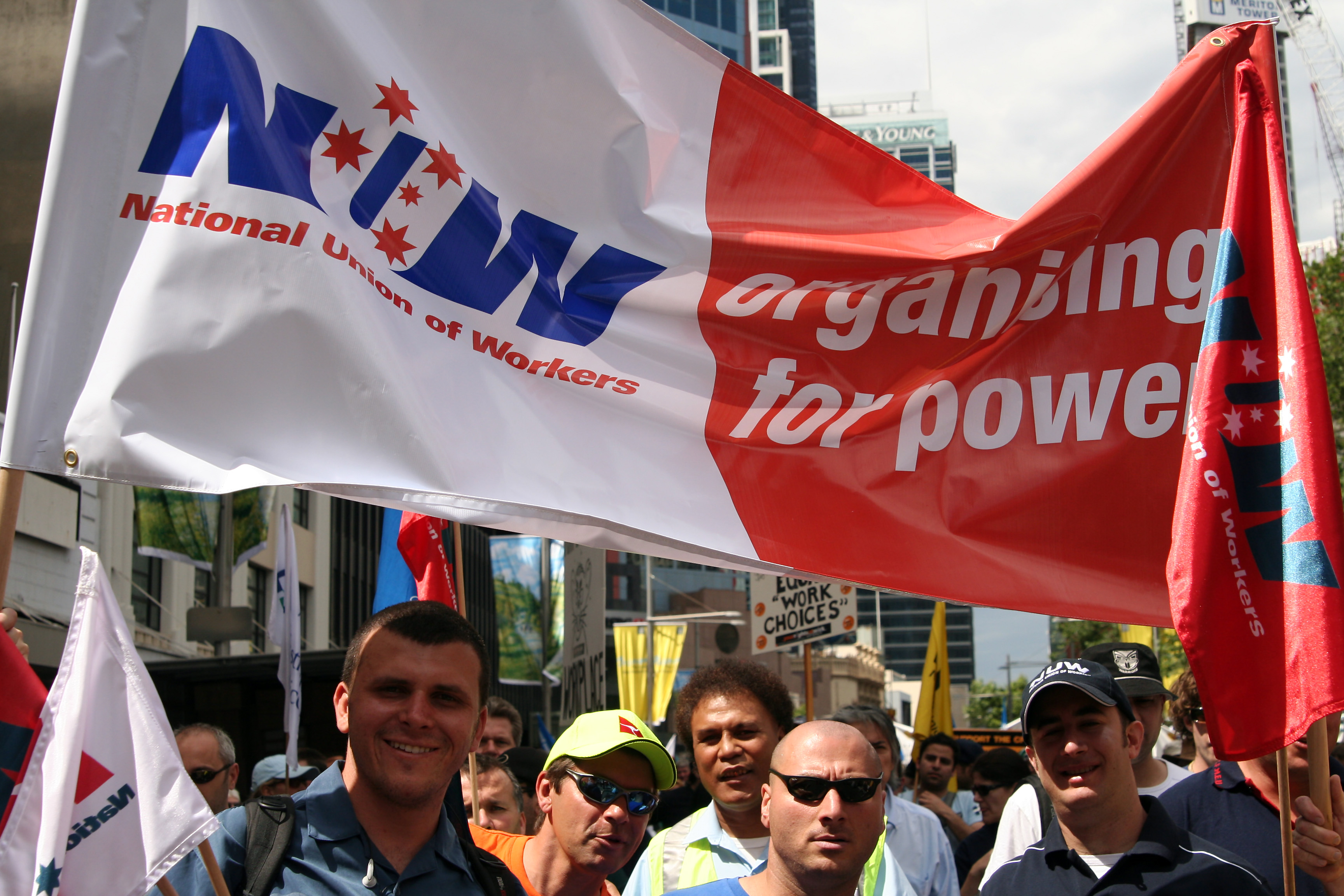
National Union of Workers workers protest Howard's industrial relations reforms in a 2005 rally in Sydney

The National Union of Workers covered workers in the following industries:

- Warehousing and distribution
- Food manufacturing
- Rubber, plastic and cable-making
- Dairy
- Cold storage
- Poultry, fish and game processing
- Skin and hide
- Wool
- Oil
- Pet food
- Pharmaceutical manufacturing
- Milling
- Market research
- Merchandising and sales representatives

== Politics ==
The National Union of Workers was one of the most powerful unions in the Australian Labor Party and its national Labor Right faction. It was generally a member along with other right-wing unions of the various state Labor Right factions that make up the national Labor Right faction. However it made up its own Labor Right faction in Victoria called Labor Action and in Queensland called Labor Unity (also known as the Old Guard). The National Union of Workers has also funded and supported the left-wing party, the Victorian Socialists.
