= Textile, Clothing and Footwear Union of Australia =

TCFUA
- Textile, Clothing and Footwear Union of Australia
- Merged into: Construction, Forestry, Maritime, Mining and Energy Union
- Founded: 1 July 1992
- Dissolved: 2018
- Headquarters: Sydney, New South Wales
- Location: Australia
- Key people: Tony Woolgar, national secretary
- Affiliations: ACTU
- Website: www.tcfua.org.au

Total employment in Australian textile, clothing and footwear manufacturing (thousands of people) since 1984

The Textile, Clothing and Footwear Union of Australia (TCFUA) was a trade union in Australia. It represented a wide range of workers from the textile, clothing, footwear and felt hatting industries.

The TCFUA was formed 1 July 1992 by the merger of the Amalgamated Footwear & Textile Workers' Union of Australia and the Clothing & Allied Trades Union of Australia. It was affiliated with the Australian Council of Trade Unions. In 2018, the TCFUA merged into the Construction, Forestry, Maritime, Mining and Energy Union.
