= Retail and Fast Food Workers Union =

Australian trade union

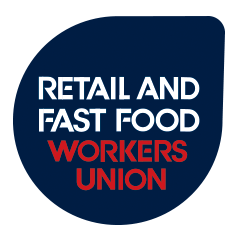
- Founded: November 2016; 10 years ago
- Headquarters: Melbourne, Victoria
- Location: Australia
- Members: 3,200 (April 2024)
- Key people: Loukas Kakogiannis, Secretary
- Website: raffwu.org.au

The Retail and Fast Food Workers Union Incorporated (RAFFWU) is an Australian registered industrial association for workers in the retail and fast food industries.

== History ==
The Retail and Fast Food Workers Union was established in December 2016, as a response to increased dissatisfaction with the existing Shop, Distributive and Allied Employees Association (SDA). Earlier that year, industrial researcher Josh Cullinan had found that "dozens of SDA-negotiated deals that industrial relations lawyers now suspect would have failed the “BOOT" or better off overall test if they’d been properly assessed by Fair Work".

The BOOT stipulates that an Enterprise Agreement must leave the workers it seeks to cover better off overall than the relevant industry award, which sets out the minimum standards for employment in said industry.

The Sydney Morning Herald reported at the time that "the amounts lost to workers are incalculable, they are certainly in the billions." Josh Cullinan became RAFFWU's inaugural Secretary.

In May 2020, the Victorian branch of the Construction, Forestry, Maritime, Mining and Energy Union (CFMEU) endorsed the union over the SDA. In 2022, RAFFWU delegate Stephen Bates became the first RAFFWU-affiliated politician, after being elected to the House of Representatives, as a member of the Australian Greens.

== Industrial approach ==
RAFFWU is highly critical of a number of aspects of the SDA which covers the same industries. Some of these practices include the negotiation of workplace agreements which reduced wages below Award rates, the former's lack of political independence, its socially conservative stances towards abortion and same-sex marriage, as well as its perceived "undemocratic" and "top-down" nature.

RAFFWU does not provide legal or other support for worker's compensation, unlike most other unions and the SDA.

== Legal status ==
Under the Fair Work Act, many powers are reserved for unions recognised as "Employee Organisations", which are "Registered Organisations" under the Registered Organisations Act.

RAFFWU is not a "Registered Organisation" like most Australian unions, due to "industry coverage restrictions" owing to its overlap with the established SDA and AWU. Instead, RAFFWU is incorporated as a not-for-profit Industrial Association This leaves it unable to access rights afforded to other unions.

RAFFWU officials are not able to hold Right of Entry permits, which grant the ability to, with notice, enter workplaces to speak to employees and investigate suspected contraventions of workplace laws. RAFFWU are also unable to initiate multi-employer bargaining, and its delegates lack the powers of union workplace delegates.

Notably, union delegates and officials from Registered Organisations, like the SDA, have the right to represent members and eligible workers in consultation about major workplace changes, rosters or hours of work changes, disciplinary processes, and resolving individual or collective complaints or disputes. Whereas RAFFWU members can only attend as support persons, who cannot speak or advocate on the worker's behalf.

RAFFWU is, however, able to be heard in dealings with the Fair Work Commission as bargaining representative in enterprise bargaining processes where appointed by affected employees, and as an organisation in Award Review proceedings.

== Industrial action ==
=== Coles Supermarkets ===
Following Josh Cullinan's success with the Hart decision, in which the Fair Work Commission rejected the 2014 EBA due to its failure to pass the BOOT.

With the 2014 agreement rejected, Coles employees were reverted to the 2011 agreement, but with an undertaking by Coles that the 2014 base rate of pay would not be decreased. RAFFWU then served Coles Supermarkets with a log of claims that would bring the agreement closer to BOOT compliance, including the return of penalty loadings during unsociable hours that were stripped in prior agreements.

Coles did not adopt the full suite of changes, arguing the new agreement was already BOOT compliant, and applied directly to the FWC for an employee ballot to approve the proposal to be held in February 2018, RAFFWU encouraged its members to vote against the agreement, raising concerns over concessions over lack of backpay and a grandfathering clause that only held a 55c premium over award rates for new employees whilst keeping older rates for existing employees. Which would allegedly create a two-tiered workforce.

On 26 February, the vote was successful with an approval rating of 90% despite only 48,000 or just 61% of the Coles workforce turning out to vote. The agreement included a $475 sign-on payment for full-time workers, pro-rated for part-time employees. RAFFWU continued to raise further concerns that the agreement included provisions for "standing consent" for part-time employees to work additional hours and to be paid at the ordinary rate rather than the applicable overtime rate. It also suggested that by incorporating the $1.50 laundry allowance into the hourly rate, that new employees would effectively only be receiving an additional 5¢ per hour on the minimum wage.

The agreement was approved in April 2018 following Coles providing undertakings covering concerns raised by the Fair Work Commission rather than any bargaining party.

In August 2018, The Age reported that Coles employees working unsociable hours received pay rises of up to 20% or between $100–$150 per week, due to the "scrapping of the cosy [SDA] union deal" that did not require Coles to pay the applicable penalty rates in the past.

=== Domino's Pizza ===
In August 2017, a Domino's Pizza delivery driver and RAFFWU member, applied to terminate the multiple expired enterprise agreements that covered those employed by Domino's Pizza within Australia. Under these agreements, delivery drivers weren't paid casual loading, penalty rates and received a driving allowance that was less than required under the Fast Food Award. In November 2017, the Fair Work Commission approved the termination of the enterprise agreement, resulting in Domino's employees being placed within the industry award within 12 weeks.

During that time, negotiations began between Domino's and the SDA for a new national enterprise agreement that was slated for a vote by employees in early January 2018. The vote was delayed by a week due to Domino's failing "to negotiate in good faith" with the RAFFWU in this process.

The new agreement passed overwhelmingly by employees through an electronic ballot, and the agreement was returned to the FWC for approval. RAFFWU raised concerns about the agreement as it traded "fixed start and finish times" for part-time employees for a two-cent pay rise. In March 2018, the enterprise agreement was abandoned and withdrawn by Domino's, who decided to continue to cover their employees under the industry Fast Food Award.

=== McDonald's ===
In late December 2018 and January 2019, RAFFWU began a major campaign in improving McDonald's workers conditions. The campaign revolved around the company's unlawful denial of employees' 10-minute breaks. Several McDonald's stores claimed that workers could either access drinking and toilet facilities at this time or take their allocated break. RAFFWU responded that this contravened the negotiated agreement and that workers had the right to drink water or go to the toilet whenever they wished.

Following threats by senior management of Tantex Holdings, the franchisee of 6 McDonald's stores across the Brisbane CBD, towards staff against sharing union posts on social media, RAFFWU organised a "historic" protest in front of the Myer Centre McDonald's in Brisbane, demanding the "basic human right" that is drinking water.

=== Other industrial action ===
In 2017, RAFFWU was involved in terminating expired enterprise and Workchoices era agreements covering Bakers Delight employees, elevating those affected to the modern award and restoring minimum rates of pay and other entitlements. In the same year, RAFFWU also terminated expired agreements at several IGA supermarkets.

In 2021, RAFFWU led workers at Sydney bookstore 'Better Read Than Dead' in protected industrial action in pursuit of an Enterprise Bargaining Agreement, and workers walked off the job in the first retail protected action in decades. After several days of action the campaign was successful and management agreed to an in-principle agreement.

In October 2022, Apple retail store workers who were members of RAFFWU held the first nationally coordinated strike action of Australian retail workers. In the same month, a majority of workers at Apple stores voted against a new Enterprise Bargaining Agreement put forward by Apple. On 23 December 2022, Apple retail workers who were members of RAFFWU took further industrial action in pursuit of a new Enterprise Bargaining Agreement, which marked the first time that retail workers in Australia had taken strike action during the Christmas retail trading period.

In 2023, RAFFWU members at Coles and Woolworths took protected industrial action in pursuit of a new Enterprise Bargaining Agreement for each workplace. This marked the first nationally-coordinated industrial action by supermarket workers in Australia.
