= Federated Storemen and Packers' Union of Australia =

Australian trade union for logistics and manufacturing workers (1912–1988)

S.P.U.
- Federated Storemen and Packers' Union of Australia
- Merged into: National Union of Storeworkers, Packers, Rubber and Allied Workers
- Founded: 1912; 114 years ago
- Dissolved: 1988; 38 years ago
- Headquarters: ACTU Building, 17/25 Lygon Street, Carlton, Victoria
- Location: Australia
- Members: 62,500 (1975)
- Affiliations: ACTU, ALP, International Federation of Food Unions, International Federation of Petroleum and Chemical Workers, Council of Australian Government Employee Organisations

The Federated Storemen and Packers Union of Australia was an Australian trade union that existed between 1912 and 1988. It represented workers employed in warehousing, transport logistics, and a limited range of manufacturing industries in Australia.

== History ==
The Storemen and Packers Union was formed in 1912. The union expanded rapidly after its creation, and became a prominent and influential member of the right-wing faction of the Australian labour movement. During the 1970s and 80s the Storemen and Packers were heavily involved in the establishment of the superannuation system through a direct action campaign. In 1988 the union amalgamated with the Federated Rubber and Allied Workers Union of Australia to form the National Union of Storeworkers, Packers, Rubber and Allied Workers. Several other small manufacturing and distribution unions soon joined the new body, and in 1991 it was renamed the National Union of Workers.

== Leadership ==
- Percy Clarey (General President, 1918–1960)
- Bill Landeryou
- Simon Crean
- Greg Sword
