= Clothing and Allied Trades Union of Australia =

Australian trade union

C.A.T.U.
- Clothing and Allied Trades Union of Australia
- Merged into: Textile, Clothing and Footwear Union of Australia
- Founded: 1907
- Dissolved: 1992
- Headquarters: Labor Council Bldg., Sussex Street, Sydney, NSW
- Location: Australia
- Members: 40,529 (1971)
- Affiliations: ACTU, ALP, International Textile, Garment and Leather Workers' Federation, Textile Workers' Asian Regional Organisation

The Clothing and Allied Trades Union of Australia (CATU) was an Australian trade union which existed between 1907 and 1992. The CATU represented workers employed in the manufacture of clothing and manchester goods, including pressers, cutters and machinists. Approximately 85 percent of the union's membership was female.

== Formation ==
The CATU was originally formed in 1907 as the Federated Clothing Trades of the Commonwealth of Australia. The union was created through the merger of a large number of small state- and craft-based trade unions which had been active in Australia since the mid-nineteenth century, including the Cutters and Trimmers Union of New South Wales and the Tailors' Trade Protection Society. These unions primarily represented skilled, male craftsmen in what was already a largely female industry. This created an ongoing tension within the CATU between the need to represent the whole of the workforce within the industry, and the greater level of organisation and distinction within some male-dominated trade occupations.

== Notable people include ==
Maria May Brodney was an active member of what was then called the Federated Clothing Trades' Union from 1915. She tried to organise clothing workers, particularly those involved in underclothing, on behalf of the union. She served on the union's executive and was active until 1929.

Anna Booth joined the union as a researcher in 1977 and in 1981 she played a role in establishing an afternoon break for Australian clothing workers. In 1987 she became the union's federal secretary. She was said to be Australia's youngest female federal secretary but she was not, as claimed, the first. The Australian Nursing and Midwifery Federation had female federal general secretarys including, for example, Barbara Carson in 1985. Booth left the union in 1995.

== Amalgamation ==
During the 1970s and 80s the removal of tariff protections for manufactured goods in Australia, automation of production processes, and an increase in the availability of cheap imports from Asia greatly reduced the size of the workforce in the Australian clothing industry. This, combined with a policy of union rationalisation pursued by the ACTU, put pressure on the CATU to effect a merger with other unions in the apparel industry. In 1992 the union merged with the Amalgamated Footwear and Textile Workers' Union of Australia to form the Textile, Clothing and Footwear Union of Australia.
