= Railway trade unions in Australia =

Railway Unions in Australia organised labour of railway employees in Australia operated under federal and State awards - this is a partial list of known unions. Many of the unions amalgamated over time, creating a complex trail of ancestry for some of the later unions.

== Federal Award unions ==
The following unions were based on federal - Australian wide awards

- Association of Railway Professional Officers of Australia (1921 - )
- Australian Federated Union of Locomotive Enginemen
- Australian Rail Tram & Bus Industry Union, RTBU (1993 - )
- Australian Railways Union, ARU (1921 - 1993)
- Australian Tramway and Motor Omnibus Employees' Association
- Australian Transport Officers' Federation
- Commonwealth Engine Drivers & Firemens Association of Australia (1918 - 1925)
- Commonwealth Railway Officers Association (1917 - 1950)
- Federated Tramways Officers Association (1920 - 1949)
- National Union of Rail Workers of Australia (1982 - 1993)

== New South Wales ==
- Australian Railways Union - N.S.W. Branch

== South Australia ==
- Australian Railways Union - South Australian Branch
- Australasian Society of Engineers - South Australia

== Tasmania ==
- Australian Railways Union - Tasmanian Branch

== Victoria ==
- Australian Federated Union of Locomotive Enginemen (Victorian Division)
- Australian Railways Union - Victoria
- Victorian Railways Transportation Employees Association (1906 - 1950)
- Train & Locomotive Drivers Association of Victoria (2017 - )

== Western Australia ==
Some of the following unions were the railway related unions in Western Australia.

- Association of Draughting, Supervisory and Technical Employees
- Amalgamated Society of Railway Employees (see below, Western Australian...)
- Australian Railways Union (Western Australian Branch)
- Railway Industry Council
- Rail Tram and Bus Industry Union
- Western Australian Amalgamated Society of Railway Employees' Union of Workers
- Western Australian Association of State Railway Employees
- Locomotive Engine Drivers’ Firemen's and Cleaners’ Union of Western Australia
  - (earlier known as West Australian Locomotive Engine Drivers' Firemen's and Cleaners' Union of Workers)
- West Australian Railway Officers’ Union
- Western Australian Railway Unions Joint Executive
- West Australian Vehicle Builders’ Industrial Union of Workers

== Records and archives ==
The Noel Butlin Archives Centre at Australian National University is one of the more significant repositories of railway union records in Australia
