= Australian Rail Tram and Bus Union (Victorian branch) =

Australian Rail Tram and Bus Union (RTBU) Victorian Branch
- Australian Rail Tram and Bus Union Victorian Branch
- Founded: 1 March 1998 (founded as Public Transport Union on 28 February 1993)
- Headquarters: ACTU building (Level 2), 365 Queen Street, Melbourne; Australia
- Location: Australia
- Members: 7772
- Key people: Vikrant Sharma (Branch Secretary); Phil Altieri (Assistant Branch Secretary)
- Affiliations: ACTU, ITF
- Website: www.rtbuvic.com.au

The Rail, Tram and Bus Union Victorian Branch or RTBU Victoria is the state branch of the RTBU in Victoria. Originally formed in 1993 as the Victorian branch of the Public Transport Union (an amalgamation of several smaller trade unions representing workers in public transport industries) and renamed the RTBU in 1998, the RTBU Victoria today represents nearly 8000 members across Rail Operations, Tramways, Locomotive, Infrastructure and Administrative areas of Victoria's public transport industry.

== Beginnings and original affiliates ==
The formation of Rail, Tram & Bus Union in 1998, formed as the Public Transport Union five years earlier, was the product of several older public transport unions amalgamating together in Victoria and nationally. Each of these unions had their own unique history and traditions prior to amalgamation.

=== Australian Railways Union ===
The Australian Railways Union (ARU) represented workers in railways and transport and was the largest of the public transport unions amalgamating into the PTU. Prior to unifying as a national union in 1921, the first rail workers’ union was the Victorian Railways Union (VRU) formed in 1911. The VRU was unique as the first ever industry-wide union formed in Australia for all workers in the railways including drivers, station staff, labourers and maintenance workers.

The Victorian ARU's headquarters from 1916 was the historical Unity Hall building on 636 Bourke Street, Melbourne. Unity Hall served as a meeting place both for the ARU and the Victorian union movement for much of the 20th century until it was sold in 1999 due to financial burdens suffered by the union in the Kennett era. The building remains a heritage-listed site.

The Victorian ARU was controlled by left-wing and militant forces in the labour movement virtually from its outset, coming under the control of unionists aligned with the Communist Party of Australia (CPA) in the 1930s, and remained so for much of its existence – the ARU's political alignments under the CPA were such that it disaffiliated from the Australian Labor Party in 1943 for what it perceived as the party's unsatisfactory policies on employment in the railways before re-affiliating in 1953.

=== National Union of Rail Workers ===
The National Union of Rail Workers of Australia (NURWA) also represented train drivers and rail workers. The union originally registered under the name National Union of Railwaymen (NUR) in March 1933 before being de-registered four months later. The NUR later revived itself in December 1938 and proceeded to merge with several smaller craft unions, including the Government Railways Transport Staff Association, the Department of Main Roads Employees’ Union and the Government Tramway Electrical Branch Workers’ Association. The NUR renamed itself the National Union of Rail Workers of Australia in 1982 and continued under this name until amalgamation in 1993. The NURWA was a relatively small union compared with the ARU with a national membership of a few hundred by 1993.

=== Australian Tramways & Motor Omnibus Employees’ Association ===
The Australian Tramways & Motor Omnibus Employees’ Association (AT&MOEA or ATMOEA) represented drivers and conductors in the tramways. The union was formed in 1910 as the Australian Tramways’ Employees Association before changing its title to ATMOEA in 1934. Like the ARU, the ATMOEA in Victoria was politically dominated by the CPA – when the party split in 1964 over allegiances to the Soviet Union or People's Republic of China, the ATMOEA's Victorian leadership became aligned with the pro-Beijing and Maoist Communist Party of Australia (Marxist-Leninist) or CPA-ML. The ATMOEA was briefly de-registered in 1950 but re-formed under the same name that year.

=== Federated Union of Locomotive Enginemen ===
The Australian Federated Union of Locomotive Enginemen (AFULE) represented locomotive drivers and crew in Australia from the 1920s. Locomotive enginemen originally organised alongside firemen as craft unions, with the first in Australia being the Victorian Locomotive Engine Drivers’ Association formed in 1861. The idea of a federated national body for enginemen was first proposed at a Victorian Conference of locomotive associations in 1886, which eventually occurred at the turn of the century with the formation of the Federated Locomotive Enginemen's Association of Australasia. This was renamed the Australian Federated Union of Locomotive Enginemen in 1920. The Victorian Locomotive Engine Drivers’ Association opted not to ballot its members on whether to amalgamate into the industry-wide VRU in 1911. The Association and later Victorian AFULE therefore remained a separate union from the ARU in Victoria for most of the 20th century. In 1993 the AFULE in Victoria and all other states and territories except Queensland voted to amalgamate into the PTU.

== History ==
=== Early 20th century ===
The development of rail lines in Victoria began around the middle of the 19th century, with the state government monopolising control of the railways in 1856. Significant expansion of railroads in the 1880s lead to a surge of those employed on the railway lines, including engine drivers, station masters and staff, clerks, labourers and gangers. These workers soon organised themselves into employees’ associations and craft unions (i.e. unions representing workers of a particular skill-set or grade, often within the same industry).

=== Victorian Railways Union ===
For most of the 19th century, the existence of separate craft unions for employees in the Victorian railways was the norm, with train drivers and crew, signalmen, shunters, station masters, staff and rail labourers all organised into different unions based on their grade of work. That owed a great deal to the hierarchical nature of employment on the railways, with differences being especially pronounced between locomotive drivers, station staff and clerks, and "unskilled" workers. That invariably led to different scales of pay and complex bargaining for different groups of workers, and convinced many of the need for an industry-wide union. The first attempt at a united union occurred in 1884, when rail labourers formed an all-grades Mutual Services Association. Labourers were the lowest-paid workers in the railways and hence the most committed to the benefits of an industry-wide union, but entrenched divisions between grades of workers made most other rail employees hesitant to join. The Association renamed itself the Amalgamated Society of Railway Employees (ASRE) in 1900.

With the onset of the 1890s Depression, and its effects upon their wages and security of work, the attitude of rail employees towards an industry-wide union began to shift. In 1903, the government of conservative Premier William Irvine sought to stifle the electoral threat of rail workers’ anger at pay cuts by passing of the Separate Representation Act. The Act barred railway employees from voting in their own electorates, instead being allotted two separate seats in State Parliament's lower house. The ensuing campaign to repeal the Act galvanised rail workers’ commitment to unionism and bolstered the ASRE's ranks. In July 1911, after a ballot of members on the question of an industry-wide union which resulted in a strongly affirmative opinion, the ASRE and all other craft unions in the railways, with the exception of the locomotive drivers' association, combined to form the Victorian Railways Union (VRU). The VRU supported the foundation of the Victorian Labour College in 1917, providing rooms for them to use. The VRU later became the Victorian branch of the Australian Railways Union (ARU) when railways unions from each state and territory unified nationally in 1921.

The VRU's first Secretary was Frank Hyett, an ardent socialist who, despite lacking a personal background in the railways, quickly established himself as an able and dedicated organiser for the union, proving highly effective in uniting the different associations and craft unions into the VRU. The Gazette, which was the newspaper of the VRU, and later the Victorian branch of the ARU, for nearly a century, carried the motto “Work and vote for Socialism”.

The Victorian branch of the ARU was also notable for being one of the few left-wing unions in Australia to have been both captured and subsequently lost by anti-communist elements in the years leading up to the Australian Labor Party split of 1955. A Catholic-dominated and anti-communist Industrial Group ticket, led by shunter Jim Neill, mounted a successful campaign to oust the incumbent Communist Party of Australia (CPA) leadership at branch elections in the early 1950s, with Neill supplanting J.J. Brown as State Secretary in 1954. However, Brown and the CPA militants succeeded in reclaiming the Victorian branch from the Groupers by 1955, after which the Victorian ARU remained firmly under left-wing control.

=== Clarrie O’Shea and 1969 General Strike ===
One of the greatest episodes of industrial unrest in the post-World War II history of Australia's union movement took place in 1969 following the arrest and jailing of ATMOEA Victorian Secretary, Clarrie O’Shea for refusal to pay penal fines incurred for striking.

O’Shea, a Maoist aligned with the CPA (M-L), had pursued a campaign of consistent industrial militancy since being elected ATMOEA State Secretary in 1947 to defend and advance his members’ wages and conditions, sick leave and benefits. The strikes and work stoppages this entailed incurred heavy penal fines on the ATMOEA under the penal section of the Conciliation and Arbitration Act – this legislation had been introduced by the Commonwealth Government in 1951 in an effort to deter industrial action on the part of unions. Bans clauses introduced by the Conciliation and Arbitration Commission also existed at this time to deter strike action.

By 1969 the Victorian ATMOEA had accrued more than $13000 in fines under the Act for striking and was ordered by the Commonwealth Industrial Court to pay over $8000 up front. Rather than pay the fines however O’Shea refused to obey the Court's orders and repeatedly refused to accept its summonses. O’Shea finally appeared at the Industrial Court in Melbourne on 15 May – on the day of his appearance over 5000 unionists marched to the Court in a rally organised by a committee of 27 “rebel” left-wing unions in Victoria sympathetic to O’Shea. After again refusing to pay the strike fines and turn over the ATMOEA's financial records to the Court, O’Shea was jailed by the presiding Judge, future Governor-General John Kerr, for contempt of court.

News of Clarrie O’Shea's jailing triggered an immediate reaction among workers and unionists, with tens of thousands of workers walking off the job in Melbourne and every city in Australia – this action quickly snowballed into a six-day-long nationwide general strike, the first in Australia since World War II. Huge marches took place in every Australian city demanding O’Shea's release and the abolition of the Commonwealth anti-strike clauses, with cities including Melbourne and Hobart being virtually ground to a halt. Sentiment against the penal powers was very strong in the union movement by this time, with unions across Australia owing more than $300000 in strike fines at the time of O’Shea's jailing. On the sixth day of the general strike, Clarrie O’Shea was finally released after the ATMOEA's outstanding fines were paid on behalf of an "anonymous benefactor" alleged to have won the NSW lottery, widely believed to have been acting on behalf of the federal government. Upon his release, O’Shea said, "My release is a great victory for workers...The infinite power of the workers when they are really aroused has frightened the life out of the government and the employers..."

The outcome of the general strike was a huge victory both for the ATMOEA and the Australian union movement – while bans clauses remain on the books of Commonwealth legislation, most of the anti-strike penal clauses were abolished in the ensuing years and as a consequence of the strike have never been invoked by the Commonwealth Government in any industrial dispute since.

=== 1990 Melbourne tram dispute and lock-out ===
In 1989 the Victorian Cain Labor Government announced that it would seek to abolish all tram conductors as a cost-cutting measure as part of its effort to arrest the state's fiscal crisis. This was a huge blow for the Victorian ATMOEA, for whom tram conductors had been the backbone of the union and an iconic feature of Melbourne.

After several months of ongoing campaigning against the planned abolitions, on 1 January tram drivers and conductors took control of their trams and began to operate them for free as a “work-in” in protest against the State Government's plans. The State Government responded by cutting power to Melbourne's tram grid, leaving hundreds of trams grounded in the city's CBD between Elizabeth and Bourke Street. At the same time tramways workers occupied and took control of tram depots at Essendon, Brunswick and South Melbourne as part of their effort to demand that Premier John Cain and Transport Minister Jim Kennan to reverse their plans to abolish conductors. The dispute ultimately turned into a month-long lock-out – although Melbourne's tramways were left paralysed for the duration of the dispute, the abolition of conductors ultimately went ahead. Despite this the ATMOEA did win some concessions as a result of the dispute, with tram conductors being phased out gradually over an 8-year period and many being retrained as ticket inspectors.

=== Kennett era and privatisation ===
Victoria's public transport unions suffered significant losses in size and industrial clout under the State Liberal Government of Jeff Kennett from 1992 to 1999. Following his election as Premier Kennett pursued a strongly neo-liberal program of cost-cutting and privatisation of services purportedly to revive Victoria's flagging economy – this took the form of drastically cutting back and de-regulating Victoria's public transport sector, with the sacking of 16,000 public transport workers, the closure and scaling back of several train lines and the eventual privatisation of Victoria's public transport system in 1999 all taking place.

Despite industrial action and stopworks the impact of these changes on Victorian transport unions was huge – redundancies bought the Victorian ARU's workforce density down to 1 percent at one stage, while the phasing out of Melbourne tram conductors by 1998 caused the ATMOEA to also shrink sizeably. These cutbacks in Victoria and throughout Australia were key to these unions’ decision to amalgamate.

It was also during the 1990s that control of the Victorian ARU began to change hands from the old CPA-aligned leadership to a new group of union activists based around the Rank-and-File Committee ticket. The Victorian ATMOEA experienced parallel changes, with control of the state branch swinging from its old guard Maoist leadership to a moderate-leaning ticket around this time.

=== Amalgamation ===
In 1993, Australia's public transport unions resolved that the impact of changes in the public transport industry was such that it would be to their members’ benefit to amalgamate into a single union. The national and state branches of the ARU, ATMOEA, AFULE and NURWA consequently balloted their members on the question as to whether they favoured amalgamation, in which over 85% of their combined members voted ‘Yes’. As a result, these unions amalgamated into a single Public Transport Union (PTU) in February 1993.

The first State Secretary of the Victorian branch of the PTU was former ARU Branch Secretary Peter Bourke. The need for unity within the newly formed PTU in Victoria was paramount, with each amalgamating union bringing with it a strong desire to maintain autonomy from one-another that might have been an obstacle to unity. Despite these challenges the State Branch's leadership proved successful in making the PTU into a coherent union representing the interests of its members in all areas of public transport.

The PTU and its amalgamated divisions continued to suffer declining membership throughout the 1990s due to job losses in public transport in all states and territories. Despite the downturn of this period the PTU in Victoria was still able to accomplish significant industrial action, most notably a 48-hour strike during the 1997 Grand Prix weekend in protest at State Government plans to dissolve the Public Transport Corporation.

=== Renamed RTBU ===
In March 1998 the PTU chose to rename itself the Australian Rail Tram and Bus Industry Union (RTBU) to reflect the privatisation of numerous public transport services in Australia. Since the 2000s the RTBU in Victoria has been able to gradually rebuild its membership from the Kennett years. As State Secretary Trevor Dobbyn said in 2002, "We have outlived (Kennett)...in fact, we have got bigger and stronger."

In October 2012 the union took protected industrial action in Melbourne involving work stoppages in rail operations as part of a campaign by Metro workers against planned changes to their rosters and pay. In February 2014 Luba Grigorovitch took office as State Secretary of the RTBU's Victorian Branch following the retirement of Trevor Dobbyn. Grigorovitch is the youngest and first female State Secretary of the Victorian RTBU in the union's history.

=== 2015 dispute ===
In 2015, the RTBU Victoria engaged in industrial action in pursuit of enterprise agreements with the two main operators in Victoria, Metro Trains and Yarra Trams.

The Union alleged it was offered a sub-standard deal for members in enterprise agreement bargaining by both companies, and although the Labor Party was in office the Union was left with no choice but to lodge for protected industrial action on behalf of members.

The city came to a standstill as members marched and rallied for a fair deal. This was the first time in 18 years that there was a stoppage on both trains and trams in Melbourne.

After 6 weeks of industrial action, a new deal was reached between the Union and public transport providers which was welcomed by members overwhelmingly by a 98% yes vote.

== Coverage ==
The RTBU Victorian Branch covers all workers in the rail and tram industry.

Due to the privatisation of public and chartered buses in Victoria and demarcation agreements with other unions, the RTBU does not cover workers in bus services in Victoria.

== Structure ==
=== Divisions ===
The day-to-day operations of the union are broken down into divisions that reflect its members’ different areas of work:

• Rail Operations • Tram & Bus • Locomotive • Administration, Supervisory, Technical & Professional • Infrastructure • Fleet Manufacture, Overhaul, Maintenance & Service (Workshops)

Each division has its own delegates elected from each worksite who form divisional committees and sub-committees.

=== Branch Executive and Council ===
The administration and control of the RTBU's Victorian branch is invested in its Branch Executive. The Branch Executive consists of the Branch's president and vice-president, Secretary and Assistant Secretary, Divisional presidents and Secretaries and Organisers. The Executive effectively functions as a committee of management for the State Branch.

The highest deliberative body in the state structure of the Victorian RTBU is its Branch Council. This consists of members of its Executive in addition to divisional and regional organisers and divisional and regional delegates elected to Branch Council. The Branch Council is tasked with governance of the State Branch in Victoria, including determining its rules, structures and relations with the national union. Branch elections for the union's various positions, including State Secretary and other Executive positions, organisers, committee members and delegates are held once every four years as per the RTBU Victoria's constitution.

== List of Branch presidents & Secretaries ==
=== Branch presidents ===
1998–1999	Michael Kavanagh
1999–2006	Marc Marotta
2006–2011	Brian Head
2011–2014	Terry Sheedy
2014–present	Darren Lamont

=== Branch Secretaries ===
1998–2000	Peter Bourke
2000–2014	Trevor Dobbyn
2014–2022	Luba Grigorovitch
2022–Present	Vikrant Sharma

== See also ==
- Australian Rail Tram and Bus Industry Union
