= National Union of Rail Workers of Australia =

The National Union of Rail Workers of Australia (originally National Union of Railwaymen of Australia) (NUR) was an Australian trade union representing railway industry workers which operated from 1938 until 1993.

== Origins ==
The union had its roots in dissident New South Wales railway workers who had refused to join the 1917 general strike. The dissident workers had formed two unions in the wake of the strike: the New South Wales Government Railways Permanent Way Association and the Association of Employees (Mechanical Branch) of the New South Wales Railways. A subsequent Labor state government had allowed the deregistered Australian Railways Union to be reregistered at state level and had stripped the dissident unions of their registration. A later Nationalist Party of Australia government had reregistered the dissident unions, which had then been revoked again by Labor under Jack Lang.

The two dissident unions amalgamated to form the Railway Service Association on 6 June 1930. The association then formed a new union, the National Union of Railwaymen in October 1932, with the intention of seeking federal registration as a union. Walter Skelton, a former New South Wales state MP, served as union secretary. The union and its predecessors were often referred as the "loyalist" union, which the union secretary stated that was because they had refused to "associate with strike-mad theorists" or "adhere to any political party"; many sources noted that they were frequently known as the "scab" union. Its constitution covered all railway workers at all levels, giving it the coverage of "one big union" covering railway workers throughout the Commonwealth if workers so chose.

== 1933 registration attempt ==
The union's first attempt at registration in late 1932 was withdrawn due to "technical irregularities". A second attempt at registration, in January 1933, met with strong opposition from the unions, with many unions – variously reported as being between 17 and 23 – opposing the application before the Commonwealth Arbitration Court, including the Australian Railways Union, the Federation of Salaried Officers of Railway Commissioners, the Australian Tramway and Motor Omnibus Employees' Association, and the Australian Workers' Union. The opposing unions dismissed the union as not being "bona fide" on the basis that only 206 members of the 5,000 in the Railway Service Association and of the 90,000 workers in the industry had joined the new union, while claiming that the union rules made the executive "a junta able to exercise despotic power". Other unions opposed "new organisations coming in to divide workers already properly catered for".

The case highlighted the strong ongoing antipathy between the Australian Railways Union and the dissident unions seeking to form the NUR. Several NUR members gave evidence that they had refused to join the ARU because they saw it as affiliated with Russia and inconsistent with Catholic beliefs. NUR officials had campaigned against the NSW Labor government of Jack Lang at the 1932 election, citing Lang's previous attempts to deregister them and their belief that some of Lang's legislation "bordered on Sovietism"; in return, they claimed during the case that feared that they would lose their jobs if Lang returned to government in the future. They were at times met with a strong response from the existing unions: NSW state MP Abe Landa publicly labelled the NUR a "corrupt organisation" which existed to "satisfy the personal ambitions of certain NUR officials" and described their witnesses as "weak, twisting and vacillating", while alleging that the NUR had violated its own rules.

On 30 March 1933, the Industrial Court granted their application for registration, finding that because of their history they had the same rights as the Australian Railways Union and that they had shown that their members could not "conveniently belong" to the ARU. All the opposing unions immediately resolved to co-operate in an appeal to the full bench of the Industrial Court, which was lodged in early April. The NUR then moved to absorb the membership of the Railway Service Association and to wind down that organisation. In media coverage following the decision, Skelton highlighted the union's detailed constitutional provisions against political activity, while Fletcher proudly stated that they had never resorted to strike action. The NUR's 1933 conference, while expressing gratitude for the defeat of the Lang government, was sharply critical of the conservative Stevens NSW government for reintroducing the 48-hour week and opposing wage increases. In hearings on the appeal, the NUR claimed to have actually had 5000 members, while the Australian Workers' Union claimed that it was "a phantom body without funds". On 13 July 1933, the full bench upheld the appeal against registration "with regret" on a technicality, as the NUR had "not accompanied [their application] with a list of branches of the National Union with appurtenant particulars." The Chief Judge, while allowing the appeal, noted the "bitter and continuous hostility" between the unions and stated that if they "became members of the [ARU] they would fail to obtain a fair proportional share of control or influence in the activities of that union."

The NUR continued its advocacy at the NSW state level after its failure to gain federal registration, campaigning for a 44-hour week, opposing legal action to defend railway staff blamed for an accident, opposing reduction of fares and freight dues on the basis that funds should be directed towards increasing wages instead, and opposing various wage reductions. In September 1933, Skelton announced that the union would set up a "Reduction of Taxation League", advocating for a drastic reduction in taxation on a cross-party basis. In October 1933, the NUR succeeded in a Conciliation Court application that around 200 NUR and non-union workers receive the same wages and conditions as union workers covered by a federal award. In February 1935, the union succeeded in negotiating a 44-hour week for their members. In March 1935, the union was successful in bringing their entire membership of NSW railway employees within the federal award and basic wage. The union had launched its own publication, the "Railway Advocate", by the late 1930s.

== 1938 registration ==
In March 1938, the NUR made a third and ultimately successful bid for federal registration as a union. In April 1938, it merged with another small union, the Government Railways Transport Staff Association. The union was finally federally registered in December 1938. The ARU appealed against the decision, but the Industrial Registrar upheld the registration in May 1939.

By 1940, it was reported that the NUR had commenced organising in South Australia, Victoria and Tasmania, and a Tasmanian branch was inaugurated by dissident former ARU members that August. After strong opposition to the NUR from the Launceston Trades Hall Council, the Tasmanian state Labor government quickly confirmed that they would not recognise the NUR in that state. Nonetheless, the new state branch elected their first state executive in September 1940; by that time, the branch was reported to have 167 registered members and to be "well established". It was reported in October 1940 that the ARU-NUR conflict at the Launceston rail yards had reached the stage where some workers were refusing to complete work begun by members of the opposite union.

The union changed its name from the National Union of Railwaymen to the National Union of Rail Workers in 1982.

== Amalgamation ==
In 1993 the NUR amalgamated with the Australian Federated Union of Locomotive Enginemen (AFULE), Australian Tramway and Motor Omnibus Employees' Association (ATMOEA) and Australian Railways Union (ARU) to form the Australian Rail, Tram and Bus Industry Union (ARTBIU), also known as the Public Transport Union (PTU).
