= Railway Union (disambiguation) =

Railway Union is a trade union for railway staff in Finland.

Railway Union may also refer to:

- Railway trade unions in Australia
- Railway Union Sports Club, a multi-sports club in Dublin, Ireland

== See also ==
- List of trade unions
