= High Capacity Metro Train =

Rolling stock in use on the Melbourne rail network

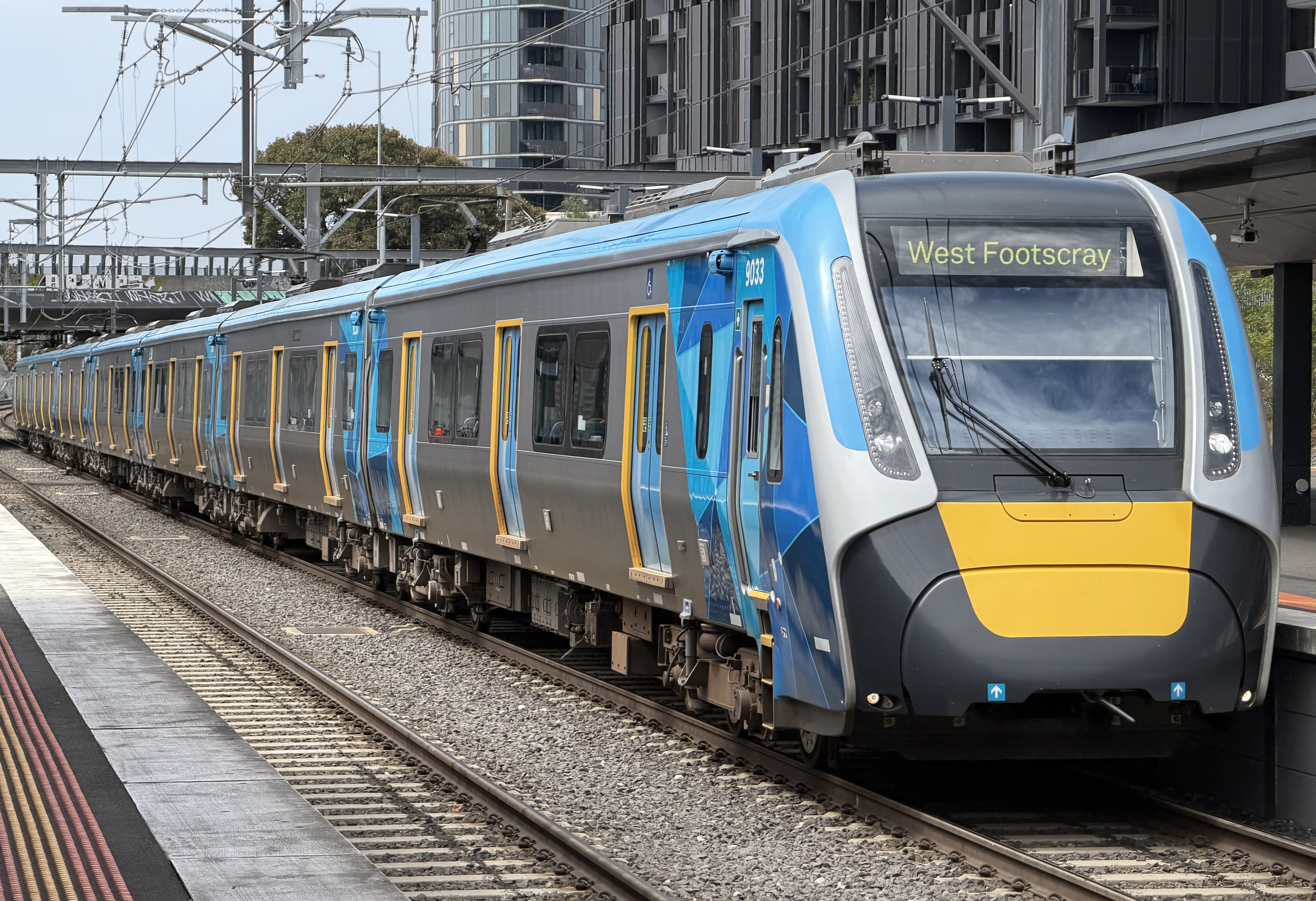
- HCMT set 33 at Footscray station, January 2026

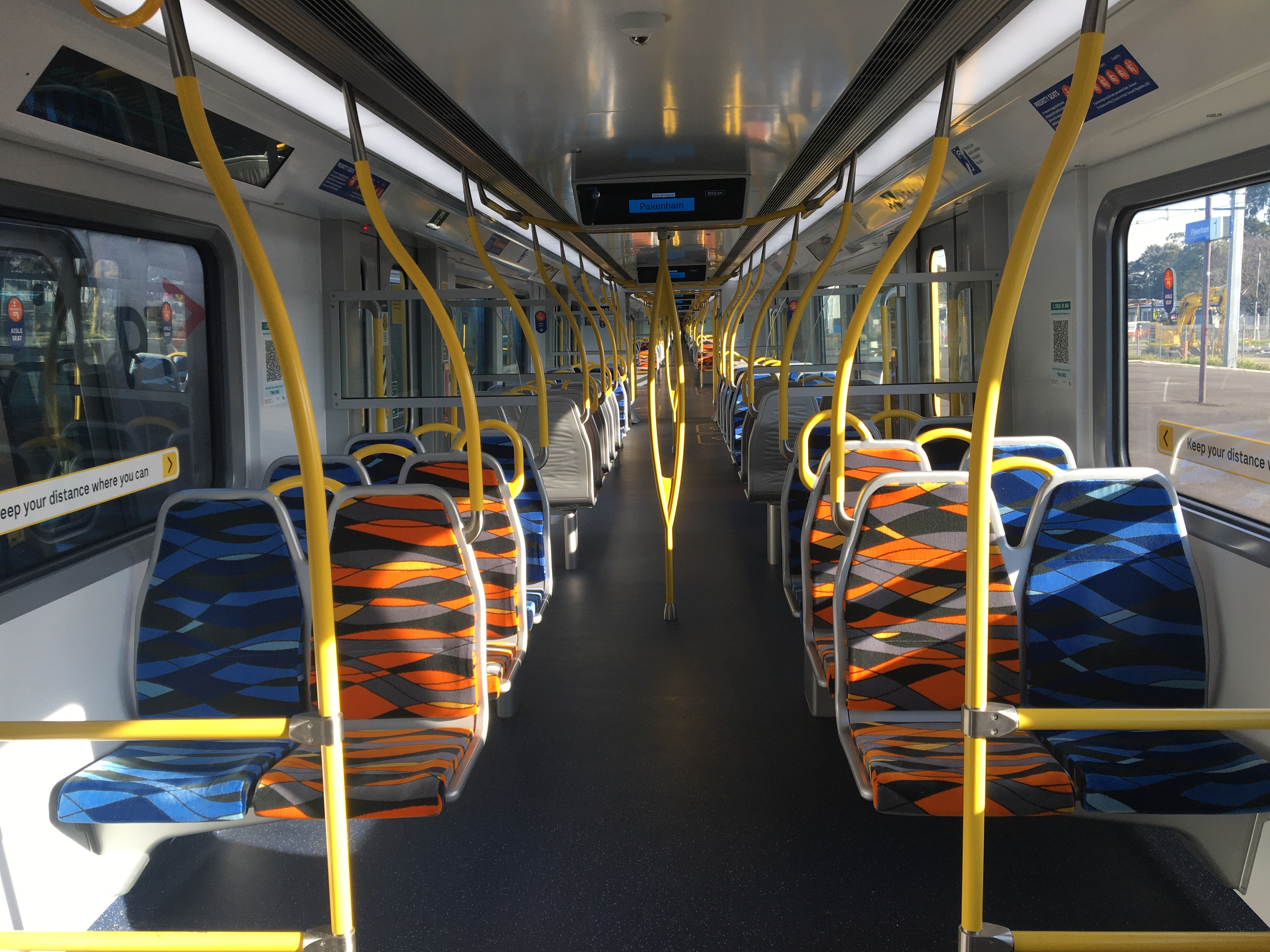
- Interior of HCMT in service, showing PIDs and seating
- Stock type: Electric multiple unit
- In service: 2020–present
- Manufacturers: Evolution Rail (Downer Rail, CRRC Changchun and Plenary Group)
- Assembly: Newport Workshops, Newport, Victoria, Australia
- Built at: Changchun, China (Bodyshells and Bogies)
- Constructed: 2018–2024
- Entered service: 27 December 2020
- Number built: 490 carriages (70 sets)
- Number in service: 490 carriages (70 sets)
- Formation: 7-car sets Tc–DMp–Mp1–DT–Mp2–DMp–Tc
- Fleet numbers: 01–70
- Capacity: 1,380 (gross train capacity); 1,800 (crush)
- Operator: Metro Trains Melbourne
- Depots: Pakenham East; Calder Park; Westall
- Lines served: Pakenham Cranbourne; Sunbury; Melbourne Airport (planned); Melton (proposed)

Specifications
- Train length: 160,196 mm (525 ft 6 15/16 in)
- Car length: 24,648 mm (80 ft 10 3/8 in) (Tc); 22.18 m (72 ft 9 1/4 in) (DMp/Mp/DT)
- Width: 3.04 m (9 ft 11 11/16 in)
- Height: 4,186 mm (13 ft 8 13/16 in)
- Floor height: 1.17 m (3 ft 10 in)
- Entry: Level
- Doors: 6 per carriage, 3 per side
- Maximum speed: 130 km/h (81 mph)
- Weight: 316.9 t (311.9 long tons; 349.3 short tons)
- Axle load: 1 sanded axle (DMp); 2 sanded axles (Mp)
- Traction system: Times Electric t Power-TN24 IGBT–VVVF
- Traction motors: ABB asynchronous 3-phase AC
- Electric systems: 1,500 V DC (nominal) from overhead catenary
- Current collection: Pantograph
- Safety system: West Footscray to Clayton only: Bombardier CITYFLO 650 CBTC (referred to as "High Capacity Signalling" by the Victorian Government)
- Coupling system: Dellner
- Seating: 502
- Track gauge: 1,600 mm (5 ft 3 in) broad gauge

The High Capacity Metro Train (HCMT) is a type of electric multiple unit (EMU) train for use by Metro Trains Melbourne on the Melbourne rail network. The first train set entered service on 27 December 2020 and is the exclusive rolling stock used in the Metro Tunnel for passenger services.

The HCMTs carry around 1,400 passengers in seven carriages, running on Melbourne's 1,500 V DC overhead catenary system, and are currently the most advanced trains in Metro Trains's fleet. Under a public-private partnership with the Victorian Government, the Evolution Rail consortium – comprising Downer Rail, CRRC Changchun and Plenary Group – delivered a fleet of 70 High Capacity Metro Trains between 2018 and 2024. The train bodies were manufactured in China with final assembly and fitting-out occurred at Newport Workshops in Victoria.

The HCMT fleet services the entirety of the Cranbourne, Pakenham and Sunbury lines through the Metro Tunnel.

== History ==
=== Background ===
The previous major procurement of rolling stock for the Melbourne rail network occurred in 2002, when franchisees M>Train and Connex ordered 62 Siemens Nexas and 58 X'Trapolis 100 trains respectively, as part of their franchise agreements to replace the older Hitachi trains. However, the Siemens units suffered major braking issues over the following decade, causing their repeated withdrawal from service. Furthermore, when the State Government tendered for 18 further six-carriage trains in 2007, it restricted bids to the previous two models ordered and awarded the contract to Alstom. Several further orders were placed for X'Trapolis trains over the next 10 years.

The Public Transport Development Authority (later branded as Public Transport Victoria) was created in 2011 by the newly elected state government of Premier Ted Baillieu with the intent of, among other things, running major studies into the operation of the metropolitan rail network. The Network Development Plan – Metropolitan Rail (NDPMR), released publicly in early 2013 in the partial fulfillment of this objective, was designed as a series of concrete proposals for the expansion and consolidation of the rail network over the following 20 years. The NDPMR's first stage, intended to be completed before 2016, acknowledged the need for an interim solution of several more X'Trapolis trains to overcome major constraints, as well as recommending the internal reconfiguration of Siemens and Comeng trains to increase capacity, but identified the provision of new rolling stock as critical to the cost-effective use of existing railway infrastructure.

Among the deficiencies of existing rolling stock noted by the NDPMR were "multi-purpose" designs intended to strike a balance between commuter rail and metro operations, and the failure of existing trains to use the entire length of metropolitan platforms. The NDPMR rejected double-decker trains on the basis that they would increase dwell time at crowded stations, and argued that 220-metre (721 ft 9 in) trains, formed by operating the existing three car sets as nine car trains, would require extensive and prohibitively expensive infrastructure works, particularly in the City Loop. Instead, it recommended the procurement of single-level trains with a fixed number of cars, increased standing room and a length of 153 metres (502 ft 0 in), with the capacity for expansion to 220 m (721 ft 9 in) upon the opening of the Metro Tunnel. The NDPMR envisaged these trains with a maximum capacity of 1,100 and 1,600 passengers respectively.

The NDPMR envisaged that these high-capacity trains would completely replace the Comeng fleet by 2032, and be used primarily on the Sunshine–Dandenong line created by the Metro Tunnel. Furthermore, it identified the need for the new trains to include cab signalling to reduce the headway required between trains, and for the construction of new maintenance facilities at several points on the network.

Prior to the 2014 state election, then-Premier Denis Napthine promised an order of 25 of the proposed high-capacity trains if his incumbent Liberal–National Coalition state government was returned for a second term. This was part of an unsolicited proposal put forward to the government by train operator Metro Trains Melbourne, and the proposal would also involve the upgrade of the Pakenham and Cranbourne lines. The trains would be built by UGL Rail, who was a partial owner of Metro Trains Melbourne.

=== Order and design phase ===
The Coalition's proposal was criticised by the-then Labor opposition led by Daniel Andrews, labelling it a "con", and that 25 trains were "not enough to meet future passenger numbers". The Coalition subsequently lost the 2014 election and the proposal did not go ahead under the new Labor state government, who instead announced a different proposal in March 2015. Labor's proposal would involve the purchase of 37 new trains via expressions of interest, and an expanded scope of the Pakenham and Cranbourne line upgrades.

In June 2015, expressions of interest were requested for the 37 new trains to be delivered and maintained for the Melbourne rail network. In November 2015, three consortia were shortlisted to build and maintain the 37 trains:

- Bombardier: Bombardier Transportation, Macquarie Bank, Itochu and Infrared Capital Partners
- Eureka Rail: Alstom, Bank of Tokyo-Mitsubishi UFJ and John Laing
- Evolution Rail: Downer Rail, CRRC Changchun Railway Vehicles and Plenary Group

In March 2016, the order was increased to 65.

In September 2016, the contract was awarded to the Evolution Rail consortium. New depots to maintain the trains will be built in Pakenham East and Calder Park. By September of the following year, a full-scale mock-up of two carriages had been constructed and was presented to Minister for Public Transport Jacinta Allan. The mock-up was made available to drivers, technicians, representatives of the Public Transport Users Association and passenger groups including the visually impaired and those with physical disabilities. The Evolution Rail consortium noted that this last stage in the design process marked the fulfilment of the project's first major contractual obligation.

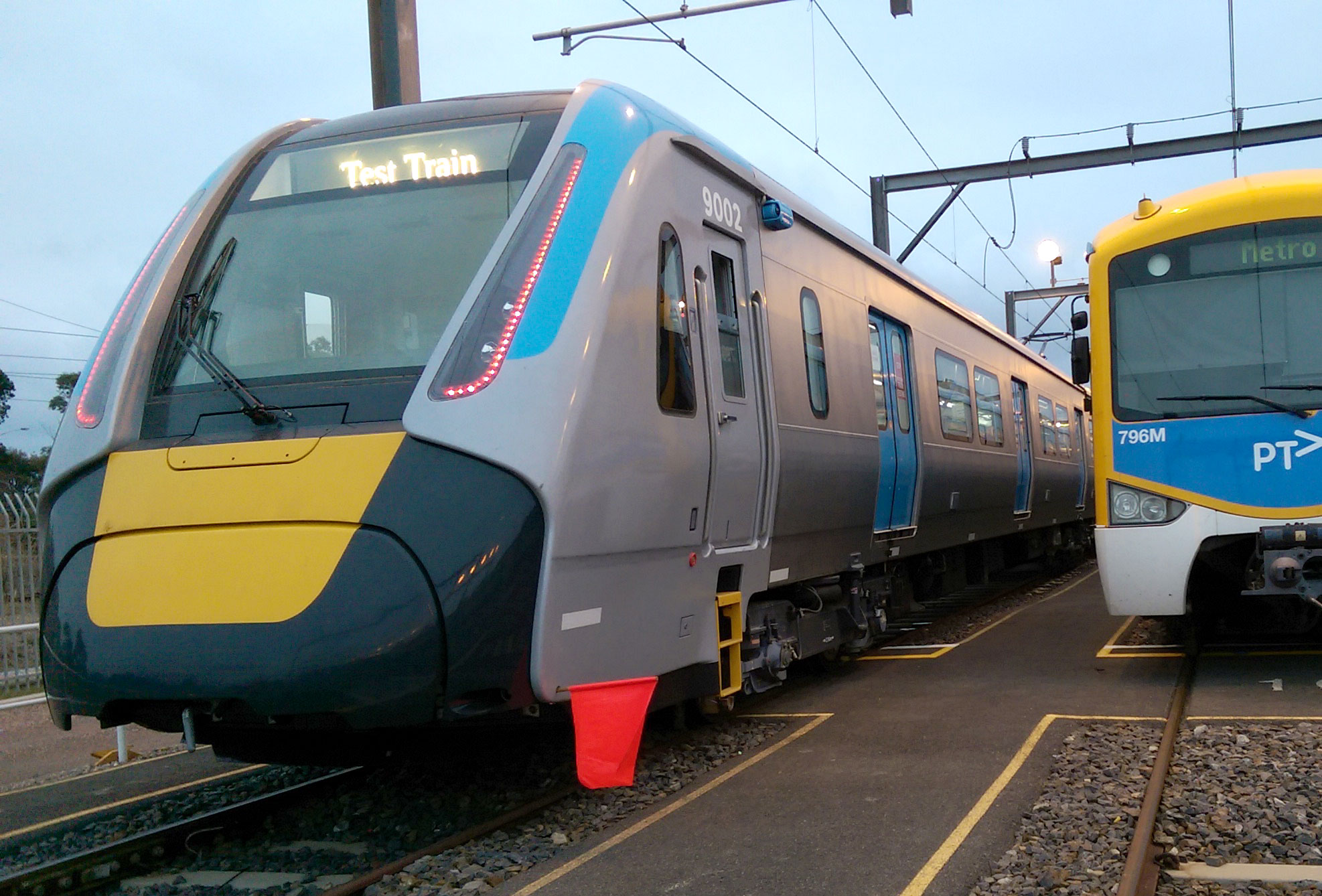
HCMT set 2 undergoing testing at Newport, January 2020

In late 2017, the Locomotive Division of the Victorian Rail Tram and Bus Union lodged proceedings in the Federal Court of Australia against Metro Trains, claiming that the consortium, government and Metro planned to introduce a lower standard of training for operators of the HCMT. It furthermore refused to support the implementation of the new rolling stock unless all electric train drivers were trained in the operation of the HCMT. Among the union's objections to the project are the necessary changes in work practice and the increased automation of certain processes. This followed criticism by the Australian Workers' Union of the decision to award the contract to Evolution Rail instead of Bombardier, the latter of which had an established manufacturing operation in Dandenong. The government announced the awarding of several subcontracts for the project in December.

The mockup carriages used for the consultation phase were placed on public display at Birrarung Marr from 9–17 February 2018. The display concluded during Melbourne's White Night event with a light show.

By June of that year, manufacturing had commenced, with the first body shells arriving at Newport Workshops from CRRC's facility in China.

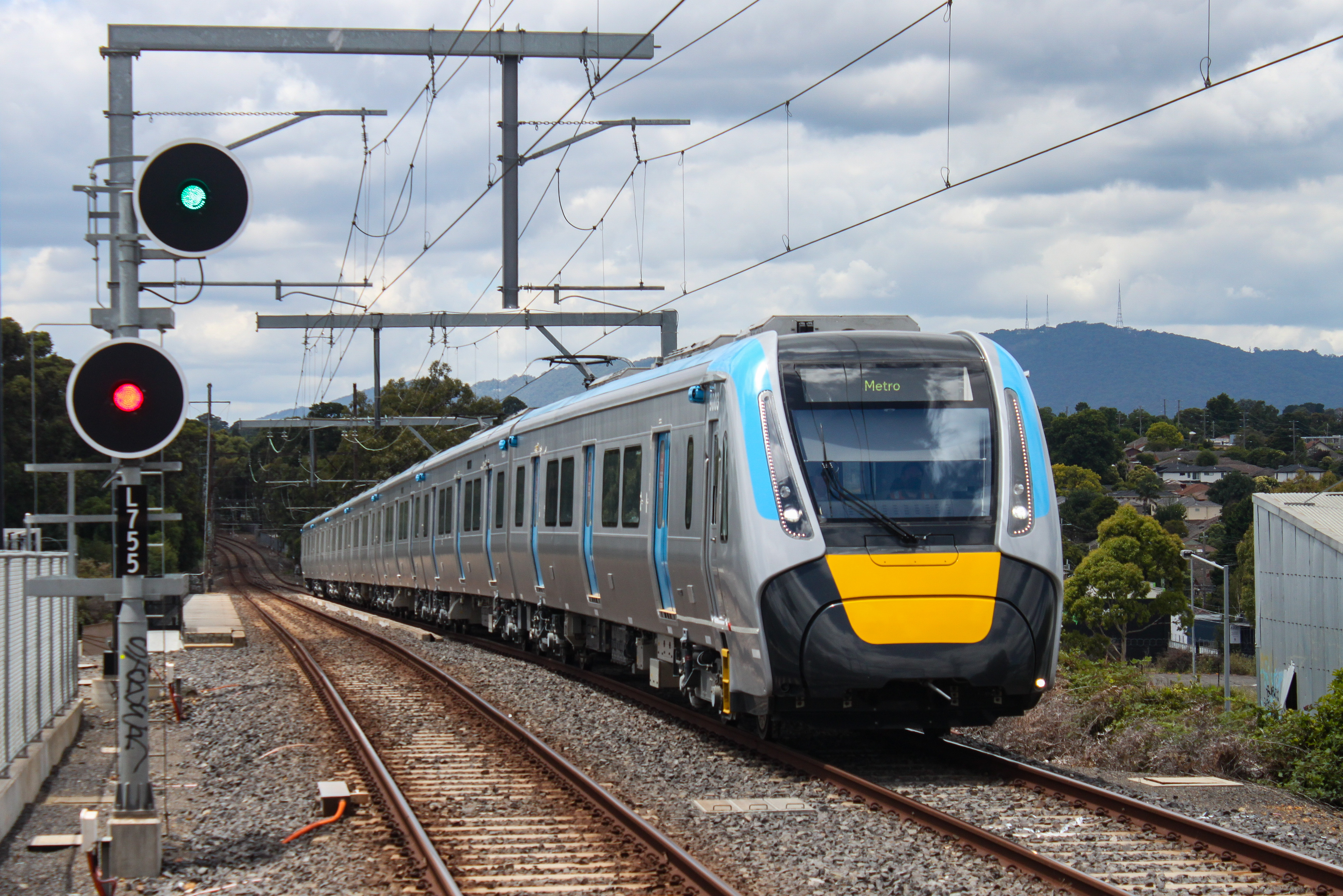
HCMT set 3 rising into Heatherdale returning from testing on the Belgrave line, January 2021

On 9 May 2022, the Victorian Government announced it was procuring an additional 5 HCMT sets for use on the Melbourne Airport rail link, to bring the total order to 70.

== Contract and construction ==
The trains are being delivered as a public–private partnership (PPP) between the State of Victoria and Evolution Rail Pty Ltd, under the Partnerships Victoria agency. The initial contract specified that the consortium would be responsible for the design, construction and delivery of 65 trains, as well as the construction of a heavy maintenance facility and depot in Pakenham East, the construction of a light maintenance facility in Calder Park, and the provision of two simulators for driver training. It also stated that the consortium would be responsible for the maintenance of the HCMTs throughout their lifetime, as well as the operation and maintenance of the depots and simulators over the same time frame.

Evolution Rail is a consortium composed of CRRC Changchun Railway Vehicles, Downer Rail and Plenary Group.

CRRC Changchun led the development and design of the HCMTs, and has made the train bodies in a joint venture with Downer Rail. At least 60% of construction is "local content" from the Victorian manufacturing supply chain. Downer leads the delivery and maintenance of the sets, as well as the construction of the new rail yard facilities. The frames for the bogies were manufactured by Hoffman Engineering in Bendigo. The Australian arm of Times Electric manufactured the traction motors and other electrical systems in Morwell, and SIGMA Air Conditioning built the heating and cooling systems in Derrimut. Assembly of wheel sets and bogies was performed by Downer at Newport Workshops. Plenary Group is responsible for the financial management of the project, and the debt is financed by a group of investment banks led by Westpac.

The contract does not prescribe specific design elements of the HCMTs, but requires the design to fulfil a number of objectives, centred on the provision of a "safe and comfortable journey for passengers".

The total value of the PPP was around $2.3 billion.

== Service ==
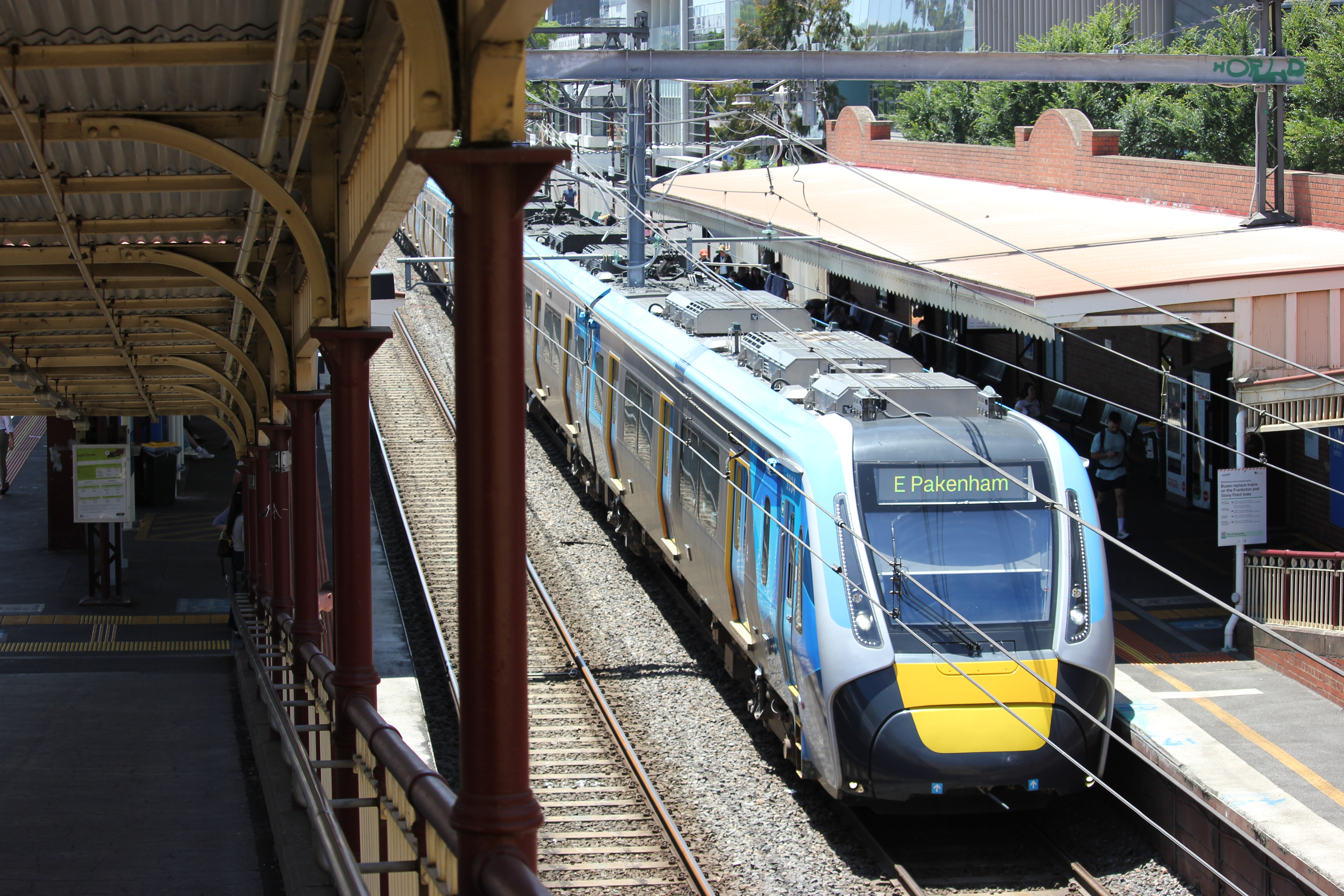
HCMT at South Yarra on a service to East Pakenham, December 2024

The first revenue service for the HCMT was the 8:31am service from Pakenham on the Pakenham line on 27 December 2020. This was an extra service and regular timetabled services didn't commence until 31 January 2021, when the new PTV timetable was introduced. In 2021, high-capacity signalling began being installed on the Cranbourne, Pakenham and Sunbury lines for use by the HCMTs, and the trains began operating revenue services under the new communications-based moving block system in October 2023. HCMTs were progressively rolled out from 2020 until by 2023 they were operating all suburban revenue services on the Cranbourne and Pakenham lines.

Two HCMTs entered the Metro Tunnel in 2023 to begin testing for the opening of service through the tunnel, running at the top tunnel speed of 80 km/h by August 2023.

On 30 October 2023, HCMTs were introduced into revenue service on the Sunbury Line, with two services running in the morning peak from Sunbury to Flinders Street station, then continuing on to Pakenham Station on the Pakenham line. This followed power upgrades, new signalling and platform extensions as part of the Sunbury Line Upgrade to allow for the trains.

Service frequency increased on 30 November 2025 coinciding with the soft-opening of the Metro Tunnel, with HCMTs providing extra services along the Sunbury Line. On 1 February 2026, the fleet commenced full-time operation on the Sunbury line, marking the completion of the HCMT rollout along for that Line.

== Design ==
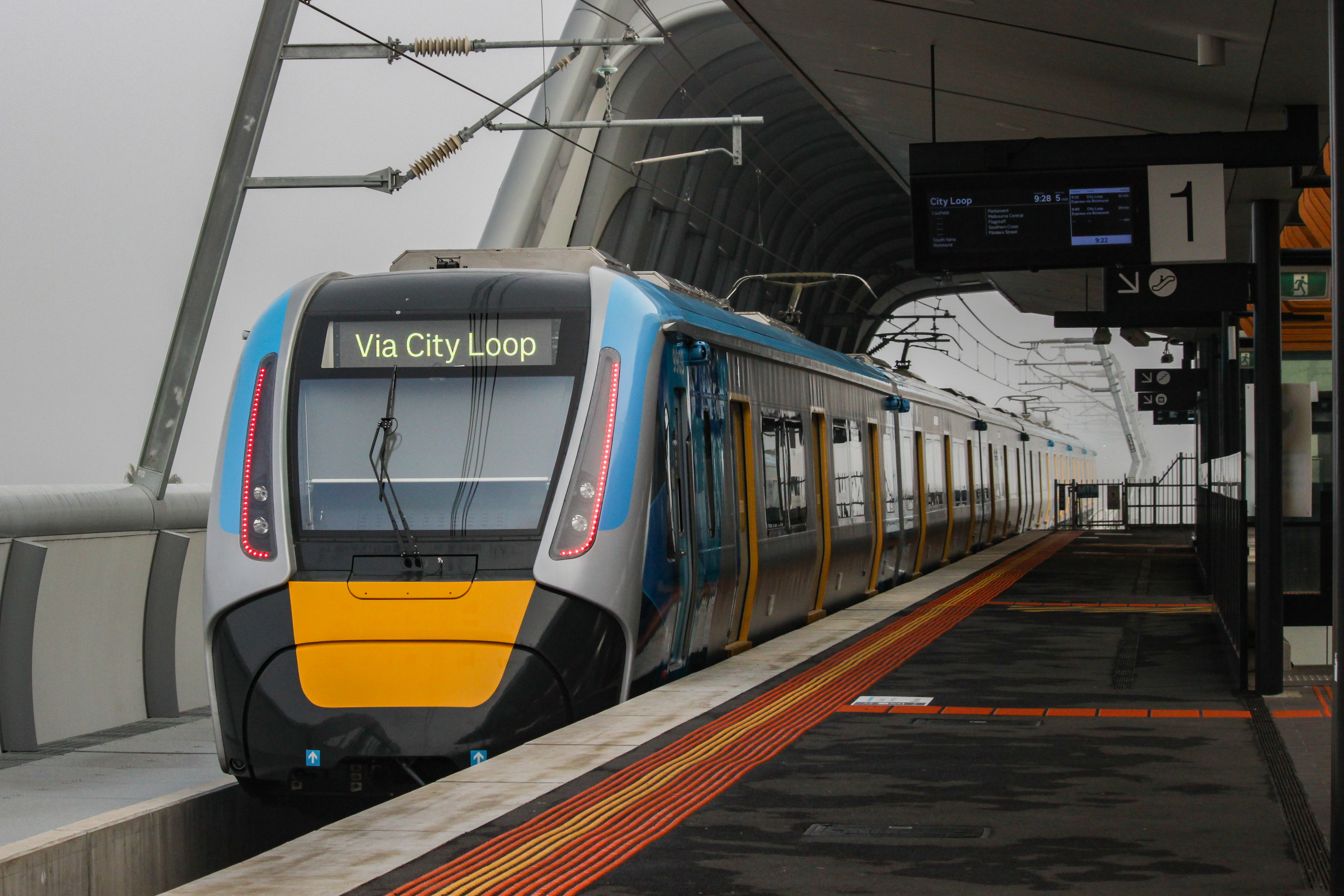
HCMT set 9 at Carnegie, June 2021

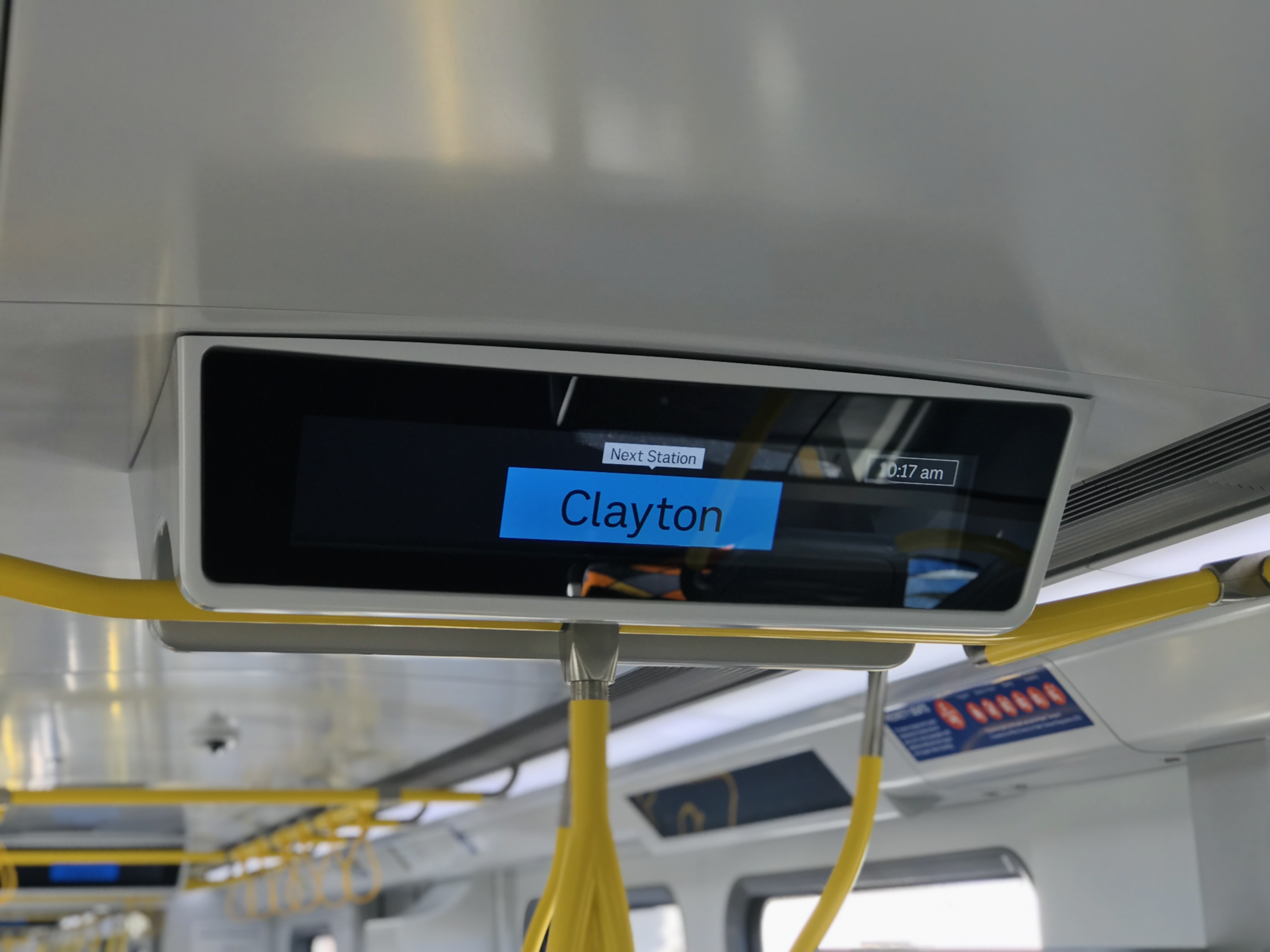
PIDs within the carriage

The HCMT are based on the Type A design used by CRRC Changchun. The train is sometimes known by its model number designated by CRRC Changchun, CCD5006, which belongs to its CCD series rapid transit trains. The trains have seven carriages, with a total passenger capacity of 1,380, with the ability to add three more carriages for a capacity of more than 1,970. An aerodynamic nose cone and retractable cover for the couplers at each end of the trains were included to reduce the incidence of train surfing when the HCMTs are in operation. They are designed for easy conversion to dual voltage operation at either 1,500 V DC or 3 kV DC by the installation of an electrical cabinet containing IGBT-based DC-to-DC converter, line reactors and line filters, without needing to modify the traction inverters or traction motors.

Approximately 30–40% of passengers are seated when the train is at full capacity. The standing areas of the train offer multiple types of straps and handles for the safety of standing passengers, and wide doors for rapid ingress and egress from these areas. There are seventy passenger information displays (PIDs) in each train, showing the next station, current time, and the train's location on an adapted rail map. Displays on the front and sides of the train indicate its destination. Twenty-eight wheelchair spaces and wide aisles between seats enable easy access for passengers with disabilities.

A number of semi-automated features are included in the HCMT design, including the capacity for automated low-speed shunting by Automated Train Operation (ATO) and for trains to be started without the presence of a driver. The trains also automatically estimate the passenger load, and the reading can be accessed remotely. The trains are equipped with Alstom's Cityflo 650 CBTC signalling, letting them run mostly automatically on some parts of the network. To date however the HCMTs are not allowed to be in motion without the presence of a human driver. Furthermore, the HCMTs include digital 'stopping aids' to maximise accuracy of the position of train's arrival at platforms. Drivers will also have the capacity to open individual doors on the trains.

	HCMT rolling stock configuration						
Car position	1	2	3	4	5	6	7
Pantograph		<	<		>	>	
Car type	90xx (Tc)	91xx (DMp)	92xx (Mp1)	93xx (DT)	97xx (Mp2)	98xx (DMp)	99xx (Tc)
Main features	Control cab	Inter-car door		Inter-car door		Inter-car door	Control cab
Sanded axles	0	1	2	0	2	1	0
Numbers	9001 : 9070	9101 : 9170	9201 : 9270	9301 : 9370	9701 : 9770	9801 : 9870	9901 : 9970

== Bibliography ==
- Network Development Plan – Metropolitan Rail (PDF). Public Transport Victoria. December 2012. Archived from the original (PDF) on 9 September 2017.
- High Capacity Metro Trains Project: Project Summary (PDF). Department of Economic Development, Jobs, Transport and Resources. February 2017. Archived from the original (PDF) on 20 May 2017.
