= The Railway Advocate =

Defunct Australian trade union newspaper

- "The Oldest Established All Grades Railway Journal" (1952)
- The Railway Advocate, 17 March 1952
- Type: Monthly journal
- Format: Tabloid
- Owner: Australian Railways Union
- Publisher: Advocate Newspaper Co. Ltd.
- Founded: 1 September 1919
- Ceased publication: 31 August 1993
- Headquarters: Brisbane Trades Hall
- City: Brisbane
- Country: Australia
- Price: Three-pence (1920); Two Pence (1952)

The Railway Advocate was an Australian monthly trade union newspaper published by the Queensland branch of the Australian Railways Union (ARU).

== History ==
Founded as The Militant by the Queensland Railways Union in 1919, the paper was renamed The Advocate in 1921 following the union's amalgamation with other state branches to form the ARU. It was again renamed in 1952 and remained The Railway Advocate until publication ceased in 1993.

== Digitisation ==
The paper has been digitised as part of the Australian Newspapers Digitisation Program of the National Library of Australia.

== Gallery ==
First edition of The Militant, 1 September 1919

The Advocate, 10 April 1922
