= Rail, Tram, and Bus Union =

Transport union in Australia

Rail, Tram, and Bus Industry Union
- Australian Rail Tram and Bus Industry Union
- Predecessor: Australian Railways Union; Australian Federated Union of Locomotive Employees; Australian Tramway and Motor Omnibus Employees' Association; National Union of Rail Workers of Australia
- Founded: 1 March 1993
- Headquarters: Trades Hall, 4 Goulburn Street, Sydney, New South Wales, Australia
- Members: 35,178 (December 2025)
- National President: Victor Moore
- National Secretary: Alex Claassens
- Affiliations: ACTU, ITF, ALP
- Website: www.rtbu.org.au

The Rail, Tram, and Bus Industry Union (RTBU) is an Australian trade union representing rail, tram and bus workers. The RTBU is affiliated with the Australian Council of Trade Unions and the Australian Labor Party.

Internationally, the RTBU is affiliated with the International Transport Workers' Federation. It has a membership of 35,178 as at December 2025.

== History ==
The union's history goes back to 1861, with the formation of the Locomotive Engine Drivers Association in Victoria. The Public Transport Union was formed on 1 March 1993 through the amalgamation of four long-standing transport unions: the Australian Railways Union, the Australian Federated Union of Locomotive Employees, the Australian Tramway and Motor Omnibus Employees' Association and the National Union of Rail Workers of Australia. The amalgamation created one union for public transport workers for the first time in Australia. It adopted its current name in 1998.

== Structure ==
The RTBU is organised into National Divisions, covering Infrastructure; Rail Operations; Tram and Bus; Locomotive; Workshops and Salaried and Professional. There are seven state branches, with the National Office located in Sydney:

- New South Wales
- Queensland
- South Australia and Northern Territory
- Victoria
- Tasmania
- Western Australia

== Gallery ==
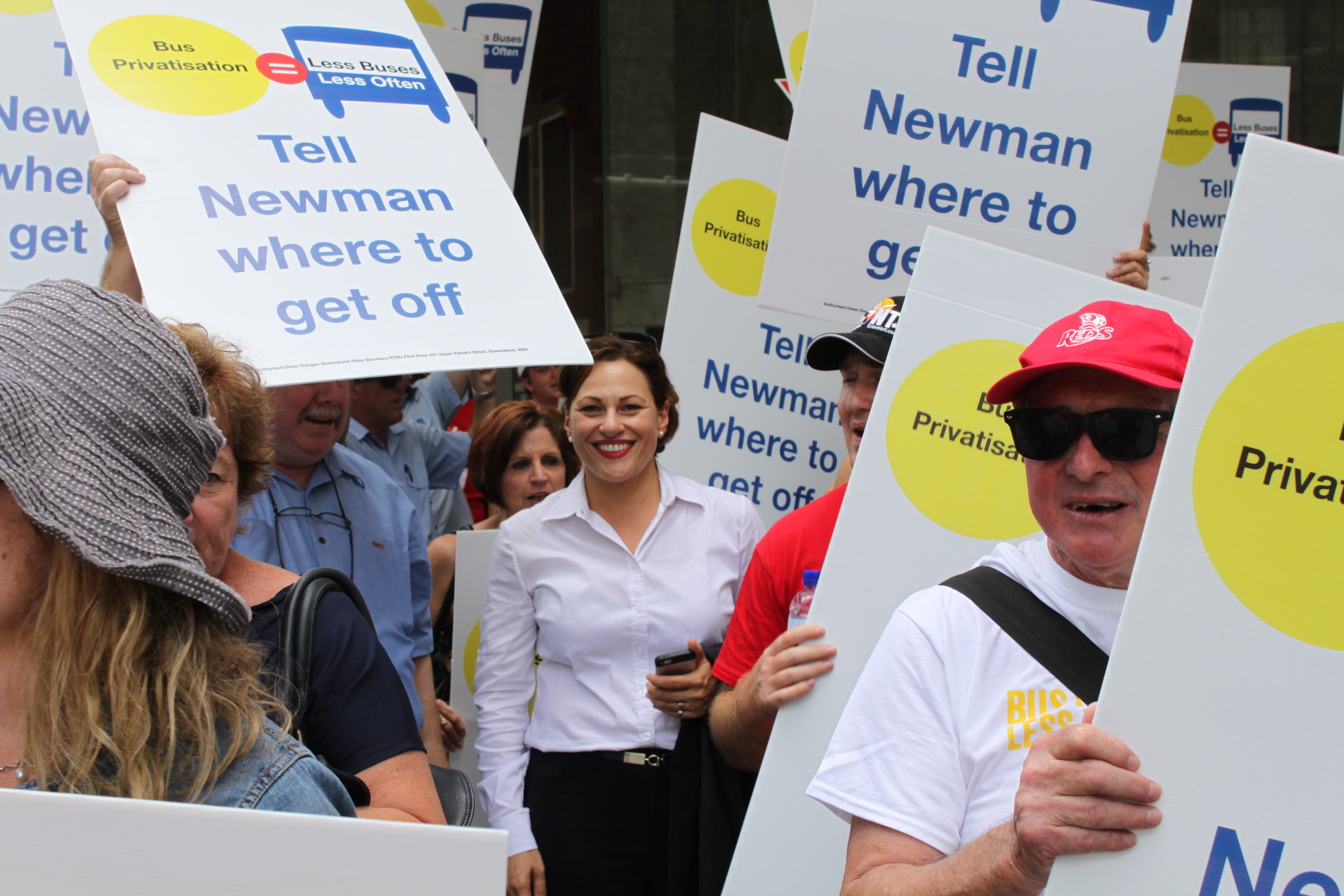
RTBU Queensland rally against the Newman government, Brisbane 2015

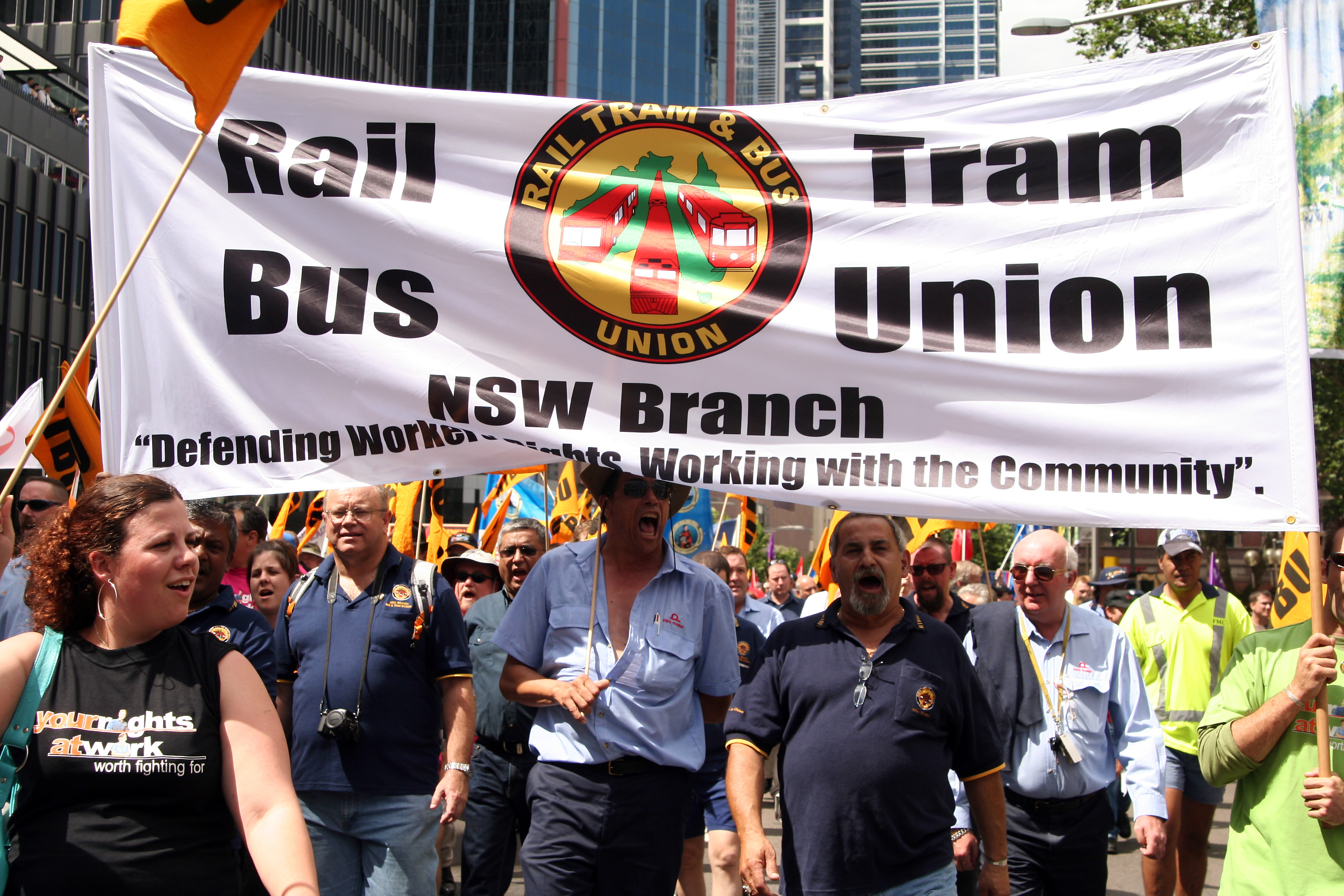
RTBU New South Wales members protesting WorkChoices, 2005

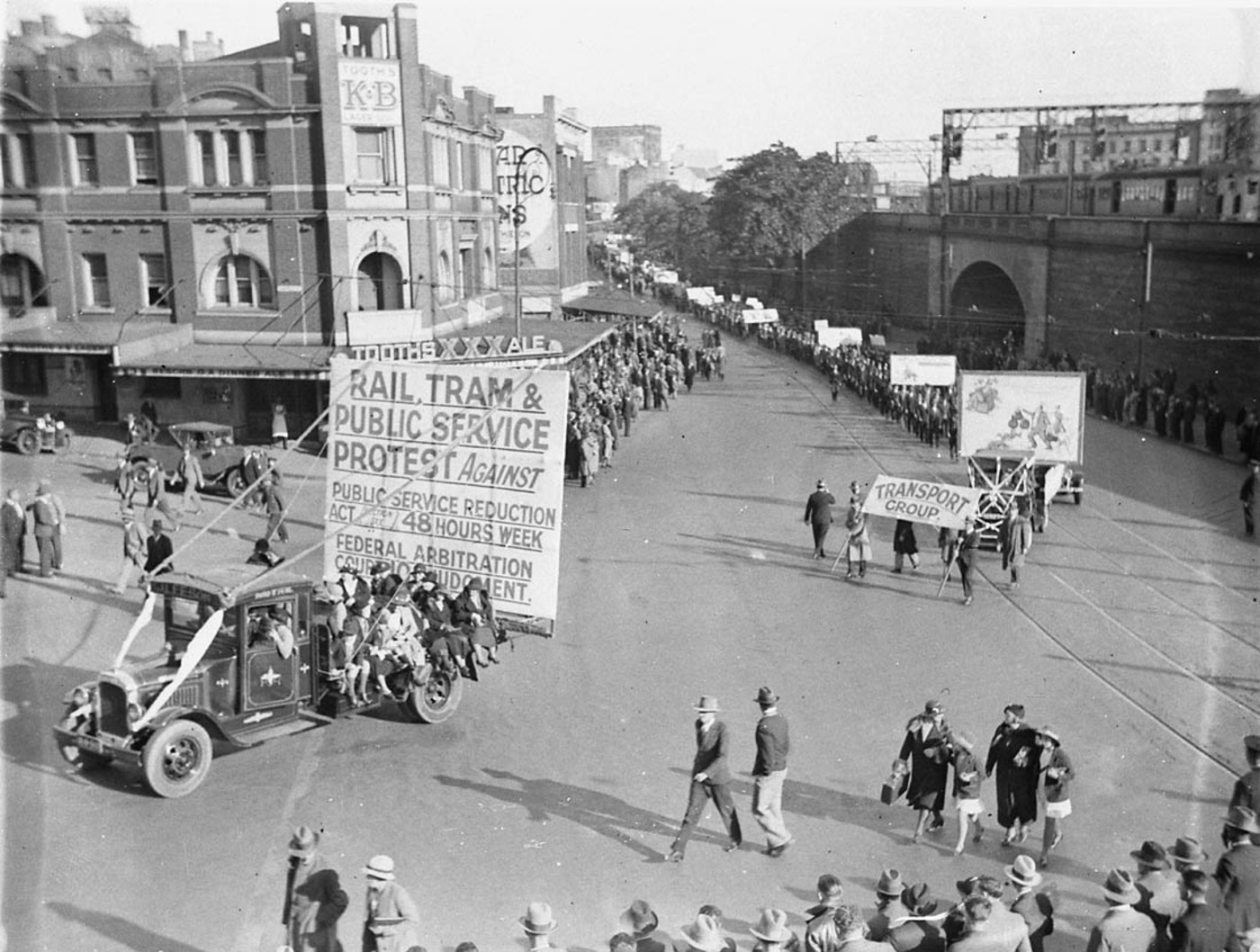
Rail, tram and public service unions protesting against the Public Service Reduction Act, 1934

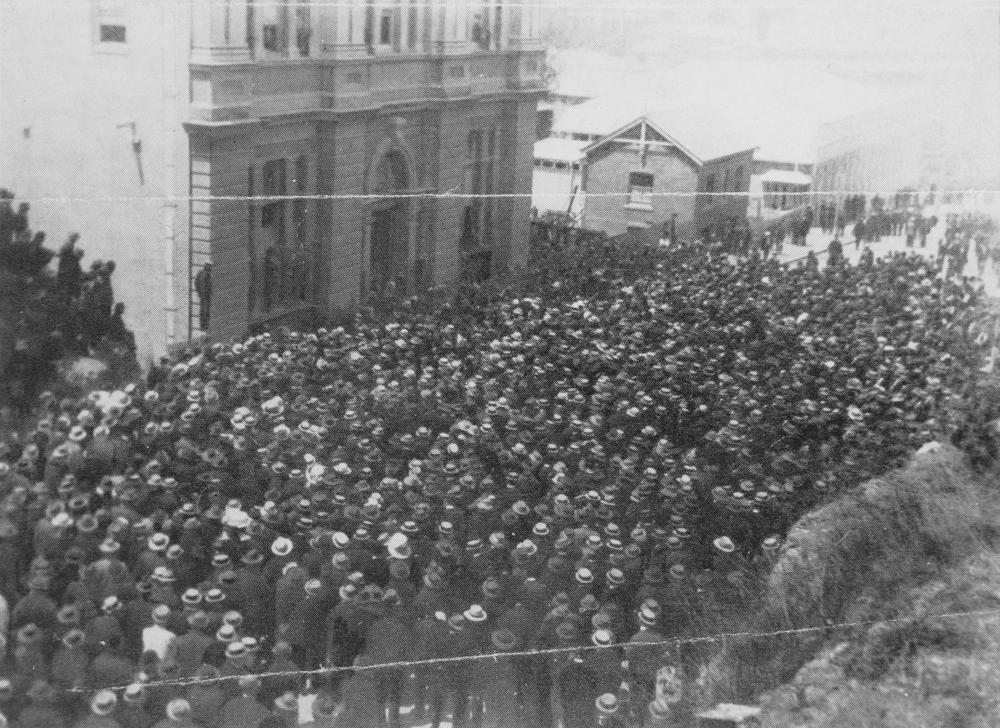
Union members outside Brisbane Trades Hall during the 1912 tram strike

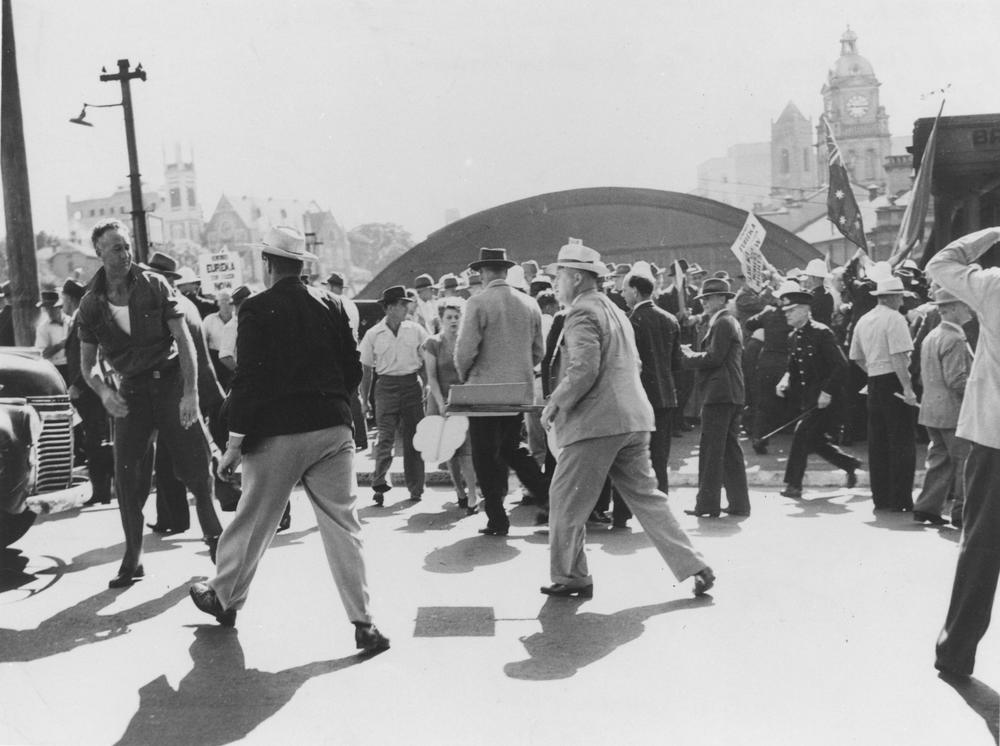
Railway Workers' strike, Brisbane, 1948

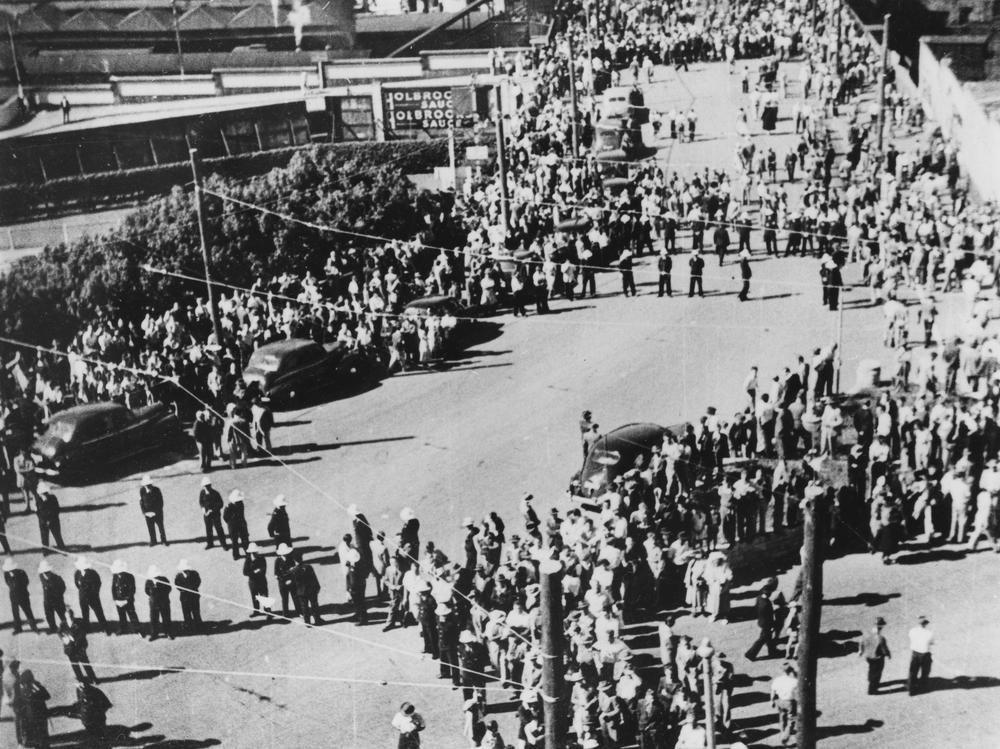
Crowds and police in Edward Street in front of the Trades Hall during the Railways Strike, Brisbane, 1948

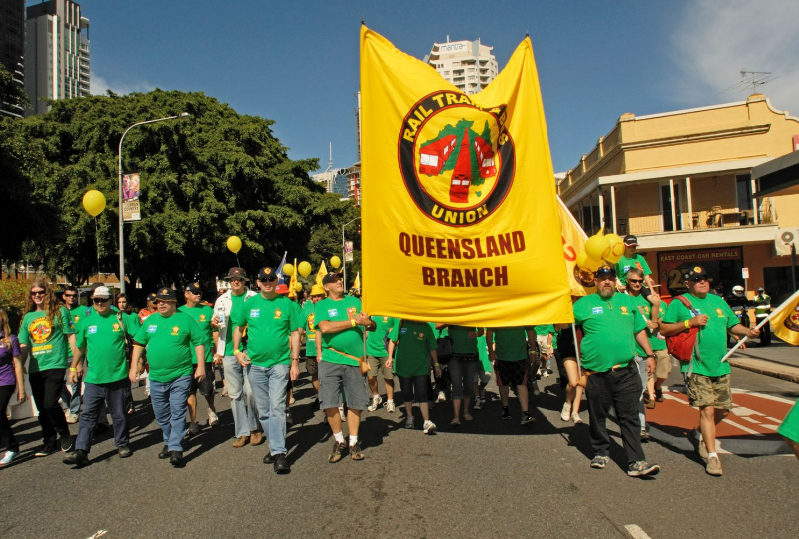
RTBU supporters carrying a banner in the Brisbane Labour Day March, 2012

== See also ==
- Railway trade unions in Australia
