= Australian Tramway and Motor Omnibus Employees' Association =

Transport industry trade union in Australia

The Australian Tramway and Motor Omnibus Employees' Association was an Australian trade union, in operation from 1910 to 1950 and from 1950 until 1993. It was founded as the Australian Tramway Employees Union, but was renamed to include bus employees in 1934.

The union was deregistered on 16 March 1950 for having "repudiated arbitration and decisions of a constituted authority" due to the actions of the Victorian branch in the 1950 Victorian tramway strike. The strike ended on 26 April, with one of the conditions being that the Tramways Board would not oppose re-registration. It was then re-registered in December 1950, despite objections from the City of Brisbane and six rival unions, including the Transport Workers' Union.

On 15 May 1969 Clarrie O'Shea, the Victorian State Secretary of the union, was jailed by John Kerr for contempt of the Industrial Court after he disobeyed a court order that his union pay $8,100 in fines, under the penal sections of the Conciliation and Arbitration Act. This triggered a major national strike to demand "Free Clarrie and repeal the penal powers". On the sixth day, O'Shea was released when the fines were paid by a man who claimed to have won the New South Wales lottery.

The union merged with the Australian Federated Union of Locomotive Employees, the National Union of Rail Workers of Australia and the Australian Railways Union to form the Australian Rail Tram and Bus Industry Union in 1993.
