= Clarrie O'Shea =

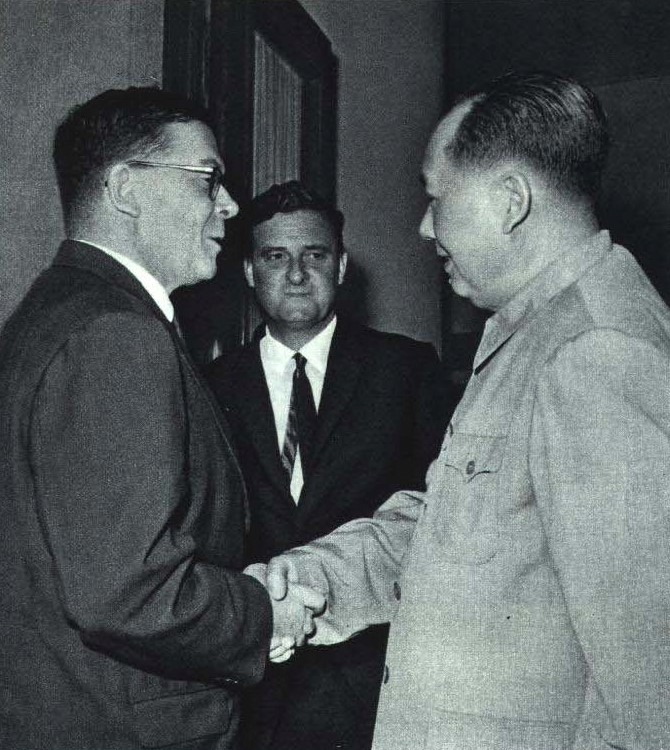
O'Shea (centre) with Ted Hill and Mao Zedong in 1964

Clarence Lyell O'Shea, more commonly known as Clarrie O'Shea (1906–1988), was the Victorian State Secretary of the Australian Tramway and Motor Omnibus Employees' Association. He was jailed in 1969 by Sir John Kerr for contempt of the Industrial Court when he disobeyed a court order that his union pay $8,100 in fines, under the penal sections of the Conciliation and Arbitration Act.

A lifelong Communist, O'Shea was a leading member of the pro-China Communist Party of Australia (Marxist-Leninist) (CPA(ML)) at the time he was imprisoned.

== Biography ==
In January 1949, the Tramways Union's new moderate executive instructed secretary Clarrie O'Shea to repudiate attacks on Trades Hall Council officials published in Trade Union News, threatening discipline if he failed to comply. However, in February, the union's rank and file rejected that repudiation by secret ballot, delivering a rebuke to the right-wing leadership and effectively backing O'Shea's position.

== 1969 Arrest and general strike ==
O'Shea's jailing triggered the largest postwar national strike, largely organised by left unions, despite the opposition of the Victorian Trades Hall Council and the Labor Council of New South Wales. A million workers stopped work over six days, with the demand to "Free Clarrie and repeal the penal powers". On the sixth day, O'Shea was released when the fines were paid by a man who claimed to have won the New South Wales lottery.

Over the previous five years, the Tramways Union had militantly defended and improved the conditions of its members. The union had accumulated 40 fines totalling $13,200, imposed by the Conciliation and Arbitration Court. Due to the inaction of Melbourne Trades Hall, twenty seven left-wing unions caucused together in response to the perceived attacks on unionism by the widespread application of fines. They called a mass delegates meeting for the day of the hearing that was attended by 5,000. After the meeting, they marched to the courthouse, led by Clarrie O'Shea.

In court on Thursday 15 May 1969, O'Shea refused to take the oath, then refused to present the union books, in line with the wishes of the members of his union He was formally arrested and sentenced for contempt of court, and taken to Pentridge Prison. That led to immediate walk-outs, and a general strike which paralysed Victoria on the Friday. There were two 24-hour stoppages in Victoria, involving 40 unions. All trains and trams stopped, the delivery of goods was severely restricted, there were power cuts, and TV and radio broadcasts were disrupted. Protests and strike action also occurred in regional Victoria, with the Geelong Trades Hall Council supporting the strikes and similar action in Bendigo, Ballarat and the Latrobe Valley.

All together, about 500,000 workers struck across Australia on Friday, 16 May. The Trades and Labour Council of WA, the Queensland Trades and Labour Council and the United Trades and Labour Council of South Australia all called statewide general strikes. In Queensland, mass meetings or strikes occurred in 20 cities, while Trades and Labour Councils in Newcastle, Wollongong and Canberra called out members of affiliated unions. The Tasmanian Trades and Labour Council refused to sanction any action, but 22 "rebel" affiliated unions, representing 50,000 workers (80% of Tasmania's workforce), organised a general stoppage.

Protests calling for O'Shea's release occurred outside Pentridge prison in Coburg over the weekend.

On Tuesday 20 May, Dudley MacDougall, a former advertising manager for the Australian Financial Review, acting on "behalf of a public benefactor", paid the union's fines and Kerr ordered that O'Shea be released. Although the penal laws were not repealed, they have never been used again.
