= Communist Party of Australia (Marxist–Leninist) =

Far-left political party in Australia

Communist Party of Australia (Marxist–Leninist) (Note: The name of the party, and its abbreviation, has been described in multiple alternate ways, including: Communist Party of Australia (M.L.); Communist Party of Australia (M–L); CPA (M–L); CPA (M.L.))
- Abbreviation: CPA (ML)
- Founders: Ted Hill (Note: Among two-hundred former CPA members, the Central Committee elected four people to three positions.); Paddy Malone; Clarrie O'Shea; Frank Johnson
- Founded: 15 March 1964; 62 years ago
- Split from: Communist Party of Australia
- Headquarters: Fitzroy, Melbourne
- Newspaper: Vanguard
- Membership (1985): c. 300–400 (Note: Although Macintyre does not identify a specific number or date, he states, in The Party: The Communist Party of Australia From Heyday to Reckoning, that the party never achieved more than three-hundred members during its early years.)
- Ideology: Communism; Marxism–Leninism–Maoism; Anti-revisionism
- Political position: Far-left
- International affiliation: ICOR (since 2019)
- Colors: Red
- Slogan: "For an independent and socialist Australia.”
- House of Representatives: 0 / 151
- Senate: 0 / 76

Unofficial flag

Website
- cpaml.org

The Communist Party of Australia (Marxist–Leninist) (CPA (ML)) is an Australian communist and Marxist–Leninist–Maoist party founded in 1964. The party's origins derived from a split within the Communist Party of Australia (CPA), stemming from the Sino-Soviet split. The party describes its ideology as being influenced by the works of Karl Marx, Friedrich Engels, Vladimir Lenin, Joseph Stalin, Mao Zedong and Ted Hill.

The party adheres to what it calls the "iceberg principle": "A few members are seen and open about their membership to allow the organisation to be accessible to the working class, while the membership of the majority remains largely unknown, revealed appropriately as their workplace, community and personal circumstances demand."

== Foundation ==
The Communist Party of Australia (Marxist–Leninist) (CPA (ML)) was formed in March 1964 by former members of the Communist Party of Australia (CPA). Ted Hill, among an estimated two-hundred others, lead a "Marxist–Leninist Conference" in which the party was formally founded. They also outlined their disagreements with the leadership of the CPA, contemporary issues, and the future of socialism. The party was founded following the split within the CPA, which stemmed from the Sino-Soviet split of the early '60s. The founders of the CPA (ML) (Ted Hill, Paddy Malone, Clarrie O'Shea, F. Johnson) rejected and denounced the leadership of the CPA as revisionist as well as their pro-Soviet position under Nikita Khrushchev, among many others.

First Central Committee Office-bearers

Position	Name
Chairman	Ted Hill
Vice-Chairman	Paddy Malone
Vice-Chairman	Clarrie O'Shea
Secretary	Frank Johnson

== History ==
=== 1970s–1990s ===
The party exerted sizeable influence on the militant student movement in Australia during the late 1960s and early 1970s on campuses such as Monash University and La Trobe University in Melbourne as well as Flinders University in Adelaide through their affiliate, the Worker-Student Alliance. A notable leader of the Worker-Student Alliance at this time was veteran political activist Albert Langer.

The party also held considerable sway within the Australian trade union movement from inception through to the 1980s. Clarrie O'Shea was party Vice-President at the time of his gaoling in 1969, which led to an unprecedented general strike across Australia until his release was secured. Norm Gallagher led the Builders Labourers Federation for over a decade, a time during which he was a nationally known and controversial figure. Other party members, such as John Cummins and Jim Bacon were also prominent BLF figures throughout the 1970s and 1980s. In the years following the de-registration of the BLF in 1986, CPA (M-L) influence within the union movement began to decline.

During the 1980s and 1990s the majority of the founding members of the CPA (M-L) died or retired. Ted Hill's retirement in 1986 and death in 1988 left the party without its most recognised public figure.

=== Current activity ===
The party ceased publishing a hard copy version of its newspaper Vanguard on a regular basis at the end of 2014. However, it continues to publish a special May Day edition of the paper each year, and releases various other publications periodically. It is unknown how many members the party has as it maintains strict adherence to its founding policy of the vast majority of members keeping their party membership secret. They have had a new website since 25 October 2014.

In June 2019, the party affiliated formally with the International Coordination of Revolutionary Parties and Organizations (ICOR).

In June 2025, the Central Committee of the party expressed solidarity with the Eureka Initiative, a Marxist–Leninist organisation in Australia that focuses on Australian republicanism and gaining the support of the youth.

== See also ==
- List of anti-revisionist groups
