= Australian Transport Officers' Federation =

Australian transport industry trade union

The Australian Transport Officers' Federation (ATOF) was an Australian trade union representing salaried officers in the transport sector, particularly in the rail and airline industries. It existed from 1924 until 1991, and was previously known as the Federation of Salaried Officers of Railways Commissioners (1924–1947) and the Australasian Transport Officers Federation (1947–1978). The union had a policy of supporting conciliation and arbitration and against strike action until 1970.

== History ==
The Federation was formed in 1924 through the merger of the Railway and Tramway Officers' Association, based in NSW, and the Victorian Railways Administrative Officers' and Clerks' Association. The NSW body had been founded in 1913, while Victorian association had been registered in February 1921 following a High Court decision that gave workers in "state instrumentalities" access to the Commonwealth Arbitration Court. The association sought to represent the interests of railway officers as distinct from railway workers more broadly. The association sought to form a national union and formed agreements with similar unions in other states, which applied for federal registration as the Federation of Salaried Officers of Railways Commissioners. It met fierce opposition from the union movement, resulting in the case lingering before the industrial registrar for three years. The union argued that a separate union was necessary because officers in responsible positions having to be part of a general organisation would "result in a complete subversion of discipline" and the Australian Railways Union was "inclined to support affiliations with which responsible officers should not be associated".

The union was eventually registered federally in September 1924 and was headquartered in Sydney. O. A. Meyer, the president of the NSW Railway and Tramway Officers' Association, became the union's president, while P. Hunt was general secretary. In November 1925, when it held its first triennial conference, it had 5300 members in New South Wales, 1000 in South Australia and 850 in Victoria, and were attempting to convince state organisations in Queensland, Tasmania and Western Australia to join. The union spoke openly about what they viewed as their need to remain non-political and non-partisan because of their "duty to comply with the directions and tender loyal service to whatever Government might be in power". The union initially barred women from joining, objecting to women being appointed to positions that had been previously occupied by men. In 1928 announced its opposition to the employment of women for other than mechanical office work, and in 1931 it advocated female typists being fired before male clerks faced further rationing. In the mid-1930s, the union began campaigning for appointments and promotions to be determined by an appointments board with an independent chairman, in response to widespread discontent with the process then in use. The union adamantly opposed strike action in the 1946 Victorian railway strike, and claimed to have recruited new members from the Australian Railways Union in the aftermath.

In 1947, the union renamed itself the Australasian Transport Officers' Federation and sought to expand its coverage to include air, road and railway employees, although membership at first remained constitutionally limited to "transport officers of the Crown. In August 1947, the union established a Tasmanian branch for the first time. The union initially remained limited to representing railway officers; however, in 1948 it began breaking into the airline industry, establishing a Trans Australia Airlines special branch to deal with the new members. The broadening of the union's coverage met with opposition from the Federated Clerks' Union. It would also later extend to include Qantas employees. In 1950, the union wavered on its opposition to strike action, with the SA branch resolving to consider it if an appeals board were not instituted, and in Victoria in protest at non-striking members being stood down without pay during other unions' strike action; however, no action was taken.

In 1970, the union finally broke with its policy against strike action, with both Victorian and NSW railway members taking industrial action in response to disputes in their states, repeated again several times during the 1970s and 1980s, although the union was still seen as more conservative than the ARU. In 1979, the union placed a "black ban" on independent NSW state MP John Hatton after he called for an inquiry into alleged corruption in the transport department, resulting in a parliamentary resolution rebuking the union and an end to the ban. In 1990, following the 1989 Australian pilots' dispute, four airlines sought orders that their pilots be covered by the Transport Officers Federation, rather than the Australian Federation of Air Pilots, the union which had gone on strike the previous year.

In April 1991, the Transport Officers' Federation voted to merge with the Municipal Officers Association of Australia and the Technical Service Guild of Australia to form the Australian Municipal Transport Energy Water Ports Community & Information Services Union. The amalgamated union, which took effect from 1 July 1991, was often known as the Australian Services Union, and later formed the modern Australian Services Union after a series of mergers with other unions.
