= History of Australian currency =

Prior to European colonisation, early Aboriginal Australian communities traded using items such as tools, food, ochres, shells, raw materials and stories, although there is no evidence of the use of currencies.

After colonisation on 26 January 1788, New South Wales became a British colony, and was provided with English currency to be used for formal circulation, though the supply was insufficient and alternative forms of exchange were resorted to. A national Australian currency was created in 1910, as the Australian Pound, which in 1966 was decimalised as the Australian Dollar.

From the early 19th century until 1971, the exchange rate of Australian currency was fixed to the British pound. After the dissolution of the Bretton Woods Agreement in 1971, it was fixed to the United States dollar until, in 1974, it was fixed to a trade weighted index. In 1976, this was changed from a 'hard', to a 'crawling' peg, meaning the exchange rate was changed more frequently. In 1983, Australia changed to a free-floating exchange rate.

== Early Australian experience ==
The first permanent European settlement of Australia took place on 26 January 1788 at Port Jackson (modern Sydney, New South Wales). One very important British oversight during the colonization was the provision of adequate coinage for the new colony. In November 1788, Governor Phillip requested a remittance of money from England and in 1792 Kitty arrived with almost 4500 Spanish dollars. However, the dollars slowly left the colony as they were used to pay for goods brought in by visiting ships.

The colony of New South Wales barely survived its first years and was largely neglected for much of the following quarter-century while the British government was preoccupied until 1815 with the Napoleonic Wars. Because of the shortage of any sort of money, the real means of exchange during the first 25 years of settlement was rum, the access to which was controlled by the officers of the New South Wales Corps, who benefited most from access to land and imported goods.

Of necessity, various foreign coins were in circulation in the colony, and in 1800, in an attempt to put some order into the economy, Governor Philip Gidley King issued a proclamation setting the value of the various foreign coins in the colony, though it did not solve the problem. During this period, to protect the lucrative access to the imported rum, as well as other grievances, the officers, who came to be known as the Rum Corps, deposed the governor in a standoff in 1808, referred to as the Rum Rebellion. The New South Wales Corps was recalled soon after. Otherwise, the shortage of coinage persisted. For example, between 1811 and 1816 Governor Lachlan Macquarie paid the contractors who built the Sydney Hospital with 200,000 litres (54,000 US gal) of rum, later increased to 270,000 litres (72,000 US gal).

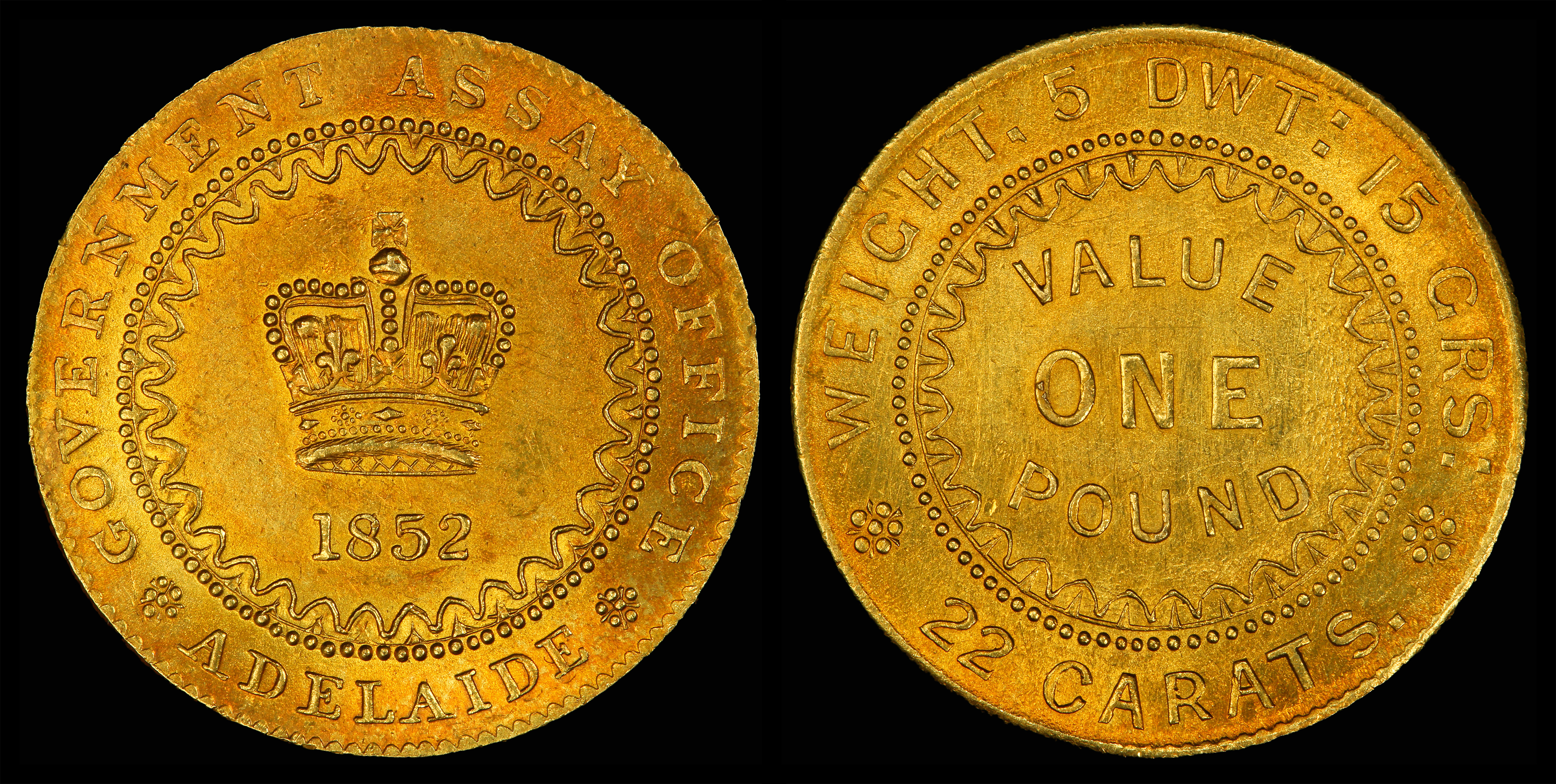
The 1852 Adelaide Pound weighs 8.75 grams (0.281 ozt) on average, and with a fineness of 0.9170 has 8.02 grams (0.2580 ozt) of gold in it.

The first coinage issued by the colony took place in 1813, when Governor Macquarie ordered the middle of the £10,000, equivalent to A$816,810 in 2022, in Spanish dollars sent by the British government be punched out. This process created two parts: a small coin, which was called the dump, and a ring, which was called a holey dollar. One holey dollar was worth five shillings (a quarter of one pound sterling), and one dump was worth one shilling and three pence (or one quarter of a holey dollar). The objective of this exercise was to keep the coins in New South Wales, as they would be valueless elsewhere. In 1817, the first bank, the Bank of New South Wales, was established, which issued private bank notes denominated in pounds. Acceptance of these private bank notes was not compulsory as legal tender, though they were widely used and accepted.

In 1825, an imperial order-in-council was issued for the purpose of introducing sterling coinage to all the British colonies. This was due to the introduction of the gold standard in the UK in 1816, and a decline in the supply of Spanish Dollars, due to the revolutions taking place in Spanish South American colonies. Most of the dollars used had been minted in Lima, Mexico City, and Potosí, which had become part of new Latin American republics, independent from Spain.

On 17 December, £30,000 worth of sterling crowns, half-crowns, shillings and sixpences were shipped to New South Wales to be used as currency. The silver coins could be exchanged for commissariat bills which could be exchanged for British gold coins, creating a gold exchange standard. The government took steps to encourage the use of the sterling coins by gradually diminishing the exchange value of dollars. By August 1829, £55,000, equivalent to A$7,109,417 in 2022, had been imported, and it was ordered that no foreign coins should be received in official payments. The transition was protracted by industrial disputes, but was complete by the mid-1830s.

In 1852, the Government Assay Office in Adelaide issued gold pound coins. These weighed slightly more than sovereigns. After gold was discovered in Australia, the Royal Mint opened branches in Australia. The Sydney Mint opened in 1854 and issued half sovereigns and sovereigns, with the Melbourne Mint beginning production in 1872. Many of the sovereigns minted in Australia were for use in India as part of a plan that the gold sovereign should become the imperial coin. As it turned out, India was already too entrenched in the Rupee system, and the gold sovereigns obtained by the treasury in India never left the vaults.

== State of currency at federation ==
At federation in 1901 and for a period afterwards, the currency used in the Australian colonies which became states consisted of British silver and copper coins, Australian minted gold sovereigns (worth £1) and half sovereigns, locally minted copper trade tokens (suppressed in 1881, some state earlier) and private bank notes. In addition, the Queensland government issued treasury notes (1866–1869) and banknotes (1893–1910) which were legal tender in Queensland; and the New South Wales government issued a limited series of treasury notes in 1893. The Perth Mint opened in 1899, at which gold miners would deposit their raw gold for gold coins.

== National currency ==
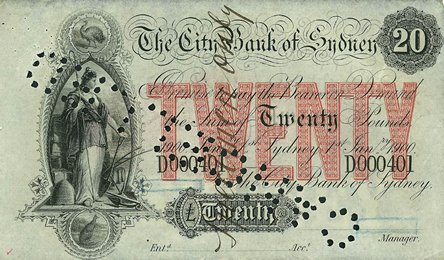
City Bank of Sydney in Australia cancelled £20 banknote

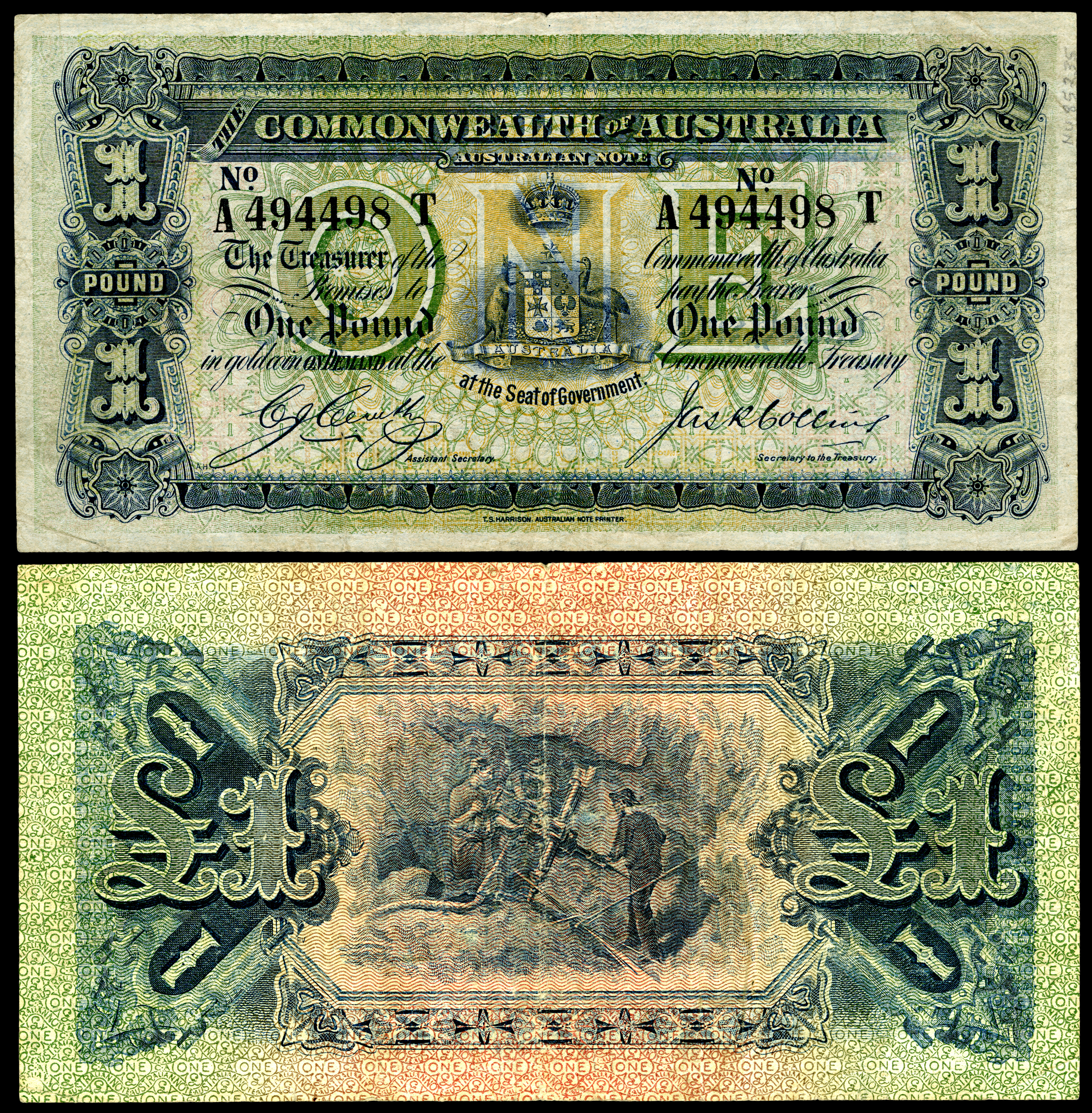
Commonwealth of Australia, One Pound (1918).

The Deakin government's Coinage Act 1909 distinguished between "British coin" and "Australian coin", giving both status as legal tender of equal value. The act gave the Treasurer the power to issue silver, bronze and nickel coins, with the dimensions, size, denominations, weight and fineness to be determined by proclamation of the Governor-General. The first coins were issued in 1910, produced by the Royal Mint in London.

In September 1910, the federal Labor Government of Prime Minister Andrew Fisher passed the Australian Notes Act banknotes denominated in the Australian pound. Like the pound sterling, the Australian pound was divided into 20 shillings and each shilling was divided into 12 pence, making a pound worth 240 pence. The Act also prohibited the circulation of all state notes and demonetised them, giving full control over the issue of Australian notes to the Commonwealth Treasury.

As a transitional measure lasting three years, blank note forms of 16 banks were supplied to the government in 1911 to be overprinted as redeemable in gold, and issued as the first Commonwealth notes. Some of these banknotes were overprinted by the Treasury, and were circulated as Australian banknotes until new designs were ready for Australia's first federal government-issued banknotes, which commenced in 1913.

Also passed in 1910 was the Bank Notes Tax Act 1910, which imposed a tax of 10% per annum on all bank notes issued or re-issued by any bank in the Commonwealth after the commencement of this act, and not redeemed: this tax made the production of private currency in Australia no longer viable, and effectively ended its use. The Bank Notes Tax Act was repealed by the Commonwealth Bank Act 1945, which formally prohibited producing private currencies, and imposed fines for doing so.

In 1920, the Nationalist Hughes ministry passed the Commonwealth Bank Act 1920 that repealed the Australian Notes Act, and transferred note issuing authority from the Treasury to the Commonwealth Bank. In 1960, responsibility for note printing passed to the Reserve Bank of Australia (RBA). The RBA has been producing Australia's polymer banknotes since 1988. Its note printing branch was corporatised in July 1998, as Note Printing Australia, which is a now a wholly owned subsidiary of the RBA.

Initially, the Australian pound was officially distinct in value from the British pound sterling, but Australia's monetary policy was for it to be fixed in value to the pound sterling at parity. As such, Australia was on the gold standard so long as Britain was. In 1914, the pound sterling was removed from the gold standard. Australia returned to the gold standard in 1925 in conjunction with the United Kingdom and South Africa. As in the case of the United Kingdom, there was no return to a gold specie standard, but rather the introduction of a gold bullion standard. This once again formally locked the Australian pound to parity with the pound sterling. The return to the gold standard in association with its parity to the pound sterling, suddenly increased the Australian pound's value (imposed by the nominal gold price) which unleashed crushing deflationary pressures. Both the initial 1914 inflation and the subsequent 1926 deflation had far-reaching economic effects throughout the British Empire, Australia and the world. In 1929, as an emergency measure during the Great Depression, Australia left the gold standard, resulting in a devaluation relative to sterling. Britain devalued the pound sterling against gold in 1931. A variety of pegs to sterling applied until December 1931, when the government set a rate of £A 1 equalling 16 shillings sterling.

During World War II, Japan produced currency notes, some denominated in the Australian pound, for use in Pacific countries intended for occupation. Since Australia was never occupied, the occupation currency was not used there, but it was used in the captured parts of the then-Australian territories of Papua and New Guinea.

In 1949, when the United Kingdom devalued the pound sterling against the US dollar, Australian Prime Minister and Treasurer Ben Chifley followed suit so the Australian pound would not become over-valued in sterling zone countries with which Australia did most of its external trade at the time. As the pound sterling went from US$4.03 to US$2.80, the Australian pound went from US$3.224 to US$2.24, a devaluation of 30%.

== Decimalisation ==
1964 ABC report describing the design of the soon to be introduced Australian decimal coins.

In February 1959 the Commonwealth Government appointed a Decimal Currency Committee to investigate the advantages and disadvantages of a decimal currency, and, if a decimal currency was favoured, the unit of account and denominations of subsidiary currency most appropriate for Australia, the method of introduction and the cost involved. The Committee presented its report in August 1960 and recommended the date of introduction of the new system to be the second Monday in February, 1963. In July 1961 the government confirmed its support of a decimal currency system, but considered it undesirable to make final decisions on the detailed arrangement that would be necessary to effect the change. On 7 April 1963 the government announced that a system of decimal currency was to be introduced into Australia at the earliest practicable date, and gave February 1966, as the tentative change-over date.

On 14 February 1966, the Australian pound was replaced by the Australian dollar with the conversion rate of £A 1 equalling A$2. The dollar comprises one hundred cents.

Under the implementation conversion rate, £A 1 was set as the equivalent of A$2. Thus, 10 shillings became A$1, and 1 shilling became 10 cents. The conversion rate was problematic for the pre-decimal penny since the shilling was divided into twelve pence.

Amounts less than a shilling were converted as follows:

| Pence | Accurate conversion | Actual conversion |
|---|---|---|
| 1/2d | 5/12c | 0.417c |
| 6 1/2d | 5 5/12c | 5c |
| 6d | 5c | 5c |
| 12d (1s) | 10c | 10c |

When pounds, shillings and pence (£sd) were to be replaced by decimal currency on 14 February 1966, many names for the new currency were suggested. In 1963, the then-Prime Minister of Australia, Robert Menzies, a monarchist, wished to name the currency the royal. Other proposed names from a public naming competition included more exotic suggestions such as the austral, the oz, the boomer, the roo, the kanga, the emu, the koala, the digger, the zac, the kwid, the dinkum, and the ming (Menzies' nickname). Menzies' influence resulted in the selection of the royal, and trial designs were prepared and printed by the Reserve Bank of Australia. Australian treasurer and future Prime Minister, Harold Holt, announced the decision in Parliament on 5 June 1963. The royal would be subdivided into 100 cents, but the existing names shilling, florin and crown would be retained for the 10-cent, 20-cent and 50-cent coins respectively. The name royal for the currency proved very unpopular, with Holt and his wife even receiving death threats. On 24 July Holt told the Cabinet the decision had been a "terrible mistake" and it would need to be revisited. On 18 September Holt advised Parliament that the name was to be the dollar, of 100 cents.

== Australian dollar ==
When Australia was part of the fixed-exchange sterling area, the exchange rate of the Australian dollar was fixed to the pound sterling at a rate of A$1 = 8 UK shillings (A$2.50 = UK£1). In 1967, Australia effectively left the sterling area, when the pound sterling was devalued against the US dollar and the Australian dollar did not follow. Instead, in 1971, Australia pegged the Australian dollar to the United States dollar at a rate of A$1 equalling US$1.12.

Since 1969, the Royal Australian Mint in Canberra has produced all Australian coins. Until 1970, the Melbourne and Perth mints operated under the jurisdiction of the Royal Mint, as had the Sydney Mint until it was closed in 1926.

On 12 December 1983, the newly elected Labor government, led by Prime Minister Bob Hawke and with Paul Keating as the Treasurer, moved the Australian dollar onto a floating exchange rate. Since the float, the Australian dollar has fluctuated from a low of 47.75 US cents in April 2001 to a high of US$1.10 in July 2011.

On 27 September 2012, the Reserve Bank of Australia stated that it had ordered work on a project to upgrade the current banknotes. The upgraded banknotes would incorporate a number of new future proof security features and include Braille dots for ease of use of the visually impaired. The first new banknotes (of the $5 denomination) were issued from 1 September 2016, and the other denominations were issued in following years.

== See also ==
- Australian pound
- Australian dollar
- History of pound sterling in Oceania

== Sources ==
- Pitt, Ian W., ed. (2000). Renniks Australian Coin and Banknote Values (10 ed.). Chippendale, New South Wales: Renniks Publications. ISBN 0-9585574-46.
- Pitt, Michael T., ed. (2013). Renniks Australian Coin and Banknote Values (25 ed.). Renniks Publications. ISBN 978-0-9873386-2-4.
