= Australian Federated Union of Locomotive Employees =

Railway worker union in Australia

- Australian Federated Union of Locomotive Employees
- Founded: February 1921
- Headquarters: 41 Peel Street; South Brisbane, Queensland; Australia
- Members: 1,716 (as at 31 December 2024)
- Key people: Anthony Woodward (President); Michael McKitrick (State Secretary)
- Website: afule.org.au

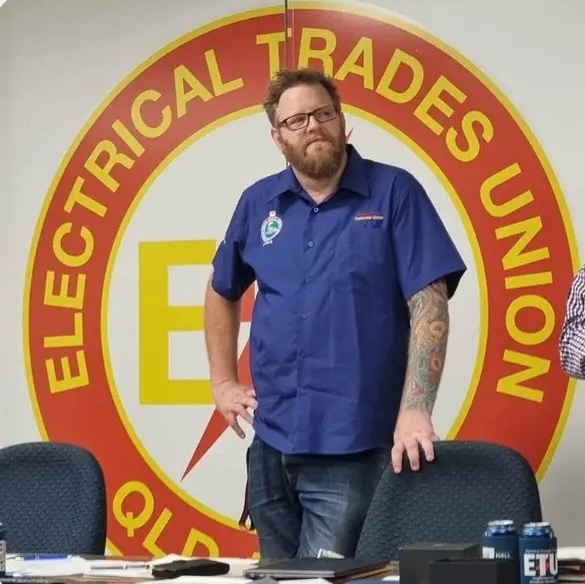
ETUQ AFULE State Secretary Mick McKitrick

The Australian Federated Union of Locomotive Employees (AFULE) is an Australian trade union representing railway workers. It was formerly a national union which largely merged into the Australian Rail Tram and Bus Industry Union in 1992; however, the Queensland division continued as a separate union active only in that state.

It was first registered in February 1921 as the Australian Federated Union of Locomotive Enginemen, representing an estimated 15,000 locomotive enginemen across Australia. Arthur Drakeford became the union's first federal secretary. The union had applied in September 1920, but had its registration delayed due to a legal dispute with the Federated Engine Drivers and Firemen's Association of Australasia.

The single national union replaced the Federated Railway Locomotive Enginemens’ Association of Australia, formed in 1899, which had linked state unions in Victoria, New South Wales, South Australia and Queensland without formally coming together as one federal union. They were the first union covering "state instrumentalities" to gain federal registration after the 1920 High Court of Australia ruling in Amalgamated Society of Engineers v Adelaide Steamship Co Ltd, which had given workers in those areas access to federal jurisdiction. It changed its name to the Australian Brotherhood of Locomotive Engineers in 1926, but reverted to its original name in 1927.

The national union merged with the Australian Tramway and Motor Omnibus Employees' Association, the National Union of Rail Workers of Australia and the Australian Railways Union in 1992 to form the Australian Rail Tram and Bus Industry Union. However, a 1993 court ruling held that the state-registered Queensland branch was a separate union and required a separate vote, which went against amalgamation. It continued on as a separate union registered only in Queensland, and subsequently gained federal registration in Queensland during the 2000s on the requirement that the union rules limited the union's operation to Queensland.

In 2017, the Queensland AFULE amalgamated with the Electrical Trades Union (ETU), to become the Electrical Trades Union of Employees Queensland (AFULE Division).
