= Ted Hill (Australian communist) =

Australian barrister and communist activist (1915–1988)

- Hill in 1955

Chairman of the Communist Party of Australia (Marxist–Leninist)
- In office 15 March 1964 – 1986
- Preceded by: position established

Personal details
- Born: Edward Fowler Hill; 23 April 1915 Mildura, Victoria, Australia
- Died: 1 February 1988 (aged 72) Victoria, Australia
- Party: CPA (M-L)
- Spouse: Joyce Hill
- Education: Essendon High School
- Profession: Lawyer, politician, activist

Edward Fowler Hill (23 April 1915 – 1 February 1988) was an Australian barrister, lawyer and communist activist. He was chairman of the Communist Party of Australia (CPA M-L) from 1964 to 1986.

== History ==
Hill was born on 23 April 1915 in Mildura, Victoria to James and Alice Hill. He attended school at Hamilton High School, where his father was head teacher. After leaving school he worked as a clerk for Bill Slater, a local barrister who was also the local Labor Member of Parliament. In 1933 he moved to Melbourne to study law at the University of Melbourne. Despite being awarded for his academic knowledge he did not finish his legal degree until 1981. It was during his time at the university that he joined the Communist Party of Australia (CPA).

He was admitted to practice as a barrister and solicitor in 1938 and soon became well known as the CPA's leading legal figure, defending the party and its members in several well-known trials. In 1951 he advised Frank Hardy in his prosecution for criminal libel over his novel Power Without Glory. Hill also represented the CPA before the 1949–1950 Royal Commission Inquiring into the Origins, Aims, Objects and Funds of the Communist Party in Victoria and Other Related Matters, and the 1954 Royal Commission into alleged Soviet espionage in Australia (see Petrov Affair).

=== Split ===
In the 1950s, Hill was Victorian State Secretary of the CPA. When the Sino-Soviet split developed in the early 1960s, Hill supported the position of the Chinese Communist Party, while the CPA majority, led by National Secretary Lance Sharkey supported the Soviet Union. Hill was expelled from the CPA in 1963 and in March 1964 formed the Communist Party of Australia (Marxist–Leninist) (CPA(ML)), taking many militant members from the Victorian CPA with him. Among ordinary Australian voters, the attraction of Hill's party was negligible.

Hill fully supported the "line" of the Chinese Communists until Mao Zedong's death in 1976, but after the 1972 change in Chinese policy away from world revolution and towards an alliance with the United States, the CPA(ML) lost many of its adherents, particularly among radical students. Hill traveled to Democratic Kampuchea and met with Pol Pot. In December 1976 he also met Hua Guofeng, who had become Chairman of the Chinese Communist Party shortly before. After the rise of Deng Xiaoping in China the CPA(ML) no longer supported Chinese policies, and became a supporter of "Australian independence." This led to a split in the CPA(ML) in 1978.

Despite his prominence as a Communist, Hill was able to pursue a long and distinguished legal career, as one of the best known and highly regarded workers compensation lawyers in Australia. He was widely praised by trade unions, judges and other lawyers, most of whom did not share his political views, on his death in 1988.

== Works ==
Hill wrote a number of books on Australia and Marxism, including Australia's Economic Crisis – The Way Out and Revolution and the Australian State. Some of Hill's writings can be found on the Encyclopedia of anti-Revisionism Online at the Marxists Internet Archive, and the official website of the CPA(ML).

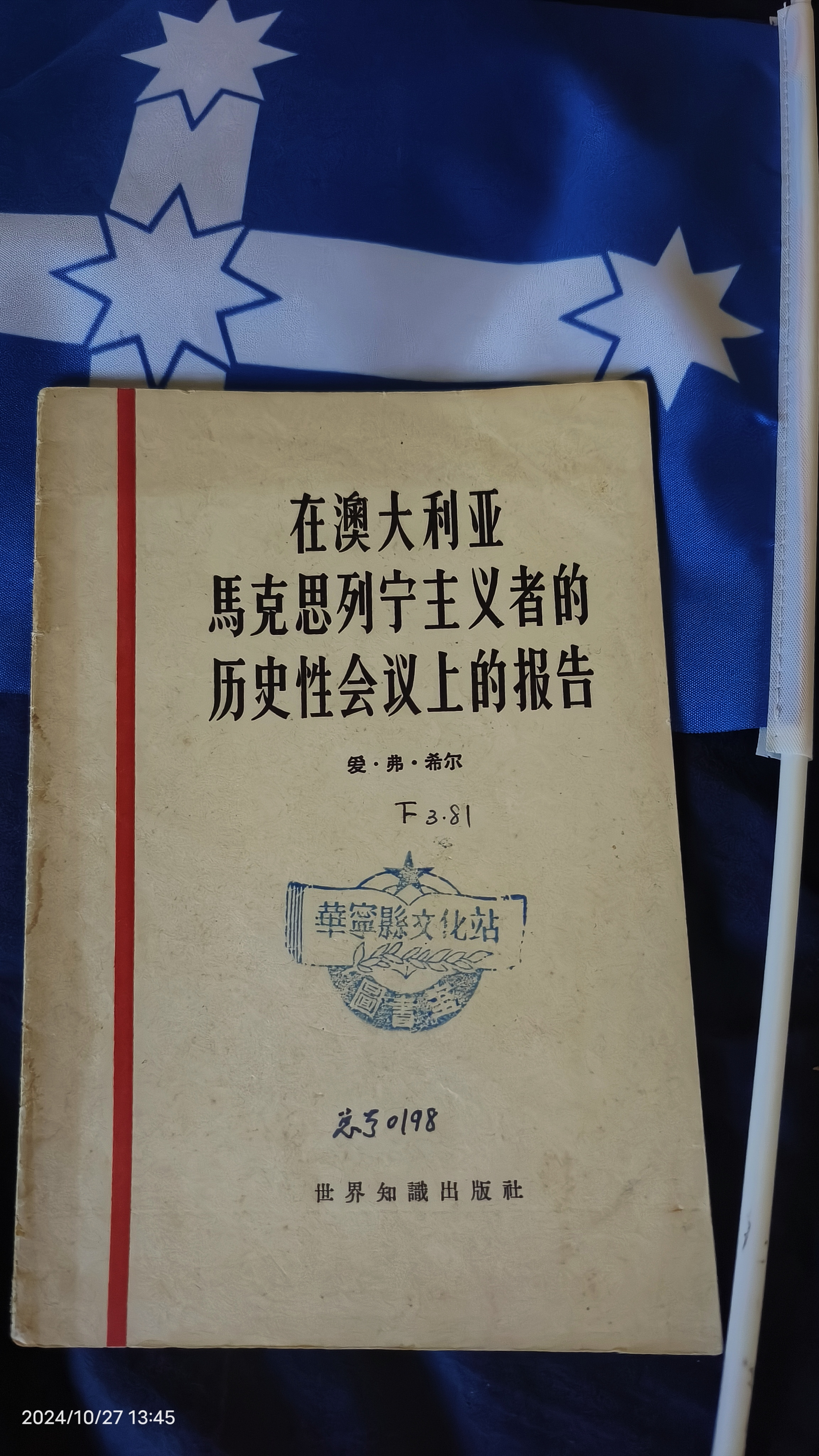
Hill's report published in People's Republic of China in 1965

== Influence ==
CPA(ML) describes its ideology as being influenced by the works of Karl Marx, Friedrich Engels, Vladimir Lenin, Joseph Stalin, Mao Zedong and Ted Hill.

== Official Website ==
www.efhill.com
