= Australian Railways Union =

Australian transport industry trade union

- Merged into: Public Transport Union
- Founded: 1920
- Dissolved: 1 March 1993
- Headquarters: 377 Sussex Street, Sydney
- Location: Australia
- Members: 50,000 (1976)
- Publication: The Railway Advocate
- Affiliations: ACTU, ALP

The Australian Railways Union (ARU) was an Australian trade union in existence from 1920 to 1993. The ARU was an industrial union, representing all types of workers employed in the rail industry, excluding locomotive enginedrivers and tradesmen in craft areas.

== History ==
It was formed in September 1920, through the amalgamation of state-based unions in Queensland, New South Wales, Victoria, South Australia, and Tasmania, and was federally registered as a union on 8 February 1921. In 1976, it supported the anti-nuclear movement by carrying out a national strike, which halted the transport of uranium. It merged with three other public transport unions in 1993 to form the Australian Rail Tram & Bus Industry Union.
