= Sam Byrne (painter) =

Australian painter (1883–1978)

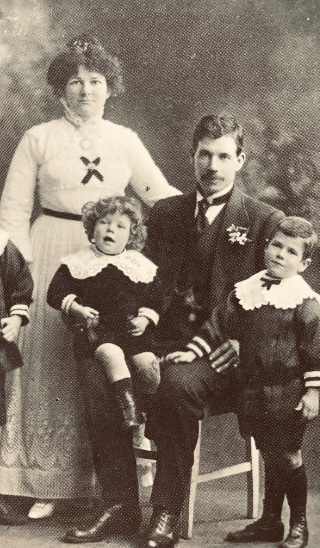
- Sam and Florence Byrne in 1915
- Born: Michael Eldrige Samuel; 10 July 1883; Humbug Scrub, South Australia
- Died: 24 February 1978 (aged 94); Broken Hill, New South Wales
- Resting place: Broken Hill Cemetery
- Occupations: Miner, Painter
- Years active: 1955-1978
- Known for: Painting the folk and industrial history of Broken Hill
- Spouse: Florence Curtis Byrne (m. 1910)

Signature
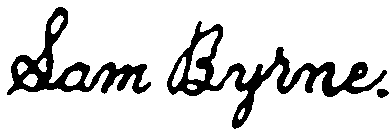

Samuel Byrne (1883–1978) was an Australian self-taught folk painter from Broken Hill, New South Wales. A former miner and unionist, he turned to painting in old age and became known for his depictions of civic life in his home town, working life on its mines, as well as events and historical anecdotes. His works are characterised by detail, vivid colours, and a narrative focus often imbued with humour. Byrne emerged from the fringes of an outback mining city and rose to prominence and recognition within Australia's national arts establishment. Despite a late start in life, Byrne managed to build a reputation as one of Australia's “most prolific” and “most celebrated” naïve artists. His works are held by state galleries and the National Gallery of Australia, and have been recognised by commentators as both examples of Australian self-taught art and as records of the mining and folk history of Broken Hill.

Leonard French, who discovered Byrne and spent some time trying to understand his motivations for painting, remarked that he had never met anyone of “such an absolute innocence”. Art historian Jenny Zimmer described Byrne as an “extroverted eccentric of a particular type, peculiar to Australia”. In his older years, Byrne was described by Broken Hill historian R. H. B. Kearns as lively and sharp-witted, with a "whimsical sense of humour" and a deep reserve of reminiscences - traits that informed both his public persona and his reputation as a "raconteur in paint".

== Biography ==
=== Early life ===
Sam Byrne was born Michael Eldrige Samuel on 10 July 1883 in Humbug Scrub, South Australia, the second child of James and Elizabeth Burns. His Irish-born father worked itinerantly across gold and silver rush sites, including Mount Browne in northwestern New South Wales and the Day Dream and Umberumberka silver mines in the Barrier District. When Byrne was two, the family moved to the mining town of Thackaringa, west of Broken Hill.

He attended primary school in Thackaringa before his father died in 1890 from a blacksmithing accident. With no widow’s pension available, his mother moved the family to Broken Hill to work as a washerwoman, but died soon after from pneumonia. Byrne was then raised by two aunts and attended school until he was old enough to work on the mines.

As a child, Byrne supplemented the family income by selling The Barrier Miner, collecting bottles, and claiming bounties for collecting rabbit carcasses during the great rabbit plagues of the Broken Hill district at the end of the 19th century. Byrne's memories and childhood fascination with the rabbit plagues, and the townsfolk's unusual methods of dealing with them, would become a recurring theme of his paintings later in life. (Note: In the 1890s, the Broken Hill Municipal Council wrongly attributed a typhoid outbreak to the proliferation of rabbit carcasses, and paid residents to collect them. Byrne painted the various ways the townsfolk dealt with the rabbits, including rounding them up into old mines, pushing them around in prams and wheelbarrows, and eventually cremating them in fires.)

=== Mining Career ===
Sam Byrne began working at the BHP lead-silver mine in Broken Hill at the young age of fifteen, using his deceased brother's union card to register. Initially a messenger boy, he soon undertook manual work underground such as rock breaking, timbering, and shovelling ore. The work exposed him to occupational risks such as dust disease, smoke, underground fires, lead poisoning and cave-ins, the latter of which caused the death of some of his colleagues.

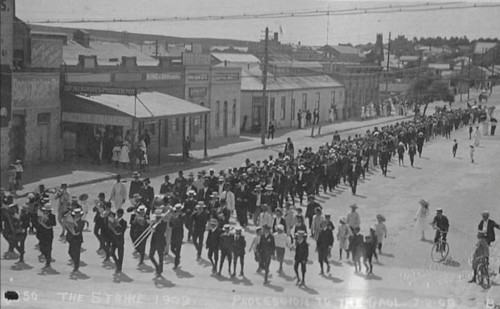
A strike procession during the 1909 Broken Hill Lockout. Sam Byrne played in the union brass band which marched the pickets to the mine boundary, where they would keep guard for strikebreakers.

Byrne described himself as a socialist, and was a unionist at a time when Broken Hill's mining unions were heavily engaged in advocating for improved mine safety. (Note: See Big Strike of 1919, and the Chapman Commission) The early mining conditions of Broken Hill, the plight of its miners, and the associated violent union strikes of 1892 and 1909 (Note: The 1909 Lockout was a 20 week dispute over the BHP Mine's cutting of wages. Mine manager G. D. Delprat obtained police reinforcements from State Premier Charles Wade, culminating in a violent riot and the arrest of union organiser Tom Mann.) would later surface as subjects in his paintings. They captured the attention of communist writer Leonard Fox, who interviewed Byrne for the mining union publication Common Cause, where Byrne reflected on the harsh conditions and criticised the mining companies' attitude that the lives of their workers were expendable. (Note: In several interviews, Byrne explained that mining companies considered the death of a pit pony far more significant than the death of a man. A dead man would simply be taken to the morgue, whereas a death of a horse would instigate an inquiry (Fox 1963) (Blackman & Lehmann 1977, p. 75).)

Before the First World War, Byrne suffered a severe arm injury in mining machinery, prompting him to retrain as a surface engine driver. He retired in 1949 at age 66.

=== Personal life ===
In 1908, on a trip to South Australia to work as a labourer on a salt pan, Sam Byrne courted his cousin Florence Pope. After exchanging letters over the coming years, she moved to Broken Hill and the couple married in 1910. They bought their first house in the suburb of Railway Town, next to Byrne's foster aunt's house. The house was destroyed by a fire in 1917. Over the next few years, the couple had four sons, one died in infancy.

Sam Byrne did not enlist to join the First World War due to his arm injury and domestic responsibilities. His youngest brother did enlist and was killed in the Gallipoli campaign. Likewise, he did not serve in the Second World War as mining was classed as a protected industry. Byrne's family were relatively insulated from the economic downturn of the Great Depression due to maintaining employment in his specialised trade as an engine driver. He secured scholarships to send his three sons to a teacher's college; adamant that they should avoid the dangerous work on the mines.

In his retirement, aside from painting, Byrne was an enthusiastic member of the Old Age Pensioners' Association, the Broken Hill Historical Society, and the Barrier Field Naturalists' Society. He was a keen fossicker and an amateur inventor. One of the more unusual inventions he worked on was a bicycle that could paddle on water, for which he dug out and flooded a large trench in his backyard. He did not drive a car, and relied upon a bicycle for transport throughout his life. He was known to be a reckless cyclist, continuing into his eighties when he had poor vision, and in 1938 appeared before a magistrate over traffic violations. Byrne attributed his exceptional longevity to the effect that interests, hobbies, and painting had in keeping his mind stimulated. His later life transformation from a miner to an artist has been cited by some as a model for a fulfilling retirement.

Byrne died on 24 February 1978 at Broken Hill Hospital, after a short illness. He was interred at Broken Hill Cemetery.

== Career as a painter ==
Byrne began painting in the early 1950s, inspired by sketches he had made of Broken Hill and its surrounds on excursions with the Barrier Field Naturalists' Society. He had no commercial aspirations, and explained that he only wanted something nice to hang on the walls at home. According to Betty Churcher, at first Byrne had “absolutely no interest in other artists, nor in any tradition in art”.

His first entry in a local art competition came on a joke with his brother. Nonetheless the judge commended the work, noting its originality but also its crude materials, which consisted of butcher’s paper and children’s paints. He then introduced Byrne to local artist May Harding, who encouraged him to pursue his distinctive self-taught style and assisted him in adopting professional materials and techniques.

I was very privileged being self-taught, and it gave me great satisfaction to accomplish something that would give me fame after a life of hard work in the mines.

— Sam Byrne

In 1960 Melbourne artist Leonard French awarded Byrne first prize in the annual Broken Hill Art Competition for his panorama The Silver City. Impressed, French offered to introduce him to Sydney gallery director Rudy Komon, though at first he wrestled with the ethical dilemma of whether to expose Byrne to the judgement of the commercial art world. With Byrne’s consent, this step soon led to exhibitions at Melbourne's Museum of Modern Art and Sydney's Rudy Komon Art Gallery and to his first major public acquisition Mt. Robe Highest Peak in the Barrier Ranges, purchased by Hal Missingham, director of the Art Gallery of New South Wales.

Through the 1960s Byrne held several solo exhibitions, though arthritis and fatigue later led him to give them up. He would make personal appearances at the openings, where he acted as an unofficial ambassador for his home city of Broken Hill, explaining with pride the folk stories behind his paintings.

He exhibited primarily through the Rudy Komon Gallery but also worked with other commercial galleries, (Note: Including Von Bertouch Galleries, Barry Stern Gallery, Bonython Gallery, South Yarra Gallery, Gallery A, Australian Galleries, Anvil Gallery, and Greenhill Galleries) and demand for his work grew steadily. His paintings entered institutional and corporate collections in Australia and overseas, and there were often personal commissions. (Note: Private collectors and clients included fashion entrepreneur Zara Bate, arts patron and writer Margaret Carnegie, Melbourne mayor and businessman Irvin Rockman, Ray Hughes, Harold E. Mertz, artist Pro Hart, and artist Paul Delprat, whose great-grandfather had managed the Broken Hill mine that Byrne worked on at the time of the 1909 Lockout.) A notable commission came in 1967, for Australian Prime Minister Harold Holt, the painting being presented to him shortly before his disappearance. Byrne also sold paintings directly from his Wolfram Street home, and his wife Florence proved to be a capable and shrewd sales manager. (Note: Australian swimming coach Harry Gallagher recalled visiting the Byrnes' home and observing that the couple seemed to raise their prices upon seeing that he drove a Mercedes-Benz.)

Byrne was a founding member of the Willyama Arts Society and contributed to local arts policy. In 1976 the mayor of Broken Hill formally recognised Byrne’s services to art in a ceremony and exhibition at the Civic Centre. Despite his friendship with Brushmen of the Bush members Pro Hart and Hugh Schultz, Byrne was never invited to join the group, a fact that limited his visibility among visiting tourists.

In his final years Byrne focussed mainly on his line of lode series, depicting Broken Hill’s central mining operations as he remembered it from his youth. With these works he won acquisitive prizes in Broken Hill (1976) and Swan Hill (1977). Another was a finalist in the Wynne Prize and was purchased by BHP for its Melbourne offices. His 1978 painting Broken Hill Line of Lode 1893 proved to be the final work he exhibited before his death. The series as a whole was described by biographer Ross Moore as an “epic vision” to immortalise Broken Hill at its prime, and translate his childhood experience of the industrial landscape into mythology.

== Technique, style, and subjects ==
The Silver City (1957). Sam Byrne's early panoramas are characterised by detailing.

Sam Byrne's preferred media was oils on Masonite, though his earliest works were in watercolour. In later life he integrated the media of gloss enamels and Dulux house paints, valuing their brilliance and sheen. His palette was strong and vibrant, dominated by bright reds, yellow ochres, and chalky blue skies filled with stylised clouds. Over the two decades he painted, his output can be divided into three stylistic phases, shaped by both his declining eyesight and his commercial activities.

=== Early panoramas (1950s–early 1960s) ===
Byrne’s earliest works were large panoramas of the Broken Hill township. Their style was cartographic, used traditional perspective and emphasised accuracy and detail. Distant houses and trees were rendered through a technique similar to pointillism, described by Geoffrey Lehmann as "miniaturisation" and likened to a colony of coral polyps. These cityscapes took several weeks to complete, and art critic Alan McCulloch noted the patience and craftsmanship they required.

=== Commercial phase (mid-1960s–mid 1970s) ===
Following his discovery by Leonard French and his first exhibitions, Byrne turned to subjects that reflected both his own memories of historical outback life and the demand from collectors and tourists. Mining scenes, dust storms, rabbit plagues, Sturt's desert peas, and union strikes became recurring themes. Animated scenes of historic civic life in Broken Hill were another hallmark, noted for their similarities to the works of British painter L. S. Lowry. Byrne would usually paint his “puppet-like” figures frontally to emphasise their reactions to events such as drunken brawls or police arrests.

The paintings of this period abandoned the perspective of his early panoramas in favour of a narrative emphasis. Byrne often used impasto, viewed by John Olsen as a stylistic choice, but which was also explained as the result of his tendency to overpaint until he was satisfied with the outcome. During this time, Byrne began to use textural collages of galena dust as a literal representation of the mineral in his mining scenes. He obtained the pulverised ore from friends who still worked on the Broken Hill mines, and sprinkled it into the wet paint.

During this commercial period, Byrne made and painted his own frames from salvaged wood, and attempted to imitate professional jobs. Although the resulting frames were crude, they have been described as artful constructions that complement to the paintings’ appeal as folk art.

=== Final years (mid-1970s–1978) ===
In Byrne’s final years his glaucoma brought changes in both technique and style. While he continued to produce the popular subjects buyers expected, the compositions became less controlled, with irregularities in form. Vertical lines were difficult to maintain, so figures often appeared to lean forward. He relied on the help of his neighbour Les Bell to distinguish and order his colours. Byrne’s focus in this period was the historic mining operations on Broken Hill’s Line of Lode. These works were described by biographer Ross Moore as having a "lyrical" quality, in their emphasis on the architectural forms of the mining industry.

== Artistic evaluation ==
Byrne has been classified variously by arts commentators as a naïve, a primitive, (Note: In her 1977 book Australian Naive Painters, art broker Bianca McCullough clarifies the distinction between "naïve" and "primitive" art, believing the latter term implies ethnic symbolism, and lacks the spontaneity and unselfconsciousness of the former.) a folk painter, and more recently as an outsider artist. The terminology and nuance has changed over time, but all reflect his lack of formal training and his origins outside of the mainstream art world. Byrne himself was aware of the terminology arts commentators used about him, but did not understand nor identify with them. He referred to himself simply as a self-taught artist. Commentators have commonly described the qualities of Byrne's paintings as "childlike" (Note: McCullogh (1977) wrote that the term "childlike" is problematic and confusing, and suggests it be replaced with "innocence".) and "simple", but have also highlighted their humour, honesty, and directness.

When Melbourne artist Leonard French awarded Byrne first prize in the 1960 Broken Hill Art Competition, the decision was controversial and met with resentment from local artists, who at the time viewed Byrne's self-taught style with amusement, scepticism, and questioned its value. Despite this, French’s advocacy helped bring Byrne to wider attention.

During his exhibiting years, Sam Byrne was profiled as a curious character in several general interest magazines and tabloids, none of which analysed his paintings in much detail. The publications nicknamed him “Grandpa Moses”, in reference to the American folk painter Grandma Moses. (Note: In an interview for the ABC Television program Spectrum, Byrne said he became aware of Grandma Moses through press coverage of his own exhibitions. Inspired, he wrote to the American painter on her 100th birthday, and described her reply letter as one of his most treasured possessions.)

More serious evaluation came during this period from Australia’s foremost art critics: James Gleeson saw Byrne as an “innocent of art,” with no artistic convictions beyond honesty and the desire to depict the world exactly as he saw it. He admired Byrne’s “confidence of ignorance” to overcome pictorial problems that would daunt trained realists, and described his style as idiosyncratic, comparable to that of European naïve painters such as Rousseau and Vivin – though he stressed that Byrne was on a “lower level of accomplishment”. Gleeson concluded that Byrne was not a good painter in terms of artistic impact, but that he would be highly appreciated in the field of folk art.

In a sign of recognition by the Australian arts establishment, in 1964 Byrne’s painting Lubra Mine as in 1886 appeared on the cover of Art and Australia. In the same publication, John Olsen praised Byrne’s exuberant use of colour, calling him a “junior Bruegel”. Olsen also remarked on his “unusual spatial abilities,” “strange perspectives,” and Byrne's practice of gluing pulverised ore onto his paintings a “bizarre urge for realism” that was surprisingly effective.

Elwyn Lynn praised the “refreshing and relaxed poetic sensibility” of Byrne's work. He observed his concern for authenticity, noting how he “painstakingly” dotted in every detail. Lynn assessed Byrne against prominent European naïve painters, comparing his aesthetic to that of Camille Bombois, but felt he was not quite at their level. The painting Rabbit Plague 1896 was highlighted as being fascinating from the perspective of pop art. Lynn also assessed the artistic link between Byrne and Grandma Moses, writing that Moses celebrated seasons and rural rituals, whilst Byrne commemorated specific historical events.

Several critics agreed that Byrne's most arresting paintings were his historical scenes of Broken Hill, and that his forays into depicting the modern world were inferior. By the middle of the 1970s, Byrne was painting a wide variety of subjects, including his recent holiday trips. These did not escape the scrutiny of some critics, with Nancy Borlase regarding them as "regrettably, the amateur paintings of a tourist".

Byrne's later works were affected by his glaucoma, which many collectors marked as a point of deterioration in his art. Sasha Grishin wrote that there was a decline in quality, while others describe their “abstracted” and “fluid” nature. Both author Geoffrey Lehmann and arts broadcaster Brian Adams described Byrne's compositions in this period as being crude in individual elements, but generating an overall effect of great energy. Although he ceased solo exhibitions in the late 1960s, Byrne remained a sought after commercial artist up until his death in 1978.

== Cultural and historical significance ==
Broken Hill Miners Tar and Feather Strike Breakers, 1892 Strike (1963). Some of Byrne's paintings may be the only remaining visual records of such union violence from the memories of an eyewitness. They have been likened to oral histories.

Most recognition of Sam Byrne’s paintings as records of Broken Hill's social and mining history has come posthumously. He was known for his vivid memories of the city's early years and participated in many published and broadcast oral history interviews. Although his paintings are not photographs of events, they have still been regarded as capturing the mood, memory, and attitudes of Broken Hill's early mine workers. In this sense, Byrne's works have been likened to oral histories in a visual form. For an oral history society journal, historian Jenny Zimmer wrote that Byrne “resurrects, pictorially, the stoicism and heroism of the underground miners”.

The attribution as historical records has been discussed with reference to Byrne's paintings of the 1909 Lock-out, the ensuing police violence against mine unionists, and the arrest of leader Tom Mann. Byrne witnessed the violence firsthand, and his experience is translated into scarce visual accounts of the event in his various strike paintings. (Note: Photographer Joseph Brokenshire also documented the 1909 Lockout but is not known to have photographed the riot itself.)

Byrne's paintings have been reproduced in several publications on Broken Hill's history, including those of the Broken Hill Historical Society, and the comprehensive The Richest Lode (1988). He was known to paint outsider townsfolk such as Muslim cameleers, rarely seen in visual arts documenting Broken Hill's history, and his paintings of these were used as supporting material in the South Australian Museum’s exhibition Australia’s Muslim Cameleers: Pioneers of the Inland (2007).

There has been institutional interest in Byrne’s paintings of rabbit plagues, a subject not often documented visually in Australian history. His work Hungry Rabbits Thackaringa 1890 was adapted into a panel for the Great Hall Embroidery (1988) which hangs at Parliament House, Canberra. Rabbit Plague Round-up into Old Mine featured in the National Gallery of Australia's centenary exhibition Federation: Australian Art and Society 1901–2001, which explored national identity through art. More recently, the State Library of New South Wales acquired Rabbit Plague Raking Up Rabbits Broken Hill 1893, in line with its mandate to preserve materials that document the history and culture of the state.

Historian and public intellectual Humphrey McQueen cited Sam Byrne's paintings as a model of how an authentic Australian arts culture can emerge from the grassroots of suburbia. He wrote that they offered a counterpoint to the Australian tendency to appropriate Aboriginal mythologies or to imitate overseas fashions.

Byrne biographer Ross Moore argued that Sam Byrne's artistic and historical contributions were not fully recognised by the people of Broken Hill during his lifetime. According to Moore, the city council repeatedly missed opportunities to acquire important works that documented the city's own heritage. (Note: As of 2025, the Broken Hill City Art Gallery is now home to Australia's largest public collection of Sam Byrne's works.) Byrne died disheartened that his final painting, Broken Hill Line of Lode 1893 (1977), had not been acquired by his city. His funeral was poorly attended, with no official representation from the council and no obituary in the local newspaper. In the state capital, the Sydney Morning Herald published a full obituary, lamenting that Byrne had died “unmourned by the very city he had helped build from the very bowels of the earth”.

== Arts literature ==
Byrne is included in the standard references McCulloch's Encyclopedia of Australian Art (2006), Australian Watercolour Painters (1989), and the World Encyclopedia of Naive Art (1984). He appeared in three ABC Television documentaries, and his works were discussed in the series Eye to Eye (1999) by former National Gallery of Australia director Betty Churcher. He was by profiled by Charles Blackman and Geoffrey Lehmann in Australian Primitive Painters (1977), as well as Sandra McGrath and John Olsen's The Artist and the Desert (1981).

The biography Sam Byrne: Folk Painter of the Silver City (1985) by fellow Broken Hill artist Ross Moore provided detailed biographical information and extensive oral histories. Moore presented a range of articulate personal interpretations, associating Byrne's work with other artists, genres and historical arts movements. The book was widely acknowledged as being an important reference source, though several critics disagreed with Moore's artistic interpretations and comparisons.

== Collections ==
Works by Sam Byrne are held in the permanent collections of: (Note: In a television interview, Byrne stated that he was represented overseas by the Phoenix Art Museum in Arizona, after the purchase of a painting from gallerist Kym Bonython. There are numerous reference books that repeat this information. However, the Phoenix Art Museum has no record of ever purchasing a Byrne painting, and what actually happened is unknown.(PC))

- National Gallery of Australia
- Art Gallery of New South Wales
- Art Gallery of South Australia
- State Library of New South Wales
- Queensland Art Gallery
- National Gallery of Victoria
- Australian Parliament House
- Heide Museum of Modern Art
- Newcastle Art Gallery
- Mildura Arts Centre
- Swan Hill Regional Art Gallery
- Broken Hill City Art Gallery
- La Trobe University
- Dunmoochin Foundation.

== Selected works ==
External links to selected works

- The Silver City (1957) Broken Hill City Art Gallery
- Thackaringa 1888 (1963) Swan Hill Regional Art Gallery
- Frog Marching Rioters 1909 Broken Hill (1963) Broken Hill City Art Gallery
- North Mine (c1963) Broken Hill City Art Gallery
- Arrest of Tom Mann 1909 Lockout Riot Broken Hill (c1965) Broken Hill City Art Gallery
- Fall of Ground Early Days Broken Hill (c1965) Broken Hill City Art Gallery
- Turks Fire on Picnic Train Broken Hill Jan 1st 1915 (1965) National Gallery of Victoria (Note: See Battle of Broken Hill.)
- Dust Storm Approaching Broken Hill (c1966) Heide Museum of Modern Art
- Prayer's and Curses Moslem's Pray Bullocky Curse's (sic)(c1969) National Gallery of Victoria
- Thackaringa 1890 (c1970) National Gallery of Australia
- Cecelia Resists Police – Unusual Transport Early Days Broken Hill (c1972) Broken Hill City Art Gallery (Note: Depicts Byrne's memory of the public spectacle of an arrest of Cecelia, a notorious character in the 1890s, often jailed for alcoholism. According to Byrne she was a brothel manager (Moore, p. 146).)
- BHP Mine and Viaduct 1890 (1976) Broken Hill City Art Gallery
