= List of strikes in Australia =

Throughout the history of Australia, there have been a number of strikes, labour disputes, student strikes, hunger strikes and other industrial actions.

== 19th century ==
=== 1880s ===
- 1886 Illawarra miners' strike

=== 1890s ===
- 1890 Australian maritime dispute
- 1891 Australian shearers' strike
- 1892 Broken Hill miners' strike, 16-week strike by miners in Broken Hill, New South Wales.

== 20th century ==
=== 1910s ===
- 1912 Brisbane general strike, general strike in Brisbane, Queensland, following the firing of workers for wearing union badges at work.
- 1917 Australian general strike
- Broken Hill mining strike, from 1919 to 1920 by miners in Broken Hill, New South Wales, over safety conditions.
- 1919 Fremantle Wharf riot

=== 1920s ===
- 1923 Victorian police strike, police strike in Melbourne, Victoria, over the use of labour spies.
- 1929 Australian timber workers' strike

=== 1930s ===
- 1938 Dalfram dispute, strike by dockworkers in Port Kembla, New South Wales, to prevent the export of pig iron to Japan during the Second Sino-Japanese War.

=== 1940s ===
- In 1941 workers carried out the first official hotel strike in Victoria by walking off the job at the Hotel Alexandra to demand an area for women workers to rest and change clothes.
- Strikes by dockworkers from 1945 to 1949 to prevent Dutch vessels from sailing to Indonesia during the Indonesian War of Independence, being nicknamed the Black Armada.
- Pilbara strike, from 1946 to 1949.
- 1946 Queensland meatworkers' strike
- 1948 Queensland railway strike, 9-week strike by railway workshop workers in Queensland.
- 1949 Australian coal strike

=== 1960s ===
- 1964 Mount Isa Mines strike, 8-month industrial dispute at the Mount Isa Mines, Queensland, over wages.
- Wave Hill walk-off
- A July 1967 strike by hotel staff in four states led to the adoption of equal pay for equal work for women in the industry.

=== 1970s ===
- 1971 strike by seven rugby players against playing in the Australian national team during the Apartheid-era tour by the all-white South African Springboks.
- 1973 ABC strike, strike by women script assistants at the Australian Broadcasting Corporation.
- 1973 Broadmeadows Ford strike, strike at the Broadmeadows Assembly Plant.
- 1973 ICI Botany strike, strike by Imperial Chemical Industries workers in Botany Bay.
- 1973 Kings Cross strippers' strike, strike by strippers in Sydney, New South Wales, over wages and working conditions.
- 1973 Melbourne gravediggers' strike, 12-day strike by cemetery workers in Melbourne.
- 1973 Mount Newman strike, 17-day strike by miners in Newman, Western Australia.
- 1973 Revlon strike, strike by Revlon cosmetics workers in Rydalmere, New South Wales, over changes in working conditions meant to speed up production.
- 1973 Sydney Airport strike, 5-week strike by communications workers at Sydney Airport.
- 1973 Sydney Philosophy strike, strike by University of Sydney Department of Philosophy students demanding the introduction of a women's studies course.
- 1973 Wee Waa strike, strike by Aboriginal cotton workers in Wee Waa, New South Wales.
- 1975 Melbourne printers' strike
- 1976 Warilla High School strike, 4-week strike by Warilla High School teachers.
- 1976 one day strike by Australian Railways Union members against the transportation of uranium.
- 1977 Australian air traffic controllers' strike
- 1977 Latrobe Valley power strike, strike by electrical workers in the Latrobe Valley.

=== 1980s ===
- 1981 Qantas strike, by Qantas staff.
- 1982 Queensland general strike, general strike in Queensland, demanding a 38-hour working week.
- Mudginberri dispute, from 1983 to 1985.
- Wide Comb dispute, in 1983.
- Dollar Sweets dispute, in 1985.
- SEQEB strike of Queensland, 1985

=== 1990s ===
- 1992 APPM Dispute, 3-week strike at an Associated Pulp and Paper mill in Burnie.
- 1994 Tomago aluminium strike, 24-day strike at the Tomago aluminium smelter over wages.
- Weipa Dispute, 6-week strike in 1995 at the Weipa bauxite mine, Queensland, over discrimination against unionised workers.
- 1997 Curragh miners' strike, 15-week strike by Curragh coal mine miners.

== 21st century ==
=== 2010s ===
- 2015 Australia women's national soccer team strike, 2-month strike by Australia women's national soccer team players over wages and working conditions.
- 2018 Alcoa strike, by Alcoa workers in Australia, the first in 8 years.

=== 2020s ===
- 2023 Chevron Australia strike - strike at the three liquefied natural gas facilities of the Chevron Corporation in Australia, representing around 5% of global LNG production.
- 2024 ASC strikes, by ASC Pty Ltd workers in Australia.
- 2026 Queensland rail strikes

== See also ==
- Australian labour movement
- Australian Council of Trade Unions
