= Florence May Harding =

Australian artist (1908–1971)

Florence May Harding (1908 – 19 August 1971), known as May Harding, was a teacher, naturalist, botanist, and artist (photographer, printmaker, draftsperson and cartoonist/illustrator) at Broken Hill, New South Wales.

Florence May Harding

== Family life ==
Born at the mining town of Silverton, New South Wales in 1908, May Harding was one of three children of Frederick Joseph Harding and Florence May Boyle, her siblings were Doris and Frederick The family soon moved to Broken Hill where her father followed the trade of a foundryman and moulder. Her family resided at 59 Williams Street, where after the early death of her mother in 1935 she cared for her father until his death in 1956, and then lived alone at that same home for the remainder of her life. Being without private wealth or income, she led a frugal existence. She never married.

== Public life ==
May Harding studied at the National Art School in Sydney, and with Douglas Robert Dundas (1900–1981), but in effect had no formal training in either botany or art. Early in life she developed a passion for the native flora of the arid West Darling region, collecting and identifying plants. Self-taught in botany she combined this attraction with art, as early as 1922 exhibiting paintings of wildflowers.

In the 1930s her interest in the native vegetation of the Broken Hill region was further spurred by the actions of Albert Morris, who was determined to control the city's dust problem. Morris was in 1918 the inaugural Secretary of the Barrier Field Naturalists' Club, a position subsequently held by May Harding, her membership spanning 45 years.

In this role she was adept as organiser, researcher, librarian, and speaker at Club meetings, as well as leading numerous field excursions, both within the district and further, such as the Flinders Ranges. In 1944 she was a member of The Sturt Memorial Committee of the Barrier Field Naturalists' Club, contributing botanical artwork and editorial material for their commemoration booklet, Sturt 1844 - 1944. In 1946 she was made an honorary member of the North Queensland Naturalists' Club. By 1950 she had Australia-wide botanical connections, recognising her expertise in the botany of arid and semi-arid lands.

== Art and botany ==
Between 1940 and 1970 she was the sole teacher (part-time) of art and botany at the Broken Hill Technical College, where from 1947 she also ran art classes for forty local children on Saturday mornings. As well as a fondness for children, she had a soft spot for cats, of which she always had a dozen or more lounging about her rumpled home amid her private library and favourite artworks, both hers and those of her artist devotees.

As a talented artist and graphic designer in oils and watercolours, she failed to attract critical acclaim in her own right, but from the early 1950s was instrumental in zealously promoting the art and artists of Broken Hill. In 1961 she was a foundation member, secretary, and treasurer (and sole female committee member) of the Willyama Art Society that stimulated the career of local artists such as Pro Hart and Sam Byrne, leading to the famous Brushmen of the Bush. Byrne, who was well aware of the debt he owed her, freely acknowledged her sound advice. In 1965 she was selected to open the Festival of Australian Wildflowers in Canberra. She was an Honorary Life Member of the Arts Council of Australia (NSW Division).

== Legacies ==
Harding was a well-known figure in Broken Hill art circles of the mid-20th century. She has been credited as foundational to the Broken Hill art culture of today.

May Harding died from breast cancer at Broken Hill on 19 August 1971 and is interred in the Broken Hill Cemetery. A section of the Broken Hill Regional Art Gallery was named in her honour and a Field Naturalists' flower show was dedicated to her following her death in 1971. A street in Broken Hill is named May Harding Drive after her. She is recorded at Design and Art Australia Online, and on The Australian Women’s Register.
