= Sam Byrne =

Sam Byrne may refer to:

- Sam Byrne (footballer) (born 1995), Irish professional footballer
- Sam Byrne (painter) (1883–1978), Australian naïve painter and folk historian
