= 2026 Queensland rail strikes =

Strike action by rail workers in Queensland, Australia

- A New Generation Rollingstock on the Varsity Lakes line arriving at Helensvale railway station in June 2026
- Date: 31 March 2026 – present
- Location: Queensland; Australia
- Caused by: Re-negotiation of lapsed Enterprise bargaining agreements
- Goals: Above-inflation wage increases
- Methods: Rolling strikes (reduced train services)
- Status: Partially resolved

Parties
RTBU; ETU (AFULE); TSU; AMWU; CFMEU; PPTEU; APESMA	Queensland Rail; Queensland government

Lead figures
Stef Whyte; Peter Allen; Rohan Webb; Michael McKitrick; Earl Setches; Rebecca Girard	David Crisafulli; Brent Mickelberg; Jarrod Bleijie; Nev Conway; Kat Stapleton

Number
7,000	

The 2026 Queensland Rail strikes are a series of protected industrial actions against Queensland government-owned corporation Queensland Rail by seven individual trade unions. As of September 2026, several unions had made in-principle agreements with the government to cease industrial action, however agreements with the Australian Manufacturing Workers Union (AMWU) and Electrical Trades Union (ETU) had yet to be reached.

== Background ==
Queensland Rail (QR) is a Queensland government owned statutory authority that operations passenger and freight rail services throughout the state. As of 2025, QR held $12.5 billion in assets and had a total workforce of over 8,000. Over 58 million customer trips were taken on the South East Queensland rail network in 2025–26 alone.

Employees are represented by seven registered trade unions, who often refer to themselves during negotiations and campaigns as the Combined Rail Unions. The unions include the Rail, Tram, and Bus Union (RTBU), the Australian Federated Union of Locomotive Employees (AFULE, now a division of the Electrical Trades Union of Australia, The Services Union (TSU), the Australian Manufacturing Workers' Union (AMWU), the Construction, Forestry and Maritime Employees Union (CFMEU), the Plumbing Trades Employees Union (PPTEU) and Professionals Australia (APESMA).

6 of the 7 enterprise bargaining agreements governing QR employees expired at the end of February 2026, and the Combined Rail Unions entered negotiations for new agreements with QR early in January.

== Timeline ==
- 28 February 2026 – Six Queensland Rail enterprise bargaining agreements expire, having been negotiated in 2023 and officially certified in January 2024. The seven Combined Rail Unions began talks with QR in January 2026 on the terms of a renewed agreement. Nev Conway acted as the chief spokesperson for QR during negotiations as the Head of Corporate Affairs.
- 31 March 2026 – The RTBU announced train controllers intended to take "low impact" industrial action affecting the running of coal and mineral trains, but not passenger services, for 24 hours. QR had advanced notice of the protected action, but chose not to advise commuters. The RTBU accused QR of "throwing the network into chaos" by stopping the running of passenger services against the wishes of the union. CEO Kat Stapleton advised QR's position in a statement, saying "when we have people working we want them to do their full job, and not be selective as to who they're going to let through or not."
- 1 April 2026 – 180 passenger rail services across South East Queensland were cancelled by QR, with CEO Kat Stapleton stating: "we urge the unions to continue negotiating with us in good faith, to stop this protected industrial action and to reconsider this offer" and denying claims that union members had been locked out of work as punishment for taking action. Passengers expressed significant frustration at the disruption, with several stations closed due to a lack of services and an estimated 20,000 commuters impacted. The RTBU's Stef Whyte said the union's demand was for Queensland Rail to "come back to the table and negotiate with us" and said workers were calling for "a fair wage increase" as well as improvements to safety and wellbeing. QR had offered a 2.63% wage increase per year for four years.
- 28 April 2026 – The RTBU announced they would be engaging in rolling strikes for the next 2 weeks after negotiations with QR the previous day at the Fair Work Commission had failed, due to QR presenting an offer too similar to one that was already refused. RTBU Queensland branch secretary Peter Allen advised the media that the rolling strikes were planned to affect maintenance workers and train signallers: "We will not stop trains — this will be measured and deliberate. If the network is disrupted, that will be Queensland Rail's choice, just as it was at Easter."
- 1 May 2026 – Queensland Transport Minister Brent Mickelberg announced a major change in passenger train timetables, saying temporary timetable would mirror weekend-style operations, with fewer trains running and significant gaps between services across the network. QR's Kat Stapleton said with members of the Electrical Trades Union and the Australian Manufacturing Workers’ Union refusing to conduct maintenance on trains, it meant there were not enough trains available to operate a normal timetable.
- 5 May 2026 – Queensland Rail and the RTBU were called into mediation at the Fair Work Commission to continue negotiation in the hopes of ending the rolling strikes. Speaking to the media, RTBU state secretary Peter Allen accused QR of “inflaming” the situation and turning “low level” strike action into an issue that would directly affect commuters by engaging in lock-outs (refusing to let staff who may wish to engage in protected industrial action from attending work at all). QR's Nev Conway stated that by 5 April, 20 percent of the state's train fleet was non operational due to the unions' refusal to carry out maintenance work. Approximately 273 train serviced had been cut by QR at this point, however approximately 80% of the SEQ network's services had been maintained.
- 1 July 2026 – Following "intensive" enterprise bargaining between the Combined Rail unions and QR since May, in-principle agreements had been reached on 3 of the 6 enterprise bargaining agreements. The Administrative, Professional and Technical (ASPT) Enterprise Agreement; the Travel and Tourism and Other Employees Enterprise Agreement; and the Station Operations Enterprise Agreement had been tentatively finalised. Agreed conditions included a wage increase of 8 percent over 3 years, plus an additional (but separately itemised) "cost of living" payment of up to 2.5 percent over 3 years. The agreements covered almost 3,500 QR employees, however agreements with the RTBU and AMWU were still to be reached, and rolling strikes continued.
- 14 August 2026 – QR announced they would soon be restoring some weekday services, and they were close to reaching an agreement with the RTBU in respect to the train controllers. The RTBU claimed the maintenance backlog was partially completed as their members had restarted maintenance work months before, again accusing the government of inconveniencing commuters without proper cause and engaging in lock-out action. RTBU secretary Peter Allen said the restored services were “something that could have been done some time ago” and he was hopeful the industrial dispute could be settled as soon as the following week. “The RTBU paused all industrial action in maintenance some months ago as we worked hard to land a deal and to keep the trains running,” Allen said.
- 18 August 2026 – An in-principle agreement with the unions representing train controllers (under the Train Control Enterprise Agreement) was reached, with 135 weekly services immediately restored by QR. The RTBU and TSU ceased rolling strikes, with TSU deputy secretary Rebecca Girard claiming it was a win for union members as the Combined Rail Unions "secured the existing conditions that have applied for those employees after many years of negotiations, and have also been able to secure some wins." The replacement in-principle agreement included an 8.5 percent wage increase over three years and a "strategic delivery allowance," described as an "added incentive to deliver major projects."

== Enterprise agreements ==
- Queensland Rail Train Control Enterprise Agreement 2023
- Queensland Rail Rollingstock and Operations Enterprise Agreement 2023
- Queensland Rail Station Operations Enterprise Agreement 2023
- Queensland Rail Administrative, Professional and Technical Enterprise Agreement 2023
- Queensland Rail Travel and Tourism and Other Employees Enterprise Agreement 2023
- Queensland Rail Network Enterprise Agreement 2023

== See also ==
- List of strikes in Australia
- Australian labour movement
- 1948 Queensland railway strike
