= Jack Absalom =

Australian artist (1927–2019)

- Born: John Henry Absalom; 11 November 1927; Port Augusta, South Australia
- Died: 22 March 2019 (aged 91); Broken Hill, New South Wales, Australia
- Known for: Artist; author; TV personality
- Awards: OAM

John Henry Absalom OAM (11 November 1927 – 22 March 2019) was an Australian artist, author and adventurer.

== Life and death ==
Born in Port Augusta, South Australia, Absalom grew up along the Nullarbor Plain, west of Port Augusta, and from an early age developed a wide knowledge of the outback from Aboriginal Australians who existed in tribes at that time. In 1949 he moved to Broken Hill, New South Wales, where he lived and worked until his death in 2019.

In 1972, he made a trip to the Flinders Ranges with a group of artists. Although he had never painted before, he felt a great urge to paint the landscape and a natural talent was discovered. In 1973, Jack was invited to exhibit his paintings at an art show in Sydney together with fellow Broken Hill artist Eric Minchin. The successful art show led to the formation of The Brushmen of the Bush – a group of five artists who exhibited for many years in Australia and all over the world raising money for charity. In April 1997, he opened his new gallery in Broken Hill which showcased his oil paintings, prints, publications, DVDs and his extensive opal collection.

Appalled by the unpreparedness of people travelling to the outback, Jack wrote the first bush survival guide for the Australian outback, called Safe Outback Travel He also starred in a number of television series produced by the Australian Broadcasting Corporation (ABC) covering survival techniques and documentaries on the Australian outback, including Absalom's Outback, when he travelled to remote outback locations in a Chrysler Sigma.

Absalom was the recipient of various awards, including "Australian Achiever of the Year Award" 1988 and the "Advance Australia Award" in 1995, both acknowledging his contribution to art; "Broken Hill Citizenship Award" for his promotion of Broken Hill; and Medal of the Order of Australia (OAM) in 2006 for service to the visual arts as a painter and to the community through fundraising for a range of charitable organisations.

Jack Absalom died in Broken Hill on 22 March 2019 at the age of 91.

== Works ==
- Absalom's outback paintings, 1983, ISBN 978-0-86788-005-2
- Safe Outback Travel, 1988, ISBN 978-0-86788-028-1
- Jack Absalom's Barbecue Cookbook, 1990, ISBN 978-0-86788-184-4
- Absalom: Paintings 1972-1996, 1996, ISBN 978-0-646-28427-9
- Outback Cooking in the Camp Oven, 1997, ISBN 978-0-86788-281-0
- Jack Absalom's Gallery, 2003, ISBN 978-0-646-42961-8
- Jack Absalom's Outback Journeys, DVDs
