= Chapman Commission =

1919–1921 medical inquiry in Australia

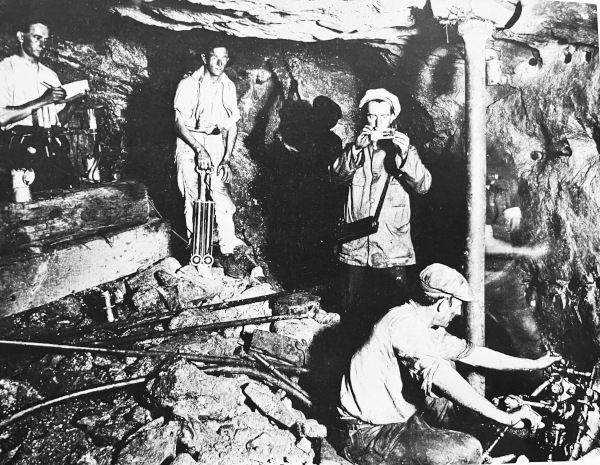
Testing for dust and lead concentrations for the Technical Commission of Inquiry 1920

The Chapman Commission or the Technical Commission of Inquiry into the Prevalence of Miners' Phthisis and Pneumoconiosis in the Metalliferous Mines at Broken Hill was an extensive government medical inquiry that took place between 1919 and 1921. The inquiry established the cause and extent of the industrial disease pneumoconiosis among miners in the city of Broken Hill, New South Wales, Australia. It found abundant evidence of the disease and in doing so disproved an earlier royal commission which had concluded it was not present. The prevalence of lead poisoning was also investigated.

The Commission played an important role in ending the Big Strike and the introduction of safety and occupational reforms to the mines. As a result of the inquiry various acts of parliament were introduced to provide, for the first time, compensation for those suffering from dust disease.

== Background ==
The outback mining city of Broken Hill was founded in 1883 on what was the world's largest discovered silver-lead-zinc mineral deposit. Lead poisoning was prevalent in the early days of city. It affected not only miners working with the lead ore, but also residents as dozens of smelter stacks emitted plumes of leaded smoke over the city and its water sources. The 1890s saw a board of inquiry which resulted in the passage of the Lead Poisoning Act. By 1898 the incidence of lead poisoning had been significantly reduced due to the safety reforms and the relocation of smelters to Port Pirie, South Australia. By the 1900s few miners were still working in the dangerous bioavailable oxidised lead ores and had moved to the deeper layer of sulphide ores which were less readily absorbed by the human body.

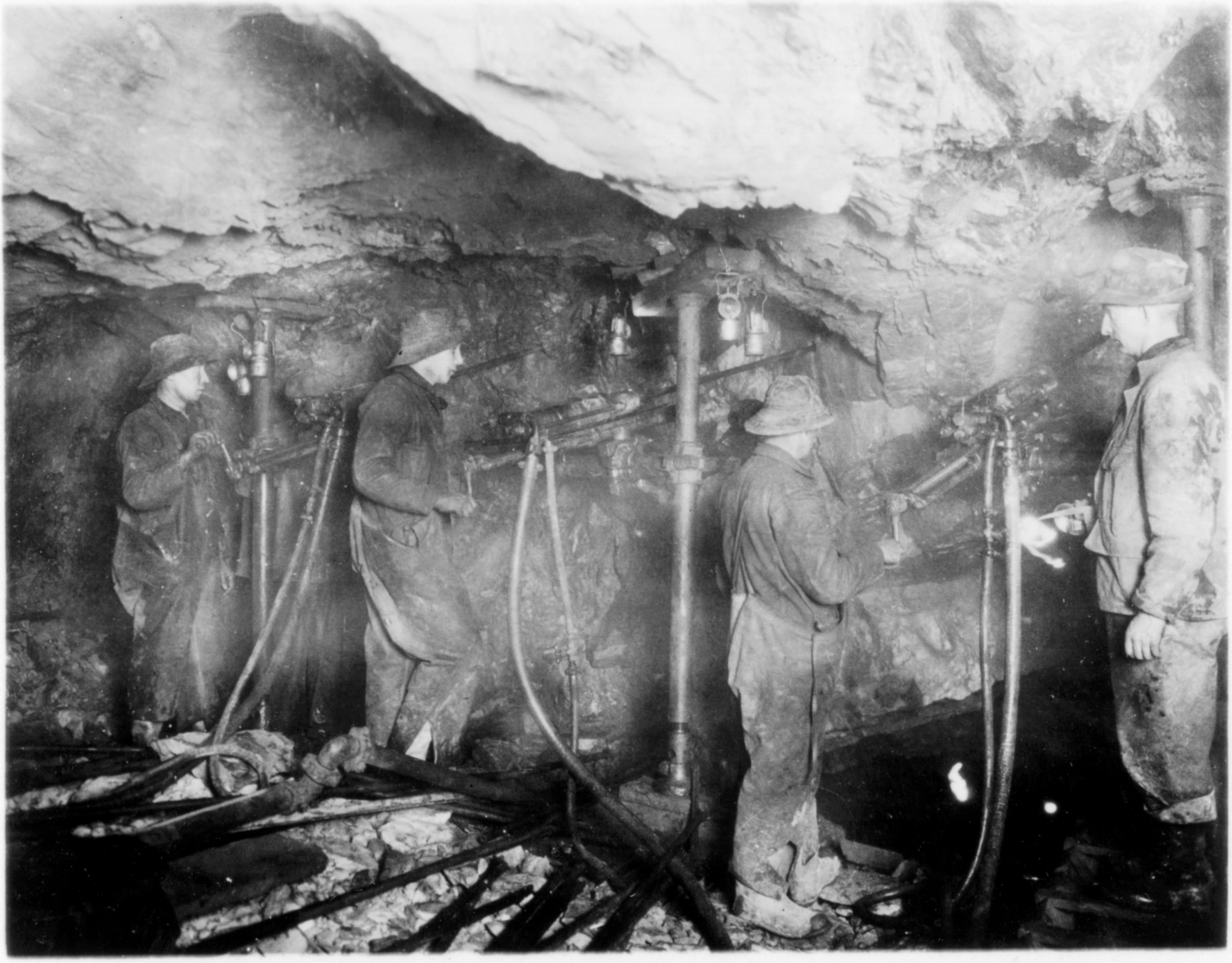
Underground drilling

Early methods of mining in the city were conducive to dust formation and thus dust inhalation by mine workers. With this came the risk of developing pneumoconiosis, a fibrosis of the lung tissue leading to reduced lung function and vulnerability to secondary infections such as tuberculosis and pneumonia. During the period from May 1917 to June 1920 there were 215 deaths of Broken Hill miners from pulmonary diseases. (Note: Excluding pneumonia.) Underground drilling and explosives contributed to the situation. The introduction of pneumatic drills in the early 1900s magnified the dust problem. Ventilation was rudimentary and there was little adequate damping down of bore holes with water. The latter was a condition of the 1901 Mines Inspection Act, however it was not being effectively implemented at Broken Hill, which suffered from a scarcity of water.

== Results of Previous Inquiries ==
A previous Royal Commission into mine safety carried out in 1914 had determined pneumoconiosis was 'practically unknown' in Broken Hill. The Wise Commission found widespread pneumonia and pulmonary tuberculosis among miners but did not identify these as being secondary infections to lungs already weakened by the pneumoconiosis. There was a belief that Broken Hill's sulphide ore was comparatively innocuous due to its softness and low silica content and so the mining companies cast doubt on whether it caused pneumoconiosis at all. If it did exist, the companies claimed the disease was contracted in other quartz-rich mining sites and imported by itinerant labour to Broken Hill. Local doctors were also not able to properly identify pneumoconiosis before x-ray technology was introduced to Broken Hill around 1916. Additionally, patients suffering from the early stages of the condition rarely complained of ill health. It was only when the fibrosis was supervened by tuberculosis or pneumonia that a sick man would present to the hospital, often elsewhere many years later. The tendency of Broken Hill's miners to exodus to other population centres further masked the incidence of the disease being identified locally.

== Appointment of Commission ==
By the mid-1910s, Broken Hill's miners' unions had become very concerned about the underground working conditions and had long lobbied for pneumoconiosis and miners' tuberculosis to be compensable diseases. There had by this time been considerable medical studies, safety and compensation reforms on the diseases in the gold mines in South Africa. In 1916 the New South Wales Parliament passed the Workmen's Compensation Act which extended coverage for a number of occupational diseases, however miners' respiratory diseases were omitted from the legislation.

In 1918 Broken Hill's unions lobbied the Holman Government for a full investigation into the extent of industrial diseases on the mines, and to legislate compensation reforms. The Amalgamated Miners' Association had conducted their own medical investigations, claiming at least 160 miners were suffering from ill health. In June 1918 Minister for Labour and Industry George Beeby bowed to pressure and directed the New South Wales Board of Trade to investigate pneumoconiosis affecting, among others, metalliferous miners in the state, and whether the disease should be included in the Workmen's Compensation Act. It was decided that a technical commission needed to be set up specifically to investigate the situation in Broken Hill. By the Board's second interim report the constitution, personnel and costings of the proposed commission were outlined.

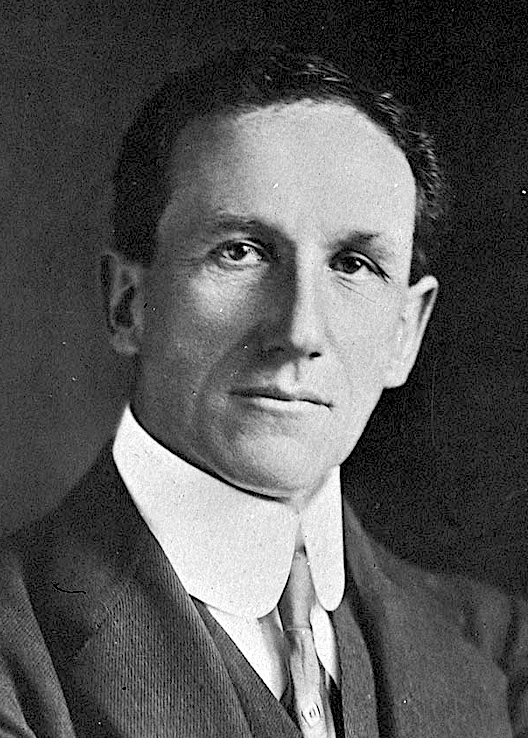
New South Wales Premier William Holman

In May 1919 Broken Hill's mines closed down due to the Big Strike. At the centre of the strikers' log of claims was the belief that working conditions underground were unsafe and detrimental to human health. Demands were made for a reduced working week, safer work conditions and compensation for occupational respiratory diseases. The strike dragged on as the mining companies refused to countenance the health claims the unions made. However, both the mining companies and the unions were in unusual agreement that the conflict could only be resolved through the proposed Technical Commission conducting its investigation to establish the exact extent of the health problems.

In December 1919 and six months into the strike, the pressure from both parties spurred the State Government to act on the recommendation. Henry Chapman, a professor of pharmacology at the University of Sydney, was appointed as commissioner to oversee the proposed Technical Commission. Chapman had an interest in the social value of medicine and had previously served as a medical expert on various boards of inquiry and conciliation committees dealing with compensation.

Chapman left for Broken Hill in December 1919 and began public consultations. The commission board was set up and consisted of union representatives, mine managers as well as government scientists and medical officials. The mining companies agreed to finance half the costs of the commission, and several years earlier had furnished the hospital with the X-ray apparatus needed for the investigation. By expressing his support for the unions, in particular the Amalgamated Miners' Association, Henry Chapman gained the trust of the miners to submit themselves to medical examination. At a time when mining-related respiratory diseases were not compensable, the commissioner gave his word to treat the diagnoses of individuals with confidentiality.

== Medical Findings ==
By the end of its investigations in 1921, the commission had examined 6,538 workers from various Broken Hill mines, of which 2,618 were classified as practical miners - engaged in drilling and blasting underground. From each participant a complete occupational history was recorded, including length of time engaged as a practical miner and whether he had worked at other mines outside of Broken Hill. The tests consisted of medical as well as radiographic examinations of the chest, and were supplemented by chemical and bacteriological tests. (Note: These examinations doubled as fitness for work certificates for the purpose of the Workmen’s Compensation (Broken Hill) Act after it was legislated during the investigation.)

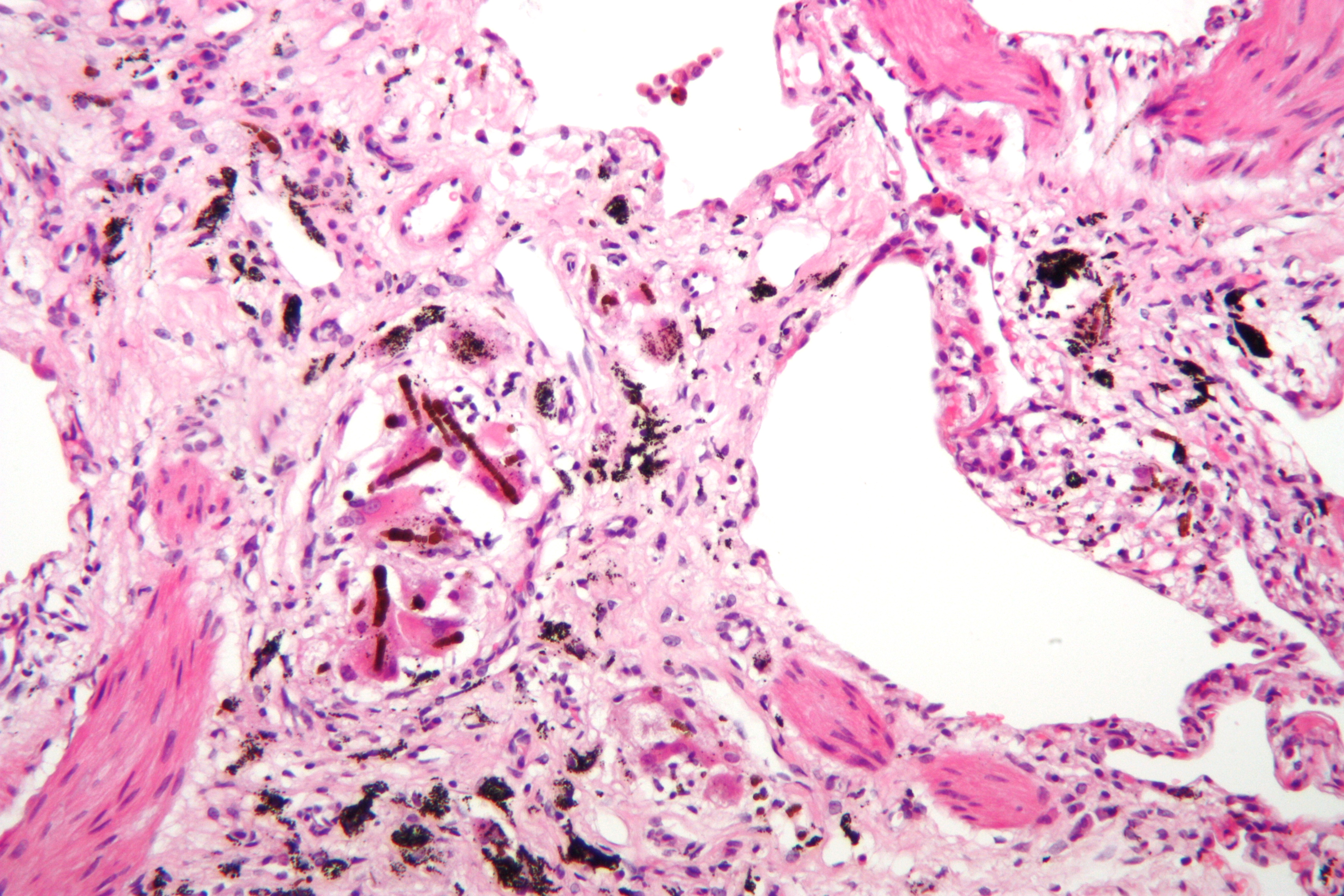
Histology stain of lung tissue showing a variety of pneumoconiosis.

All up 266 men were found to have pneumoconiosis, of these 38% had the condition supervened by pulmonary tuberculosis. Of the cohort, almost all were those engaged as practical miners, and a third had worked exclusively at Broken Hill mines. Furthermore, there was a high correlation between incidence of pneumoconiosis and the length of time spent working as practical miners. No men who had worked for less than eight years were afflicted. During the timespan of the investigation, many of the pneumoconiosis affected men developed tuberculosis, and of these several died. It was found that tuberculosis complicated with pneumoconiosis was more rapidly fatal than uncomplicated tuberculosis.

Chemical analysis of the urine of a random sample of several hundred miners detected in every case the presence of the heavy metal lead, and concluded the Broken Hill miners are without doubt exposed to the action of lead circulating in the blood. However, only 61 men were found to be suffering from the symptoms of lead poisoning at the time of examination. There was a correlation between incidence of lead poisoning and length of time working on mines, and the disease was more prevalent among underground workers.

The Commission analysed samples of lung tissue of deceased miners who had worked for years on Broken Hill's mines. The presence of lead, manganese and silica in the tissue was consistent with the local ore body and established that dust from the mines was present in the lungs. The commission therefore concluded that pneumoconiosis and lead poisoning arises in Broken Hill miners as a result of the inhalation of dust.

The Broken Hill ore body contains very little free silica and the Commission found that Broken Hill pneumoconiosis differed from silicosis caused by the inhalation of more siliceous dust in mines elsewhere in Australia. It was found possible to distinguish, by means of X-ray, pneumoconiosis arising in Broken Hill from silicosis present in those who had also worked elsewhere in quartz-rich mines as well as in Broken Hill. The Broken Hill variety of pneumoconiosis was characterised by fibrous tissue along the main respiratory passages and the appearance of hard spherical nodules on the surface of the lungs, with less involvement of the parts of the lungs involved in respiratory exchange. Those afflicted by Broken Hill pneumoconiosis were found to show less shortness of breath than what usually accompanies silicosis, suggesting that the disease progresses slowly with no impairment of working capacity until supervened by tuberculosis.

== Commission's Recommendations ==
The Commission recommended that workers suffering from pulmonary tuberculosis should not be allowed to work in the mines due to the risk of transmission and their impairment of health. Recognising that tuberculosis was a terminal condition, the commission was of the opinion that compensation should be given to those afflicted. Those affected by lead poisoning were also recommended to be removed from the industry, and compensation be given.

With regards to pneumoconiosis, the commission was of the opinion that those found to have the disease should not be allowed to continue working on Broken Hill's mines – neither on the surface nor underground. It recommended such persons be removed to open air in the form of a new pastoral or agricultural occupation. This would increase life expectancy by reducing the risk of contracting tuberculosis from others. It was recommended a scheme be set up to help the affected men find alternative employment. Furthermore, those individuals affected with pneumoconiosis should be kept under medical observation and, should they contract tuberculosis, be compensated.

It was recommended that in the future all persons seeking employment upon the mines should be put through a medical exam including an x-ray photograph of their lungs. Furthermore, mine workers should be monitored from time to time for the purpose of determining those affected by pneumoconiosis. It was recommended Broken Hill set up a purpose-built laboratory for carrying out these investigations.

For specific measures to reduce dust, the Commission concluded that dust could be reduced to a level insufficient to give rise to pneumoconiosis if several precautions were taken. Namely, explosives should take place only at the end of shifts and thirty minutes should elapse before work begins. A water blast should be used after firing explosives, and a jet of water should be directed at all boring work.

== Legislative Changes ==
The claims that they are making are not claims for great amounts of money per day; they are claims... to stay in God's sunshine long enough to throw off the evil effects of the poisonous gases associated with underground work.

— Percy Brookfield, speaking in 1920

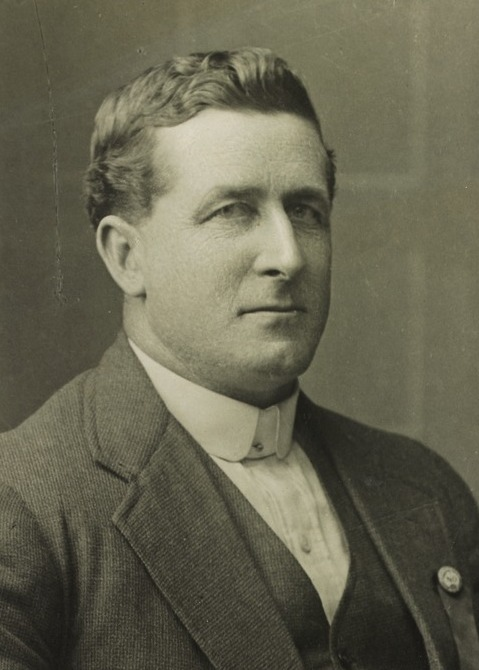
Percy Brookfield

The Technical Commission published its interim report in July 1920 and caught the mining companies off guard with its revelations of locally acquired pneumoconiosis. Several months earlier, Percy Brookfield had been elected to the seat of Sturt, this time as a candidate for the militant Industrial Labor Party, with a platform centred around the health and safety of mine workers. With a house evenly divided between Labor and Nationalist parties, Brookfield held the balance of power in parliament, leaving Labor Premier John Storey entirely dependent on his vote. Brookfield used Chapman's interim report to lobby for the cause of Broken Hill's miners, who were seeking a reduced working week, increased wages, safer working conditions and compensation for occupational diseases. The miners had by this time had been on strike for fourteen months.

Upon release of the Technical Commission's interim findings, the companies and unions finally agreed to abide by the decision of an independent arbiter, Walter Edmunds of the Court of Industrial Arbitration. In September 1920, Edmunds handed down his decision on new award conditions for Broken Hill's miners, which was informed by the Technical Commission's recommendations. The Edmunds Award included a new 35 hour week for underground workers, removal and compensation for those suffering from pneumoconiosis and tuberculosis, compulsory medical examinations before entering the workforce, improved ventilation, use of water in drilling operations, and a compulsory lapse of one hour between shifts to allow dust to settle. Although not binding, the mining companies accepted the conditions.

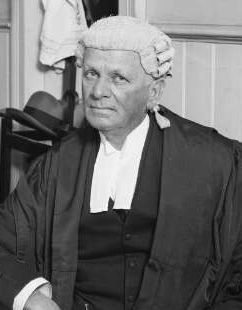
Justice Walter Edmunds

The Edmund's Award pushed the Big Strike towards resolution, pending the agreement on compensation to those suffering from pneumoconiosis and tuberculosis. Believing his honour was at stake, Commissioner Henry Chapman refused to divulge to the mining companies the names of the affected men until there was certainty about their right to compensation. By November 1920 both the unions and the companies had reached a compensation agreement and the protracted 18-month long strike was called off.

Several Acts of Parliament were passed as a result of the Chapman Commission's reports: the Workmen's Compensation (Broken Hill) Act (1920), the Workmen's Compensation (Lead Poisoning Broken Hill) Act (1922) and the Workmen's Compensation (Lead Poisoning) Amendment Act (1924). Passage of the acts ensured the full implementation of the Chapman Commission's recommendations, with compensation extending to the family members of those miners deceased, retired or relocated due to affliction with industrial disease.

The year 1922 saw the establishment of Broken Hill's Bureau of Medical Inspection, based on the commission's recommendation and financed by the mining companies. Designed to monitor the health of miners, it also served to certify the fitness of prospective employees. A strict examination by a government appointed doctor tested for 21 diseases including all major diseases of the lung and lead poisoning.

Finally, the physical improvements to mitigate dust were introduced to the mines in the 1920s. In the new ventilation system, air was drawn down the main shafts and out via centrifugal fans in updraft shafts. Doors were installed on ore passes and mill waste (used as fill) was pumped in as a liquid slurry. The introduction of a lighter hammer drill with an automatic water feed solved the problem of dust creation from boring.

== Sources ==
- Blainey, Geoffrey. (1968). The Rise of Broken Hill. Melbourne, VIC: Macmillan of Australia
- Kearns, Richard H. B. (1982). Broken Hill, a Pictorial History. Hawthorndene, SA: Investigator Press
- Kennedy, Brian (1978). Silver, Sin, and Sixpenny Ale. Carlton, VIC: Melbourne University Press
- Kennedy, Brian. (1984). A Tale of Two Mining Cities: Johannesburg and Broken Hill 1885–1925. Carlton, VIC : Melbourne University Press
- Koenig, Kay. (1983). Broken Hill: 100 Years of Mining. Sydney, NSW: New South Wales. Department of Mineral Resources
- New South Wales Board of Trade. (1919). Second Interim Report on the Prevalence of Miners' Phthisis and Pneumoconiosis in Certain Industries. Report upon the Constitution and Cost of a Technical Commission of Inquiry into Miners' Phthisis and other Diseases affecting Miners. Department of Labour and Industry, New South Wales State Government. (Cited as “New South Wales Board of Trade Second Interim Report”) Archived
- New South Wales Board of Trade. (1922). Further Reports of the Technical Commission of Inquiry Appointed to Investigate the Occurrence of Industrial Diseases in and about the Metalliferous Mines at Broken Hill. Department of Labour and Industry, New South Wales State Government. (Cited as “Chapman Commission Final Report”)
- Solomon, Robert. (2008). The Richest Lode : Broken Hill 1883–1988. Sydney, NSW: Austral Books. (Reprint. Original work published Sydney, NSW: Hale & Iremonger, 1988)
- Stokes, Edward. (1983). United We Stand : Impressions of Broken Hill, 1908–1910. Canterbury, VIC: Five Mile Press
