= Rabbit plagues in Australia =

Phenomenon of high numbers of rabbits in Australia

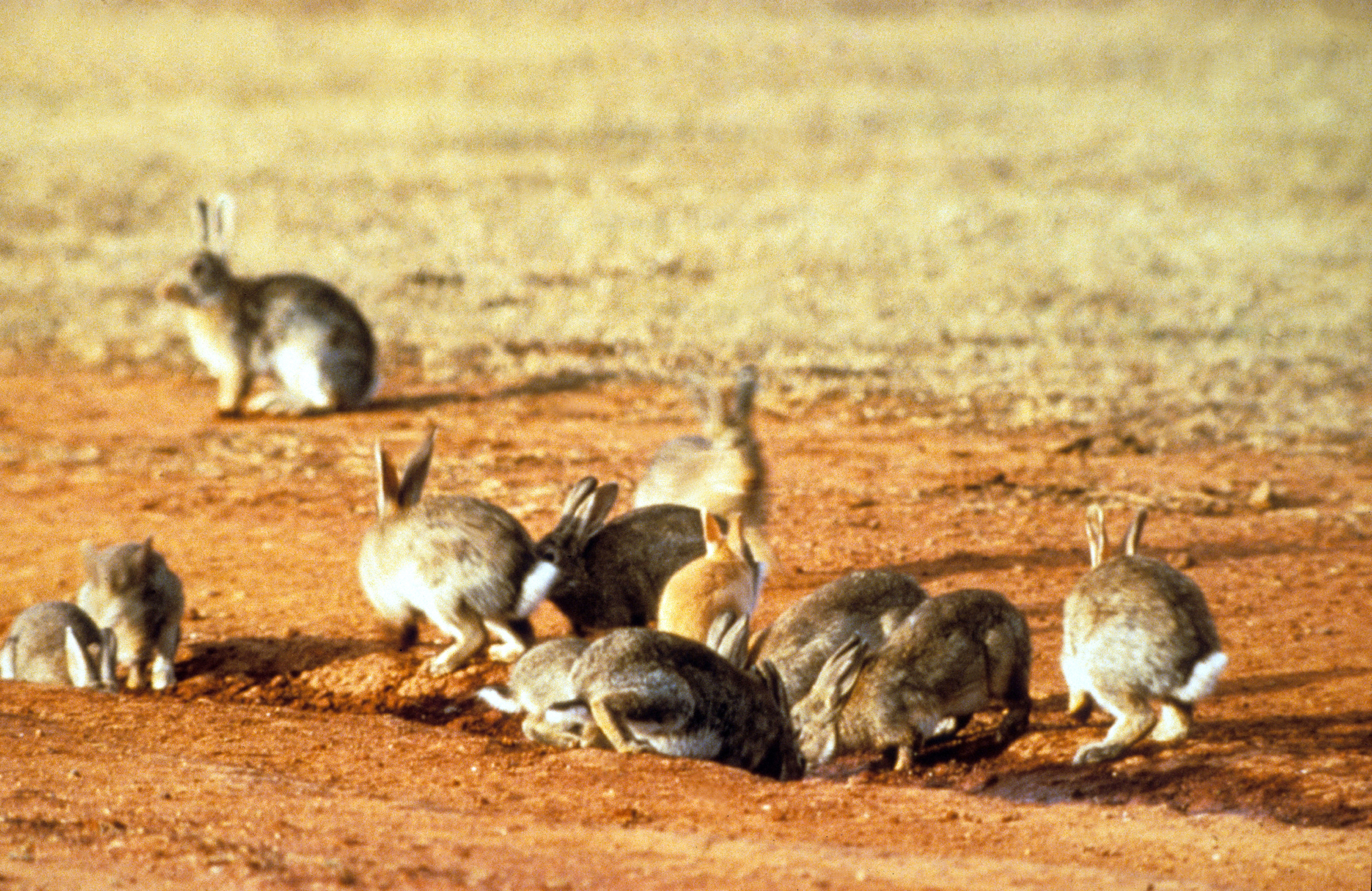
European rabbits in Australia 2004

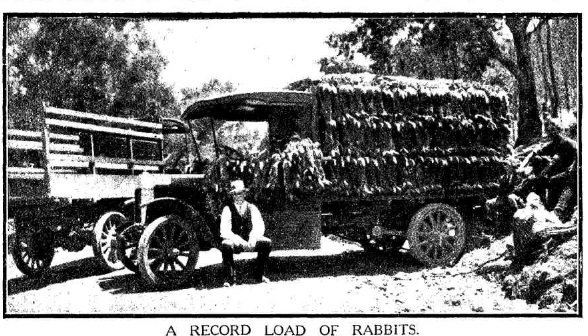
Load of over 3,800 rabbits at Mudgee caught during a plague, 1918

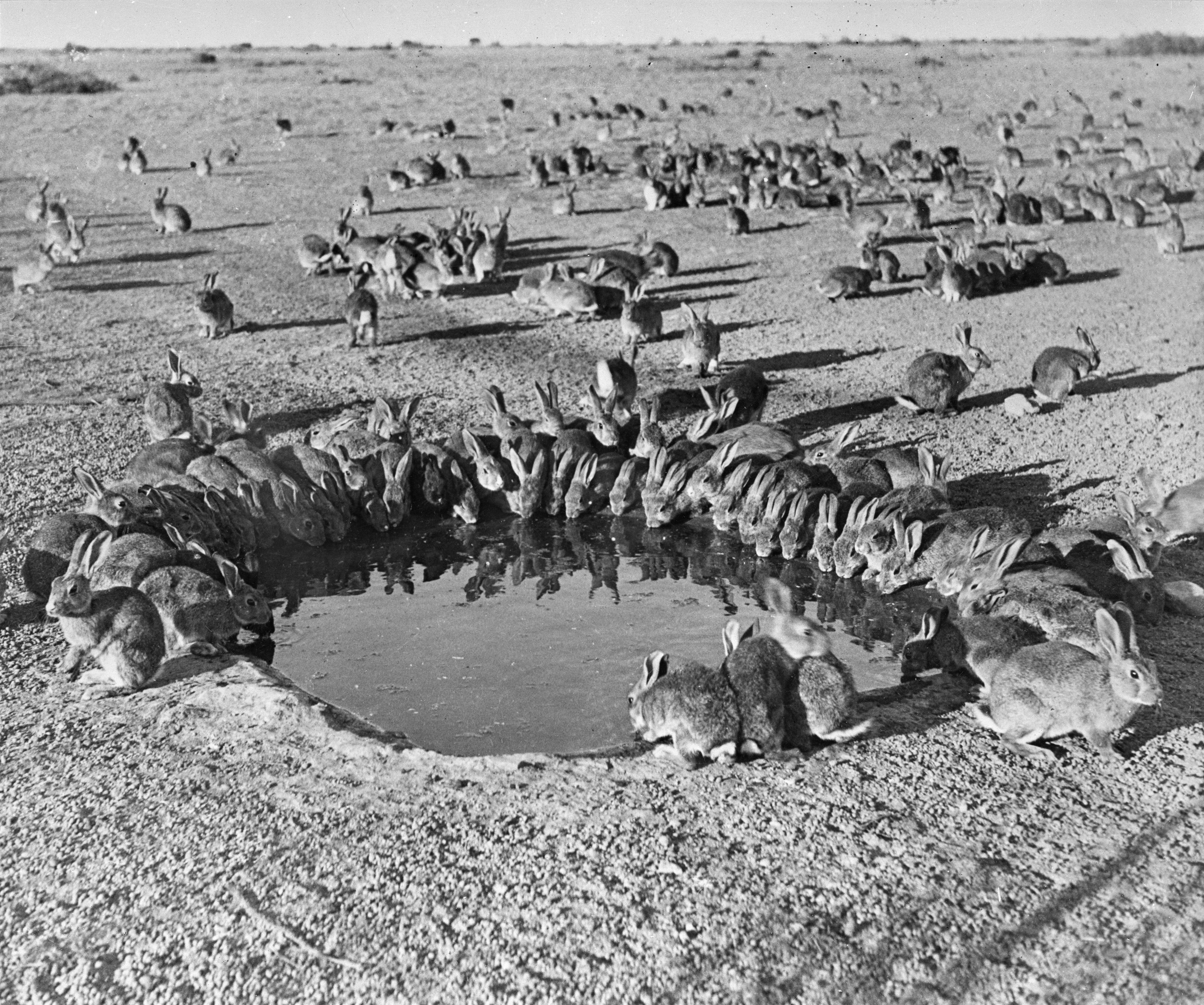
Rabbits around a waterhole at the myxomatosis trial enclosure on Wardang Island in 1938

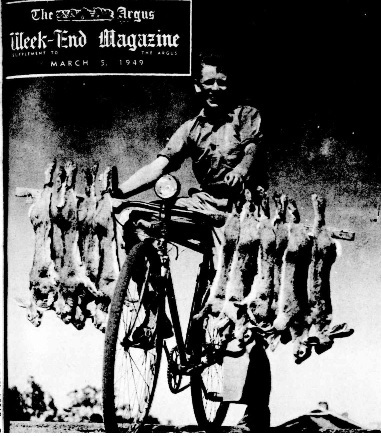
Boy with rabbits caught during plague in 1949 near Kerang

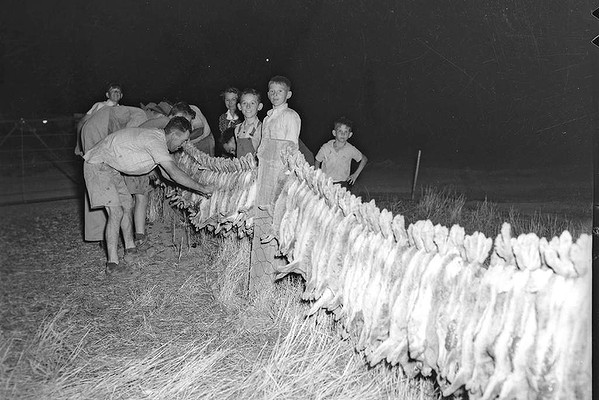
Rabbits in Warren, New South Wales during a plague in 1949

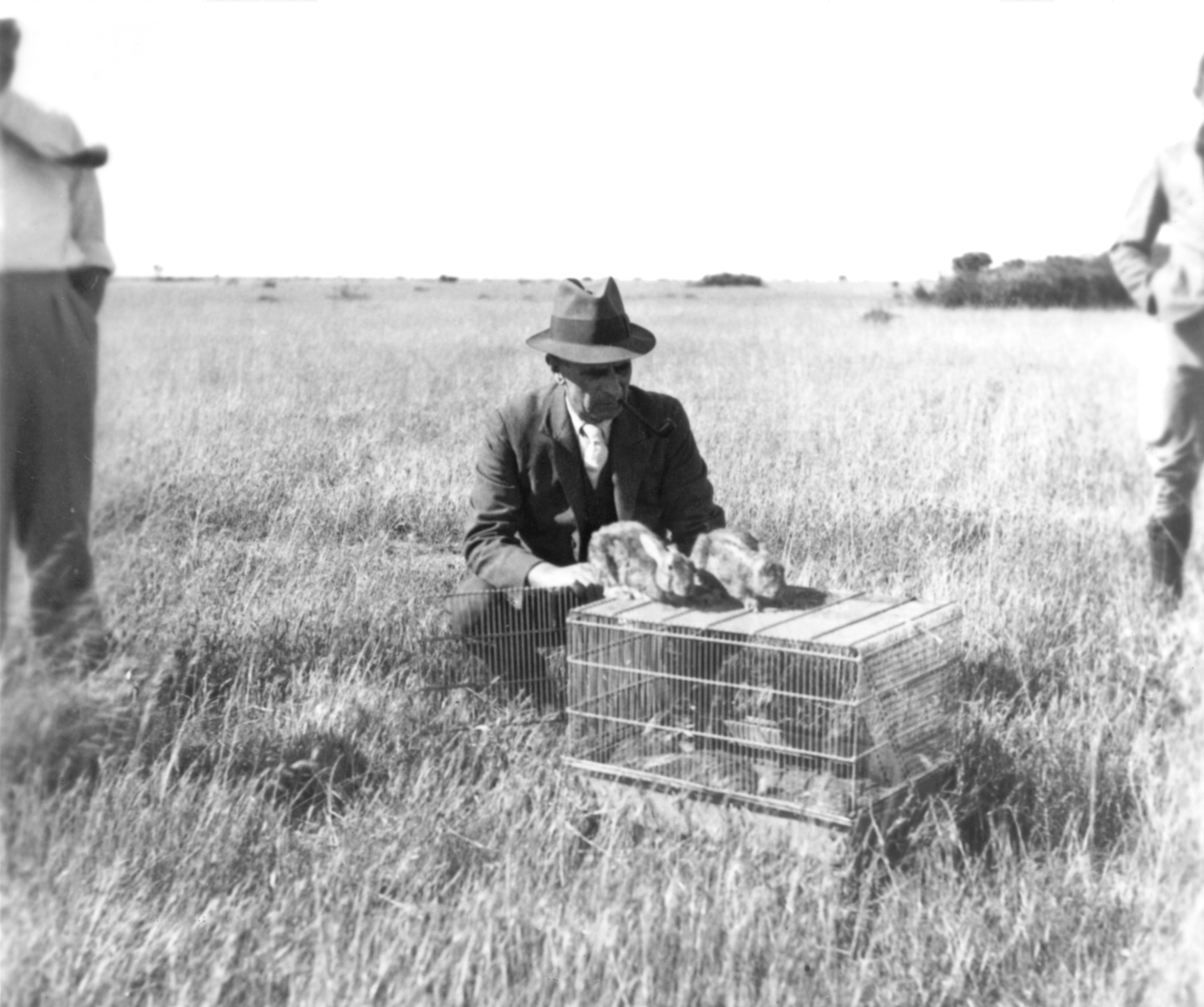
Releasing the Myxoma virus for Rabbits c. 1937

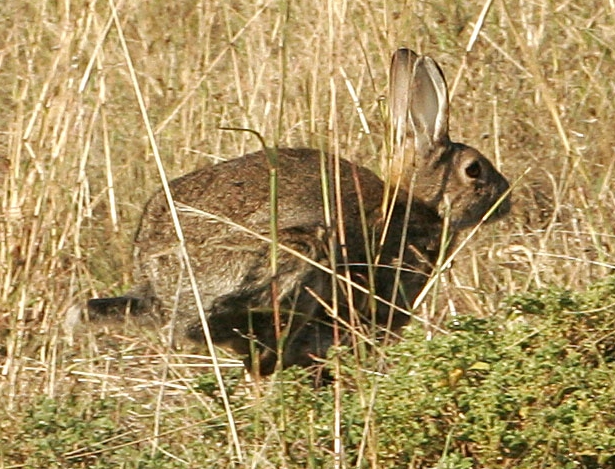
Wild rabbit in Australia

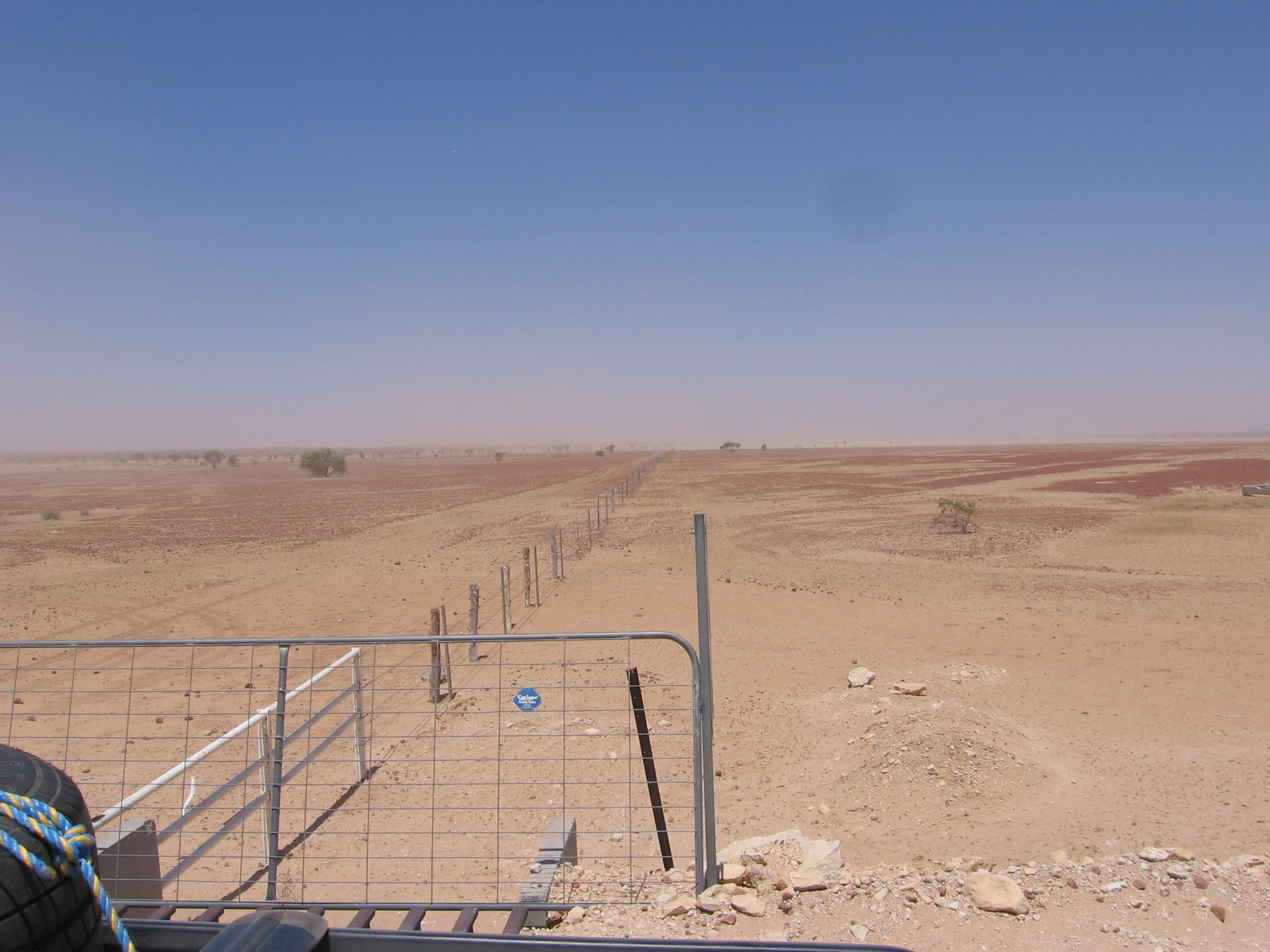
The Rabbit-Proof Fence, Australia, in 2006

Rabbit plagues in Australia have occurred several times throughout parts of Australia since wild European rabbits were introduced by European colonists.

== Introduction ==
Rabbits were introduced to Australia with the arrival of the First Fleet in 1788. A population of 24 rabbits were released near Geelong in 1859 to be hunted for sport. The native quolls predated upon rabbits and prior to 1870, many accounts recorded quolls impeding their establishment on the mainland while island colonies thrived. Quolls were systematically exterminated by colonists to defend introduced species such as chickens. Within 50 years rabbits had spread throughout most of the continent with devastating effects on indigenous flora and fauna.

The species had spread throughout Victoria and by 1880 was found in New South Wales. Rabbits were found in South Australia and Queensland by 1886 and by 1890 were in eastern parts of Western Australia and the Northern Territory in the 1900s. Feral rabbits were found throughout most of their current range by 1910.

== 1800s ==
Large numbers of rabbits were reported around Geelong in 1869 and around Campbell Town in Tasmania later the same year. A large scale plague occurred in 1871 throughout parts of Tasmania starting prior to March, with farmers using strychnine in an attempt to control numbers and continuing through to May of the same year.

In 1876 a plague was reported in districts around Kapunda in South Australia with a commission being established to find the cause and suitable methods of control of the problem.

Areas between the Riverina through to the Mallee country and Charlton were being plagued by large numbers of rabbits in 1877 and 1878. The Rabbits Nuisance Suppression Bill was introduced into the Parliament of Victoria in an effort to combat the problem. By 1878 and early 1879 the plague had spread into northern areas of South Australia Numbers of rabbits in the affected areas were still considered problematic through the 1880s and 1890s.

== 1900s ==
Large numbers of the pest were still found throughout parts of Victoria, New South Wales, South Australia and Western Australia through the early 1900s while the areas were also gripped by drought. After the drought broke in around 1904 numbers of rabbits and mice started to grow again in the same areas as well as parts of Queensland to plague proportions.

Following a reduction in numbers during the drought of 1914 to 1915, plagues of rabbits were reported in 1918 through parts of South Australia and western New South Wales.

In 1932 and 1933 rabbits again bred up in large numbers in parts of New South Wales, South Australia and Victoria causing massive damage to crops and feed.

The same year, Jean Macnamara – a young Australian scientist working in America – was undertaking research into the use of the myxoma virus in rabbits following a rabbit outbreak in California. After an unsuccessful attempt to send the virus to Australia, Macnamara carried it with her to London, handing over her data to fellow scientist Charles Martin to continue testing. Martin concluded that the virus caused no harm to surrounding wildlife, livestock, or humans so field trials began on Wardang Island. However, the virus failed to transmit between rabbits and in 1943 experiments were halted.

After World War II – during which time Australia's rabbit population grew due to lack of culling – Macnamara resumed myxoma virus tests on rabbit populations, with field trials beginning in 1950. These trials showed that wetter climates enabled the virus to spread, where mosquitoes and other insects carried the virus between rabbits. This led to rabbit populations declining rapidly by 1953.

Field trials for the myxomatosis virus were carried out in 1936 by the CSIR Division of Animal Health and Nutrition as a method of controlling rabbit population. The trials were successful in killing rabbits in their warrens but did not spread well between warrens.

By 1946 another plague was being predicted by graziers following a drought breaking, and numbers of rabbits started to rise in 1948 and continue into 1949 and 1950 causing massive damage to crops in parts of New South Wales, Victoria and South Australia in a plague described as the worst rabbit plague in Australia's history.

The myxomatosis virus was released in 1950 to reduce pest rabbit numbers. It initially reduced the wild rabbit population by 95% but since then resistance to the virus has increased.

== 2000s ==
Another plague occurred in 2011 in parts of South Australia, the worst that had occurred in Australia since the release of the calicivirus in 1995.

== See also ==
- Rabbits in Australia
- Mouse plagues in Australia
