= Day Dream Smelter =

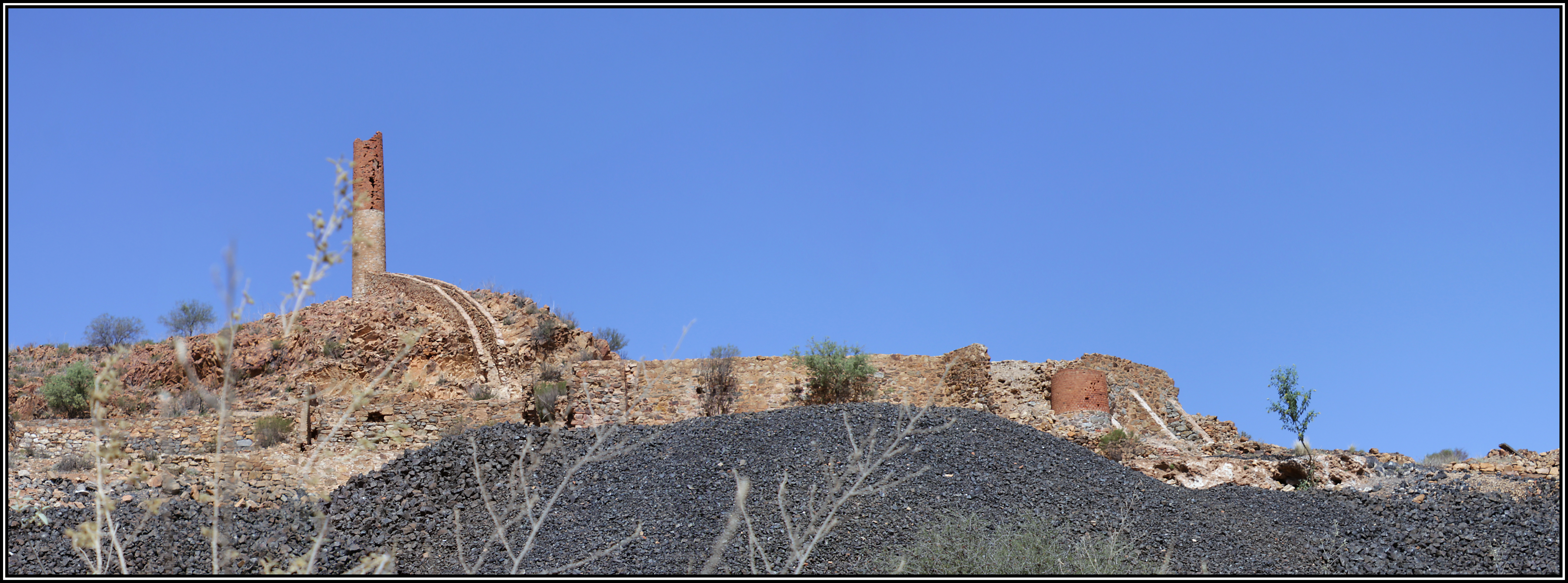
- The ruins of the Day Dream Mine smelter, 2013

- Location within New South Wales Location within Australia
- 31.8145°S 141.3476°E
- Location: Por. PML 2, Broken Hill, New South Wales, Australia

Site notes
- Owner: Broken Hill City Council

New South Wales Heritage Register
- Official name: Day Dream Smelter; DayDream Smelter
- Type: state heritage (archaeological-terrestrial)
- Designated: 2 April 1999
- Reference no.: 182
- Type: Mine site
- Category: Mining and Mineral Processing

Day Dream Smelter is a heritage-listed former smelter and archaeological site located approximately 20 km north-west of Broken Hill, New South Wales, Australia. The property is owned by the Broken Hill City Council. It was added to the New South Wales State Heritage Register on 2 April 1999.

== History ==
The Day Dream Smelter, situated about 20 kilometres north-west of Broken Hill and north-east of Silverton, was established as a settlement following the discovery of rich silver-bearing ore in December 1882 and by 1884 there were some 400 to 500 people on the field. The Day Dream mine by 1884 had become important. It raised 96,000 tons of ore before it floated into a company.

The Day Dream Smelter was built by the Barrier Ranges Association which was formed in the early days of the field to take over mines, work them, establish smelters and otherwise develop the field.

The Day Dream Smelter was opened in 1885. It had a 25-ton and a 40-ton water-jacket furnace. The Day Dream mine proved short lived and in April 1886, after only 10 months of operation, the smelter was closed down as there was not sufficient ore to keep it going. Sometime soon afterward during 1886-87 the smelters were re-opened to treat the first production from the Broken Hill Mine, some 1,500 tons of ore, as the broken Hill mine had not then started its own furnaces.

By the end of 1888 the Day Dream Settlement was almost abandoned and the smelters closed forever. Nothing remains of the settlement. All the machinery of the smelter was removed and all the salvageable material of the smelter buildings - timber and galvanised iron has long since gone.

What remains of the smelter is interesting and very strongly evocative. Standing in dramatic isolation on a round hill in the arid Barrier Range, it remains a prominent reminder of the intense activity and high expectations which were later eclipsed by the wealth of the lode at Broken Hill.

In 1980 the Heritage Council visited the site during its visit to Broken Hill. Subsequently, the Barrier Environment Group nominated Day Dream Smelter for a Permanent Conservation Order. On 11 February 1983 a Permanent Conservation order was placed over the smelter. It was transferred to the State Heritage Register on 2 April 1999.

== Description ==
Remaining structures on the site include the chimney stack, adjoining surface trench, stone walls and platform upon which the smelter structures were erected, shaft access holes and mullock retaining walls.

The coursed rubble stone based walls of the smelter stand on the hillside and are connected up the slope to the hilltop by the stone side walls of a rising flue tunnel which connects to the chimney stack on the hill top. The circular chimney stack is built of stone for its lower half and brick for its upper half.

It was reported as at 3 October 2000 that the brickwork of the upper chimney stack was built in very weak mortar which was being eroded by rainwater from the top downwards.

== Heritage listing ==
The remains of the Day Dream Smelter are a significant item of the environmental heritage of New South Wales as an important item in the mining and industrial history of the Broken Hill-Silverton area which pre-dates the development of Broken Hill itself. The masonry wall and chimney remains are interesting. What remains of the smelter is interesting and very strongly evocative. Standing in dramatic isolation on a round hill in the arid Barrier Range, it remains a prominent reminder of the intense activity and high expectations which were later eclipsed by the wealth of the lode at Broken Hill.

Day Dream Smelter was listed on the New South Wales State Heritage Register on 2 April 1999 having satisfied the following criteria.

The place is important in demonstrating the course, or pattern, of cultural or natural history in New South Wales.

The remains of the Day Dream Smelter are a significant item of the environmental heritage of New South Wales as an important item in the mining and industrial history of the Broken Hill-Silverton area which pre-dates the development of Broken Hill itself.

The place is important in demonstrating aesthetic characteristics and/or a high degree of creative or technical achievement in New South Wales.

What remains of the smelter is interesting and very strongly evocative. Standing in dramatic isolation on a round hill in the arid Barrier Range, it remains a prominent reminder of the intense activity and high expectations which were later eclipsed by the wealth of the lode at Broken Hill.
