= Electrical Trades Union of Australia =

Australian trade union

ETU
- Electrical Trades Union of Australia
- Founded: 24 December 1919
- Headquarters: Rosebery, New South Wales
- Location: Australia
- Members: 61,260 (For the year ending 31 December 2020)
- Key people: Michael Wright, National Secretary
- Affiliations: ACTU, ALP
- Website: www.etunational.asn.au

The Electrical Trades Union of Australia (ETU) is an Australian trade union.

The ETU is a division of the Communications, Electrical and Plumbing Union (CEPU), and is the largest of the three divisions. Under State Government laws, the union often exists as a separately registered union.

== History ==
On 24 December 1919, Electrical Trades Union of Australia federally re-registered under the Commonwealth Conciliation and Arbitration Act 1904 as an association of employees. This date is now taken as the official registration date of the Federal Union.

In 1985, ETU members who were on strike were sacked by the Joh Bjelke-Petersen Government for refusing to sign individual contracts.

In 2005, plans were made to picket the former premier's State funeral, however those plans were subsequently abandoned following requests by the union leadership.

In 2007, the ETU leader Dean Mighell was expelled from the Australian Labor Party for supporting the Greens during the federal election. In the lead-up to the 2010 federal election, the Victorian ETU withdrew its support for the Labor Party, citing Labor's refusal to scrap laws restricting union action on building sites. However, since then it has rejoined in the Australian Capital Territory and Victoria.

Traditionally the ETU has sided with the Labor Left or equivalent faction in the state branches of the ALP. It enjoys a close relationship there with the Shop, Distributive and Allied Employees Association (SDA) and the Australian Workers Union (AWU). Despite reaffiliating with Victorian Labor, in the leadup to the 2018 Victorian Election the ETU donated $50,000 towards a competing party, the Victorian Socialists.

In November 2019, the ETU ceased donations to the federal Labor party over Anthony Albanese supporting free trade agreements.
