= Brushmen of the Bush =

Brushmen of the Bush was a painting group of five artists who collaborated in Broken Hill, New South Wales in 1973. It was active until 1989. The five members of the group were Pro Hart, Eric Minchin, Jack Absalom, John Pickup and Hugh Schulz.

Following their inaugural exhibition in 1973, the name Brushmen of the Bush was coined by Lorraine Hickman for a two-page article in The Australian Women's Weekly. More than 50 subsequent exhibitions raised over one million, six hundred and forty thousand Australian dollars for various charities, notably the Royal Flying Doctor Service. During the 1970s, Brushmen of the Bush exhibited in London (twice), Rome, New York City and Los Angeles.

The Broken Hill City Council declared 2006 "The Year of the Brushmen of the Bush" to honour the Group's contribution to the city through art. The Broken Hill Regional Gallery also mounted a "Brushmen of the Bush" Retrospective Exhibition, curated by Bettina MacAulay, (who also authored the very detailed history of the Group). The Brushmen of the Bush Retrospective Exhibition toured eleven regional galleries in New South Wales, Victoria, South Australia and Queensland from 2006 to 2009.

Forty-four Brushmen exhibitions were staged for charity and further exhibitions organised by dealer and civic galleries have taken the total number of exhibitions to well over fifty.

The Group exhibitions were always staged in aid of charitable organisations (particularly for children) and donations of paintings for auction and raffles swelled the commissions on sales to over $1,640,000 when CPI calculations adjust the 1973 to 1989 dollar figures to today's values.

Eric Minchin died on 15 June 1994, Hugh Schulz on 23 September 2005 and Pro Hart was afforded a State Funeral following his death on 28 March 2006. Jack Absalom died on 22 March 2019 in Broken Hill, and the final Brushman, John Pickup, died on 31 January 2023 at his home in Murwillumbah, they were both 91.

Broken Hill's current thriving arts scene traces its roots back to the Brushmen of the Bush.
