= 1985 Queensland SEQEB strike =

The SEQEB strike of Queensland was a dispute between the Electrical Trades Union (ETU) and SEQEB, on behalf of the government of Queensland in 1985. Electricity supply for the South East Queensland region of Australia was affected between 6 February and 7 March 1985 by labour union strikes initiated by the ETU of SEQEB. On 11 February 1985 the Queensland government led by Premier Joh Bjelke-Petersen “sacked” over 1000 linesmen and other workers for refusing to return to work after they had been ordered to do so. A State of Emergency was enacted by the government on 7 February and operated until 7 March. For a fortnight some 17,000 homes in South East Queensland were without power on a rotating scheme. Many industries were forced to shut down costing the economy an estimated $1 billion. The dispute enabled the Premier to introduce a number of legislative measures to curtail future union activity.

== Background to the dispute ==
Between 1979 and 1984, the South East Queensland Electricity Generating Board (SEQEB) negotiated with the Electrical Trades Union (ETU) regarding working conditions for Electrical Trades Union employees and the use of casual contractors. SEQEB wanted to be able to employ cheaper casual staff to fix faults and connect power. The ETU was opposed to the privatisation of their industry. The ETU believed the move toward employing casual and contract staff would reduce job security for their employees, increase the length of the working week and would affect wage conditions.

Negotiations continued into early February 1985 when discussions stalled on 6 February. This resulted in over 1000 electrical workers going on strike indefinitely in support of the union, which immediately cut electricity to residents of Queensland.

== Strike action ==
The Premier of Queensland declared a State of Emergency on 7 February under the State Transport Act 1938 in efforts to reestablish the supply of electricity. When the ETU rejected the orders of the Industrial Commission to return to negotiations, the striking workers were "sacked" on 11 February. Operators of the respective power stations across Queensland cut supply in support of the striking workers. Included in this group were staff who were members of the Municipal Officers Association, who were also threatened with fines for showing support for the ETU workers. Working class support for the strike was strong with many other unions going out in protest with them. Domestic households and small business' within South East Queensland were forced to use candles, kerosene lamps and torches for lighting and power as “load shedding’ was employed to satisfy nightly demand for electricity for 14 days. After negotiation, ETU officials agreed to turn the lights back on and ordered a return to work on 6 March 1985 but many of the sacked workers and their families rejected the ETU decision due to the demands within the offer, which rolled back their conditions of employment as well as other requirements.

The Premier ordered the Commissioner of Police, Terry Lewis to maintain a police presence outside of SEQEB depots to prevent workers, who wished to return to work from being harassed for being ‘scabs’.

The ETU was fined and the government pushed for it to be de-registered. The Premier refused to negotiate possible solutions in the Queensland Industrial Commission. The Bjelke Petersen government introduced new bills into parliament, including the Electricity Bill (Continuity of Supply), to forbid strikes and picketing by electricity workers. The bills included provision for the confiscation of workers property including their homes if they went out on strike, as well as significant fines. Union officials were banned from places of employment. Wages and conditions could be set by the Queensland Electricity Commissioner and any worker who protested could be fined or dismissed.

Emergency union funds rapidly ran out. Many of the workers returned to work under new agreements or in new positions. By April 1985 more than 200 people had been arrested while protesting at rallies, including Senator George Georges. A trade blockage in April by workers from other unions was ordered to cease by the Australian government. The dispute dragged on until October 1985.

== Representation in popular culture ==
The play, The hope of the world by Errol O'Neill was produced by the Queensland Theatre Company in 1996. Its unspoken background is the SEQEB dispute. Brisbane punk band La Fetts adapted their song "We hate relatives" to become "SEQEB Scabs" in 1985. It played in constant rotation on underground radio in Brisbane and featured in their set at the "Festival of Electric Lights" rally in King George Square, Brisbane. The documentary film, Friends and enemies (1987) by Tom Zubrycki, features interviews conducted with people representing union and government points of view to the SEQEB dispute over an 8-month period.

Andrew McGahan's 2000 novel Last Drinks is partly set against the episode in Queensland's political history.

== Legacy ==
The Queensland government de-registered the Electrical Trades Union for 6 months in the State Industrial Commission, the first deregistration of a union in 40 years. By October 1985, the government approved new measures to widen the use of "contract and casual labor". The ACTU failed in their negotiations on behalf of the ETU. The strike had lasting impacts on both the Queensland union movement as well as nationally. The actions of the Bjelke-Petersen government in this dispute have been said to have helped mobilise the labour movement within Queensland and led to the Fitzgerald Inquiry into police corruption and Bjelke-Petersen's resignation in 1987.
