= 1919–20 Broken Hill mining strike =

1919-20 worker strike in Australia

The Broken Hill miners' strike of 1919–20 was fought over safety conditions in the mines and eventually resulted in the Holman ministry (1916–1920) setting up a royal commission into the mining industry at Broken Hill.
