= Pro Hart =

Australian artist (1928–2006)

Pro Hart MBE
- Born: Kevin Charles Hart; 30 May 1928; Broken Hill
- Died: 28 March 2006 (aged 77); Broken Hill
- Spouse: Raylee June Tonkin
- Children: Kym Hart; David Hart

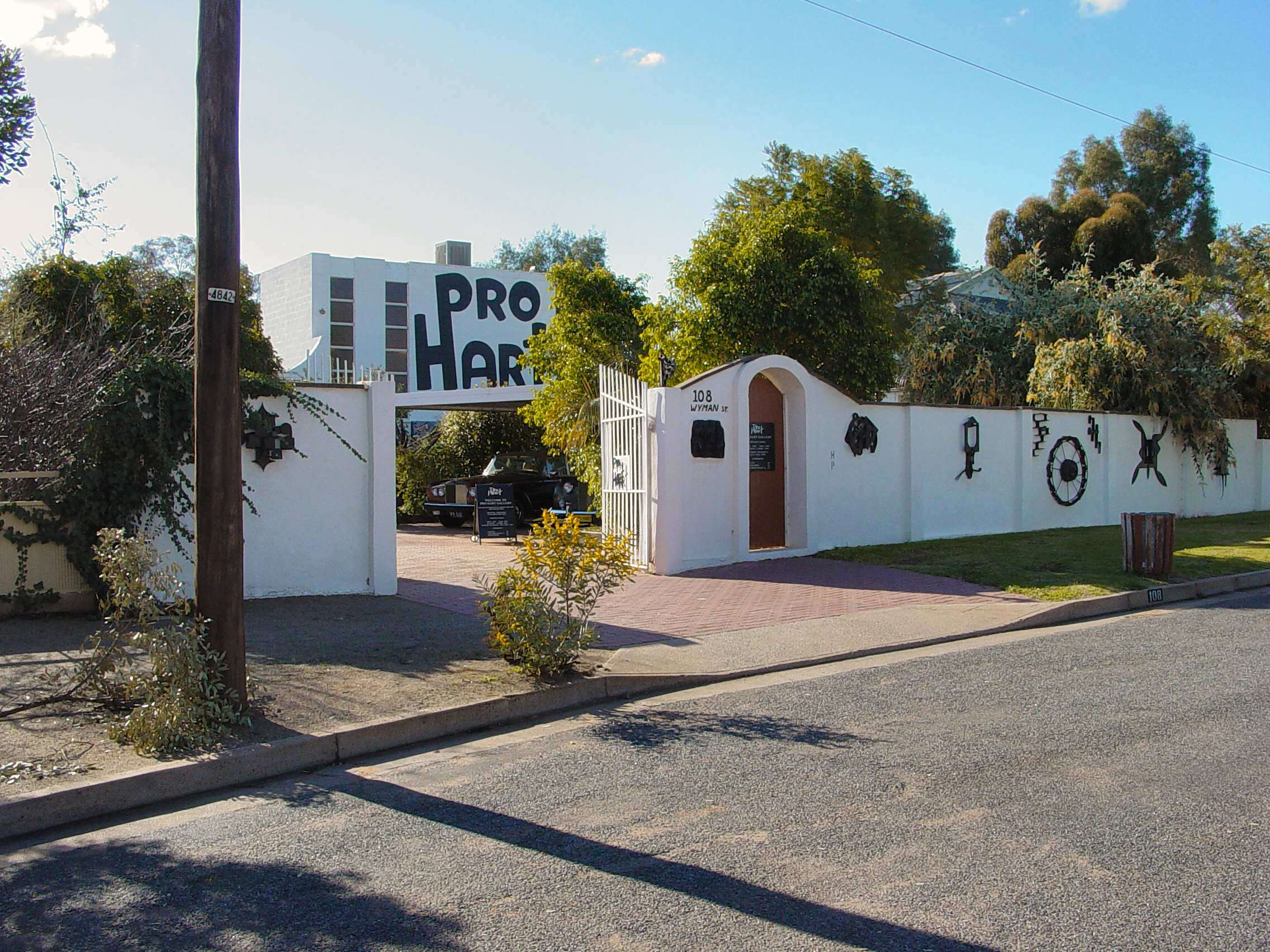
The Pro Hart Gallery in Broken Hill

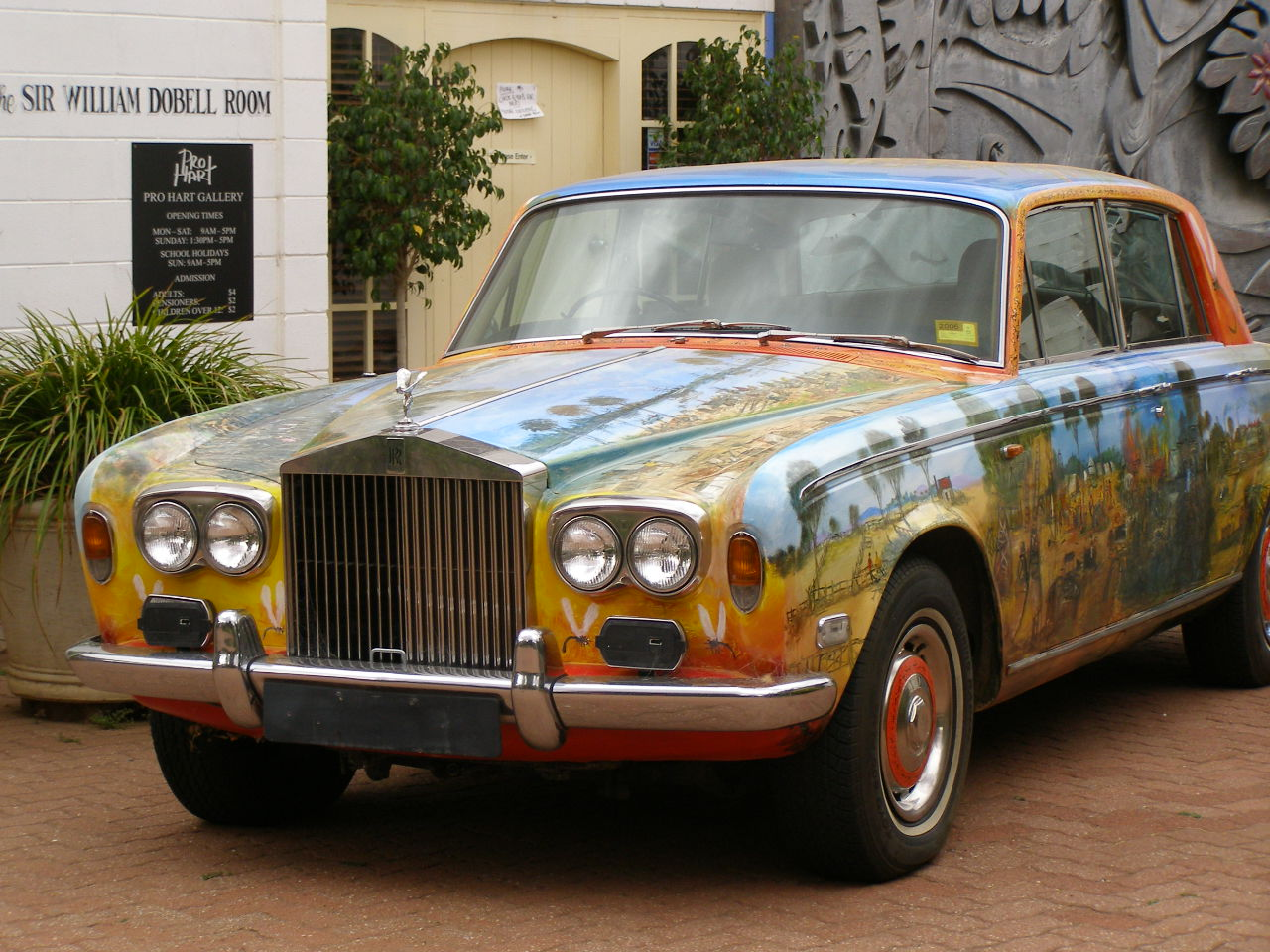
One of Pro Hart's Rolls-Royce Silver Shadows, painted in his unique style, is housed at the gallery

Kevin Charles "Pro" Hart, MBE (30 May 1928 – 28 March 2006), was an Australian artist, born in Broken Hill, New South Wales, who was considered the father of the Australian Outback painting movement; his works are widely admired for capturing the true spirit of the outback. He grew up on his family's sheep farm in Menindee and was nicknamed "Professor" (hence "Pro") during his younger days, when he was known as an inventor.

== Art styles ==
Hart typically painted with oils or acrylics, using paint brushes and sponges, and depict scenes of rural town life, nature, topical commentary, and some religious subjects. His illustrations for the collection of Henry Lawson's poems show keen powers of character observation combined with an obvious wit. Hart was also a sculptor, working with welded steel, bronze and ceramics.

Pro Hart was known for his novel techniques including "cannon painting" and "balloon painting". An example of his cannon painting technique appeared in a famous 1988 television commercial Hart appeared in which saw the artist create the image of a dragonfly on carpet using food. In 2002 he was using his own DNA as a mark of authenticity in his paintings. Retrospective application of a DNA mark is available for older Pro Hart paintings.

For most of his career Hart was dismissed by many critics as a mere showman, with his art often judged as populist and derivative, and not good enough for serious critical attention. Barry Pearce, the head curator of Australian art at the Art Gallery of New South Wales said that comparing Hart with the artists whose work normally hangs in the gallery was "rather like Slim Dusty being compared to Mozart". Hart considered his critics to be a part of the "art mafia" and noted that he achieved his success without any help from the arts establishment.

== Beliefs ==
He frequently addressed political themes in his artwork. When asked about this subject, he stated "If I said what I thought sometimes, I might get sued so I paint to show what is going on, to bring out the truth and make people aware".

The painting Aboriginal Land Rights is from Pro Hart's "masks" period. This painting highlights his conspiracy ideas with regards to land rights. The scene has a map of Australia with the Aboriginal flag over the top. The people in the background "playing the communist cards" have Illuminati logos on their ties. In the foreground are a group of Aboriginal people, perhaps negotiating their rights.

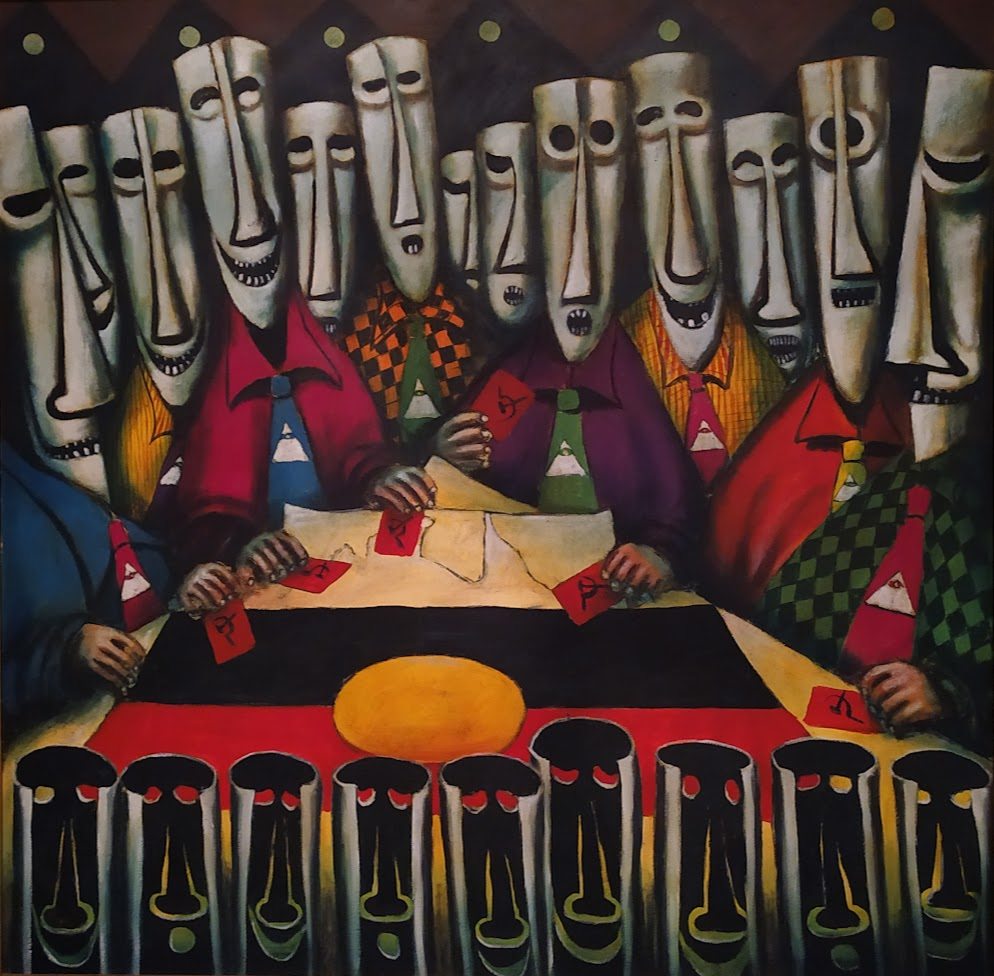
Pro Hart Land Rights Painting

== Pastimes ==
He collected vintage cars and motor cycles, and invented many kinds of engines and machines. He enjoyed pistol shooting, reading the Bible, and organ music. He was the proud owner of a Rodgers electric pipe organ, which was said to be the largest of its kind in Australia. This was installed in his gallery, a step which considerably enhanced its value as a Broken Hill tourist attraction.

== Awards ==
He was made a Member of the Order of the British Empire in 1976. In 1982 he received an Honorary Life Membership of Society International Martinique for outstanding artistic achievement. He received an Australian Citizen of the Year award in 1983, and was known for his charitable work and generosity.

== Final years ==
Pro Hart developed motor neurone disease. He died on 28 March 2006. He had been unable to paint for the last six months of his life. A large state funeral was held for him on 4 April 2006 in Broken Hill.

He was interred in the Broken Hill cemetery.
