= Federated Moulders' (Metals) Union of Australia =

Australian trade union

FMMUA
- Federated Moulders' (Metals) Union of Australia
- Merged into: Amalgamated Metals, Foundry and Shipwrights' Union
- Founded: 1899
- Dissolved: 1983
- Headquarters: Victorian Trades Hall, Carlton, Victoria
- Location: Australia
- Members: 6,000 (1976)
- Publication: The Australian Foundry Worker (1956 - 1970)
- Affiliations: ACTU, ALP, Metal Trades Federation, VTHC

The Federated Moulders' (Metals) Union of Australia (FMMUA) was an Australian trade union which existed between 1899 and 1983. It represented moulders – skilled tradesmen who fabricated the moulds for casting metal products in foundries. In spite of only organising within a single skilled occupation, which kept total membership low, the vital position of moulders in major industries such as mining, manufacturing and the railways, ensured that the union remained industrially powerful with a reputation for being highly militant.

Founded at the turn of 20th century, the union was formed as a federation of several smaller bodies based in the various Australian colonies. The FMMUA was fiercely protective of its status as a craft union made up of highly trained and highly skilled workers, and consistently resisted attempts by employers and governments to reduce costs or increase production in the industry through the use of unskilled labour. This issue was particularly acute during the economic crisis of the 1930s, which greatly weakened the union's bargaining position relative to employers, and during the Second World War, when the federal government sought to rapidly increase output in the metal manufacturing industry. Despite hostility to encroachment from unskilled labour, which at times engendered conflict with other unions and opposition to women's employment as moulders, the FMMUA did co-operate with other metal trades unions from the 1930s onwards on issues of common interest, such as improving wages and working conditions across the metal and engineering industry. During the latter part of the 20th century the union's membership came under increasing pressure due to technological change and automation, as well as the decline of Australian heavy industry caused by globalisation and off-shoring, leading the union to finally amalgamate with the Amalgamated Metal Workers and Shipwrights Union in 1983, following protracted and contentious negotiations.

== History ==
=== 1910s: Foundation ===
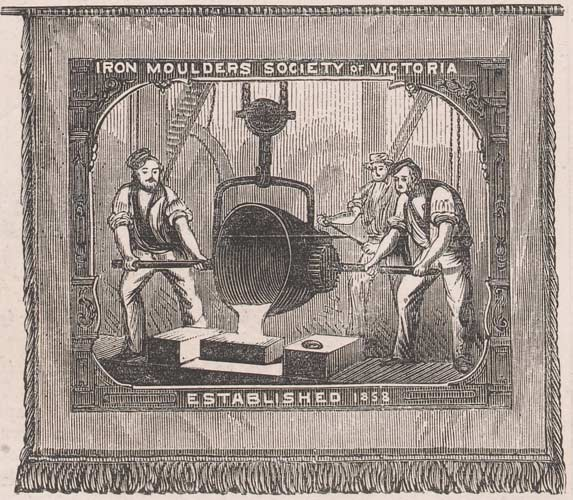
Iron Moulders' Society of Victoria banner, 1873.

Trade unionism among moulders in Australia began in 1858 with the establishment of the Iron Moulders' Society of Victoria (sometimes also referred to as the Ironfounders' Trade Union of Victoria or the Friendly Trade Society of Iron Moulders of Victoria). This was shortly followed by the Friendly Trade Society of Ironmoulders of NSW, the Queensland Moulders' Society, and a similar union in South Australia by 1882. An early instance of industrial unrest in the trade occurred in 1861 when ironmoulders at the Sydney foundry of P. N. Russell & Company went on strike after being refused overtime rates when working in excess of eight hours per day. The strike lasted for seven months but was ultimately unsuccessful. These state-based unions became largely inactive during the 1890s depression, due to the decline in employment among moulders, but began to recover towards the end of the decade.

The Federated Ironmoulders' Union of Australasia was formed in 1899 through the amalgamation of state-based unions in New South Wales, Victoria and Queensland. At the union's 1904 conference the name was changed slightly to the Federated Iron, Brass and Steel Moulders' Union of Australasia; at the same conference a South Australian District of the union was formed. The union's NSW branch (the strongest of the state branches) registered under the Industrial Arbitration Act, 1901 (NSW) almost immediately, although it did not manage to achieve a state industrial award until 1911. The union soon found the state arbitration system to be restrictive and unwieldy, and its use of direct industrial action and strikes led to its deregistration under the state system in 1916; however, by this time it had begun proceedings to register under the federal arbitration system, which it achieved in the same year.

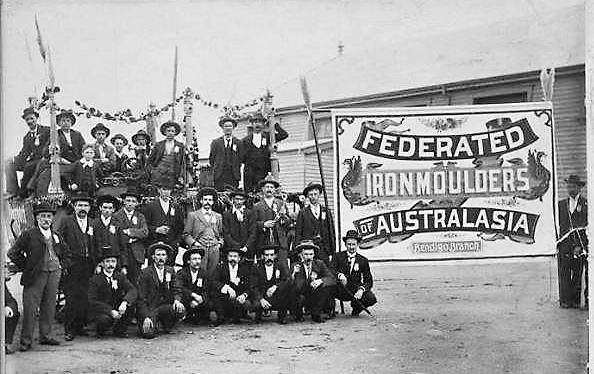
Members of the Bendigo branch of Federated Ironmoulders' Union of Australasia

=== 1920s: Demarcation ===
Although machine moulding was first introduced into Australia in the late 19th century the union initially refused to admit machine and plate moulders, regarding the work as relatively unskilled compared to that done by fully qualified 'jobbing' moulders. These workers were therefore organised by industrial unions, such as the Federated Stove and Piano Frame Makers Association of Australia and the Federated Agricultural Implement Machinery and Ironworkers Association of Australia. Over time, and as technology within foundries developed, an ever-increasing proportion of work was performed by semi-skilled machine operators, leading to the tradesmen moulders becoming increasingly isolated within the industry. In 1920 the Federated Moulders did expand its coverage to allow machine moulders to join, although the union's staunch opposition to the piece-work system of payment under which most machine moulders worked meant that few could become members (the union would fine or expel any member who accepted piecework or bonus payments). During the early 1920s conflict between the moulders' union and the new industrial unions led to frequent strikes, as the moulders' union sought to protect their traditional privileged status as craftsmen and restrict the entry of semi-skilled labour into the trade.

The union obtained a federal award in 1924, prescribing a 48-hour working week. This was later reduced to 44 hours in May 1927, following an hours claim before the federal arbitration court, organised on behalf of the metal trades unions by the Commonwealth Council of Unions.

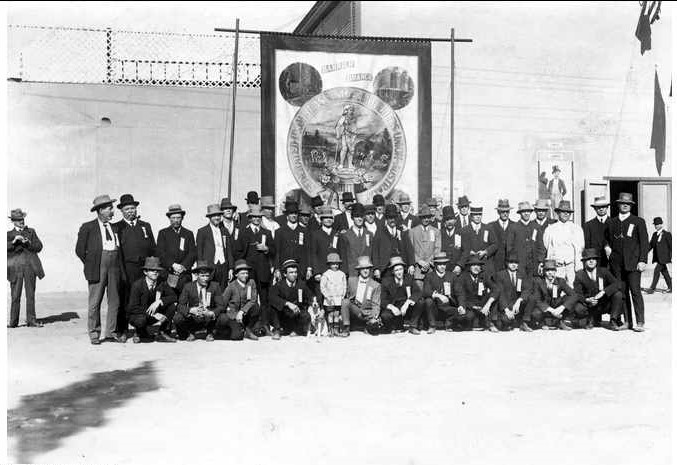
Members of the Barrier Branch of the Federated Iron Brass and Steel Moulders' Union, ca. 1919

=== 1930s: Depression ===
The union's membership reached a peak of 3,845 in 1928, before falling during the Great Depression to less than 3,300. The union estimated that two thirds of its members were totally unemployed in 1931, with the remainder generally under-employed. The decline in employment crippled the union, and workplace activism in the moulding trade was almost non-existent during the first half on the 1930s. Conditions in the industry were also seriously undermined during this period by the 1930 metal trades award, handed down by Justice Beeby, which reduced wages and shift allowances, expanded the role of semi-skilled process workers in the industry and allowed for the use of 'payment by results', or piecework, by employers. The union's name was changed in 1930 to the Federated Moulders' (Metals) Union of Australia, which would remain its title for the rest of its existence.

The union's membership began to recover during the late 1930s, and by 1938 had recovered to its pre-Depression levels. During this period the union developed a reputation for being highly militant. In June 1935 the NSW executives of the FMMUA and the Federated Ironworkers Association (FIA) formed a foundry workers' joint management committee in Sydney which worked to increase union density in the industry. The new structure was highly successful, spreading to Newcastle in 1936 and South Australia by 1940. In September 1936 the joint shop committees in Sydney launched a ban on overtime, calling for a 40-hour working week and an increase in wages. The overtime ban spread to Newcastle in January 1937. When employers refused the wage increase workers went on strike and the employers capitulated after five weeks. In March 1937 the Metal Trades Employers' Association (MTEA) launched a lockout of foundry workers aimed at ending the overtime embargo. The lockout ended in failure after six weeks, with workers winning a further increase in wages and an end to the systematic use of overtime in the industry.

During the late 1930s the FMMUA also initiated a campaign to obtain compensation for foundry workers diagnosed with silicosis, caused by inhaling the fine sand used to make moulds for casting. Despite the campaign, safety and industrial hygiene standards in Australian foundries remained extremely primitive up until the Second World War.

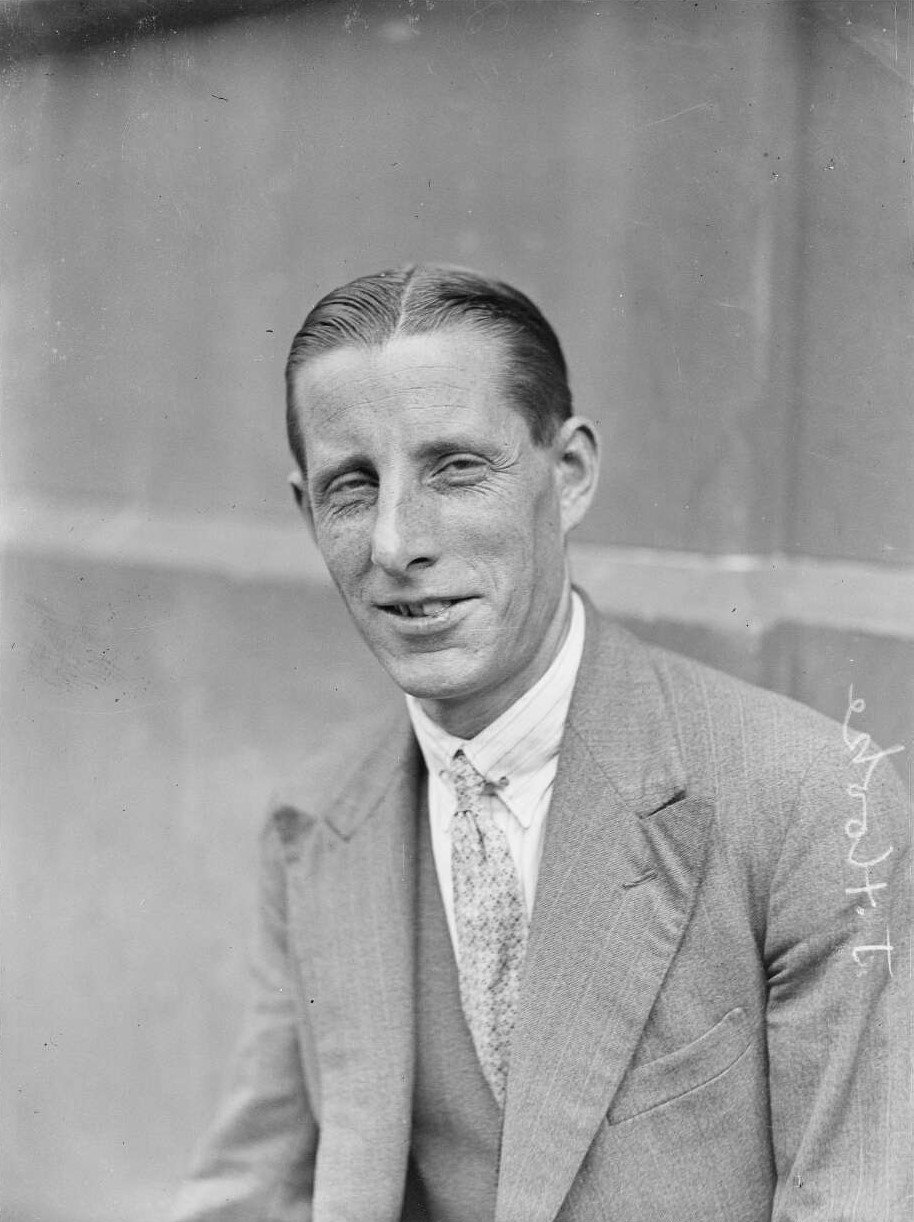
J. Hooke, federal secretary and arbitration agent of the FMMUA, 1931.

=== 1940s: Dilution ===
During WWII the union vociferously opposed dilution (where complex tasks performed by tradesmen were divided up into simple tasks to be performed by unskilled labour) and the introduction of female labour in the moulding trade. These measures were actively pursued by the government in an attempt to overcome manpower shortages caused by the enlistment of men into the armed forces and the rapidly increasing demand for industrial production. In 1944 20 moulders at the Perry Engineering Company in Adelaide stopped work over the employment of two women as coremakers. The dispute spread to 10 other workshops and lasted for several months before the Arbitration Court ordered the moulders to return to work (although the judge found that the company had unfairly exploited wartime regulations allowing female labour in order to undermine the workplace conditions of the tradesmen moulders). In the same year the union voted overwhelmingly to refuse membership to female coremakers employed at Metters Limited, on the basis that it could lead to reductions in the basic pay rate for male moulders. The women workers, whose original employment had been disputed by the metal trades unions, instead became members of the Amalgamated Engineering Union (AEU).

Shortly after the war the FMMUA played a prominent role in the 1946–47 Victorian Metal Trades Strike, led by the AEU, which culminated in November 1946 in a lockout of 20,000 Victorian foundry workers by employers. Following protracted proceedings in the arbitration courts, the dispute was finally settled when workers agreed to return to work in exchange for an increase of 16 shillings in the base tradesmen's rate under the Federal Metal Trades Award (with equivalent increases for other classifications) and amendment of federal wage-pegging regulations. This increase later flowed on to workers employed under the various state metal trades awards.

=== 1950s - 1970s: Decline ===
By the 1950s the FMMUA had approximately 7000 members, but was faced with a declining membership base as technological advances in foundries further reduced the need for tradesmen moulders. The union, therefore, argued against government initiatives to allow semi-skilled adult workers to train beyond the level of machine moulding.

After a major dispute in 1970, in which all moulders in Victoria were on strike for a period of five weeks, the Victorian branch of the union established a special committee with the Metal Trades Industry Association and the Country Founders Group to try and improve industrial relations in the industry. The industrial relations committee was highly successful, and time lost due to stoppages fell from approximately two to three weeks per member per annum to less than 24 hours per member after its creation. This model of industrial relations committees in the moulding trade of later spread to other states including South Australia and New South Wales.

Nevertheless, the union's membership continued to decline into the 1970s as automation and the decline of heavy industry due to tariff reduction shrank the workforce in foundries. The union was heavily involved in advocating for government support for the industry, including submissions to the Tariff Board, albeit with little success, and by 1973 membership had fallen to 4,000.

The FMMUA was heavily involved in the campaign to secure a 35-hour working week in the Australian metal industry during the 1970s and 80s. The union was also active in opposing the penal clauses of the Commonwealth Conciliation and Arbitration Act, and refused to pay fines imposed on it for undertaking strikes.

During the early 1970s the NSW, Victorian and Queensland branches of the FMMUA supported the Moratorium Movement in opposition to Australia's involvement in the Vietnam War. In general, the union's political inclinations varied between states, with the Queensland branch closely associated with the Communist Party of Australia, while the Western Australian branch was regarded as relatively conservative.

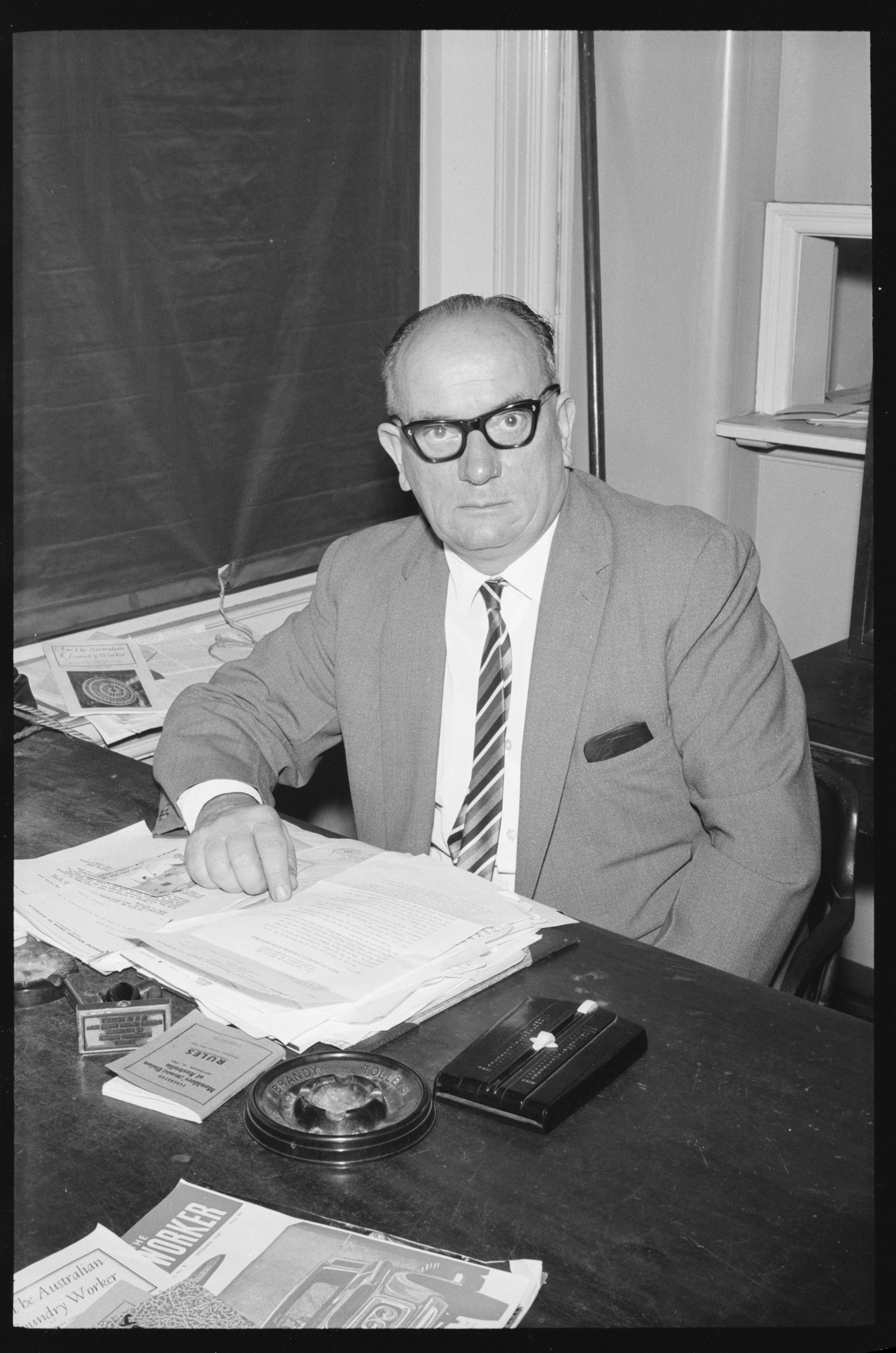
Ralph Spooner, NSW state secretary of the FMMUA, ca. 1964–5.

=== Amalgamation ===
As early as 1922 the moulders' union had participated in discussions with a view to forming one single union in the metal trade, without success. In September 1944 the federal council of the FMMUA announced its preparedness to "federated or amalgamate with any union or unions in the metal trades industry" and endorsed a proposal for amalgamation with the FIA; however, the proposal was rejected by a ballot of the moulders' union membership by 2,173 to 1,533. In the late 1960s the FMMUA participated in discussions with the AEU, the Boilermakers and Blacksmiths Society of Australia and the Sheet Metal Working Industrial Union regarding amalgamation. While the other three unions eventually merged in 1972 to form the Amalgamated Metal Workers Union, the moulders elected to remain independent. During the late 1970s the FMMUA again considered amalgamation with the FIA, but the proposal was rejected by a plebiscite of the membership.

During the 1970s the Western Australian branch of the FMMUA split off in order to merge with the local branch of the Australian Society of Engineers, forming the Australasian Society of Engineers, Moulders and Foundry Workers, while in December 1980 the South Australian branch also seceded to form the Metal Moulders Union of South Australia before amalgamating with the Adelaide Branch of the FIA to form its Moulders and Foundry Workers Sub-Branch in 1982.

Following protracted negotiations during 1980–83, including opposition from some of the moulders' state branches, the FMMUA finally merged with the Amalgamated Metal Workers and Shipwrights Union (AMWSU) to form the Amalgamated Metals, Foundry and Shipwrights' Union in February 1983.
