= FMU =

FMU can refer to:

== Universities ==
- Faisalabad Medical University, in Faisalabad, Punjab, Pakistan
- Fakir Mohan University, in Balasore, Odisha, India
- Florida Memorial University, in Miami, Florida, United States
- Florida Metropolitan University, now Everest University
- Francis Marion University, in Florence, South Carolina, United States
- Fukushima Medical University, in Japan

== Other uses ==
- 16S rRNA (cytosine967-C5)-methyltransferase
- Federated Moulders' (Metals) Union of Australia, now defunct
- Financial Monitoring Unit, an agency of the government of Pakistan
- Florence Municipal Airport, in Oregon, United States
- Freight multiple unit
- Functional Mock-up Unit, a library representing a simulation model, also the file extension ".fmu" containing model data
- Muria language (ISO code fmu)
- "FMU" (song), by Brooke Candy featuring Rico Nasty from the album Sexorcism
