= Boilermakers Union =

Boilermakers Union can refer to:

- Amalgamated Society of Boilermakers, Shipwrights, Blacksmiths and Structural Workers, a defunct trade union in the United Kingdom
- Boilermakers' Society of Australia, a defunct trade union in Australia
- Boilermakers and Blacksmiths Society of Australia, a defunct trade union in Australia
- GMB (trade union), a trade union in the United Kingdom
- International Brotherhood of Boilermakers, Iron Ship Builders, Blacksmiths, Forgers and Helpers, a trade union in the United States of America

== See also ==
- Boilermaking
