= Blacksmiths' Society of Australia =

Australian trade union (1911–1965)

The Blacksmiths' Society of Australia was an Australian trade union which existed from 1911 to 1965.

It was established in late 1911 as a federation of pre-existing state unions under the name of the Blacksmiths' Society of Australasia. The federation occurred amidst bitter demarcation tensions with the Australian Society of Engineers, which saw the ASE successfully oppose the BSA's NSW state registration in a succession of legal battles from their first attempt in May 1912 until 1918 on the basis that the already-registered ASE was capable of representing the BSA's members. By May 1918, however, the deciding judge held that the BSA's case for independent recognition had been made out, only refusing on the basis that the BSA had participated in the 1917 Australian general strike, which would have seen them deregistered if they had been registered to begin with. They were finally successful in obtaining NSW registration in August 1918, and then federal registration in December 1919.

The union was renamed the Blacksmiths Society of Australia in 1954.

It amalgamated with the Boilermakers' Society of Australia in 1965 to form the Boilermakers and Blacksmiths Society of Australia.
