= Association of Draughting, Supervisory and Technical Employees =

Australian trade union

ADSTE
- Association of Draughting, Supervisory and Technical Employees
- Merged into: Metals and Engineering Workers' Union
- Founded: August 1915
- Dissolved: 1991
- Headquarters: Mitchell House Annexe, 358 Lonsdale Street, Melbourne
- Location: Australia
- Members: 21,800 (1987)
- Publication: Blueprint
- Affiliations: ACTU, Metal Trades Federation, CAGEO, ACSPA

The Association of Draughting Supervisory and Technical Employees (ADSTE), originally known as the Association of Architects, Engineers, Surveyors and Draughtsmen of Australia (AAESDA), was an Australian trade union which existed between 1915 and 1991. It represented white collar and technical-grade employees in both the private sector and the public service.

== History ==
=== Foundation ===
The union was founded in Brisbane in August 1915 with a membership of 108. The union initially represented white collar employees in the Queensland Railways workshops, but soon expanded to cover engineers employed in the Queensland Public Service and local government engineering offices, as well as architects in the Public Works Department and Department of Public Lands. After unsuccessfully seeking federal registration, the union was registered with the Industrial Court of Queensland on 11 April 1917 as the Australian Union of Architects, Engineers and Surveyors, Union of Employees, Queensland. During this period the union's membership was concentrated mainly in Brisbane and Ipswich. The union grew slowly over the following decades, reaching 243 members by 1933 and 528 by 1939.

=== Growth ===
The union grew rapidly during World War II, due to the increased demand for employees with technical expertise, many of them promoted from trades positions, and by 1941 the union's membership had reached 1,793. In 1943 the union extended its industrial remit to provide for coverage of draughtsmen. In 1944, with branches in Victoria and New South Wales, the union achieved federal registration as the Association of Architects, Engineers, Surveyors and Draughtsmen of Australia (AAESDA). Its acronym would lead it to be affectionately nicknamed the 'Alphabetical Association'. The first annual meeting of the new Federal Council of the AAESDA was held in December 1945 and it was decided to move the union's head office from Queensland to Melbourne, where it would remain for the rest of the union's history – mainly due to the fact that the Victorian state branch had the largest membership in the union. In the same year the AAESDA merged with the Commonwealth Temporary Technical Officers' Association, formed two years earlier by government technicians in war-time service, based in Sydney.

In September 1947 the AAESDA merged with the Australian Association of Draughtsmen (AAD), after almost three years of negotiations. The AAD had been formed in Sydney in June 1942 by draughtsmen at several major engineering firms, including Cockatoo Dockyard, Babcock & Wilcox and Clyde Engineering, who were frustrated at the low wages in draughting, resulting from its status as a reserved occupation. Like the AAESDA, the AAD had benefited from war-time industrial activity through a growing membership, quickly expanding to other states and achieving federal registration in October 1943. The AAD had initially opposed the federal registration of the AAESDA, on the grounds that the two organisations would compete for coverage of the same employees.

The AAESDA continued to grow in the post-war years, as a result of rapid economic expansion and industrialisation. Between 1959 and 1964 it averaged over 13% annual growth in membership, and by 1965 had reached 12,738 members, of whom 7322 were employed in the private sector. Membership peaked ten years later, with a total of 24,296 members.

=== Affiliation and change ===
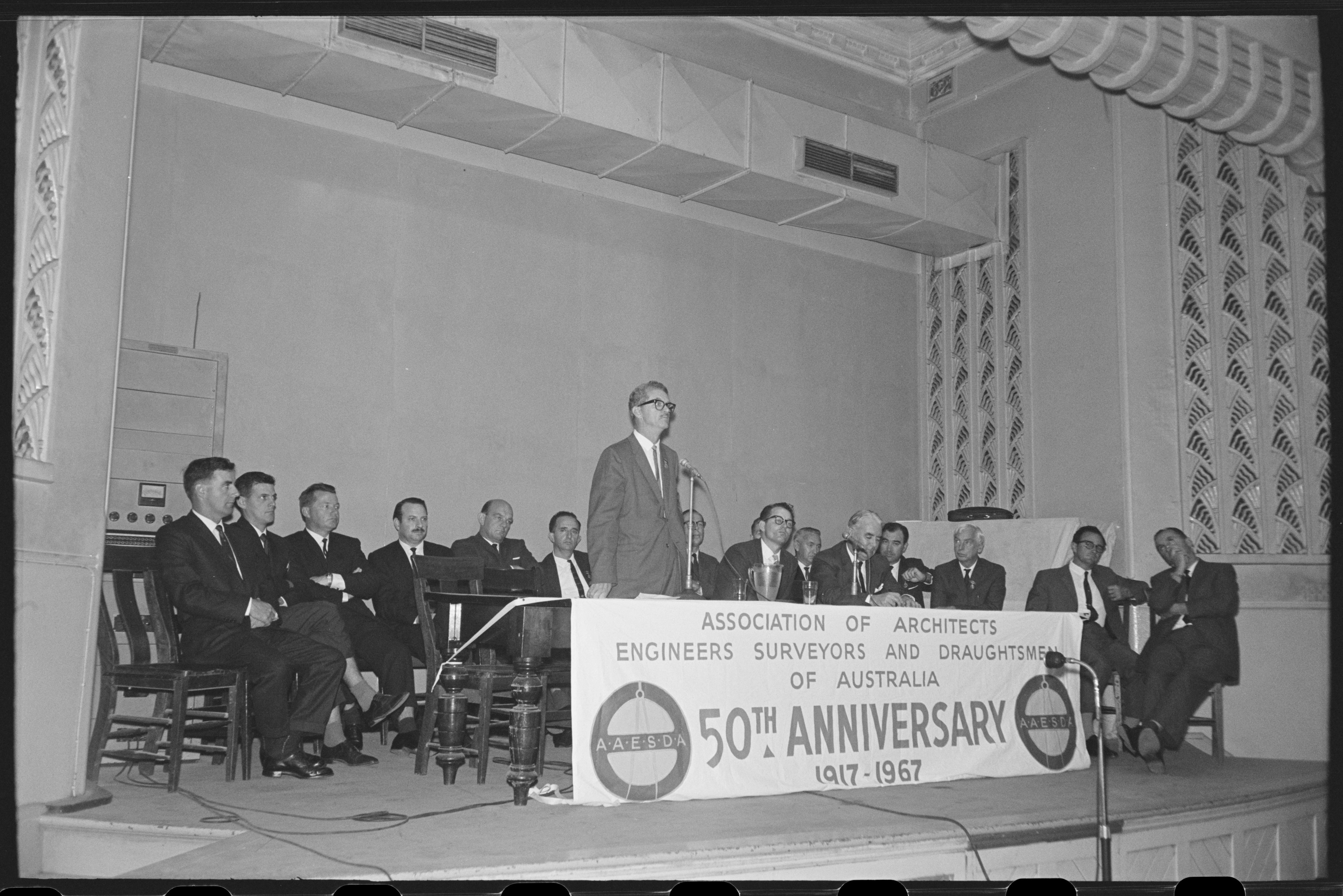
Fiftieth anniversary meeting of the AAESDA, held in Sydney Trades Hall auditorium, April 1967

During the early 1950s a plebiscite of the association's members was held to decide whether to affiliate to the Australian Council of Trade Unions (ACTU), but the proposal was strongly rejected by the membership. The AAESDA later played a key role in the 1956 establishment of the Australian Council of Salaried and Professional Associations (ACSPA), the peak body for unions and professional associations representing white-collar or salaried employees. The AAESDA's federal president, Paul Allsop, became the first president of ACSPA. Despite being a founding member, the AAESDA was regarded as unusual within ACSPA due to its industrial militancy, relative to the other affiliates, including being prepared to use strike action as a bargaining tool with management. The union remained affiliated with ACSPA until 1977, when, having become disillusioned with the slow progress of negotiations to merge ACSPA with the ACTU, it transferred its affiliation to the ACTU. This move was met with opposition from some sections of the union's membership, unhappy with the AAESDA being affiliated with a body traditionally associated with blue-collar workers. Shortly after, ACSPA merged into the ACTU in 1979.

In 1970 the AAESDA affiliated to the Council of Commonwealth Public Service Organisations (CCPSO), the representative body for unions representing workers employed by the Commonwealth Government, later renamed the Council of Australian Government Employee Organisations (CAGEO) in 1974. Earlier attempts to affiliate with the CCPSO had been rejected, due to the AAESDA's sizeable private sector membership. The union would remain affiliated until 1981, when CAGEO merged into the ACTU.

During the 1950s and 60s the AAESDA was heavily involved in the design and development of technical education courses to train and qualify employees in the expanding technical fields, which fell outside the traditional apprenticeship or university systems. Unlike many of the traditional craft unions, the AAESDA did not attempt to restrict or regulate entry into the occupations it covered, but rather encouraged its members to gain recognised qualifications to help formalise the position of technical workers in the structure of the award system.

In 1978 the AAESDA applied to the Commonwealth Conciliation and Arbitration Commission to include coverage of foremen and supervisors in the Metal Industry Award. This application was opposed by employers, who argued that it would create "divided loyalties" among staff employees, and undermine their "management ethic". The application was granted by the Commission, with the proviso that supervisors should be represented by a different organisation to the workers they supervised.

In the 1970s the AAESDA, like many other Australian unions, became more industrially militant, including being more prepared to undertake strikes and other industrial action. The union's membership was also undergoing a change as fields such as architecture and engineering became increasingly professionalised, requiring university-level qualifications, and many employees in these occupations chose to be represented by occupation-specific professional associations such as the newly formed Australian Professional Engineers Association (APEA). By 1979 technicians accounted for 48 per cent of the AAESDA's membership; draughtsmen, 31 per cent; and supervisors, 18 per cent – architects, engineers and surveyors collectively made up less than 3 per cent of the union. To better reflect this new membership profile the union changed its name in 1981 to the Association of Draughting Supervisory and Technical Employees (ADSTE).

=== Amalgamation ===
In the late 1970s and 80s technological change (such as the introduction of Computer-aided design in draughting), outsourcing in the public service and the decline of the Australian manufacturing industry began to put pressure on the AAESDA and between 1975 and 1980 it lost over 17 percent of its membership nationally, falling to 20,049. To offset these losses the union sought to amalgamate with other unions. In 1971 it had taken over members from the deregistered Federation of Scientific and Technical Workers, and in 1986 it amalgamated with the Australian Public Service Artisans' Association, which represented approximately 2200 permanent trades employees of the Federal Government. Unsuccessful attempts were also made to amalgamate with the CSIRO Technical Association and the Supervisory Technicians' Association. In 1970 the AAESDA began talks with the Amalgamated Engineering Union (AEU), which had a broad membership among blue-collar workers in manufacturing, however there was a strong backlash from the membership, who resisted the loss of their union's distinct identity.

Driven by the union's financial difficulties, these talks were restarted in 1984 with the successor to the AEU, the Amalgamated Metal Workers' Union (AMWU). The two unions shared a number of industrial awards in common and approximately 90 percent of ADSTE members were employed in workplaces that also had AMWU members. The amalgamation proposal was initially opposed by ADSTE's West Australian, Tasmanian and Australian Capital Territory (ACT) branches. While the West Australian and Tasmanian branches were eventually persuaded to change their position, the ACT branch led a campaign to oppose the merger. The amalgamation was finally completed on 1 April 1991, after a referendum in which 60% of participating ADSTE members voted to support the amalgamation proposal. The merged organisation was named the Metals and Engineering Workers' Union (MEWU) and had a total of 167,500 members. The membership previously represented by ADSTE became the 'Technical and Supervisory Division' of the MEWU. Immediately following the merger the Division lost a significant proportion of its members, with approximately 40 percent of former ADSTE members choosing not to continue membership in the amalgamated body.

== Organisation ==
=== Membership ===
Unlike many other white collar unions in Australia ADSTE did not include managerial-level or administrative employees and many of its members were former tradespeople (60% in 1991) who had been promoted to more highly skilled positions. Typical occupations included draughtsmen, engineering technicians, technical officers, production planners, laboratory technicians, supervisors and foremen. In private industry its members were concentrated primarily in the vehicle, metal and aircraft industries. Due to the makeup of the occupations it covered the union was almost exclusively male – for example, female members made up only 1.6 percent of the South Australian state branch in 1981. In 1970 less than three percent of the association's approximately 20,000 members were women. The union's membership was widely dispersed throughout a variety of industries and occupations, and it was rare to have more than five members employed in a single workplace – often making union organisation a challenging task.

=== Structure ===
The union was organised into eight state and territory branches, which each paid 32 percent of their income to the federal office. Each state branch was governed by a branch council, consisting of workplace and sub-branch delegates, a president, two vice-presidents, treasurer, secretary and delegates to the union's federal conference. All state branch officials were elected annually by the union's rank-and-file membership, except for the state secretary, who served for four years. The union held an annual Federal Conference, made up of elected delegates from each state branch, and a Federal Secretary and Assistant Federal Secretary (elected every four years by the national membership of the union), which decided policy and direction for the union nationally.

The union was politically-unaligned, and the membership actively resisted the attempts of some officials to encourage affiliation with the Australian Labor Party (a common practice among Australian unions) during the early 1970s. This was again the case when in 1984 the ADSTE Federal Conference rejected a motion, supported by the union's officials, to allow the union to financially or publicly support political parties.

The union published a monthly journal known as the AAESDA Bulletin (first appearing in June 1948) and later simply as Blueprint.
