= Laurie Carmichael =

Australian Trade Unionist

- Born: Laurence Norman Richard ‘Laurie’ Carmichael; 17 April 1925
- Died: 18 August 2018 (aged 93)
- Occupation: Trade unionist

Laurence Norman Richard ‘Laurie’ Carmichael (17 April 1925 - 18 August 2018) was a prominent Australian trade unionist. He served as Victorian State Secretary of the Amalgamated Engineering Union (AEU), Assistant National Secretary of the Amalgamated Metal Workers Union (AMWU), and Assistant Secretary of the Australian Council of Trade Unions (ACTU). He was also a prominent member of the Communist Party of Australia (CPA), serving as National President from 1978 to 1981.

Carmichael played a central role in the drafting and implementation of the Prices and Incomes Accord between the ACTU and the Australian Labor Party (ALP). He was also a significant leader in several important social movements and trade union campaigns, including the Moratorium to End the War in Vietnam, the 1969 general strike, and the campaign for shorter working hours.

In 2020, the Centre for Future Work at The Australia Institute announced the creation of the Carmichael Centre.
