= Jim Toohey (politician) =

Australian politician (1909–1992)

Jim Toohey AM
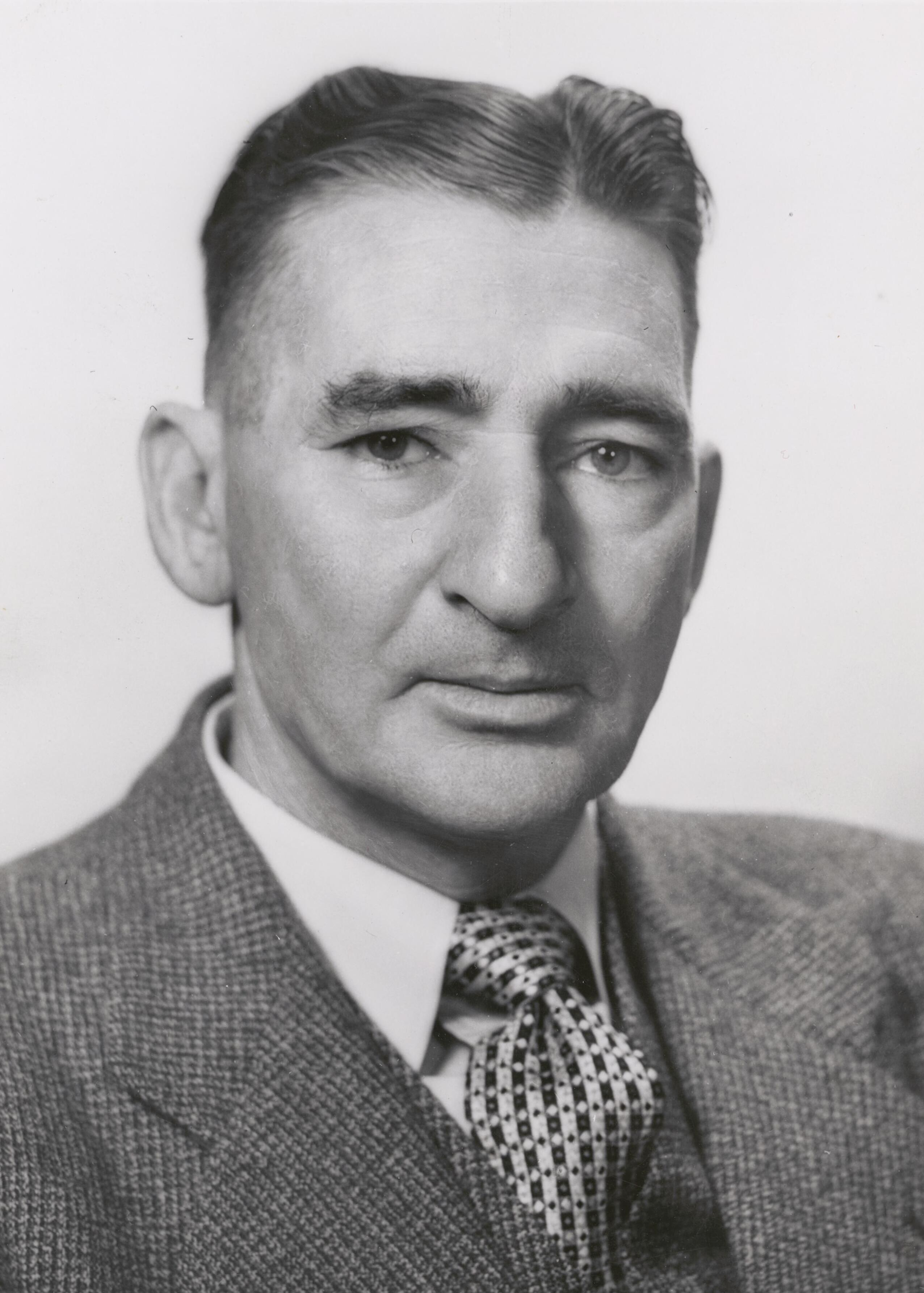
- Toohey in 1956

Senator for South Australia
- In office 1 July 1953 – 30 June 1971

Personal details
- Born: 11 July 1909 Rose Park, South Australia
- Died: 18 August 1992 (aged 83) Henley Beach, South Australia
- Party: Labor
- Spouse: Margaret Griffin (m. 1937)
- Occupation: Factory worker

James Philip Toohey AM (11 July 1909 – 18 August 1992) was an Australian politician and trade unionist. He was a member of the Australian Labor Party (ALP) and served as a Senator for South Australia from 1953 to 1971. He was an influential figure in the party's South Australian branch and also in the powerful Vehicle Builders' Employees' Federation.

== Early life ==
Toohey was born on 11 July 1909 in Rose Park, South Australia. He was the son of Lilian (née Morgan) and James Patrick Toohey. His father worked as a builder's labourer.

Toohey was raised in Adelaide's western suburbs, attending both state schools and Catholic schools. He left school at the age of fourteen as his family could not afford to support his further education. He worked for periods at the factories of Holden & Frost Ltd, Harris, Scarfe, Ltd., and Scott Bonnar & Co., then took up an apprenticeship as a joiner with Baldock & Sons. He experienced a period of unemployment during the Great Depression, but by the 1930s was working for coachbuilding firm T. J. Richards & Sons. He later joined its primary customer General Motors-Holden's Ltd.

== Labour movement ==
Toohey was active in the labour movement from a young age. He joined the Vehicle Builders' Employees' Federation (VBEF) and gained prominence as a shop steward for leading industrial action to protest against time and motion studies. He was elected assistant state secretary of the VBEF in 1944 and became a paid organiser.

== Politics ==
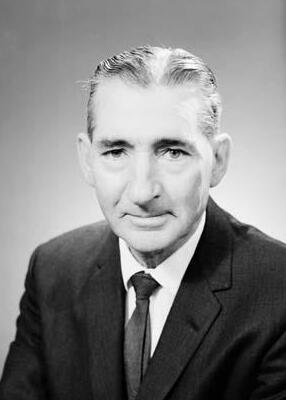
Toohey in 1964

Toohey joined the Australian Labor Party in 1927 and served for periods as secretary of the Keswick sub-branch and chairman of the Richmond sub-branch.

=== Senate career ===
At the 1953 Senate election, Toohey was elected to a six-year term beginning on 1 July 1953. He was re-elected at the 1958 and 1964 elections, retiring at the expiry of his term on 30 June 1971 after choosing not to contest the 1970 election.

== Personal life ==
Toohey married Margaret Griffin in 1937; there were no children of the marriage. He retired to his home at West Beach and later moved to a retirement village at West Lakes. He died on 18 August 1992 at Western Community Hospital in Henley Beach.
