= Boilermakers' Society of Australia =

Former trade union in Australia

- Formation: 1937
- Location: Australia

The Boilermakers' Society of Australia was a trade union in Australia which existed from 1911 until 1965.

It was established as the Federated Society of Boilermakers & Iron Shipbuilders of Australia in 1911, operating as a federation of pre-existing state unions. The union attained federal registration on 30 November 1911.

The union had an early dispute with the Federated Ironworkers' Association of Australia before it had even attained federal registration, unsuccessfully opposing the Ironworkers' registration by arguing that the Boilermakers' in fact represented more iron workers and citing concerns that the Ironworkers' registration might prevent other iron workers' unions, including their own, from registering. It did, however, obtain a condition that no mechanic who was eligible to join the Boilermakers' Society could join the Ironworkers' Association.

The union was renamed the Federated Society of Boilermakers, Iron Shipbuilders & Structural Iron & Steel Workers of Australia in 1929 and again to the Boilermakers Society of Australia in 1937.

In 1956, the union challenged a punitive decision from the Commonwealth Court of Conciliation and Arbitration in the High Court of Australia in the case of R v Kirby; Ex parte Boilermakers' Society of Australia. The union won, resulting in the powers of the Commonwealth Court of Conciliation and Arbitration being found to be unconstitutional and the subsequent abolition and replacement of the Court, in a particularly important case for the determination of the separation of powers in Australia.

It merged with the Blacksmiths' Society of Australia in 1965 to form the Boilermakers and Blacksmiths Society of Australia.

== See also ==
- Boilermaking
