= Laurie Short =

Australian trade unionist

Laurence Elwyn Short AO OBE (15 December 1915 – 24 March 2009) was an Australian trade union leader and leading figure in the Australian Labor Party (ALP). Short was the national secretary of the Federated Ironworkers' Association (FIA), now part of the Australian Workers' Union, from 1951 to 1982.

== Biography ==
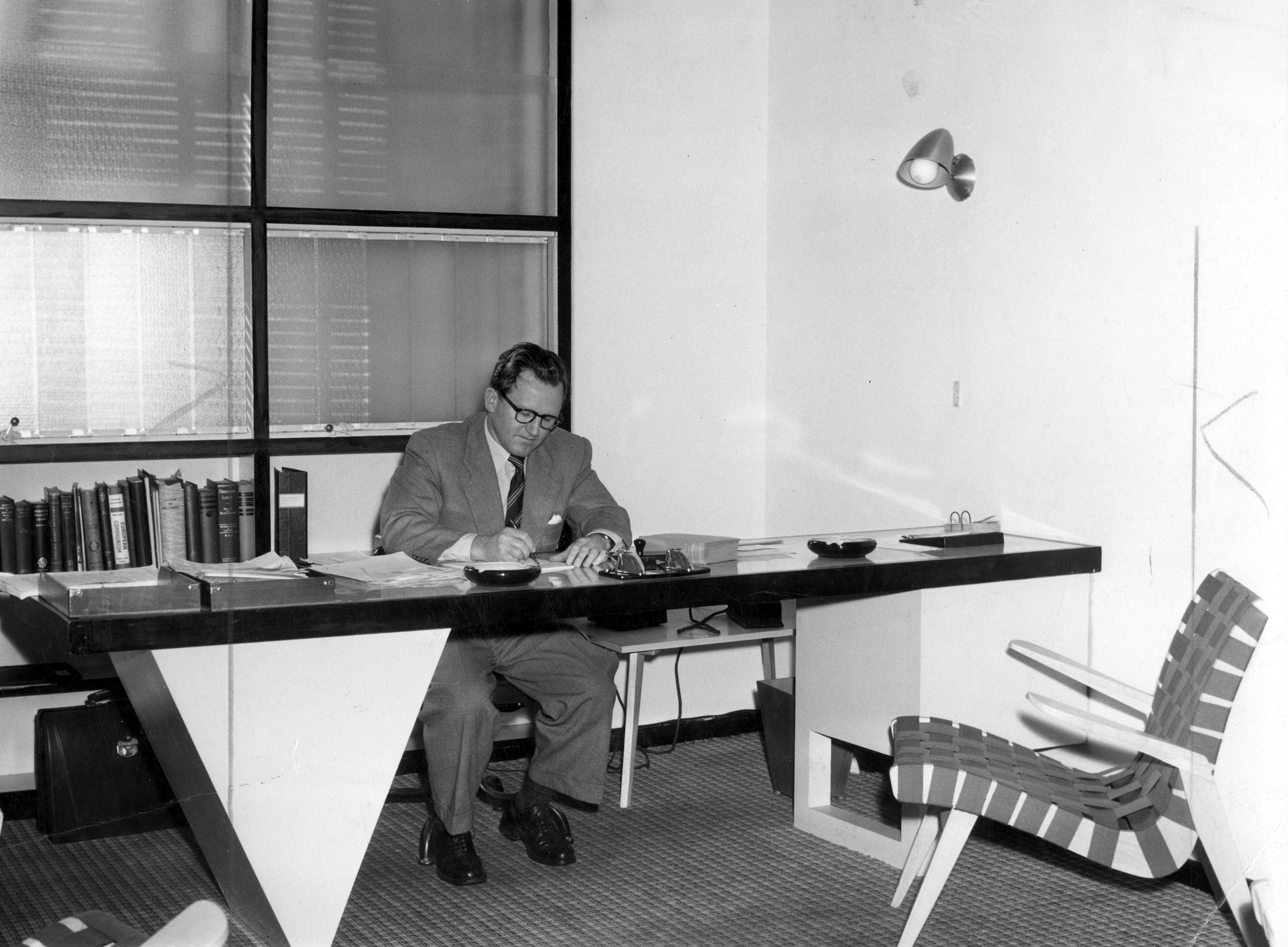
Short in his office, circa 1953.

Short at first supported the idea of communism in Australia, but then rejected communism and then was an important anti-communist union leader. Short ran against Ernest "Ernie" Thornton, a member of the Communist Party of Australia, in the 1949 FIA elections — Thornton at first claimed victory, but later his election was ruled invalid, and Short declared the winner. Short was a non-Catholic ally of B. A. Santamaria's Catholic Social Studies Movement, but was seen as playing a key role in preventing the New South Wales branch of the ALP from splitting along sectarian lines in the Australian Labor Party split of 1955.

== Honours ==
He was made an Officer of the Order of the British Empire (OBE) in 1971 by John Gorton's Liberal-Country Party Government, and this was followed in 1980 by his appointment as an Officer of the Order of Australia (AO) by Malcolm Fraser.

== Personal life ==
He married artist Nancy Borlase in 1941 and was father to journalist Susanna Short. Nancy died in 2002.
