= Australian Manufacturing Workers Union =

Trade union in Australia

AMWU
- Automotive, Food, Metals, Engineering, Printing and Kindred Industries Union
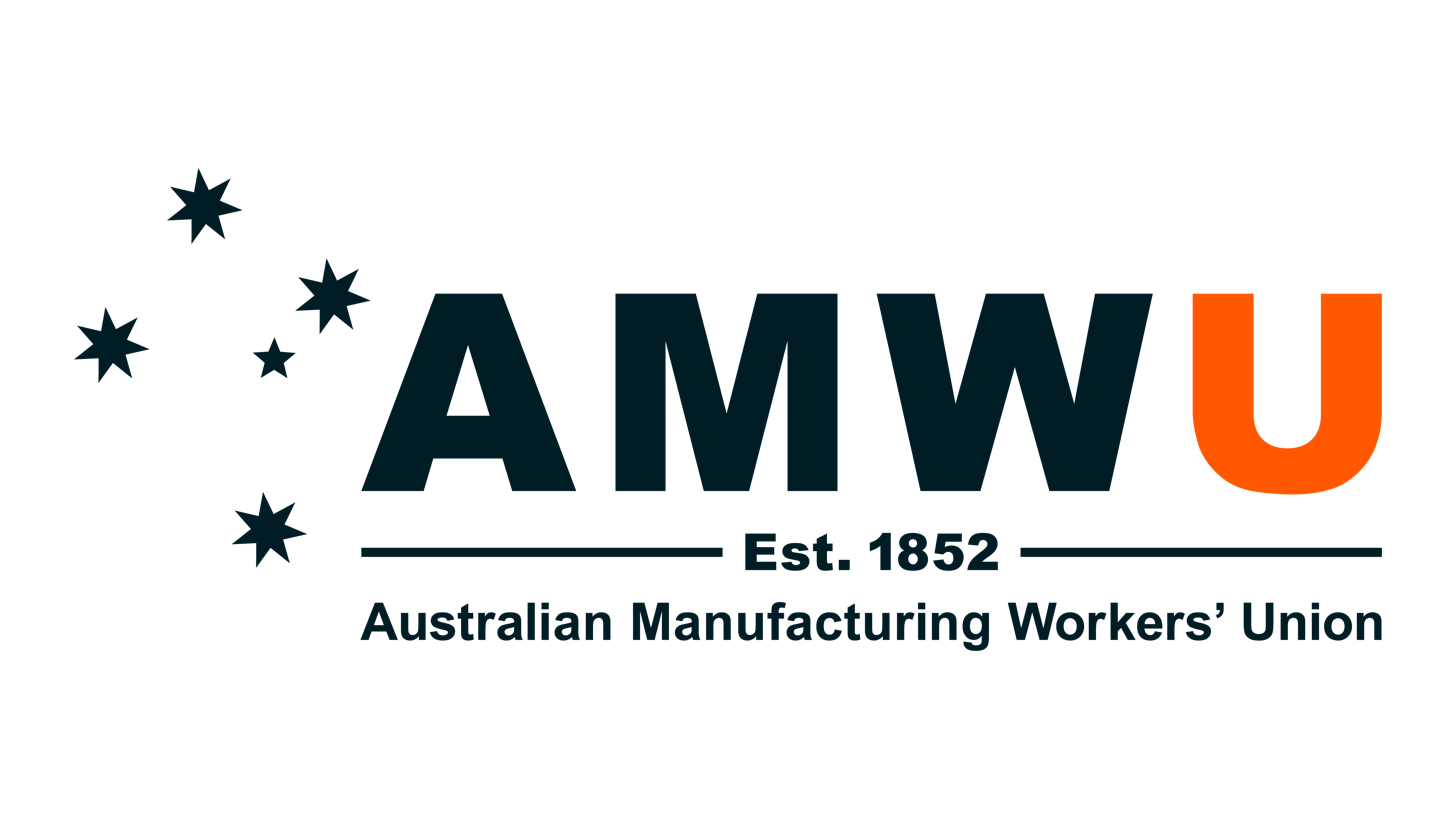
- Founded: 1852
- Headquarters: 133 Parramatta Rd, Granville, New South Wales
- Location: Australia
- Members: ▲55,703 (as at 31 December 2024)
- Key people: Steve Murphy, National Secretary
- Affiliations: ACTU, IndustriALL, ALP
- Website: www.amwu.org.au

The Australian Manufacturing Workers Union (AMWU), officially registered as the Automotive, Food, Metals, Engineering, Printing, and Kindred Industries Union, is the oldest trade union in Australia established in 1852 as a branch of the Amalgamated Society of Engineers. The AMWU represents a broad range of workers in the manufacturing and industrial sectors, and is affiliated with the Australian Council of Trade Unions as well as the Australian Labor Party.

The AMWU is federally organised into six state branches. Members in the Australian Capital Territory are covered under the New South Wales branch, while members in the Northern Territory are covered under the Queensland branch. Each state branch has its own sub-committee, and there is also an executive committee at the national level.

== History ==
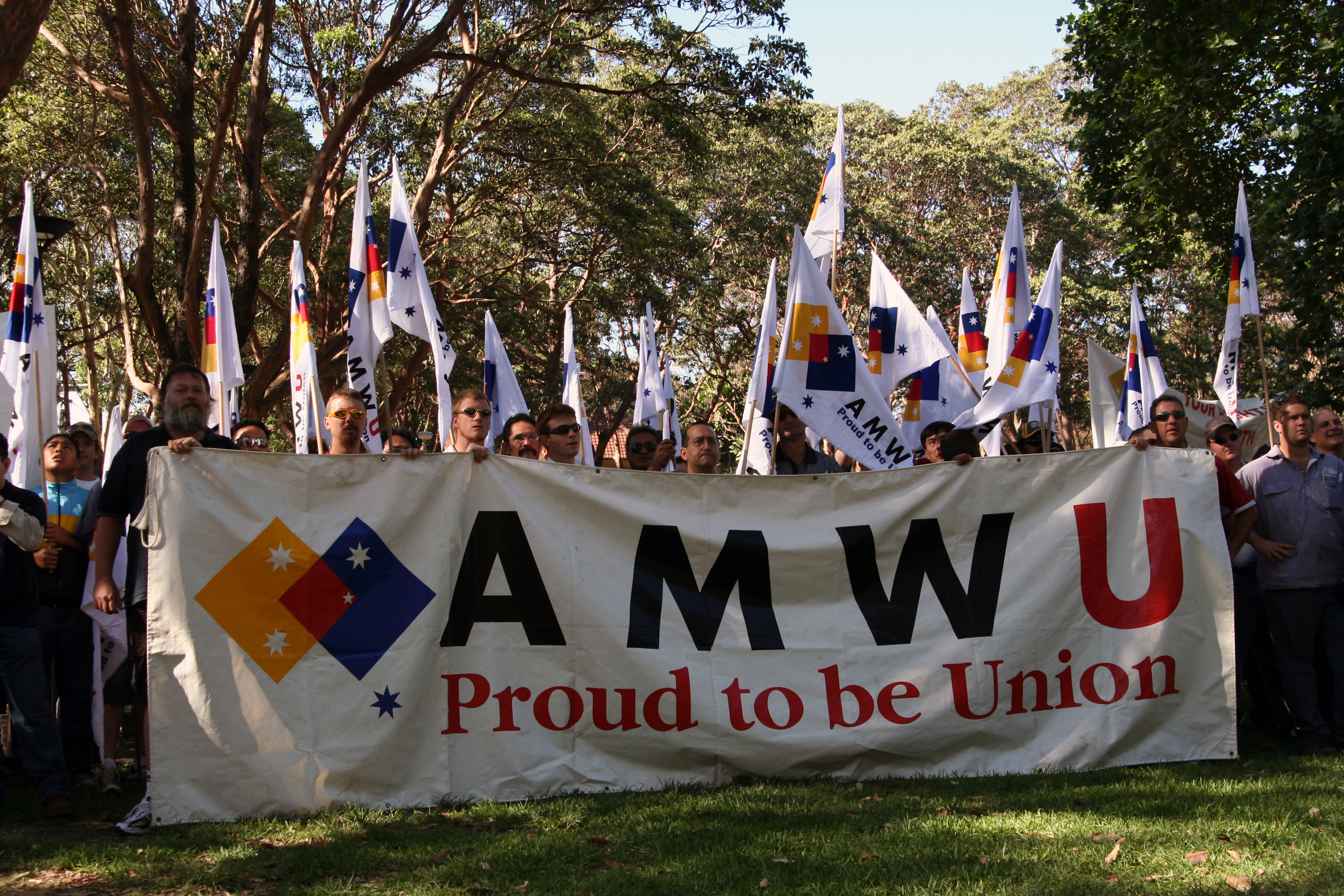
AMWU members protest then-Prime Minister John Howard's IR reforms

The Amalgamated Metal Workers Union (AMWU) was formed in 1972 with the amalgamation of three metal trade unions: the Boilermakers and Blacksmiths Society of Australia (BBS), the Sheet Metal Working Industrial Union of Australia (SMWU), and the Amalgamated Engineering Union (AEU). At its formation, the AMWU had a membership of 171,000, making it the largest organisation in Australia by membership.

In 1979, the Federated Shipwrights and Ship Constructors Union of Australia amalgamated with the AMWU, which changed its name to the Amalgamated Metal Workers and Shipwrights Union (AMWSU). When the Federated Moulders’ (Metals) Union amalgamated in 1983, the union's name changed slightly to the Amalgamated Metals Foundry & Shipwrights’ Union, but in 1985 it reverted to being the Amalgamated Metal Workers’ Union. By 1987, the union's membership had declined slightly to 163,400.

During the 1980s, the AMWU played a pivotal role in securing the support of the left wing of the Australian union movement for the Prices and Incomes Accord, which involved unions agreeing to restrict their demands for wage increases in exchange for the federal government implementing policies to advance the 'social wage', including universal health insurance, investment in education, and social welfare.

In 1991, the AMWU amalgamated with the Association of Draughting Supervisory & Technical Employees (ADSTE) to create the Metals and Engineering Workers’ Union. Two years later, a further amalgamation with the Vehicle Builders Employees’ Federation of Australia resulted in the Automotive Metals & Engineering Union. In 1994, the union merged with the Confectionery Workers' and Food Preservers' Union, itself a recent amalgamation of the Food Preservers' Union of Australia and the Confectionery Workers' Union of Australia, to form the Automotive Food Metals and Engineering Union. Finally, the Printing and Kindred Industries Union amalgamated to form the printing division of the Automotive, Food, Metals, Engineering, Printing, and Kindred Industries Union.

During the 1990s and 2000s, membership of the AMWU declined dramatically, reflecting the rapid decline of the manufacturing sector in Australia, falling from 200,000 in 1995 to 157,000 in 2005. Losses then accelerated, with membership more than halving over the following decade to 68,008 in 2017.

== National Secretaries ==
1973: Jack Garland
1981: Jack Kidd
1988: George Campbell
1996: Doug Cameron
2008: Dave Oliver
2012: Paul Bastian
2020: Steve Murphy

== State Secretaries ==
South Australia: Stuart Gordon (since 2024)
Western Australia: Steve McCartney (since 2000)
Tasmania: Jacob Batt (since 2024)
New South Wales & ACT: Brad Pidgeon (since 2024)
Queensland & NT: Rowan Webb (since 2012)
Victoria: Tony Mavromatis (since 2018)

== Political Activity ==
The AMWU is one of the most powerful and organised unions in the Labor Left faction of the Australian Labor Party.

The AMWU is a democratic socialist organisation. During the twentieth century, communists like Laurie Carmichael were elected to leadership positions.

The South Australian branch of the AMWU was previously affiliated with Labor Unity, but has been affiliated with Labor Left since 2019 after the collapse of the vehicle builders division as result of the collapse of Holden automotive manufacturing in 2017. Peter Bauer challenged then State Secretary John Camillo to a ballot for State Secretary and Assistant State Secretary, which Bauer ran on a ticket with now State Secretary Stuart Gordon. Camillo subsequently withdrew from the ballot citing his "diagnosis of colon cancer", but insists he could have won the ballot. Bauer thereafter withdrew from Labor Unity and affiliated with Labor Left bringing State Labor Convention delegate numbers to ~50-50 between the Left and Right Factions.

In WA, the AMWU allies with the United Workers Union in forming the majority left faction.

In 2023, the Victorian Branch of the AMWU hosted the Cuban ambassador and young Cuban activists.

In 2025 the National division of the AMWU started a campaign calling for the end of the Capital Gains Discount (CGT) and Negative Gearing and the creation of modular housing to be manufactured in Australia using union labor.

=== Community Politics and Activism ===
The West Australian Branch of the AMWU met with the Kimberley Land Council and its member language groups in the Kimberley at Lombadina to sign a historic regional framework agreement aimed at ensuring better outcomes for communities in the area. AMWU State Secretary Steve McCartney said "the agreement would provide for better outcomes for workers and traditional owners in the region by requiring union enterprise bargaining agreements with major employers to adopt the same principles as the KRFA."

In 2017 West Australian State Secretary Steve McCartney, David Templeman MP and AMWU Officials unveiled union support for the Peel Community Kitchen with an Initial Donation of $10,000, stating "The AMWU is proud to be associated with the Peel Community Kitchen. We are committed to supporting lifting standards for everyone and supporting our communities."

In 2016 the West Australian Branch donated $30,000 to MATES in Construction, the national not-for-profit group working towards ending suicide in the construction industry; saying “We’ve been working on long-term solutions for workplace mental health and wellbeing issues through Parliament and in industrial bargaining, but this is a way to complement that with positive action right now.”

In 2022 the Victorian AMWU Youth Committee hosted a screening of queer comedy drama film Pride (2014)

=== 2026 ALP National Conference ===
At the 2026 Australian Labor Party National Conference the AMWU launched a sweeping national advocacy plan titled "Housing Charter: Our Right to a Home" to prioritize workers over property investors within Australia's housing system. The charter demands immediate structural interventions in the housing market. The union argues that relying solely on market-driven private developers has failed, leaving the National Housing Accord significantly behind its construction targets.

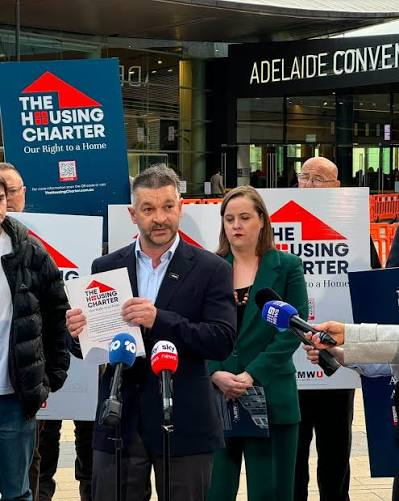
AMWU National Secretary Steve Murphy launching the Housing Charter outside ALP National Conference 2026

==== Core reforms ====
National Housing Commission: Establish a permanent public authority to directly plan, coordinate, and build housing at scale.

Taxation System Overhaul: Demands phasing out the 50% Capital Gains Tax (CGT) discount on investment properties and effectively ending negative gearing

Modular Housing Investment: Recommends redirecting the tax savings from investor concessions into scaling up Australia's domestic modular housing industry

Rent-to-Buy Transition: Proposes replacing the federal 5% home deposit scheme with a model enabling renters to allocate a portion of their rent toward property ownership

=== AMWU-Affiliated Members of Parliament ===
Multiple Labor politicians are affiliated with the AMWU. These include:

==== Western Australia (as of 2025) ====
Name	Seat	Other Position(s)	Ref.
Don Punch	MLA for Bunbury	Minister for Aboriginal Affairs, Minister for Water, Minister for Climate Resilience, and Minister for South West	
Mark Folkard	MLA for Mindarie		
David Scaife	MLA for Cockburn		
Jodie Hanns	MLA for Collie-Preston		
Yaz Mubarakai	MLA for Oakford		
Divina D'Anna	MLA for Kimberley		
Jessica Stojkovski	MLA for Kingsley	Minister for Child Protection, Minister for Prevention of Family and Domestic Violence, Minister Assisting the Minister for Transport, and Minister for Peel	
Rhys Williams	MLA for Mandurah		
Robyn Clarke	MLA for Murray-Wellington		
Kevin Michel	MLA for Pilbara		
Alanna Clohesy	MLC for East Metropolitan	President of the WA Legislative Council	
Stephen Dawson	MLC for Mining and Pastoral	Minister for Regional Development, Minister for Ports, Minister for Innovation and the Digital Economy, Minister for Science, Minister for Medical Research, and Minister for the Kimberley.	
Katrina Stratton	MLC for South West		

==== Queensland ====
Senior Queensland Labor Politician Shannon Fentiman is affiliated with the AMWU.

==== South Australia ====
Former fitter Hilton Gumbys is a Labor member of the Legislative Council, elected at the March 2026 State election.

Former MP Jon Gee was affiliated with the AMWU.

==== Federal Parliament ====
Name	Seat	Other notes	Ref.
Anthony Albanese	Member for Grayndler	Prime Minister	
Jenny McAllister	Senator for New South Wales	Minister for Disability and the National Disability Insurance Scheme	
Tim Ayres	Senator for New South Wales	Minister for Industry and Innovation; Minister for Science Former NSW State Secretary	
Ellie Whiteaker	Senator for Western Australia	Former AMWU Organiser	
Nita Green	Senator for Queensland	Former AMWU Organiser	
Anne Urquhart	Member for Braddon	Former Tasmanian AMWU State Secretary and Tasmanian Senator	
Basem Abdo	Member for Calwell		
Julie-Ann Campbell	Member for Moreton	Former AMWU Queensland branch Industrial Officer and Queensland Labor State Secretary	
Zaneta Mascarenhas	Member for Swan		
