= Vehicle Builders' Employees' Federation of Australia =

VBEF
- Vehicle Builders' Employees' Federation of Australia
- Merged into: Australian Manufacturing Workers Union
- Founded: 1863
- Dissolved: 1993
- Headquarters: 70 Drummond St, Carlton Victoria
- Location: Australia
- Members: 52,000 (1976)
- Affiliations: ALP, ACTU, International Metalworkers' Federation, Workers' Educational Association

The Vehicle Builders' Employees' Federation of Australia (VBEF) was an Australian trade union which existed between 1863 and 1993. It was an industrial union which represented all production employees in the vehicle industry and automotive parts manufacturing industry.

== History ==
In the late nineteenth century a number of small unions were formed in the Australian colonies to represent skilled coachbuilders in the horse-drawn coach building industry. In NSW a union of coachbuilders was formed in Bathurst in 1863, while a South Australian union was formed in the 1880s, before folding in 1896 due to lack of members. In 1917 the Australian Coach, Motor Car, Tram Car, Waggon Builders, Wheelwrights' and Rolling Stock Makers' Employees' Federation was registered federally. During the 1920s the union's membership was transformed as motor cars replaced coaches and carriages, and assembly line methods of production replaced trade-qualified coachbuilders with unskilled or semi-skilled assembly workers. In 1930 it reregistered under the even more cumbersome name of the Australian Coach, Motor Car, Tram Car, Waggon Builders, Wheelwrights' and Air Craft Rolling Stock Makers' Employees’ Federation. In 1938 it changed its name to the much simpler Vehicle Builders Employees' Federation.

The union grew rapidly after WWII, due to the growth in the Australian car industry, reaching approximately 30,000 members by the early 1960s. Many of these new members were recent migrants from Europe, termed New Australians, who could easily find unskilled work in the large car assembly plants despite limited English. In 1993 the VBEF merged with the Metals and Engineering Workers Union to form the Automotive Metals & Engineering Union.

== Political associations ==
The VBEF was especially influential in the South Australian Labor Party during the 20th century, in line with the role of the motor vehicle industry in the state's economy. It succeeded in placing a number of its officials on the party's Senate tickets, including Alex Finlay, Dominic Foreman, Jim Toohey and Clem Ridley.
