= Hilton Gumbys =

Australian politician

The Honourable Hilton Gumbys MLC
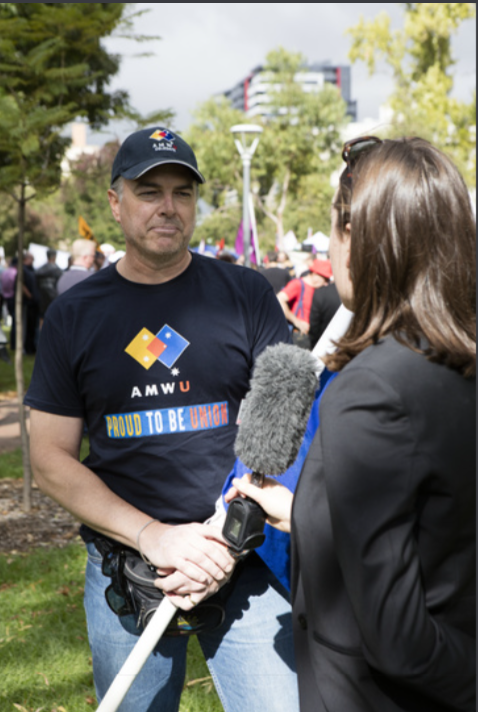
- Gumbys in 2018

Member of the South Australian Legislative Council
- Incumbent
- Assumed office 21 March 2026

Personal details
- Born: Hilton Jonas Gumbys; 5 August 1969 (age 57) Darwin, Northern Territory, Australia
- Party: Labor
- Occupation: Machinist; politician; trade unionist
- Website: hiltongumbysmlc.com.au

Hilton Jonas Gumbys (born 5 August 1969) is an Australian politician and trade unionist who has sat as a member of the South Australian Legislative Council since 2026. He is a member of the South Australian Labor Party and the Australian Manufacturing Workers Union.

== Early life ==
Gumbys was born in Darwin but grew up in the Adelaide suburb of Dernancourt. He is a first generation Australian raised by his mother and father, a migrant and refugee respectively. Gumbys' father Jonas Petras Gumbys was a refugee from Lithuania who migrated in the late 1940s. He attended Dernancourt Primary School in 1975 and graduated from Gilles Plains High School in 1986. Gumbys worked at Mobil Hiltop on North East Road. He excelled in metalwork in school.

== Early career and trade unionism ==
Gumbys completed an apprenticeship in 1988 via a group training scheme conducted by the Engineering Employers Association of South Australia. At the time of application, he was 18, older than other apprentices who were taken in at the age of 16. There were over 200 applicants for the seven apprentice positions and after scoring well on the mechanical aptitude and maths tests, Gumbys secured a place at DTSO Apprentice Training School. He worked as a first class machinist and fitter in the Edinburgh defense precinct for Fairey Australasia. He has served as a longtime union delegate and was the convenor of the Australian Manufacturing Workers Union's (AMWU) National Defence and Aerospace Committee, where he campaigned that "Australian sovereign capability was of the utmost importance". Gumbys was also invited back to Canberra to work with the AMWU's "Aussie Made Campaign" alongside delegates from the bus, food and beverage industries.

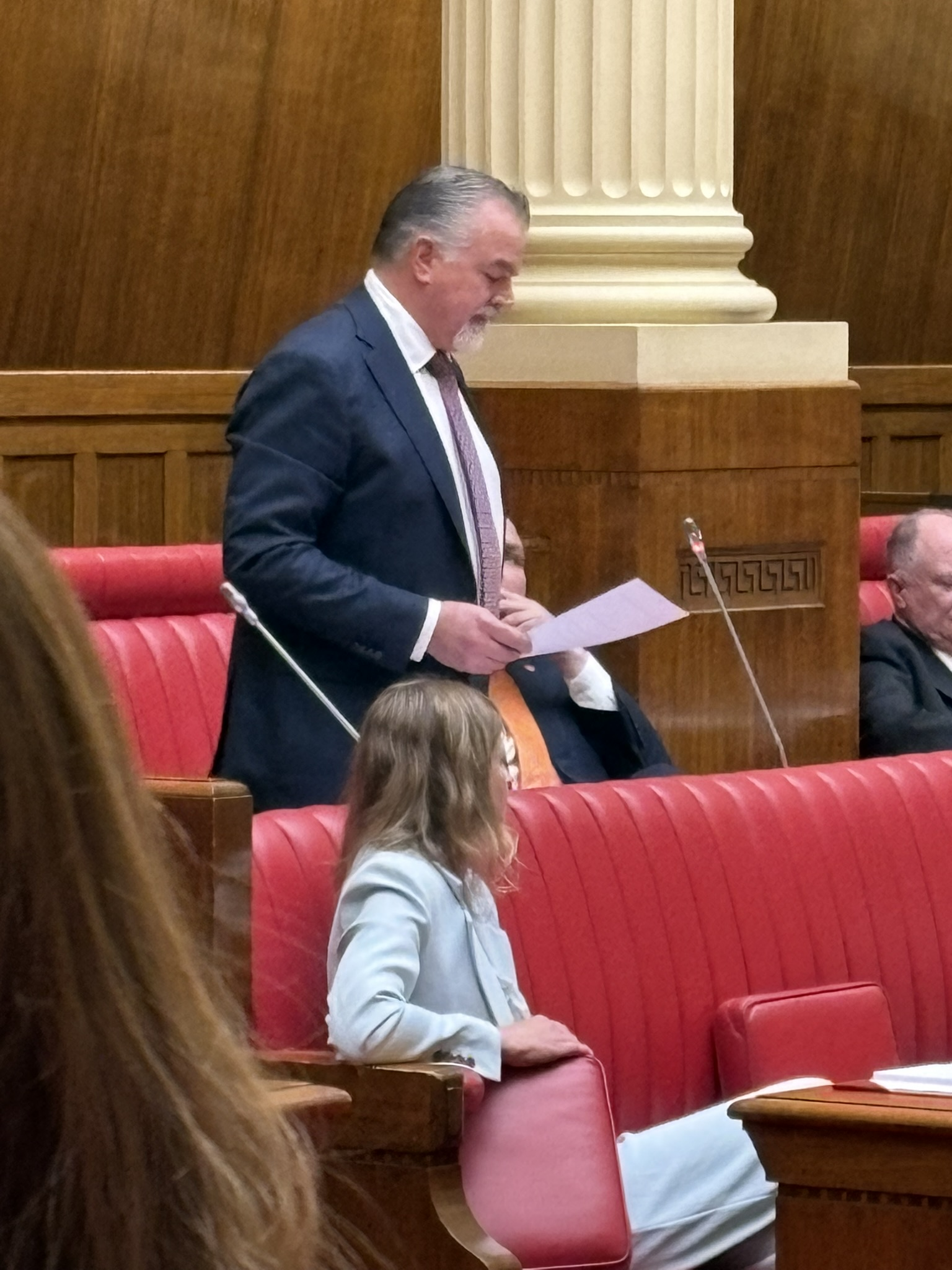
Gumbys delivering his Maiden Speech in May 2026

Gumbys was a workplace delegate at British Aerospace Engineering Australia. He has been involved in the 3D modelling and programming of CNC machining centres, assembly of key components for the F-35 Joint Strike Fighter in the Evolved Sea Sparrow Missile, and the Nulka active missile decoy. Gumbys was the sole manufacturer and assembler of critical components for Nulka's thrust control unit.

=== Campaign involvement ===
Gumbys was involved in the Your Rights at Work campaign run by the Australian Council of Trade Unions against the Howard Government's WorkChoices laws.

== Political career ==
Gumbys was placed on the fourth position on the South Australian Labor Party's ticket in the Legislative Council at the 2026 state election. He was placed ahead of sitting MLC Clare Scriven due to a deal between Labor's factions; Labor Unity was entitled to the first and fifth slot, Labor Left the second and fourth, and the Australian Workers' Union the third. Gumbys was successful, being elected to an eight-year term in the Legislative Council.

Gumbys delivered his Maiden Speech in May of 2026

Gumbys was endorsed with the backing of the South Australian Division of the AMWU, State secretary Stuart Gordon and former State Secretary Peter Bauer. He is a member of the Labor Left faction.

Gumbys is a member of the "North East Caucus" of the South Australian Labor Party, along with Blair Boyer, Rhiannon Pearce, and Olivia Savvas.

In September of 2026 Gumbys was elected chairperson of a Joint House Parliamentary Select Committee into Men’s Health and Wellbeing. Gumbys was selected because of his experience in the trades industry. Gumbys was endorsed for this role by State Greens Leader Robert Simms and Family First MLC Sarah Game. Gumbys said "working [in the] industry showed him the importance of men taking care of their health."

Gumbys has also been a keen advocate for the right of South Australians to access Voluntary Assisted Dying (VAD) or Euthanasia. Gumbys pointed to his late father in law Gerard Versteeg's directorship of the South Australian Voluntary Euthanasia Society and credits his education in the area to his father in law.
