= Federated Ironworkers' Association of Australia =

Defunct Australian trade union

F.I.A.
- Federated Ironworkers' Association of Australia
- Merged into: Federation of Industrial Manufacturing and Engineering Employees
- Founded: 1908
- Dissolved: 1991
- Location: Australia
- Affiliations: ACTU, ALP

The Federated Ironworkers' Association of Australia (FIA) was an Australian trade union which existed between 1911 and 1991. It represented labourers and semi-skilled workers employed in the steel industry and ironworking, and later also the chemical industry.

== History ==
=== Formation ===
The Federated Ironworkers' Assistants' Association of Australia was formed on 25 September 1908 at a meeting held at the Sydney Trades Hall, attended by delegates from several small state-based unions from New South Wales and Victoria, including the Amalgamated Ironworkers' Assistants' Union and the Amalgamated Society of Ironworkers' Assistants of Victoria. The newly formed FIA expanded its representation to Queensland and South Australia in the following year at its first full conference held in Melbourne in April 1909. The union received federal registration in 1911, despite objections raised by several tradesmen's craft unions, including the Federated Society of Boilermakers and the Amalgamated Society of Engineers. These unions were concerned with preserving the distinction between their skilled members and the unskilled assistant ironworkers. The FIA resisted limiting their membership to assistant ironworkers following its recent amalgamation in January 1911 with the Eskbank Ironworkers' Association of Mill and Forge Workers, which represented workers at the G. & C. Hoskins steel mill at Lithgow.

=== Growth ===
Starting from a membership of approximately 5000 the union grew rapidly during World War I and also amalgamated with several smaller unions to reach a membership of close to 10,000 by the early 1920s, approximately 10 percent of total union membership in the Australian metal industry. Half the union's membership was from New South Wales, which was divided up into several branches, including Sydney, Lithgow, Newcastle and Granville. A new branch was formed in 1917 to represent ironworkers in the shipbuilding industry in Balmain.

The FIA became increasingly militant during the first two decades of its existence, influenced by the debate over conscription in World War I, to which it was opposed, and the Australian General Strike of 1917, which involved 3000 New South Wales ironworkers. During this period the FIA became influenced by the radical left-wing political ideas of the Industrial Workers of the World (IWW), and in 1919 held a referendum over whether to affiliate to the proposed general union, the One Big Union (OBU). The proposal received 60 percent support from the membership, particularly in Sydney, but was not adopted by the 1920 Federal Council of the union.

During the 1930s the Communist Party of Australia (CPA) became heavily influential within the union. In 1936 Ernie Thornton, a member of the CPA's central committee, was elected part-time general secretary. Following the recovery of the economy in the late 1930s the position was made full-time and Thornton moved to Sydney, where he strengthened communist influence within the FIA.

Thornton's leadership of the FIA was threatened in the 1949 union elections when the Balmain branch, backed by the Labor Industrial Groups, ran a rival ticket headed by Laurie Short. Thornton won but Short took the case to the Commonwealth Court of Conciliation and Arbitration, which found that "persons unknown" had rigged the ballot, leaving Short as National Secretary. Thornton resigned in 1950 to become Australasia's representative at the World Federation of Trade Unions (WFTU) liaison bureau in Peking, but he was left without a job when the Australian Council of Trade Unions withdrew recognition of the WFTU. The FIA refused to accept him back and Thornton was employed full-time by the Communist Party. Laurie Short, a staunch anti-communist, was national secretary of the union from 1951 to 1982.

In 1983, FIA unsuccessfully sought re-affiliation with the Labor Party in NSW, which it had severed during the Australian Labor Party split of 1955. The union ultimately rejoined the Labor Party in NSW through its merger with the ALP-affiliated Australian Workers Union (AWU) in 1993.

=== Amalgamation ===
The union underwent several amalgamations, absorbing the Arms, Explosives and Munitions Workers' Federation in 1943, and later the Federated Artificial Fertiliser and Chemical Workers' Union of Australia in 1975, extending the union's coverage to the chemical industry.

The FIA merged with the Australasian Society of Engineers in 1991 to form the Federation of Industrial Manufacturing and Engineering Employees. This new union absorbed several small manufacturing unions before itself merging into the Australian Workers Union in 1993. The AWU continues to represent workers covered by the FIA.
