= 16S rRNA (cytosine967-C5)-methyltransferase =

Class of enzymes

16S rRNA (cytosine^{967}-C^{5})-methyltransferase

Identifiers
- EC no.: 2.1.1.176

Databases
- IntEnz: IntEnz view
- BRENDA: BRENDA entry
- ExPASy: NiceZyme view
- KEGG: KEGG entry
- MetaCyc: metabolic pathway
- PRIAM: profile
- PDB structures: RCSB PDB PDBe PDBsum
Search
- PMC: articles
- PubMed: articles
- NCBI: proteins

16S rRNA (cytosine^{967}-C^{5})-methyltransferase (EC 2.1.1.176, rsmB (gene), fmu (gene), 16S rRNA m5C967 methyltransferase) is an enzyme with systematic name S-adenosyl-L-methionine:16S rRNA (cytosine^{967}-C^{5})-methyltransferase. This enzyme catalyses the following chemical reaction

S-adenosyl-L-methionine + cytosine^{967} in 16S rRNA $\rightleftharpoons$ S-adenosyl-L-homocysteine + 5-methylcytosine^{967} in 16S rRNA

The enzyme specifically methylates cytosine^{967} at C^{5} in 16S rRNA.
