= Australasian Society of Engineers =

Australian trade union

The Australasian Society of Engineers (ASE) was an Australian trade union active from 1890 to 1991. It was eventually incorporated into the Australian Workers' Union (AWU).

== History ==
In 1890, the Australasian Society of Engineers was established as a breakaway from the Amalgamated Society of Engineers (later known as the Amalgamated Engineering Union). The Amalgamated Society had been formed by members of the British union of the same name, and the split occurred due to accusations of interference from Britain. The two organisations operated in parallel for over 80 years, and were constantly competing for members.

The ASE was first federally registered in 1910. In February 1938, it was deregistered by Judge Beeby of the Commonwealth Court of Conciliation and Arbitration, who determined that it had organised an illegal strike at a dockyard in New South Wales. The union was re-registered in August 1938, at which point it had around 6,000 members. The ASE amalgamated with the Federated Ironworkers' Association of Australia in 1991, forming the Federation of Industrial Manufacturing and Engineering Employees (FIMEE). FIMEE was merged into the Australian Workers' Union (AWU) the following year.

== Notable officials ==
- Frank Connors, ASE official in New South Wales, later elected to state parliament
- Edgar Dawes, ASE official in South Australia, later elected to state parliament
- Valma Ferguson, ASE official in Western Australia, later elected to state parliament
- Pat Galvin, ASE official in South Australia, later elected to the House of Representatives
- Ern Klauer, ASE official in South Australia, later elected to state parliament
- John Harris, ASE official in Western Australia, later elected to the Senate
- Frederick Marshall, ASE official in Western Australia, later elected to state parliament
- Frank Mossfield, ASE official in New South Wales, later elected to the House of Representatives
