= Boilermakers and Blacksmiths Society of Australia =

Former trade union in Australia

- Merger of: Boilermakers' Society of Australia; Blacksmiths' Society of Australia
- Location: Australia

The Boilermakers and Blacksmiths Society of Australia (BBS) was an Australian trade union representing boilermakers and blacksmiths between 1965 and 1972.

It was established on 1 January 1966 with the amalgamation of the Boilermakers' Society of Australia and the Blacksmiths' Society of Australia. Though widely described as the formation of a new union, it inherited the industrial registration of the Boilermakers' Society. The union was associated with a "militant left-wing" group within the Metal Trades Federation.

The BBS was the principal union involved in the 1971 Harco work-in, in which rank-and-file workers seized control of a heavy engineering factory in the Sydney suburb of Campbelltown to protest the sacking of five boilermakers. The workers, inspired by the example of 'work-ins' at Upper Clyde Shipbuilders in the UK and French car workers during the May 68 of 1968, occupied the factory for a period of four weeks.

It amalgamated with the Sheet Metal Working Industrial Union of Australia and the Amalgamated Engineering Union in 1972 and ceased to exist at that time; however, due to legal issues over the name of the new union, the successor Amalgamated Metal Workers Union was not registered until 1973.
