= Amalgamated Engineering Union (Australia) =

Australian trade union

A.E.U.
- Amalgamated Engineering Union (Australia)
- Merged into: Amalgamated Metal Workers' Union
- Founded: 1852
- Dissolved: 1973
- Location: Australia
- Members: 83,500 (1969)

The Amalgamated Engineering Union (AEU), originally known as the Amalgamated Society of Engineers, was an Australian trade union which existed between 1852 and 1973. It represented engineers, as well as some other metal trades workers.

== History ==
The first Australian branch of the Amalgamated Society of Engineers was formed in Sydney in 1852 by 27 members of the British union who had emigrated to Australia following a lockout in Britain. While the Australian section was the first overseas branch of the union to be formed, several others were established over the course of the 19th century, including in Canada, South Africa, New Zealand and the United States.

In 1890 a breakaway group formed the Australasian Society of Engineers, dissatisfied with the union being controlled from Britain. The ASE was to continue to operate in parallel to the AEU throughout its history, and the two organisations were bitter rivals in organising engineering workers.

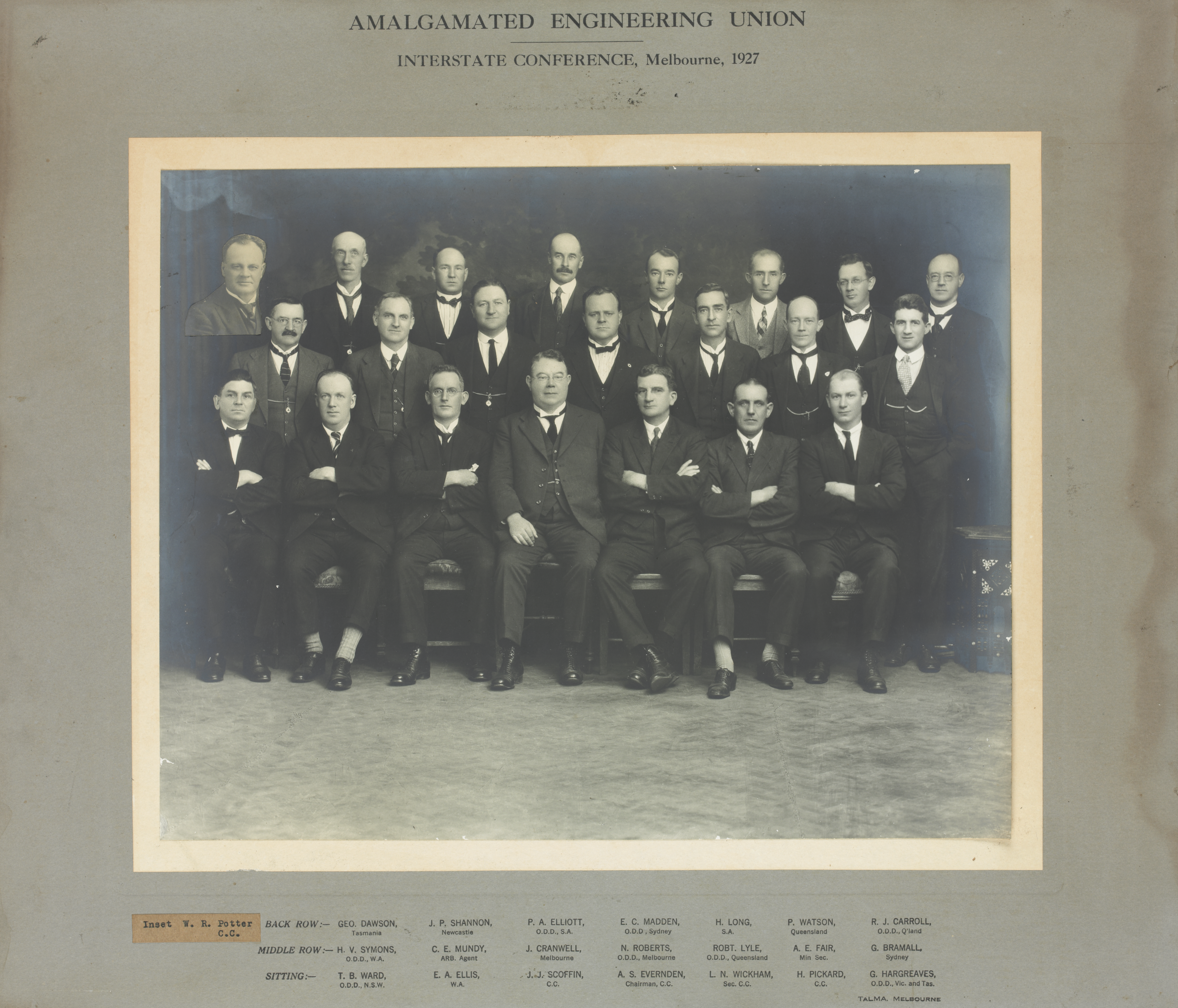
Delegates to the 1927 Interstate Conference of the AEU, held in Melbourne.

In 1921, following the amalgamation of the parent ASE union with several smaller British engineering unions, the Society was renamed the Amalgamated Engineering Union. In February 1938 the Australian branch was deregistered, but was re-established later the same year, to be known as the Amalgamated Engineering Union (Australian Section). In 1969 the Australian branch separated from its British parent union, forming an autonomous union known simply as the Amalgamated Engineering Union (AEU). In 1972 the union began amalgamating with the Sheet Metal Working Industrial Union of Australia, the Boilermakers and Blacksmiths' Society of Australia and the Federated Jewellers, Watchmakers and Allied Trades Union of Australia. Between 1976 and 1983, this new union was called the Amalgamated Metal Workers & Shipwrights Union, before becoming the Amalgamated Metal Workers' Union (AMWU).

== Constitutional Law ==
The ASE was famous for its involvement in the landmark 1920 High Court of Australia case, Amalgamated Society of Engineers v Adelaide Steamship Co. Ltd., more popularly known as the Engineers' case, which overturned the doctrine of implied intergovernmental immunities, significantly altering the balance of power in Australian federalism.
