= Electoral results for the district of Gladesville =

Election results for Gladesville, New South Wales, Australia

Gladesville, an electoral district of the Legislative Assembly in the Australian state of New South Wales was created in 1981 and abolished in 1999.

Election	Member	Party
1981	Rodney Cavalier	Labor
1984	Rodney Cavalier	Labor
1988	Ivan Petch	Liberal
1991	Ivan Petch	Liberal
1995	John Watkins	Labor

== Election results ==
=== Elections in the 1990s ===
==== 1995 ====
1995 New South Wales state election: Gladesville
Party	Candidate	Votes	%	±%
Liberal	Ivan Petch	14,182	41.7	−6.3
Labor	John Watkins	13,171	38.7	−3.1
No Aircraft Noise	Jane Waddell	3,196	9.4	+9.4
Democrats	Noel Plumb	1,960	5.8	−2.0
Against Further Immigration	Ken Malone	953	2.8	+2.8
Independent	Iris Knight	582	1.7	+1.7
Total formal votes		34,044	95.5	+4.5
Informal votes		1,615	4.5	−4.5
Turnout		35,659	93.7	
Two-party-preferred result
Labor	John Watkins	16,227	50.4	+3.3
Liberal	Ivan Petch	15,967	49.6	−3.3
Labor gain from Liberal		Swing	+3.3	

==== 1991 ====
1991 New South Wales state election: Gladesville
Party	Candidate	Votes	%	±%
Liberal	Ivan Petch	15,448	48.0	+6.8
Labor	John Watkins	13,462	41.8	+0.4
Democrats	Noel Plumb	2,514	7.8	+6.4
Call to Australia	Robyn Peebles	792	2.5	+2.5
Total formal votes		32,216	90.9	−5.8
Informal votes		3,216	9.1	+5.8
Turnout		35,432	94.1	
Two-party-preferred result
Liberal	Ivan Petch	16,543	52.9	+0.5
Labor	John Watkins	14,724	47.1	−0.5
Liberal hold		Swing	+0.5	

=== Elections in the 1980s ===
==== 1988 ====
1988 New South Wales state election: Gladesville
Party	Candidate	Votes	%	±%
Labor	Rodney Cavalier	12,027	40.4	−7.2
Liberal	Ivan Petch	11,970	40.2	+3.4
Independent	Mick Lardelli	4,686	15.8	+5.8
Nuclear Disarmament	Hugh Pitty	1,064	3.6	+3.6
Total formal votes		29,747	96.7	−0.8
Informal votes		1,013	3.3	+0.8
Turnout		30,760	94.2	
Two-party-preferred result
Liberal	Ivan Petch	15,254	53.0	+8.3
Labor	Rodney Cavalier	13,549	47.0	−8.3
Liberal gain from Labor		Swing	+8.3	

==== 1984 ====
1984 New South Wales state election: Gladesville
Party	Candidate	Votes	%	±%
Labor	Rodney Cavalier	13,818	47.8	−9.4
Liberal	Ivan Petch	10,561	36.5	+0.9
Independent	Michael Lardelli	2,927	10.1	+10.1
Democrats	John Sanders	832	2.9	−4.3
Independent	John Egan	777	2.7	+2.7
Total formal votes		28,915	97.5	+0.8
Informal votes		749	2.5	−0.8
Turnout		29,664	93.7	+1.2
Two-party-preferred result
Labor	Rodney Cavalier		55.5	−4.6
Liberal	Ivan Petch		44.5	+4.6
Labor hold		Swing	−4.6	

==== 1981 ====
1981 New South Wales state election: Gladesville
Party	Candidate	Votes	%	±%
Labor	Rodney Cavalier	16,381	57.2	
Liberal	Ivan Petch	10,190	35.6	
Democrats	Robert Springett	2,065	7.2	
Total formal votes		28,636	96.7	
Informal votes		977	3.3	
Turnout		29,613	92.5	
Two-party-preferred result
Labor	Rodney Cavalier	16,881	60.1	−0.4
Liberal	Ivan Petch	11,190	39.9	+0.4
Labor notional hold		Swing	−0.4	
