= Electoral results for the district of Fuller =

Election results for Fuller, New South Wales, Australia

Fuller, an electoral district of the Legislative Assembly in the Australian state of New South Wales was created in 1968 and abolished in 1981.

== Members ==
Election	Member	Party
1968	Peter Coleman	Liberal
1971	Peter Coleman	Liberal
1973	Peter Coleman	Liberal
1976	Peter Coleman	Liberal
1978	Rodney Cavalier	Labor

== Election results ==
=== Elections in the 1970s ===
==== 1978 ====
1978 New South Wales state election: Fuller
Party	Candidate	Votes	%	±%
Labor	Rodney Cavalier	16,049	53.3	+9.0
Liberal	Peter Coleman	12,470	41.4	−10.8
Democrats	Shirley Berg	1,569	5.2	+5.2
Total formal votes		30,088	98.2	−0.5
Informal votes		551	1.8	+0.5
Turnout		30,639	93.8	+0.1
Two-party-preferred result
Labor	Rodney Cavalier	16,638	55.3	+8.7
Liberal	Peter Coleman	13,450	44.7	−8.7
Labor gain from Liberal		Swing	+8.7	

==== 1976 ====
1976 New South Wales state election: Fuller
Party	Candidate	Votes	%	±%
Liberal	Peter Coleman	15,682	52.2	+2.4
Labor	Rodney Cavalier	13,312	44.3	+8.6
Australia	Christopher Dunkerley	1,031	3.4	−3.4
Total formal votes		30,025	98.7	+1.1
Informal votes		382	1.3	−1.1
Turnout		30,407	93.7	+0.5
Two-party-preferred result
Liberal	Peter Coleman	16,023	53.4	−1.9
Labor	Rodney Cavalier	14,002	46.6	+1.9
Liberal hold		Swing	−1.9	

==== 1973 ====
1973 New South Wales state election: Fuller
Party	Candidate	Votes	%	±%
Liberal	Peter Coleman	14,260	49.8	+3.6
Labor	William Waters	10,231	35.7	−7.5
Australia	Jean Braithwaite	1,932	6.8	+6.8
Independent	Philip Arantz	1,366	4.8	+4.8
Democratic Labor	Timothy Abrams	849	3.0	+3.0
Total formal votes		28,638	97.6	
Informal votes		711	2.4	
Turnout		29,349	93.2	
Two-party-preferred result
Liberal	Peter Coleman	15,823	55.3	+3.1
Labor	William Waters	12,815	44.7	−3.1
Liberal hold		Swing	+3.1	

==== 1971 ====
1971 New South Wales state election: Fuller
Party	Candidate	Votes	%	±%
Liberal	Peter Coleman	12,314	46.2	−2.9
Labor	Anthony Bellanto	11,517	43.2	−3.6
Defence of Government Schools	Dudley Abbott	1,541	5.8	+5.8
Democratic Labor	Kevin Davis	1,297	4.9	+0.8
Total formal votes		26,669	98.0	
Informal votes		543	2.0	
Turnout		27,212	94.3	
Two-party-preferred result
Liberal	Peter Coleman	13,906	52.1	−0.6
Labor	Anthony Bellanto	12,763	47.9	+0.6
Liberal hold		Swing	−0.6	

=== Elections in the 1960s ===
==== 1968 ====
1968 New South Wales state election: Fuller
Party	Candidate	Votes	%	±%
Liberal	Peter Coleman	12,636	49.1	
Labor	Frank Downing	12,035	46.8	
Democratic Labor	Mel Antcliff	1,051	4.1	
Total formal votes		25,722	97.4	
Informal votes		698	2.6	
Turnout		26,420	94.8	
Two-party-preferred result
Liberal	Peter Coleman	13,545	52.7	+2.4
Labor	Frank Downing	12,177	47.3	−2.4
Liberal win		(new seat)		
