= Confectionery Workers' Union of Australia =

Australian trade union from 1925 to 1992

- Predecessor: Federated Confectioners' Association of Australia; Female Confectioners' Union
- Merged into: AMWU
- Founded: 1925
- Dissolved: 1992
- Location: Australia
- Affiliations: ACTU

The Confectionery Workers' Union of Australia (CWUA) was an Australian trade union which existed between 1925 and 1992. Until 1986, it was known as the Federated Confectioners' Association of Australia (FCA). Throughout its existence, it represented factory workers in the confectionery industry, including a high proportion of women. It was also notable for its involvement in the landmark Dollar Sweets Dispute.

== Background ==
During the late nineteenth and early twentieth centuries, confectionery production expanded dramatically in Australia. Large domestic companies such as MacRobertsons were established. After the Federation of Australia, these companies grew as they gained access to a national market. Later, World War I saw Britain's share of the market decline rapidly as shipping lanes were disrupted.

As the domestic industry grew, production became increasingly mechanised, and the composition of the workforce changed as a result. While in the 1880s, confectionery was a male-dominated industry, by 1900 women and girls accounted for about half of all confectionery workers. By 1920, they outnumbered men and boys two-to-one.

Working conditions within the industry were generally poor at this time. While some employers such as Macpherson Robertson stood out for their support for reasonable working conditions and safety, there remained public concern over conditions within the industry as a whole. In 1917, the "sweating" (i.e. heavy exploitation) of women and girls in the confectionary industry was the subject of a Royal Commission.

In response to these changes within the Australian confectionery industry, two important unions were formed. The first was the Female Confectioners' Union, which was formed in 1916 in response to many female unionists' perceptions that the male-dominated unions at the time were not adequately representing their interests. Another was the Federated Confectioners' Association of Australia (FCA), the CWUA's main predecessor, which was registered in 1925.

== History ==
=== Formation of the Federated Confectioners' Union of Australia ===
The CWUA was originally registered as the Federated Confectioners' Association of Australia (FCA) in 1925, incorporating a number of predecessors including the NSW Confectioners Society and the NSW Journeymen Confectioners' Union. While attempts at unionising the industry have been recorded as early as 1880, the FCA was the first to establish a lasting organisation at the national level.

Ideologically, the union was influenced by the debates of the day over the merits of forming "One Big Union". This idea was popularised in many countries by the revolutionary syndicalist IWW, but in Australia it had also gained traction within more conservative unions such as the Australian Workers Union. Adherents of the One Big Union school of thought argued that, as corporations became more powerful and centralised, labour unions ought to follow their example if they were to remain a serious force. However, the FCA's insistence on the One Big Union principle would become a source of tension with the Female Confectioners' Union, who until 1945 insisted on separate organising.

=== The Female Confectioners' Union ===
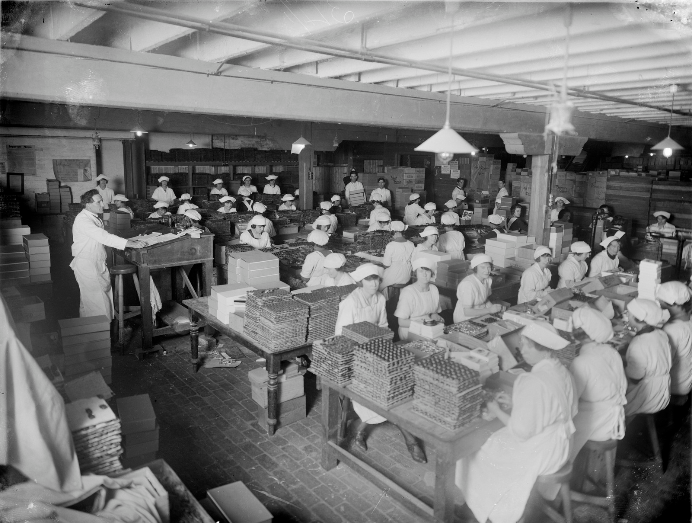
Workers packing confectionery at the MacRobertson's Factory in Fitzroy, Victoria.

The Female Confectioners' Union was founded in Victoria in 1916. It was one of several women's unions that emerged in Victoria following the success of the women's suffrage movement in 1908. It was formed as a result of concerns among female confectionery workers that the main trade union in the industry, the Victorian United Confectioners' Society, was not adequately representing their interests. While the workforce was by this stage composed predominantly of women and girls, the Victorian United Confectioners' Society remained male-dominated. A tipping point for female confectioners' frustrations came in 1914, when several male trade unionists signed off on a wage determination made by the Victorian Wages Boards which undermined pay and conditions for women in the industry.

Isaac Johnston, a male trade unionist with no background in the industry, was elected as the women's union's first Secretary (although this was not an uncommon occurrence among similar unions at the time). All other positions were held by women. The bulk of the organisation's work was undertaken by shop stewards and unelected rank-and-file members. Margaret Wearne, who would later become a key player in the advancement of women's rights in the trade union movement, was notable for her work as a shop steward in the union. At one point in time, she had managed to enrol 95% of female employees at the MacRobertson's factory in Melbourne.

The union faced a variety of challenges. There was a rapid turnover of women in leadership roles within the union, in part due to the prevailing social norm that married women were to withdraw from the workforce. Between 1916 and 1922, thirty-four different women had been committee members, of whom only four were married. For the same reasons, the workforce in the sector as a whole was exceptionally young: 80% of female confectionery workers were younger than 25, and the vast majority of this group were between 10 and 19 years old. Furthermore, the women's union often came into conflict with the male-dominated confectionery unions. A particular point of tension was representation on the Victorian Wages Board, which determined wages in the sector. Male union delegates on the Wages Board, in line with common stereotypes, had a low estimation of women's ability to bargain for themselves. The women's union, on the contrary, feared that the men's union would fail to represent women's interests, a fear that was again vindicated in 1919 when male union representatives voted against an increase to women's wages in the sector. The situation was inflamed further by the fact that the men's union was represented by Isaac Johnston, who by this stage had been expelled from the Female Confectioners' Union due to accusations of inappropriate behaviour and financial impropriety.

Notionally, the Female Confectioners' Union supported the concept of One Big Union, and at various times maintained a working relationship with the male-dominated confectionery unions. In 1925, it appeared that they would merge into the FCA; however, negotiations collapsed once again due to disagreements over women's representation on the Wages Board. The women's union would continue to organise separately for another two decades until their amalgamation with the FCA in 1945.

=== The Dollar Sweets Dispute ===
In 1985, the union became involved in an industrial and legal dispute with Dollar Sweets, a Victorian confectionery company. It has been regarded by many commentators as a landmark case.

The dispute occurred against the backdrop of the Prices and Incomes Accord, an agreement between the ACTU and the Australian Labor Party government led by Bob Hawke. The Accord was an attempt to steer Australia out of the stagflation crisis that was affecting the world's industrialised economies at the time. The terms of the Accord stated that trade unions were to moderate their wage claims, and dictated a limited set of circumstances under which they could legally take industrial action; in return, the government promised that workers' wages would be centrally fixed and indexed to inflation.

The FCA was among the few unions that had refused to sign the Accord. Many of these unions were associated with a small, hard-left faction of the Labor Party, of which the FCA's Victorian leader Carlo Frizziero was a member.

In 1983, the owner of Dollar Sweets, Fred Stauder, offered his employees pay increases in line with those fixed centrally under the Accord, despite the fact that the union was not a formal signatory. The employees unanimously agreed.

In 1985 union members at the Dollar Sweets factory requested a reduction of working hours from 38 to 36 per week without a reduction in pay. Stauder argued that this contravened the prior agreement, as it essentially functioned as a wage claim and therefore fell outside the terms of the Accord. Stauder then insisted that if his workers wished to maintain their existing conditions, they would have to sign a no-strike agreement; however, the majority of workers (15 out of 27) voted down this proposal. Stauder then fired the 15 workers that voted "no" and replaced them with non-union labour.

The sacked workers established a round-the-clock picket of the site that lasted 143 days. The union abandoned the prospect of a reduction in hours, and demanded instead that the workers be reinstated. According to Peter Costello, who represented Stauder as a junior barrister during the dispute, the picketers employed a variety of militant tactics, obstructing not only workers who were trying to enter the site but also truck drivers who were attempting to deliver supplies. Telex lines to the building were cut, and telecom workers engaged in a secondary boycott by refusing to cross the picket line to make repairs. In October, the Conciliation and Arbitration Commission ordered the workers to cease picketing.

The dispute was accompanied by a long and bitter legal battle, resulting in the union paying $175,000 in damages to Dollar Sweets for financial losses incurred during the picket. Prior to the dispute, it was highly unusual for an Australian union to be compelled by common law to pay financial compensation to a company. It therefore set an important legal precedent.

Recognising its significance, many of the figures and institutions associated with the emerging New Right in Australia rallied around the dispute, providing Stauder with financial support, legal advice, and publicity. The Dollar Sweets company's legal costs were underwritten by the Melbourne Chamber of Commerce. Deputy-president of the Australian Chamber of Commerce Andrew Hay was a vocal public supporter of the company. The dispute also launched the political careers some of its key protagonists. Peter Costello, who supported Stauder legally throughout the dispute, would go on to become Treasurer during the Howard government; Michael Kroger, another lawyer, also achieved considerable influence within the Liberal Party.

The dispute also affected the union's relationship with the ACTU and the Hawke Labor government. Both of the latter parties viewed the dispute as a threat to the integrity of the Accords, the ALP's economic strategy, and ultimately their own legitimacy. The ALP and the ACTU largely withheld support for the confectioner's union and publicly distanced themselves from the dispute, setting an example for other unions who may have otherwise considered deviating from the social contract outlined by the Accords. However, many ALP and trade union figures expressed alarm at the precedent set by the Supreme Court's decision to make the union pay damages.

== Amalgamation and legacy ==
In 1986, the FCA changed their name to the Confectionery Workers Union of Australia. In 1992 CWUA merged with the Food Preservers Union of Australia to form the Confectionery Workers & Food Preservers Union of Australia. This new union then amalgamated with the Automotive Metals & Engineering Union in 1994 to form the Automotive Food Metals & Engineering Union, with former CWUA secretary Carlo Frizziero taking up leadership of the newly-formed Food and Confectionery Division. By 1995, this union had incorporated various other sectors under the banner of the Automotive Food Metals Engineering Printing & Kindred Industries Union, more commonly known as the Australian Manufacturing Workers Union (AMWU). Today, the AMWU retains a dedicated National Food Industry Committee that represents the interests of members working in the food and confectionery industries.
