= Dollar Sweets dispute =

1985 industrial dispute in Australia

The Dollar Sweets dispute in 1985 was a small industrial dispute in Australia with major legal ramifications in industrial relations where an employer resorted to a common law verdict and damages in a case in the Supreme Court of Victoria to resolve a dispute after industrial courts proved ineffective. It was the first time a trade union was forced to pay common law damages to an employer for losses suffered through picketing in Australia. The dispute was also significant for boosting the career of the barrister representing the company, Peter Costello, leading him to stand for federal Parliament and become Treasurer in the Howard Government.

== Background ==
Dollar Sweets was a confectionery company on Malvern Rd in the Melbourne suburb of Glen Iris, Victoria employing 27 people on a 38-hour week basis. The award for the industry specified a 40-hour week. The Hawke Government and the ACTU had entered into a wages accord which provided employer superannuation, reduced taxation and other social gains in return for unions agreeing to not pursue excessive wage claims. At the same time, centralised wage fixing was introduced in September 1983 where indexed wage rises were automatically granted to those workers whose unions undertook to abide by the Arbitration Commission's principles.

Several small unions, including the Federated Confectioners Association of Australia, refused to join the accord.

The company owner, Fred Stauder, proposed an agreement with his employees in November 1983, that if they agreed to abide by the principles of the Arbitration Commission, the company would pay them the prescribed increases. All 27 employees agreed to the proposal.

== The dispute ==
In July 1985, the Federated Confectioners Association started a campaign with employers for a 36-hour week. Although this breached Arbitration Commission wage-fixing principles, the union had never agreed to accept those principles. When the union demanded negotiations with Stauder on a 36-hour week, Stauder told the union he could not afford to reduce hours and offered to show his accounts to the union. A reduction in hours would have also broken the 1983 agreement Stauder had reached with his employees.

Stauder offered his 27 employees that if they wished to continue to receive over-award pay for a (below-award) 38-hour week, they could do so if they signed a no-strike agreement; but, if they wanted to work a 36-hour week, they would have to find it elsewhere. Twelve employees accepted Stauder's offer, whereas the other 15 refused to sign the no-strike agreement and were subsequently sacked by the company, with the company employing another 15 workers in their place on existing conditions.

On 22 July 1985, a picket line was established by the sacked workers outside the Dollar Sweets factory. The picket line remained for 143 days, with the company refusing to reinstate the workers.

By October 1985, the company was still refusing to reinstate the sacked workers but through the Conciliation and Arbitration Commission had provided "an offer to assist in finding alternate employment within the industry and also to supply references to those people." Commissioner Bain recommended "that those who have been picketing should accept the employer's offer and cease their picketing forthwith."

A number of bomb and arson threats were made against Dollar Sweets and one strike-breaking driver was assaulted and his truck vandalised. At one point, phone and telex lines were cut to the factory with telecom workers refusing to cross the picket line to repair the services.

Dollar Sweets received strong support and assistance from Richard Mulcahy, chief executive officer of the Confectionery Manufacturers of Australia. By December 1985, it was decided to seek an injunction under common law against the union in the Supreme Court of Victoria, with solicitor Michael Kroger engaging Alan Goldberg QC to lead junior barrister and future federal Treasurer Peter Costello to represent the company. The case was financed by the Victorian Chamber of Commerce.

The company alleged union interference with contractual relations, intimidation, nuisance, and a conspiracy to injure the plaintiff and sought an injunction and punitive damages. Victorian Supreme Court Justice Peter Murphy gave judgement, issued restraining orders on 12 December with the picket ending the next day. In his judgement, Murphy described the picketing as "stupid and nihilistic." He ruled that this was not a "lawful form of picketing, but a... nuisance involving obstruction, harassment, and besetting". It was beside the point that there were specialist courts for industrial disputes. "This court is not without power ... and should intervene". He issued an interlocutory injunction against the picket, The common law damages claim was settled in April 1988, when the union paid the sum of $175,000 to Dollar Sweets as compensation for the losses it suffered as a result of the picket.

== Aftermath ==
Fred Stauder sold Dollar Sweets Holding Limited in 1999, which is now called Snack Foods Limited.

Peter Costello described the case as "It came to be bracketed with the Mudginberri Abattoir case as a great victory against militant unionism".

Doug Cameron, the secretary of the Australian Manufacturing Workers Union, with which the Federated Confectioners Association amalgamated, saw the dispute as a turning point. "It was when the social contract between workers, business and the government started to collapse," and "It became a cause celebre for the big end of town and lawyers started to realise they could make money ripping off the pay and conditions of workers."
