= The Costello Memoirs =

2008 book by Peter Costello

- The Costello Memoirs
- Author: Peter Costello; Peter Coleman
- Subject: The Liberal Party and the Howard government
- Genre: Politics
- Publisher: Melbourne University Publishing
- Publication date: September 2008
- Publication place: Australia
- Pages: 400 + 16pp pictures
- ISBN: 978-0-522-85582-1
- OCLC: 276602673

The Costello Memoirs is a collection of writings by Australian politician and long-standing treasurer and deputy Liberal leader Peter Costello and co-authored by former New South Wales Liberal Leader and Costello's father-in-law, Peter Coleman. The book was launched on 16 September 2008 at the National Press Club and released in stores on 17 September 2008.

Booksellers were obliged by Melbourne University Publishing to sign a confidentiality agreement, common with new release books, stating they would not release the book before the official release date, with harsh legal ramifications if they did.

Extracts from the book appeared in newspapers across Australia before the book's release.
