= Verna Coleman =

Australian biographer (1925–2011)

- Coleman in 1944
- Born: Verna Susannah Scott; 13 September 1925; Sydney, Australia
- Died: 4 November 2011 (aged 86)
- Education: University of Sydney
- Occupations: Biographer, librarian
- Spouse: Peter Coleman
- Children: 3
- Writing career
- Notable works: Miles Franklin in America; The Last Exquisite; The Wayward Suffragette

Verna Susannah Coleman (née Scott; born 13 September 1925 – 4 November 2011) was an Australian biographer whose work focused on neglected aspects of controversial expatriate literary and political figures.

== Life and work ==
Verna Susannah Coleman was born in Sydney, the second daughter of Jack and Ruby Scott, and educated at Our Lady of Mercy College, Parramatta and the University of Sydney. After graduating in Arts, she worked as a librarian in the Mitchell Library and in the library of Canberra University College.

She wrote literary reviews for various journals from 1950 to 2005, but her first biographical subject was novelist Miles Franklin, whom she had assisted as a young librarian in the Mitchell Library. Miles Franklin in America: Her Unknown (Brilliant) Career covered Franklin's political career with the feminist and union movements in Chicago. The Last Exquisite explored the life of the Australian expatriate poet and Great War novelist Frederic Manning, who left Sydney at the age of 21 to become a controversial literary figure in London.

The Wayward Suffragette was a study of activist Adela Pankhurst, daughter of suffragette leader Emmeline Pankhurst, and is the only biography of this polarising figure, about whom it had been suggested that a biography could never be written. It follows her emigration to Australia, where she became prominent at both ends of the political spectrum, moving from the Communist Party to the far right Australia First movement.

At the time of her death Verna Coleman was working on a study of the careers of the New Zealand writer Katherine Mansfield and Katherine's Sydney-born cousin, Elizabeth von Arnim.

Verna Coleman was married to writer and politician Peter Coleman, and had two daughters, Tanya, who became a lawyer and later wife of Deputy Liberal Leader Peter Costello; Ursula, a children's writer; and a son, William, who is an economist.

== Biographies ==
Her Unknown (Brilliant) Career: Miles Franklin in America (1981) Angus and Robertson, Sydney. ISBN 0207145369, 9780207145360

The Last Exquisite: A Portrait of Frederic Manning (1990) Melbourne University Press, Melbourne. ISBN 0522843700, 9780522843705

Adela Pankhurst: The Wayward Suffragette 1885–1961 (1996) Melbourne University Press, Melbourne. ISBN 0522847285, 978-0522847284

== Other biographical and critical writings ==
"Walsh, Adela Constantia Mary Pankhurst (1885–1961)" (2004) The Oxford Dictionary of National Biography Oxford University Press, United Kingdom. ISBN 9780198614111

Foreword (1981) My career goes bung : purporting to be the autobiography of Sybilla Penelope Melvyn Miles Franklin by Miles Franklin Virago Modern Classics, London. ISBN 086068220X

"Portrait of the artist as a young girl" on the Australian writer Amy Witting, Quadrant, Sydney, 1990, Vol. 34 No. 263, pp. 110–111

The Good Reading Guide: 100 Critics review contemporary Australian fiction (1989) Helen Daniel (editor) McPhee Gribble, Melbourne. ISBN 0869141678, 9780869141670 entries on Jessica Andersen, Janette Turner Hospital, Barry Humphries, George Johnston, Christopher Koch, Morris Lurie, Peter Shrubb, Christina Stead.
