= Michael Kroger =

Australian businessman

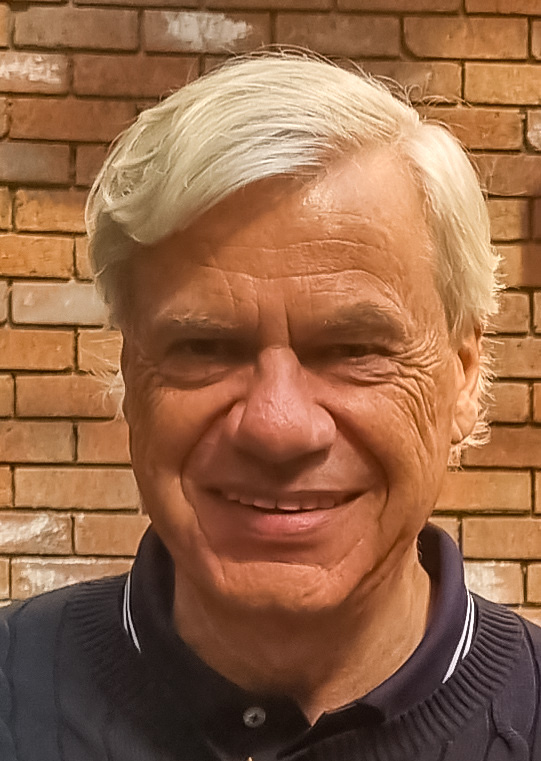
- Kroger in 2024
- Succeeded by: Robert Clark

Personal details
- Born: 30 May 1957 (age 69) Melbourne, Australia
- Party: Victorian Liberal Party

Michael Norman Kroger (born 30 May 1957) is a former Australian lawyer. He was president of the Victorian Liberal Party from 1987 to 1992 and from 2015 to 2018, and is considered a member of the conservative faction.

== Early life ==
Kroger was educated at Wesley College, Melbourne, where his father Jack Kroger was a senior master. He became politically active while studying at Monash University where he graduated with Bachelor of Jurisprudence and Bachelor of Laws degrees. He became president of the Australian Liberal Students' Federation in 1978.

== Politics ==
In 1985, Kroger briefed Alan Goldberg QC to lead junior barrister and future federal Treasurer Peter Costello to represent Confectionery Manufacturers of Australia in the Dollar Sweets case. Kroger currently has an estranged relationship with Costello.

From 1987 to 1992, Kroger served as president of the Victorian Liberal Party. He instituted a series of reforms, including a move to increase the power of the party executive in pre-selections. From the 1990s the Victorian Liberal Party was heavily factionalised.

In 1993, Kroger established JT Campbell & Co. Although described as a "merchant bank", JT Campbell & Co attracted media ridicule for its minimal volume of banking and investment activity.

From 1998 to 2003, he served as a director of the Australian Broadcasting Corporation, which he has considered to be a "cultural battleground".

From 2015 to 2018, Kroger served again as president of the Victorian Liberal Party. Kroger's second term was characterised by branch stacking within the party, public fallout surrounding the misuse of public funds by former State Director Damien Mantach, and his legal action against the Cormack Foundation, the party's largest donor.

Although Kroger vowed reform following the 2014 Victorian state election, the Coalition suffered a landslide defeat in the 2018 Victorian state election. Subsequently, Kroger resigned as State President of the Liberal Party on 30 November 2018.

Since retiring from day-to-day party politics, Kroger has mad appearances on Sky News Australia.

Kroger advised John Pesutto, former Liberal Victorian Opposition leader, in the expulsion of Moira Deeming.

== Legacy ==
A self-described "power broker", Kroger is considered a divisive member of the Victorian Liberal Party, and has been criticised by former Premiers Jeff Kennett and Ted Baillieu as such.

== Personal life ==
Kroger's first wife was Helen Kroger, who after their divorce became a Senator for Victoria. Kroger then married Ann Peacock, daughter of former leader of the Liberal Party Andrew Peacock and socialite Susan Renouf. They separated in 2009.
