= John Watkins (Australian politician) =

Australian politician

The Honourable John Watkins AM

Deputy Premier of New South Wales
- In office 10 August 2005 – 3 September 2008
- Premier: Morris Iemma
- Preceded by: Andrew Refshauge
- Succeeded by: Carmel Tebbutt
- Constituency: Ryde

Chancellor of the University of New England
- In office 17 April 2013 – 30 June 2014
- Preceded by: Richard Torbay
- Succeeded by: James Harris

Personal details
- Born: 7 December 1955 (age 70) Sydney, New South Wales, Australia
- Party: Labor Party
- Spouse: Deborah Watkins
- Profession: Teacher

John Arthur Watkins AM (born 7 December 1955) is a former Deputy Premier of New South Wales, serving between 2005 until his resignation from Parliament in 2008. Watkins was the chief executive officer of Alzheimer's Australia (NSW) from 2008 – 2017 when it merged into Dementia Australia; the Chairman of Calvary healthcare from 2011 – 2019; and the eighth Chancellor of the University of New England, serving between 2013 and 2014.

Watkins was an elected as a member of the New South Wales Legislative Assembly representing the electorates of Gladesville (between 1995 and 1999) and then Ryde (between 1999 and 2008) for the Labor Party. During his parliamentary career, Watkins served in a range of ministerial portfolios including Fair Trading, Sport and Recreation, Police and Corrective Services, Transport, Finance, State Development, and Education and Training. Often touted as a possible Labor premier, Watkins was from the minority Labor Left faction.

== Early years and background ==
Watkins is married to Deborah and together they have five children. He holds a Bachelor of Laws degree, a Master of Arts degree and a Diploma of Education. Prior to becoming a politician, Watkins was a school teacher at St. Joseph's College, Hunters Hill.

Watkins was a former Alderman on Hunters Hill Municipal Council from 1987 to 1991, and held the position of Deputy Mayor.

== Political career ==
Watkins was an elected as a member of the New South Wales Legislative Assembly representing the electorate of Gladesville in the 1995 election for the Labor Party. Gladesville was abolished in the 1999 election and Watkins contested and won the new seat of Ryde in the election.

Watkins was appointed Minister for Fair Trading and Sports (1999–2001), Minister for Education (2001–2003) and Minister for Police (2003–2005). Watkins was appointed Deputy Premier in August 2005, following the resignation of Andrew Refshauge and upon the appointment of Morris Iemma as Premier. Watkins held the cabinet position of Transport Minister from January 2005. In 2006, whilst retaining Transport, Watkins unexpectedly returned to the Police portfolio following the abrupt sacking of Carl Scully. Scully had earlier succeeded Watkins as Police Minister in 2005. Watkins held both Transport and Police until he was appointed Minister for Finance on 30 March 2007 following the reelection of the Iemma Government. Watkins resigned from Cabinet and retired from Parliament in 2008, saying that he had been unable to balance work and family. His retirement triggered the unintentional downfall of Premier Morris Iemma three days later. His resignation came at a bad time for the government; its polling numbers were in free fall only a year after winning reelection. In the ensuing by-election, Ryde was resoundingly lost to Liberal Victor Dominello on a swing of 23.7 percent; only a year earlier, Watkins had been reelected with 60 percent of the two-party vote.

== Post politics ==
In 2008, Watkins was appointed as chief executive officer of Alzheimer's Australia (NSW); after serving as a board member in 2011 he was appointed Chairman of Calvary (Little Company of Mary Healthcare); and in April 2013, he was appointed to succeed Richard Torbay as the eighth Chancellor of the University of New England, until his resignation in June 2014.

He was announced as a Member of the Order of Australia (AM) in the 2015 Queens Birthday Honours List for his significant service to the community through leadership in health, education and to the Parliament of New South Wales.

In 2017, he was approached to run as the ALP candidate for the federal Bennelong by-election, as Bennelong encompasses his old state seat of Ryde, but declined after former premier Kristina Keneally informed him that she wanted to run in the by-election.

Keneally duly became the candidate but was not successful at the by-election.

In March 2022, Watkins was voted in as Deputy Chair of the Parkinson's NSW Board.

== Personal life ==
Watkins has Parkinson's disease and has been an advocate for increasing knowledge about the disease and reducing stigma.

New South Wales Legislative Assembly
Preceded by Ivan Petch	Member for Gladesville; 1995–1999	District abolished
New district	Member for Ryde; 1999–2008	Succeeded by Victor Dominello
Political offices
Preceded by Jeff Shaw	Minister for Fair Trading; 1999–2001	Succeeded by Reba Meagher
Preceded by Gabrielle Harrison	Minister for Sport and Recreation; 1999–2001	Succeeded by Sandra Nori as Minister for Tourism, Sport and Recreation
Preceded by Bob Debus	Minister for Corrective Services; 2001	Succeeded by Bob Debus
Preceded by John Aquilina	Minister for Education and Training; 2001–2003	Succeeded by Andrew Refshauge
Preceded by Paul Whelan	Minister for Police; 2003–2005	Succeeded by Carl Scully
Preceded by Michael Costa as Minister for Transport Services	Minister for Transport; 2005–2008	Succeeded by David Campbell
Preceded by Michael Egan	Minister for State Development; 2005–2006	Succeeded by Morris Iemma
Preceded by Andrew Refshauge	Deputy Premier of New South Wales; 2005–2008	Succeeded by Carmel Tebbutt
Preceded by Carl Scully	Minister for Police; 2006–2007	Succeeded by David Campbell
Preceded by John Della Bosca	Minister for Finance; 2007–2008	Succeeded by Joe Tripodi
Academic offices
Preceded by Richard Torbay	Chancellor of the University of New England; 2013–2014	Succeeded by James Harris
