= Electoral district of Gladesville =

Former state electoral district of New South Wales, Australia

Gladesville was an electoral district of the Legislative Assembly in the Australian state of New South Wales was created in 1981 replacing Fuller. It included the Sydney suburb of Gladesville. It was abolished in 1999 and was replaced by Ryde.

== Members for Gladesville ==
Member	Party	Term
Rodney Cavalier	Labor	1981–1988
Ivan Petch	Liberal	1988–1995
John Watkins	Labor	1995–1999

== Election results ==
1995 New South Wales state election: Gladesville
Party	Candidate	Votes	%	±%
Liberal	Ivan Petch	14,182	41.7	−6.3
Labor	John Watkins	13,171	38.7	−3.1
No Aircraft Noise	Jane Waddell	3,196	9.4	+9.4
Democrats	Noel Plumb	1,960	5.8	−2.0
Against Further Immigration	Ken Malone	953	2.8	+2.8
Independent	Iris Knight	582	1.7	+1.7
Total formal votes		34,044	95.5	+4.5
Informal votes		1,615	4.5	−4.5
Turnout		35,659	93.7	
Two-party-preferred result
Labor	John Watkins	16,227	50.4	+3.3
Liberal	Ivan Petch	15,967	49.6	−3.3
Labor gain from Liberal		Swing	+3.3	
