= Peter Costello =

Australian politician (born 1957)

The Honourable Peter Costello AC
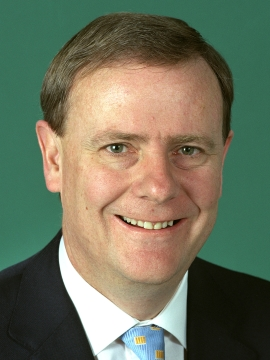
- Official portrait, 2004

Treasurer of Australia
- In office 11 March 1996 – 3 December 2007
- Prime Minister: John Howard
- Preceded by: Ralph Willis
- Succeeded by: Wayne Swan

Deputy Leader of the Liberal Party
- In office 23 May 1994 – 29 November 2007
- Leader: Alexander Downer; John Howard
- Preceded by: Michael Wooldridge
- Succeeded by: Julie Bishop

Member of the Australian Parliament for Higgins
- In office 24 March 1990 – 19 October 2009
- Preceded by: Roger Shipton
- Succeeded by: Kelly O'Dwyer

Personal details
- Born: Peter Howard Costello; 14 August 1957 (age 69) Melbourne, Victoria, Australia
- Party: Liberal
- Other political affiliations: Coalition
- Spouse: Tanya Coleman (m. 1982)
- Children: 3
- Relatives: Tim Costello (brother); Patrick Costello
- Education: Carey Baptist Grammar School
- Alma mater: Monash University
- Profession: Barrister

Peter Howard Costello (born 14 August 1957) is an Australian former politician and barrister who served as the treasurer of Australia from 1996 to 2007 and the deputy leader of the Liberal Party from 1994 to 2007. He was the member of parliament (MP) for the Victorian division of Higgins from 1990 to 2009.

In 2008, Costello was appointed as chairman of the World Bank's new Independent Advisory Board (IAB) to provide advice on anti-corruption measures. He served as Chairman of Nine Entertainment from 2016 until 2024. Costello is Chairman of the Board of Guardians of Australian Future Fund.

== Early life ==
Costello was born on 14 August 1957 in Melbourne into a middle-class family of practising Christians. He was the second of three children; his elder brother, Tim, is a prominent Baptist minister and former CEO of World Vision Australia. Costello was educated at Carey Baptist Grammar School (graduating in 1974) and Monash University, where he studied arts and law, graduating with honours in 1982. Costello is a descendant of Irish immigrant Patrick Costello, who was expelled from the Parliament of Victoria in the 1860s for electoral fraud.

During the 1980s, Costello was a solicitor at the law firm Mallesons Stephen Jaques, then became a barrister and represented employers in some of Australia's best-known industrial relations disputes.

In 1982, Costello married Tanya (née Coleman), daughter of writer and former Liberal politician Peter Coleman and historian Verna Coleman.

In 1983 and 1984, Costello represented the National Farmers' Federation in legal action against the Australasian Meat Industry Employees Union (AMIEU). The AMIEU was seeking a unit tally system to be set up in abattoirs in the Northern Territory. The dispute focussed on one abattoir, Mudginberri, which chose to fight the AMIEU claim. Ultimately the AMIEU claim was unsuccessful.

Costello became counsel to organisations representing small business and rose to prominence in the 1985 Dollar Sweets case, as junior counsel assisting Alan Goldberg QC, successfully representing a confectionery company involved in a bitter industrial dispute.

== Political background ==
In his student years, Costello was active in student politics. For a time, he was an office-bearer of the Social Democratic Students Association of Victoria, an affiliate of the Balaclava Branch of Australian Young Labor. In 1977, Costello was assaulted by a left-wing student politician, receiving mainstream media attention for the first time in his career as a result.

After graduating, Costello became more conservative but retained progressive views on some social issues. In 1984 he was a founding member of the H. R. Nicholls Society, a think tank on industrial relations. In the late 1980s, he was identified as part of the New Right movement, which was organised to some extent in the H. R. Nicholls Society.

== Political career ==
=== Early political career ===
In 1990, Costello defeated sitting member Roger Shipton in a preselection ballot for the comfortably safe Liberal inner-east Melbourne electorate of Higgins, the seat once held by Harold Holt and John Gorton. He entered the House of Representatives at the age of 32. Costello made his maiden speech in May 1990 and mentioned "government should be subservient to the citizen; the Executive accountable to the representative parliament; and the monopoly give way in the face of the individual." Following the resignation of Andrew Peacock, Costello voted for John Hewson to replace Peacock as Liberal Leader and Costello was made shadow minister for Consumer affairs and later Shadow Attorney General. However, Hewson, despite launching Peter's local campaign in Higgins, was said to have been suspicious of Costello due to his admiration for John Howard; and is alleged to have made it clear to Costello that he would not be appointed a Minister in a Hewson government.

On one occasion Hewson accused Costello of bad mouthing him to journalist Laurie Oakes, which Costello denied.

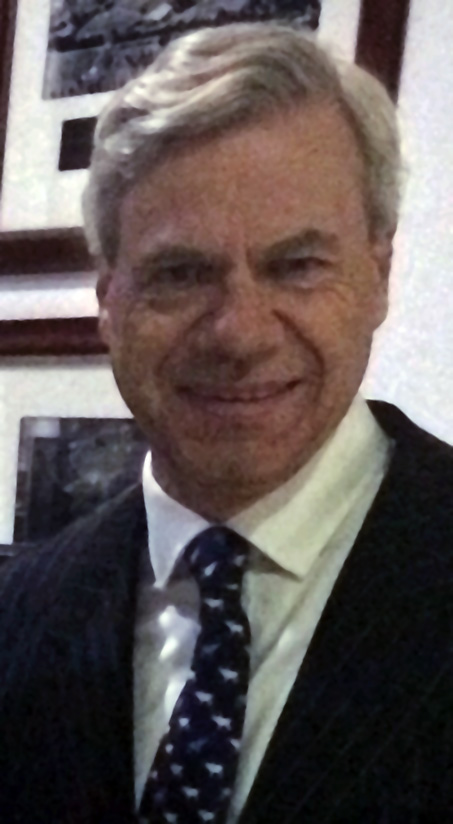
Costello's friend, former Liberal Party President Michael Kroger in 2015

Hewson's shock defeat at the 1993 election, Costello believes, can be attributed to Hewson lacking the experience to know which things to try to change and which things to avoid trying to change. Costello believed Hewson fought everyone from Churches and Welfare groups over the GST to the Superannuation and Medicare organisations and recipients. Costello claimed he found it hard to promote the Liberal party's zero Tariff policy to the car industry.

Costello developed a higher profile following the 1993 election, becoming Shadow Finance Minister (though apparently failing to become deputy Liberal Party leader). Costello came to be seen as an alternative leader to Hewson, especially through, but not limited to, the "sports rorts affair" where, at the urging of Costello and Hewson, Sport Minister Ros Kelly was forced to resign after it was revealed she had not handled sports' funding proposals properly. Hewson was deposed as Liberal leader in May 1994, Costello supported Alexander Downer for the leadership, becoming his Deputy Leader and shadow Treasurer. But what may well have prevented Costello from challenging Hewson for the leadership himself was an accusation by Victorian Liberal Premier Jeff Kennett that Costello and his friend, former Victorian Liberal party president Michael Kroger, had undermined Hewson's leadership prior to Hewson calling the leadership spill.

However, when Downer in turn resigned in January 1995. Costello did not seek the leadership, instead supporting John Howard. It was later alleged—in July 2006—that this was due to a December 1994 meeting of Howard, Costello and Ian McLachlan in which Costello is said to have agreed not to challenge for the leadership in 1995 and Howard is said to have agreed to stand aside after one and a half terms as prime minister for Costello to take over. Howard denied that this was a formal arrangement.

In 2009, Hewson stated that Costello's best chances of becoming leader were at the 1994 leadership spill (which Hewson noted with irony) or when Downer stood down 7–8 months later.

Costello became the longest serving Deputy Leader in 2006, breaking the record held by the party's first Deputy Leader Sir Eric Harrison. He also spent all but the last two years of his political career on the front bench.

=== Federal Treasurer (1996–2007) ===
The Liberal/National coalition headed by Howard won the 1996 election, defeating the Keating government on a 29-seat swing, and Costello became Federal Treasurer at age 38, the same age at which Howard himself had become treasurer in 1977. He oversaw the return to and maintenance of federal budget surpluses, which enabled significant reduction in government debt. Costello brought down twelve consecutive Federal Budgets, including ten surpluses. During this period he eliminated the Commonwealth Government net debt of $96 billion. He also sold 2/3rds of the Reserve Bank's substantial gold holdings at a record low price. Inflation, interest rates and unemployment all fell and remained generally low during Costello's term as Treasurer.

Tax reform became a major policy focus for Costello. Although John Howard had promised during the 1996 election campaign that he would "never, ever" introduce a GST, it returned as Liberal Party policy for the 1998 election. It was passed through the Senate with the help of the Australian Democrats. Until July 2005, Costello's own agenda of labour market deregulation remained blocked by the government's lack of a Senate majority.

In 1998, Costello and his wife Tanya, along with Tony Abbott and his wife Margaret, successfully sued author Bob Ellis for false statements he made about them in his book Goodbye Jerusalem.

Costello advocated for change to a republic at the Australian Constitutional Convention 1998. He rejected any suggestion that Australia was not already an independent nation and said that the Australian Constitution works "remarkably well". It was the institution of monarchy that was the crux of his argument for change:

It is commonly said that all this argument is about is whether we want an Australian as our head of state. If that were all we wanted, one of the options to fix it would be an Australian monarchy but, in truth, the problem is more the concept of monarchy itself. The temper of the times is democratic; we are uncomfortable with an office that appoints people by hereditary. In our society in our time we prefer appointment by merit.

Costello supported the 1999 referendum on whether Australia should become a republic.

After the 2001 election, he attracted criticism for not securing funding for a key election promise to extend the Medicare safety net.

In 2002, The Baby bonus scheme was reintroduced by the Federal Government of Australia in the 2002 budget was aimed at offsetting the expenses associated with bearing a child. The scheme was also introduced as a means of increasing Australia's fertility rate and to mitigate the effects of Australia's ageing population. Costello famously had a slogan to encourage Australians to "have one for mum, one for dad and one for the country".

In February 2006, Costello caused controversy during a lecture at the Sydney Institute when questioned about the government's refusal to legally recognise same-sex marriage. He stated, "I think we do recognise the rights of gay and lesbian people in Australia. We do not criminalise [their] conduct or behaviour." He also pointed out that the law was changed in 2004 to recognise same-sex couples with regards to superannuation. He stated that marriage should only be recognised between heterosexual couples. Also during the same speech, Costello criticised "mushy misguided multiculturalism," warning immigrants that the acceptance of Australian values was "not optional."

=== Leadership aspirations ===
==== Under Howard ====
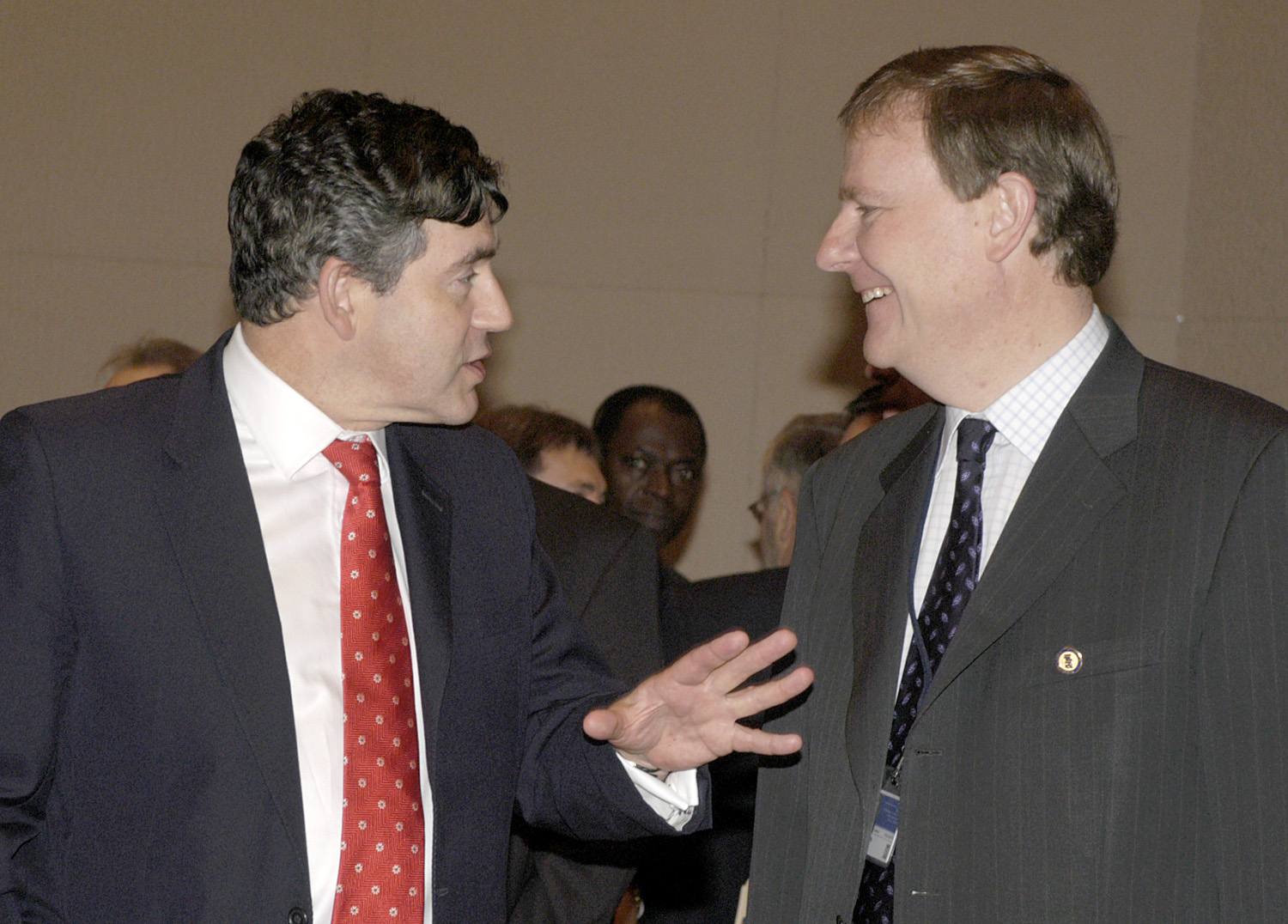
Gordon Brown (left) and Peter Costello (right) at the International Monetary Fund 2002 annual meeting

Costello expected to gain the Liberal leadership some time during Howard's second term as prime minister, as per Howard's alleged December 1994 offer. When this did not eventuate, it is alleged that Costello became frustrated, particularly when Howard announced, in July 2003, his intention to lead the government into the 2004 election.

During the 2004 election campaign, Howard avoided saying whether he would serve a full term if re-elected, saying only he would remain as long as his party supported him. The government's subsequent success in winning control of the Senate raised further speculation that Howard would delay his retirement, and the prospect of a Costello leadership succession appeared to recede.

In July 2006, the alleged Costello/Howard succession deal was made public by Ian McLachlan. Costello confirmed the incident had occurred and that he shared McLachlan's interpretation of events. Howard denied the claims repeatedly, stating the continued public drama displayed "hubris and arrogance" and that the leadership was the party room's to decide, not a prize to be handed over by leaders to successors.

Press Gallery columnist Michelle Grattan described Costello's actions :

Costello doesn't have the numbers to blast John Howard out. But he does have the dirt to make him look bad, and he's throwing it.

Despite tensions between the Prime Minister and the Treasurer, nothing further came of those events. Neither Howard nor Costello took any action to remove the other from office, or resign. However, on 12 September 2007, amid renewed leadership tensions and a series of unfavourable public polls, Howard confirmed he would step aside well into the next term, if re-elected, and that Costello would be his "logical successor".

A federal election was held on 24 November 2007. An exit poll of 2,787 voters by Auspoll, commissioned by Sky News, included a question on the statement "I don’t want Peter Costello to become Prime Minister". Fifty-nine per cent agreed, while 41 per cent disagreed. The Coalition lost the election.

==== In opposition (2007–2009) ====
Costello was widely expected to assume the Liberal leadership after the 2007 election, but the day after the election, in a surprise announcement, he said that he would not seek or accept the leadership or deputy leadership of the Liberal Party. This was after John Howard, in his concession speech on the night of the election, specifically endorsed Costello as the next leader for the Coalition. A week later, he indicated that he would be unlikely to serve out in full his parliamentary term of three years.

However, as opposition leader Brendan Nelson struggled, speculation mounted that Costello would change his mind and seek the leadership. In August 2008, he ruled out challenging Nelson, but did not comment on the prospect of Nelson stepping aside in his favour.

Finally in September 2008, just before the release of his memoirs, The Costello Memoirs, Costello specifically re-confirmed that he would not be seeking leadership of the party and would leave politics at a time that suited him. Media attention immediately shifted to whether Costello's decision cleared the way for a leadership challenge by Malcolm Turnbull (who was the shadow treasurer at the time). Tony Abbott described the decision as a great loss to Australia and to Costello himself, who might continue to have regrets for the rest of his life at what might have been. Media outlets capitalised on Costello's failure to categorically rule out any future leadership challenge. An incumbent-announced leadership spill on the morning of Costello's book release saw Turnbull defeat Nelson. Costello remained as an opposition backbencher. On 18 September 2008, Costello was appointed to the World Bank's new Independent Advisory Board, (IAB), which will provide advice on anti-corruption measures.

On 15 June 2009, Costello announced that he would retire from Parliament at the next Federal election. However on 7 October 2009, Costello announced he would be resigning from Parliament when it resumed later in the month. He resigned on 19 October 2009, triggering the 2009 Higgins by-election. Costello's departure came just prior to the ETS crisis that led to Malcolm Turnbull losing the Liberal party leadership to Tony Abbott.

== Post-political career ==
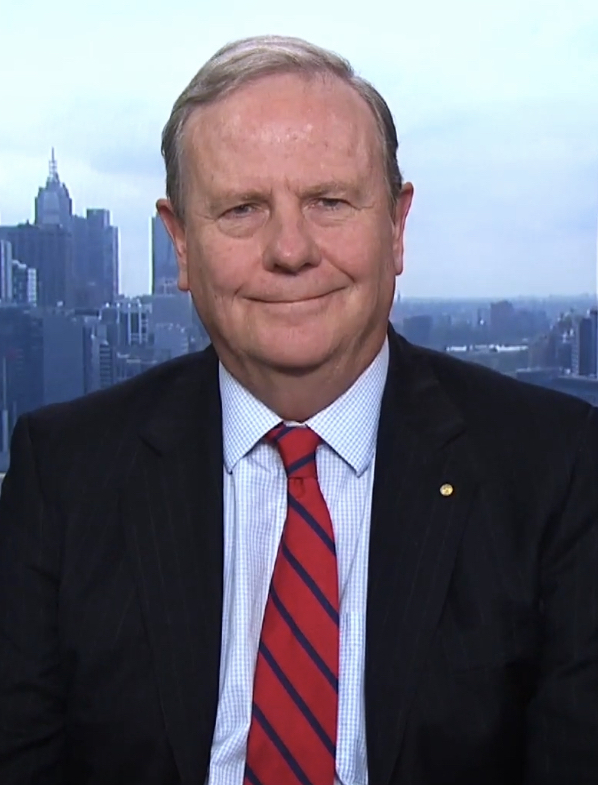
Costello in 2020

Costello was a member of the Board of Guardians of the Australian Government Future Fund from December 2009 until February 2024. Amidst some controversy it was announced that David Gonski would succeed the inaugural Chairman, David Murray when Murray's term expired on 3 April 2012. Gonski's appointment was in spite of an independent review (that was conducted by Gonski). Gonski reported to the Australian Government that the existing Guardians favoured Costello to succeed Murray as Chairman.

Costello is a managing partner of BKK Partners, a boutique corporate advisory run by former Goldman Sachs JBWere managers. He also chairs the advisory board of specialist corporate advisory firm ECG Advisory Solutions.

Costello wrote a regular column for Fairfax newspapers until 2013.

In October 2010, Howard published a memoir, Lazarus Rising, that drew the ire of Costello and others. Howard used the memoir to settle some personal scores, calling Costello "an elitist, who's unable to connect to ordinary Australians" and accused Costello of bungling the leadership handover issue. Costello responded by claiming that Howard "appears to be incapable of taking responsibility for the defeat of the government and for losing his seat of Bennelong."

In May 2012, Michael Kroger accused Costello of being interested in returning to Federal Parliament, most likely by getting a Liberal MP to step aside, with the hope of becoming leader of the Liberal Party. Costello denied this, saying that Kroger had approached him asking to help preserve his ex-wife Helen Kroger's Senate position. At around the same time, Helen Kroger was demoted on the Senate Liberal ticket for Victoria. Kroger believes Costello was targeting her along with others; Kroger also claimed Costello very often criticises past and present Liberal party MPs and officials.

In February 2016, Costello was appointed chairman of Nine Entertainment. He resigned from Nine in June 2024 after allegedly assaulting a reporter at Canberra Airport. Costello denied the assault occurred.

== Honours ==
On 26 January 2011, Peter Costello was appointed a Companion of the Order of Australia (AC) for "eminent service to the Parliament of Australia, particularly through the development of landmark economic policy reforms in the areas of taxation, foreign investment, superannuation and corporate regulation, and through representative roles with global financial organisations".

Parliament of Australia
Preceded by Roger Shipton	Member for Higgins; 1990 – 2009	Succeeded by Kelly O'Dwyer
Political offices
Preceded by Ralph Willis	Treasurer of Australia; 1996 – 2007	Succeeded by Wayne Swan
Party political offices
Preceded by Michael Wooldridge	Deputy Leader of the Liberal Party of Australia; 1994 – 2007	Succeeded by Julie Bishop
