= Margaret Wearne =

Australian trade unionist

Margaret Wearne (9 February 1893 - 31 August 1967) was an Australian trade unionist, known for her work with the confectioners' union and her support of women's unions.

Wearne was born in Eaglehawk, Victoria. Her father, Joseph Wearne, was a miner from Cornwall; her mother, Mary Ann Smith was from Victoria. Wearne was their eighth child.

In 1913, at age 20, Wearne began to work as a confectioner. She worked at MacRobertson's in Fitzroy, Victoria and in 1916 was a founding member of the Female Confectioners' Union.
