= Peter Coleman =

Australian writer and politician (1928–2019)

Peter Coleman AO
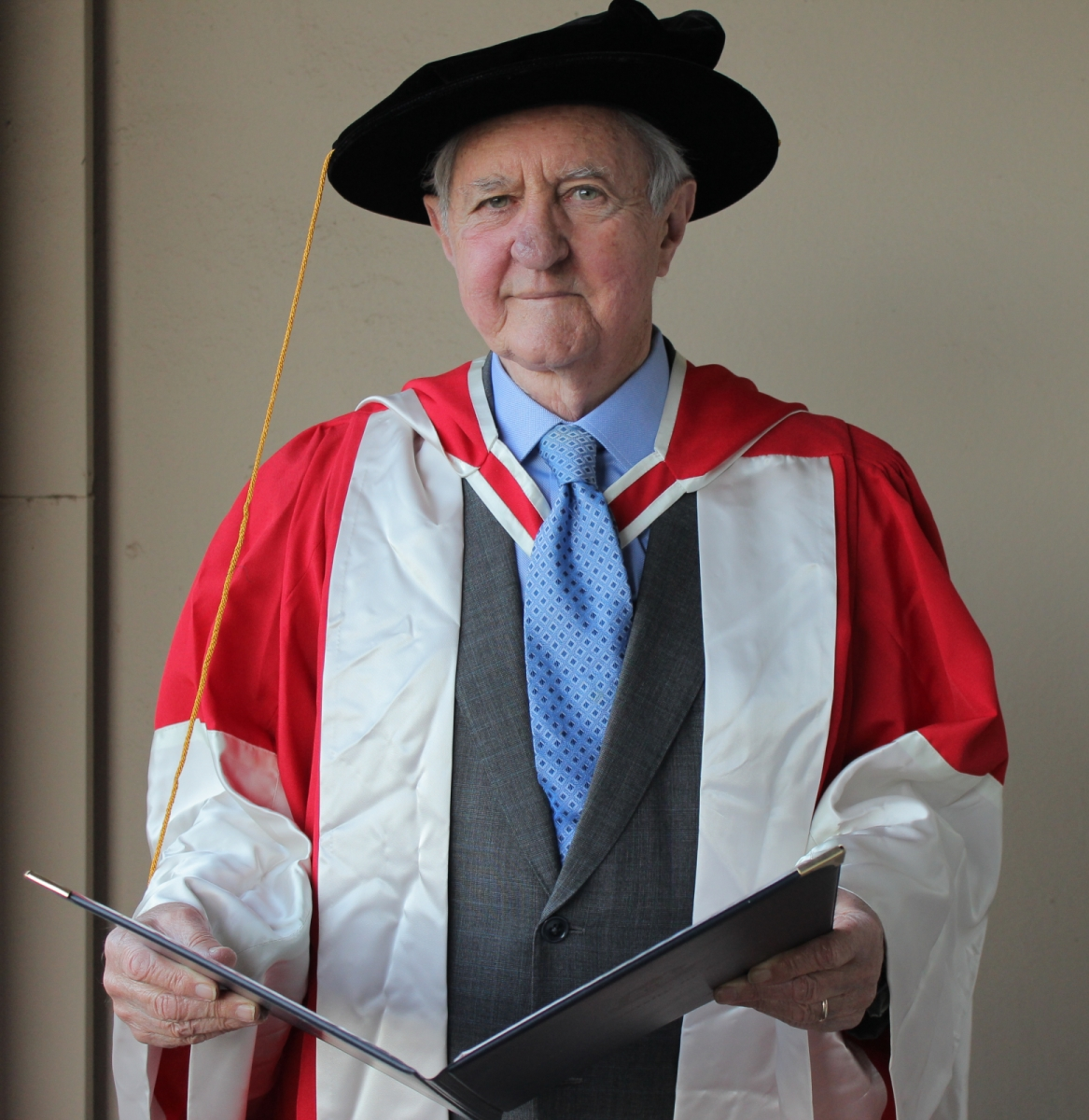
- Coleman in June 2012

30th Leader of the Opposition of New South Wales Elections: 1978
- In office 16 December 1977 – 7 October 1978
- Premier: Neville Wran
- Deputy: John Mason
- Preceded by: Sir Eric Willis
- Succeeded by: John Mason

Member of the New South Wales Parliament for Fuller
- In office 24 February 1968 – 12 September 1978
- Preceded by: New district
- Succeeded by: Rodney Cavalier

Member of the Australian Parliament for Wentworth
- In office 11 April 1981 – 5 June 1987
- Preceded by: Robert Ellicott
- Succeeded by: John Hewson

Personal details
- Born: William Peter Coleman; 15 December 1928 Caulfield, Victoria, Australia
- Died: 31 March 2019 (aged 90) Elizabeth Bay, New South Wales, Australia
- Party: Liberal
- Spouse(s): Verna Susannah Coleman (née Scott)
- Children: Tanya Costello; Ursula Dubosarsky; William Coleman
- Education: University of Sydney; London School of Economics
- Occupation: Writer, journalist

William Peter Coleman AO (15 December 1928 – 31 March 2019) was an Australian writer and politician. A widely published journalist for over 60 years, he was editor of The Bulletin (1964–1967) and of Quadrant for 20 years, and published 16 books on political, biographical and cultural subjects. While still working as an editor and journalist he had a short but distinguished political career as a Member of the New South Wales Legislative Assembly from 1968–1978 for the Liberal Party, serving both as a Minister in the State Cabinet and in the final year as Leader of the New South Wales Opposition. From 1981–1987 he was the member for Wentworth in the Australian House of Representatives.

== Early life ==
Coleman was born in Melbourne, the son of Stanley Charles Coleman, an advertising agent, and Norma Victoria Tiernan. Moving to Sydney, he was educated at North Sydney Boys High School and at the University of Sydney under philosophers John Anderson and John Passmore. Fellow students included the philosophers David Armstrong and David Stove. Coleman then travelled to the United Kingdom to study political philosophy at the London School of Economics under Michael Oakeshott, completing a thesis on the French philosopher Georges Sorel. He graduated as Master of Science (Economics) in 1952. On 5 April 1952 he married the writer and librarian, Verna Scott. Together they had two daughters, Tanya, who became a lawyer and later wife of Deputy Liberal Leader Peter Costello, Ursula, a children's writer, and a son William, who is an economist.

After teaching English for a year in the Sudan, Coleman returned to Australia to undertake a career as a journalist. In 1958 he became associate editor of The Observer, a fortnightly magazine founded in 1958 and published by Australian Consolidated Press. Other staff members included the editor Donald Horne and financial editor Michael Baume. In 1961 it was absorbed by the legendary but ailing political and literary magazine The Bulletin and Coleman subsequently became editor of The Bulletin between 1964 and 1967. In these years he published his first books Australian Civilization, a symposium which brought together writers and critics ranging from Manning Clark and Max Harris to James McAuley and Vincent Buckley; Obscenity Blasphemy Sedition, a study of the first 100 years of censorship in Australia; the anthology The Bulletin Book; and Cartoons of Australian History, with cartoonist Les Tanner. When Coleman resigned from The Bulletin in 1967 he became editor of Quadrant magazine, a position he held for twenty years.

== Political life ==
In 1968 Coleman was elected the Liberal member for Fuller, a marginal seat taking in North Ryde, Gladesville and Hunters Hill, in the New South Wales Legislative Assembly, defeating the Labor Member Frank Downing. Originally serving on the backbench, Coleman gained experience through his appointment as a member of the Australian Council for the Arts from 1968 to 1973, a councillor of the National Institute of Dramatic Art from 1970 to 1985, and as Chairman of the Interim Council of the National Film & Television School from 1971 to 1973. In 1974, Coleman became the Chairman of the Select Committee into Appointment of Judges to the High Court, which examined different judicial appointment methods prior to the 1977 Federal Referendum.

Coleman was then further promoted in June 1975 as the Parliamentary Secretary to the Premier Tom Lewis, in which capacity he served only five months until his promotion to Cabinet. He was made a Minister of the Crown in October 1975 as the Assistant Treasurer and Minister for Revenue. When Sir Eric Willis became Premier, Coleman was appointed to the revived office of Chief Secretary from January 1976. He served in Cabinet until the defeat of the Willis government in the May 1976 election, at which he retained his seat on a slightly increased margin of 52%.

In opposition under Eric Willis, Coleman served as the Shadow Minister for Justice and Services. On 15 December 1977 four party MPs declared that they would oppose Willis in a leadership ballot the next day. On 16 December 1977, Willis resigned and Coleman was elected as the leader by the party. At the 1978 election, Coleman and the Coalition campaigned on a platform based around the spectre of "Whitlamism" and attempted to undermine the strong central leadership of Wran. This failed to resonate with voters, and the election, which was later termed the "Wranslide", saw a massive defeat for the Opposition Coalition. Coleman himself lost his seat of Fuller to Hunter's Hill Municipal Council Alderman, Rodney Cavalier, a result that had been anticipated by some.

In September 1979, Coleman was appointed as Administrator of Norfolk Island. Following the resignation of Robert Ellicott, he gained Liberal Party pre-selection for the federal seat of Wentworth and was elected in a by-election in April 1981. He retired from parliament before the 1987 election and resumed his literary career.

== Post-politics ==
On leaving politics, Coleman resumed his career as a full-time writer, publishing widely both journalism and books, including a major history of the intellectuals and the Cold War, The Liberal Conspiracy. The Congress for Cultural Freedom and the Struggle for the Mind of Postwar Europe and biographical works on the Australian poet James McAuley, comic artist Barry Humphries, film director Bruce Beresford and economist Heinz Arndt. He also published a selection of poetry, a cookbook and a collection of his Quadrant essays, The Last Intellectuals. In 2008 Coleman assisted his son-in-law, Peter Costello, in writing and editing his account of his career: The Costello Memoirs: The Age of Prosperity.

During this period he also recorded interviews, held by the National Library of Australia as part of the oral history project, with leading Australian figures in journalism, arts, law, economics, philosophy and politics, including Hugh Atkinson, Garfield Barwick, Bruce Beresford, Jim Carlton, Madge Eddy, Charles Higham, Kenneth Jacobs, Eugene Kamenka, Michael Kirby, Kenneth Minogue, Barry Oakley, Desmond O'Grady, Clyde Packer, John Passmore, Peter Porter, Adrian Rawlins and Amy Witting. He was a regular contributor to the Australian edition of The Spectator with a weekly column entitled 'Australian Notes' and also contributed to The Australian and ABC programs. Coleman died on 31 March 2019.

== Honours ==
In 2001 Coleman was awarded the Centenary Medal. In 2008 he was admitted to the degree of Doctor of Letters (honoris causa) at the University of Sydney for services to Australian intellectual life. On 8 June 2015 he was made an Officer of the Order of Australia (AO) "for distinguished service to the print media industry as a noted editor, journalist, biographer and author, to the Parliaments of Australia and New South Wales, and to the community".

== Bibliography ==
=== Books ===
- Coleman, Peter (1984). Memoirs of a Slow Learner. Pymble: Angus and Robertson. ISBN 0-207-18248-5. Republished (2015) Connor Court Publishing Ballarat ISBN 9781925138269
- Coleman, Peter (1963). Obscenity Blasphemy Sedition: 100 Years of Censorship in Australia. Brisbane: Jacaranda. Republished (2000) by Duffy & Snellgrove, Sydney ISBN 1875989722
- Coleman, Peter; Les Tanner (1967). Cartoons of Australian history. Melbourne: Thomas Nelson. ISBN 0-17-005275-3. Republished (1973) ISBN 0170019675 Republished (1978) enlarged edition ISBN 0170052753
- Coleman, Peter; Wendy Bacon (1975). Censorship. Melbourne: Heinemann. ISBN 0858591375.
- Coleman, Peter (1980). The heart of James McAuley: life and work of the Australian poet. Sydney: Wildcat Press. ISBN 0-908463-05-7. Republished (2006) Connor Court Publishing ISBN 9780975801567
- Coleman, Peter (1989). The Liberal Conspiracy. The Congress for Cultural Freedom and the Struggle for the Mind of Postwar Europe. New York: The Free Press (Macmillan). ISBN 0-02-906481-3. Preface
- Coleman, Peter (1990). The Real Barry Humphries. London: Robson. Chapter One "A bit of Stick"
- Coleman, Peter (1992). Bruce Beresford: Instincts of the Heart. Sydney: Angus & Robertson.
- —, ed. (1996). Double take : six incorrect essays. Melbourne: Mandarin.
- Coleman, Peter; Selwyn Cornish; Peter Drake (2007). Arndt's Story: the life of an Australian economist. Canberra: Asia Pacific Press. ISBN 9780731538102.
- Coleman, Peter; Peter Costello (2008). The Costello Memoirs. Melbourne: Melbourne University Press. ISBN 978-0-522-85582-1.
- Coleman, Peter (2010). The Last Intellectuals: Essays on Writers and Politics. Sydney: Quadrant Books.

Books edited

- Coleman, Peter, ed. (1962). Australian Civilization: A Symposium. Melbourne: F.W.Cheshire. Introduction
- Coleman, Peter, ed. (1966). The Bulletin Book: A Selection from the 1960s. Melbourne: F.W.Cheshire.
- Coleman, Peter; James McAuley, eds. (1970). Vietnam: After the Moratorium. Sydney: H.R.Krygier.
- Coleman, Peter; Lee Shrubb, Vivian Smith, eds. (1982). Quadrant, Twenty five years. St Lucia Queensland: University of Queensland Press. ISBN 0-07-022182-0.
- Coleman, Peter, ed. (1996). The Old Boys' Cookbook. Melbourne: William Heinemann.
- Coleman, Peter; et al., eds. (2000). A Return to Poetry (Anthology). Sydney: Duffy & Snellgrove.

=== Official reports ===
- Coleman, Peter (1970). Report on visits to foreign film & television schools, January 9 – February 7, 1970. Canberra: Film and Television School (Australia) Interim Council.
- Coleman, Peter, chairman (1976). Report from the Select Committee of the Legislative Assembly upon the appointment of Judges to the High Court of Australia, NSW Parliamentary Paper no. 53 1975. Sydney: NSW Government Printer.

=== Essays, interviews, chapters, lectures ===
- 'An Interview with Peter Coleman' Frank Devine, Quadrant May 2006
- ‘A Political Formation or No Roads to Damascus' (Cheshire 1963) in Australian Politics. A Third Reader edited by Henry Mayer and Helen Nelson.
- 'Ballade of Lost Phrases: James McAuley' from The Last Intellectuals: Essays on Writers and Politics, Quadrant Books, 2010.
- 'Conservative without a Cause? Andrew Norton Talks with Peter Coleman.' Policy Autumn 1995.
- ‘From Fellow Travelling to Political Correctness' Political Correctness in South Africa edited by Rainer Erkens and John Kane-Berman. South African Institute of Race Relations, 2000.
- 'How I wrote 'The Liberal Conspiracy' from The Last Intellectuals: Essays on Writers and Politics, Quadrant Books, 2010.
- 'I Thought of Archimedes' from The Last Intellectuals: Essays on Writers and Politics, Quadrant Books, 2010.
- ‘Leaves from the Diary of a Madman' in Confessions and Memoirs edited by Michael Wilding and David Myers. Central Queensland University Press, 2006.
- ‘Political Cartoonists', 'Political Correctness', 'Political Journalists'
- The Oxford Companion to Australian Politics edited by Brian Galligan and Winsome Roberts, Oxford University Press, 2007.
- Preface to Cricket versus Republicanism and other Essays (1995) Quakers Hill Press, 1995.
- Preface and 'The Santamaria Story' The Bulletin Book. A Selection from the 1960s Angus and Robertson, 1963.
- 'The Patron State' Bert Kelly Lecture, 1995.
- 'The Phoney Debate' from Australia and the Monarchy: A Symposium, edited by Geoffrey Dutton, Sun Books, Melbourne, 1966.
- 'The Sad and Noble Music of Michael Oakeshott' from The Last Intellectuals: Essays on Writers and Politics, Quadrant Books, 2010.
- 'The Usual Suspects. Quadrant at 50' Martin Krygier. The Monthly December 2006.

=== Critical studies and reviews of Coleman's work ===
- Robinson, Geoffrey (8 November 2022) "From Georges Sorel to Peter Costello: Peter Coleman and the Making of Australian Liberal Conservatism" Australian Journal of Politics and History 68(3) 447-466 https://doi.org/10.1111/ajph.12803=
- Martyr, Philippa (May 1996). "Civilised disagreement". Quadrant. 40 (5): 80–81. Review of Double take.

New South Wales Legislative Assembly
New district	Member for Fuller; 1968 – 1978	Succeeded by Rodney Cavalier
Political offices
Preceded by Max Ruddock	Assistant Treasurer; 1975 – 1976	Succeeded by Max Ruddock
Preceded by Max Ruddock	Minister for Revenue; 1975 – 1976	Succeeded by Max Ruddock
Vacant Title last held by Ian Griffith	Chief Secretary; 1976	Vacant Title next held by Garry West
Preceded by Sir Eric Willis	Leader of the Opposition of New South Wales; 1977 – 1978	Succeeded by John Mason
Party political offices
Preceded by Sir Eric Willis	Leader of the New South Wales Liberal Party; 1977 – 1978	Succeeded by John Mason
Government offices
Preceded by Desmond Vincent O'Leary	Administrator of Norfolk Island; 1979 – 1981	Succeeded by Ian Hutchinson
Parliament of Australia
Preceded by Robert Ellicott	Member for Wentworth; 1981 – 1987	Succeeded by John Hewson
