= Ivan Petch =

Australian politician (1939–2026)

Member of the New South Wales Parliament for Gladesville
- In office 19 March 1988 – 3 March 1995
- Preceded by: Rodney Cavalier
- Succeeded by: John Watkins

Alderman of the Ryde Municipal Council
- In office 17 September 1977 – 26 September 1987

Councillor of the Ryde City Council
- In office 9 September 1995 – 1 December 2014
- Succeeded by: Jan Stott

Councillor of the Sydney County Council for the 4th Constituency
- In office 5 November 1980 – 6 June 1984 Serving with Noel Reidy
- Preceded by: Innes Haviland; John Merrington
- Succeeded by: Michael Lardelli

Personal details
- Born: 1 March 1939 Concord, New South Wales, Australia
- Died: 6 July 2026 (aged 87) Concord, New South Wales, Australia
- Party: Independent (1995–2026); Liberal Party (1988–1995)
- Spouse: Ann Petch
- Children: 3 males; 3 females
- Profession: Promoter

Ivan John Petch (1 March 1939 – 6 July 2026) was an Australian politician who was a member of the New South Wales Legislative Assembly, representing the electorate of Gladesville for the Liberal Party between 1988 and 1995. He served as a Councillor for the Ryde City Council including a term as Mayor between 2012 and 2013.

== Background ==
Born in Concord, New South Wales on 1 March 1939, Petch attended Putney Primary School and Fort Street Boys High School before receiving his tertiary education in electrical engineering and music at Sydney Technical College. He held various positions, including professional musician, electrical engineering consultant, company managing director (Independent Promotions Pty Ltd), and a licensed electrical contractor. He joined the Liberal Party in 1975.

Petch died in Concord on 6 July 2026, at the age of 87.

== Political career ==
In 1977, Petch was elected to Ryde Municipal Council, and from 1980 to 1987 he also sat on Sydney County Council, of which he was chairman in 1984 and 1985. From 1984 to 1987 he was an executive member of the Local Government Association. He was active in the Ryde local area as Chairman of the Ryde "Red Cross Calling" Appeal 1978–84, President of the Ryde Lions Club 1985–86, and honorary member of the North Ryde Rotary Club, from which he received a Paul Harris Fellow award. He was also appointed a Knight of the Order of St Lazarus of Jerusalem.

In 1988, Petch was elected to the New South Wales Legislative Assembly as the Liberal member for Gladesville. He held the seat until 1995, when he was defeated by Labor candidate and future Deputy Premier John Watkins. Gladesville was later abolished in 1999 and replaced by Ryde and Petch contested the 1999 and 2007 state elections as an independent candidate for Ryde, but was defeated both in a rematch against Watkins.

=== Corruption ===
On 30 June 2014, the Independent Commission Against Corruption issued findings that Petch had acted corruptly during his 2012/13 term as Mayor. Petch rejected the findings, confirming he was launching legal action in the NSW Supreme Court and said it "beggars belief" that ICAC could accuse him of acting corruptly "after 37 years of representing the residents honestly and sincerely". On 28 November 2014, the Supreme Court of New South Wales dismissed Petch's challenge. Petch resigned from the Ryde City Council with effect from 1 December 2014.

In October 2018, a 12-person jury found Petch guilty of "making an unwarranted demand with menaces" while he was Ryde mayor in May 2013, by suggesting the council's then acting general manager might not get a permanent job unless she made a decision favouring his financial interests. He avoided jail time but would serve a supervised two-year corrections order in the community. NSW District Court Judge Nicole Noman said on Monday the former mayor's behaviour conveyed "a sense of entitlement" and a "preparedness to manipulate others for his advantage".

In December 2019, Petch was sentenced to a 18-month imprisonment for lying to the Independent Commission Against Corruption during both private and public hearings in 2013.

Government offices
Preceded by Noel Reidy	Chairman of the Sydney County Council; 1984–1985	Succeeded by George Moore
New South Wales Legislative Assembly
Preceded by Rodney Cavalier	Member for Gladesville; 1988–1995	Succeeded by John Watkins
Civic offices
Preceded by Edna Wilde	Mayor of Ryde; 2000–2002	Succeeded by Edna Wilde
Preceded by Terry Perram	Mayor of Ryde; 2005–2008	Succeeded by Vic Tagg
Preceded by Artin Etmekdjian	Mayor of Ryde; 2012–2013	Succeeded by Roy Maggio
