= Electoral district of Fuller =

Former state electoral district of New South Wales, Australia

Fuller was an electoral district of the Legislative Assembly in the Australian state of New South Wales, created in 1968 in the Ryde area and named after George Fuller, Premier of New South Wales, 1922–1925. It was abolished in 1981 and largely replaced by Gladesville.

== Members for Fuller ==
Member	Party	Period
Peter Coleman	Liberal	1968–1978
Rodney Cavalier	Labor	1978–1981

== Election results ==
1978 New South Wales state election: Fuller
Party	Candidate	Votes	%	±%
Labor	Rodney Cavalier	16,049	53.3	+9.0
Liberal	Peter Coleman	12,470	41.4	−10.8
Democrats	Shirley Berg	1,569	5.2	+5.2
Total formal votes		30,088	98.2	−0.5
Informal votes		551	1.8	+0.5
Turnout		30,639	93.8	+0.1
Two-party-preferred result
Labor	Rodney Cavalier	16,638	55.3	+8.7
Liberal	Peter Coleman	13,450	44.7	−8.7
Labor gain from Liberal		Swing	+8.7	
