= Alan Goldberg (judge) =

Australian judge

The Honourable Alan Goldberg AO, QC

Judge of the Federal Court of Australia
- In office 3 February 1997 – 4 July 2010

Personal details
- Born: Alan Henry Goldberg; 7 August 1940
- Died: 23 July 2016 (aged 75) Melbourne, Australia
- Spouse: Rachel Rynderman (m. 1967)
- Education: University of Melbourne; Yale University; Swinburne University of Technology

Alan Henry Goldberg AO, QC (7 August 1940 – 23 July 2016) was an Australian jurist, who served as a judge of the Federal Court of Australia from 3 February 1997 to 4 July 2010.
