= Rodney Cavalier =

Australian politician

The Honourable Rodney Cavalier AO

Minister for Education
- In office 5 April 1984 – 25 March 1988
- Premier: Neville Wran; Barrie Unsworth
- Preceded by: Eric Bedford
- Succeeded by: Terry Metherell

Minister for Energy Minister for Finance
- In office 10 February 1984 – 5 April 1984
- Premier: Neville Wran
- Preceded by: Terry Sheahan
- Succeeded by: Peter Cox (Energy); Bob Debus (Finance)

Member of the New South Wales Parliament for Gladesville
- In office 19 September 1981 – 22 February 1988
- Preceded by: New district
- Succeeded by: Ivan Petch

Member of the New South Wales Parliament for Fuller
- In office 7 October 1978 – 28 August 1981
- Preceded by: Peter Coleman
- Succeeded by: District abolished

Alderman of the Municipality of Hunter's Hill
- In office 17 September 1977 – 10 September 1980

Personal details
- Born: Rodney Mark Cavalier; 11 October 1948 (age 78) Sydney, Australia
- Party: Labor Party
- Domestic partner: Sally
- Children: Alison (born 1992), Nicholas (born 1995)
- Education: Fort Street Boys' High School; The University of Sydney

Rodney Mark Cavalier AO (born 11 October 1948) is a former Australian politician, statutory officer and author. Cavalier was a member of the New South Wales Legislative Assembly representing Fuller between 1978 and 1981 and then Gladesville between 1981 and 1988 for the Labor Party. During his term in parliament, Cavalier was Minister for Energy, Minister for Finance, and Minister for Education in the Wran and Unsworth governments.

== Biography ==
Cavalier's father was of Italian extraction, originally surnamed Frank Cavallari, his mother of Scottish background, named Elizabeth. He grew up in the Sydney suburb of Putney, attending the local public school before moving to Fort Street Boys' High School and the University of Sydney, where he studied government and became increasingly involved in left-wing politics. His father, Frank Cavalier, was an architect and designed the family home in Lloyd Avenue, Hunter's Hill, in the Sydney School Modernist style in 1969. Cavalier worked for the Australia Council, for the Miscellaneous Workers' Union, as an aide to Whitlam minister Clyde Cameron, and was an alderman on Hunter's Hill Council.

In 1978 he was elected member for the state seat of Fuller, representing the Australian Labor Party. He famously unseated Opposition Leader Peter Coleman in his own electorate amid that year's massive Labor landslide. Fuller was abolished in 1981, and Cavalier followed most of his constituents into Gladesville, which he held until his retirement.

He served as Minister for Education from 1984 to 1988 in the Neville Wran and Barrie Unsworth governments. He was noted for his abrasive personality, reformist zeal and intolerance of sloppy work. One left-wing Teachers' Federation activist described him as "the rudest, most pugnacious individual to hold office". Though the President of the Federation, after he lost office, noted that Cavalier "had a genuine commitment to public education". He lost office, and his seat, in 1988, and subsequently declined an offer to return to State Parliament in the seat of Granville or by way of the Legislative Council.

A Fellow of the University of Sydney, he was chairman of the Australian Language and Literacy Council (1991–1996). He was also deputy chairman of the National Council for the Centenary of Federation (1997–2001) and chairman of the Sesquicentenary of Responsible Government in NSW (2002–2006): two bodies which published over 60 books on various aspects of Australian history and culture. He was a member of the Council of the National Library of Australia (1989–1998) and a member of the Council of the State Library of New South Wales (2013–2015).

Cavalier is an book collector and cricketer and his appointment to the Sydney Cricket Ground Trust fulfilled his longtime ambition. He was a trustee (1996–2014) and chairman (2001–2014). At the completion of this, record, term the Trust made him a Life Member. He is also an Honorary Life Member of the Marylebone Cricket Club.

He is currently the chairman of the C.E.W. Bean Foundation and the Southern Zone of Country Cricket New South Wales.

Cavalier has published widely on governors, the workings of cabinet, premiers, political cartoons, the uses of diaries and has also published extensively on the subject of cricket. He has also been the editor of the monthly newsletter of the Southern Highlands Branch of the Australian Labor Party.

In January 2001 he was presented with the Centenary Medal for "service to Australian society and the Centenary of Federation". In January 2004, he was appointed an Officer of the Order of Australia (AO) for "service to the community as a contributor to a range of cultural, literary and sporting organisations, to education and training, and to the New South Wales Parliament". In June 2008, he was awarded a Doctor of the university (honoris causa) by the University of Technology, Sydney.

He now resides in Bowral, New South Wales with his family.

== Published works ==
- Cavalier, R. M. (Rodney Mark); Australasian Study of Parliament Group (1989), The press of men (and women), the men (and women) of the press, the weight of history : seminar on parliamentary performance and portrayal, Australasian Study of Parliament Group
- Power crisis: the self-destruction of a state Labor Party (paperback). Cambridge: Cambridge University Press. 2010. p. 202. ISBN 978-0-521-13832-1.
- Bronzed: the Basil Sellers SCG sports sculptures project (cloth). Sydney: Sydney Cricket Ground Trust. 2013. p. 240. ISBN 978 0 64659 143 8.
- "Political cartoons and The Bulletin" in Lin Bloomfield (Ed.), The World of Norman Lindsay (Macmillan 1979), 9.
- "Labor Prepares for Government" in Ernie Chaples, Helen Nelson and Ken Turner (Eds.), The Wran Model: Electoral Politics in New South Wales 1981 and 1984 (Oxford University Press 1985), 20.
- "The Australian Labor Party at Branch Level: Guildford, Hunters Hill and Panania Branches in the 1950s" in Whitlam et al., A Century of Social Change: Labor History Essays Volume Four (Pluto Press 1992), 92.
- "An Insider on the Outside: A Personal View Of Why Labor Was Always Going To Lose The 1996 Federal Election" in Clive Bean, Marian Simms, Scott Bennett & John Warhurst (Eds.), The Politics of Retribution: The 1996 Federal Election (Allen & Unwin 1997), 23–33.
- "Exploring Frontiers" in Mike Coward (Ed.), Sir Donald Bradman A.C. (Ironbark Legends 1998)
- "Campaign Commentary" in Marian Simms & John Warhurst (Eds.), Howard's Agenda: The 1998 Australian Election (University of Queensland Press 2000), 91–96.
- "Reflections" in Marian Simms and John Warhurst (Eds.) 2001 Federal Election
- "Business as Usual: Sport before and after Federation", Commonwealth of Yarns: Stories of Nation Building Conference, Canberra, December 2001
- "The defeat of Labor: As bad as it gets" in Marian Simms and John Warhurst (Eds.), Mortgage Nation: the 2004 Australian Election (API Network 2005)
- "The Split in the Branches: Hunters Hill, NSW" in Brian Costar, Peter Love and Paul Strangio (Eds.), The Great Labor Schism: A retrospective (Scribe 2005)
- "The Wran Cabinet" in Troy Bramston (Ed.), The Wran Era (Federation Press 2006)
- "Barrie John Unsworth" in David Clune and Ken Turner (Eds.), The Premiers of New South Wales Volume 2: 1901-2005(Federation Press 2006)
- "Jack Ferguson: representing workers" in Ken Turner and Michael Hogan (Eds.), The Worldly Art of Politics (Federation Press 2006)
- "Using Diaries and Memoirs" in David Clune and Ken Turner (Eds.), Writing Party History: Papers from a seminar held at Parliament House, Sydney, May 2006 (Parliament of New South Wales 2007)
- "Gordon Jacob Samuels" in David Clune and Ken Turner (Eds.), The Governors of New South Wales 1788-2010 (Federation Press 2009)
- "Bad governments lose: surely there is no mystery there" in Marian Simms and John Wanna (Eds.), Julia 2010: The caretaker election (ANU E press 2012)
- "The Labor Party" in David Clune and Rodney Smith (Eds.), From Carr to Keneally: Labor in office in NSW 1995-2011(Allen & Unwin 2012)
- "A war I did not know about that influenced me so much" in Ann Curthoys and Joy Damousi (Eds.), What did you do in the Cold War, Daddy? Personal stories from a troubled time (NewSouth 2014)
- "Grace and natural style, memory, fine writing: a living force that is the legacy of Vic", in Ronald Cardwell (Ed.), The Life and Times of the Immortal Victor Trumper (Cricket Publishing Company 2015)
- "A certain mystique" in Norman Tasker and Ian Heads (Eds.), Richie: The man behind the Legend (Stoke Hill Press 2015)

New South Wales Legislative Assembly
Preceded by Peter Coleman	Member for Fuller; 1978 – 1981	District abolished
New district	Member for Gladesville; 1981 – 1988	Succeeded by Ivan Petch
Political offices
Preceded by Terry Sheahan	Minister for Energy; 1984	Succeeded by Peter Cox as Minister for Mineral Resources and Energy
Preceded by Terry Sheahan	Minister for Finance; 1984	Succeeded by Bob Debus
Preceded by Eric Bedford	Minister for Education; 1984 – 1988	Succeeded by Terry Metherell
