= Broken Hill =

- City
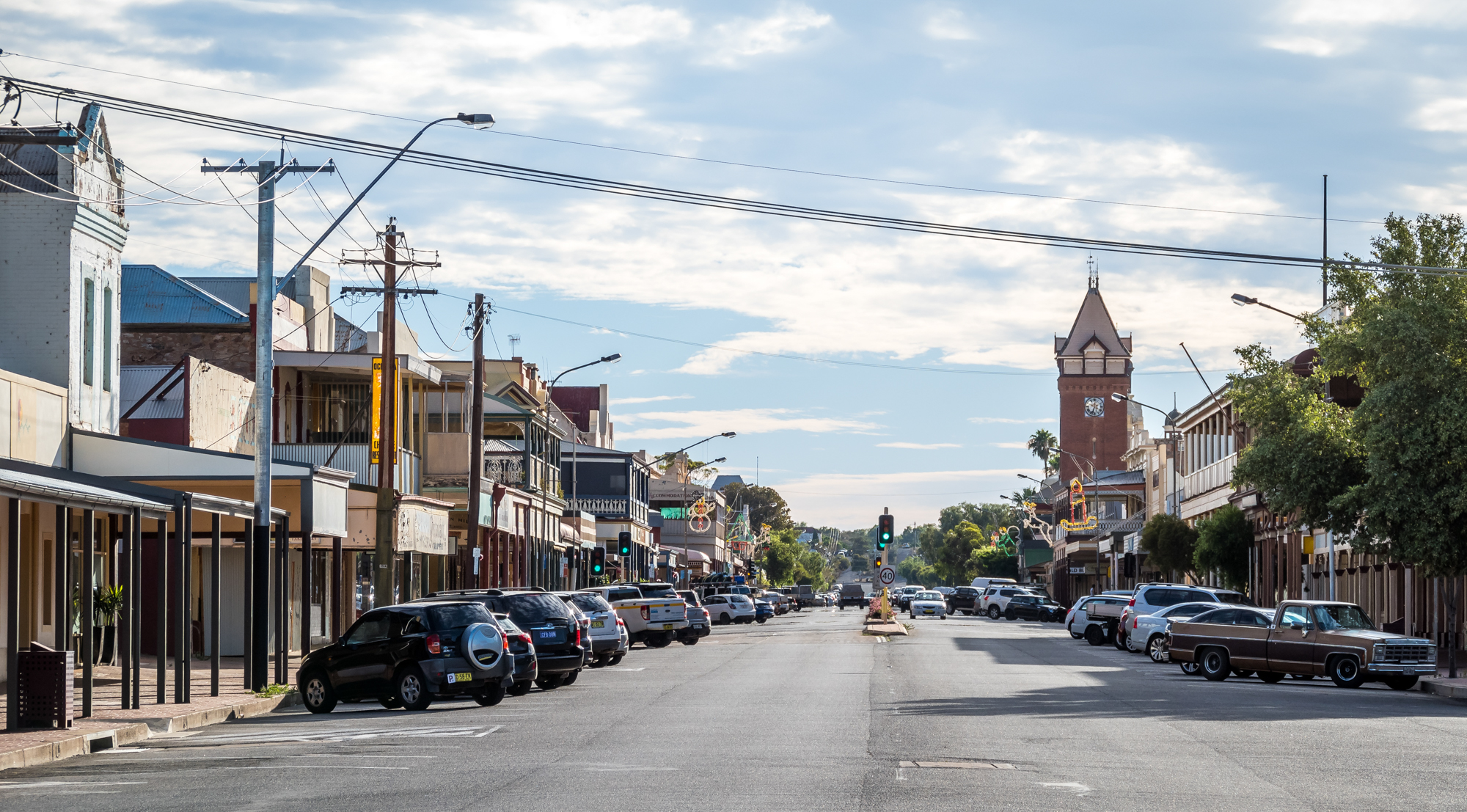
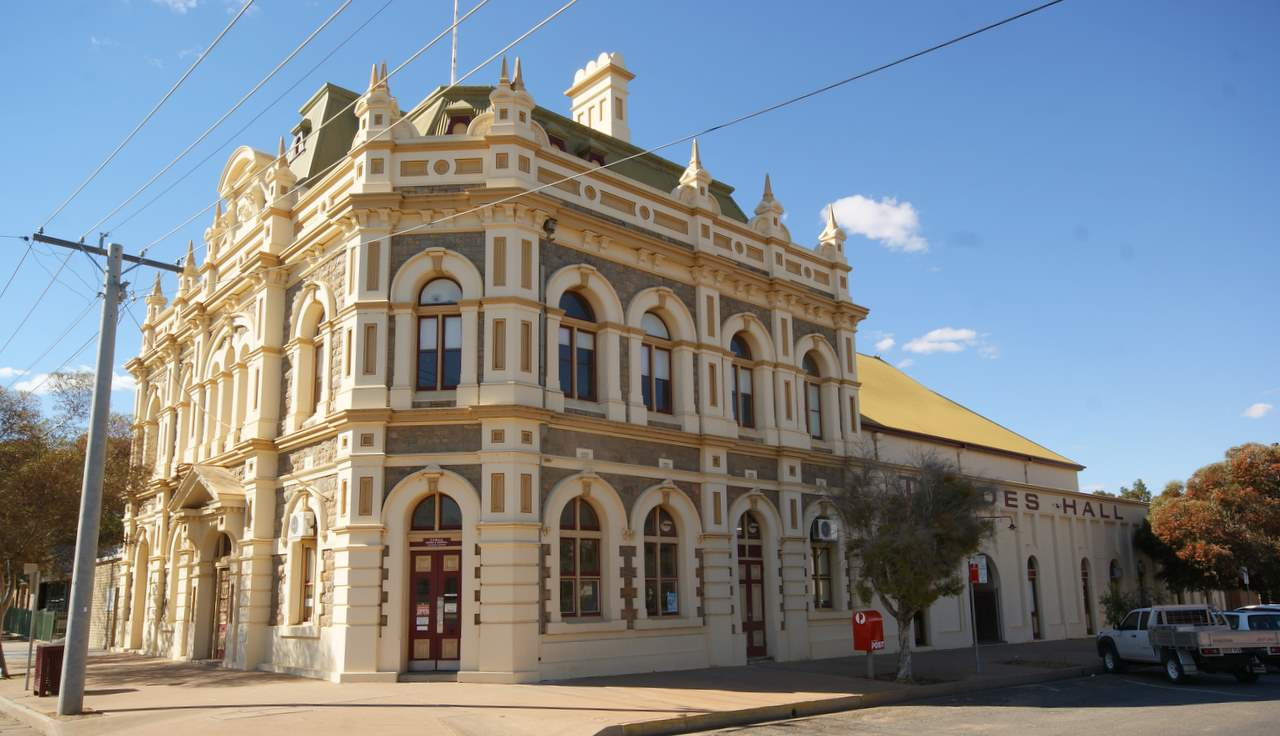
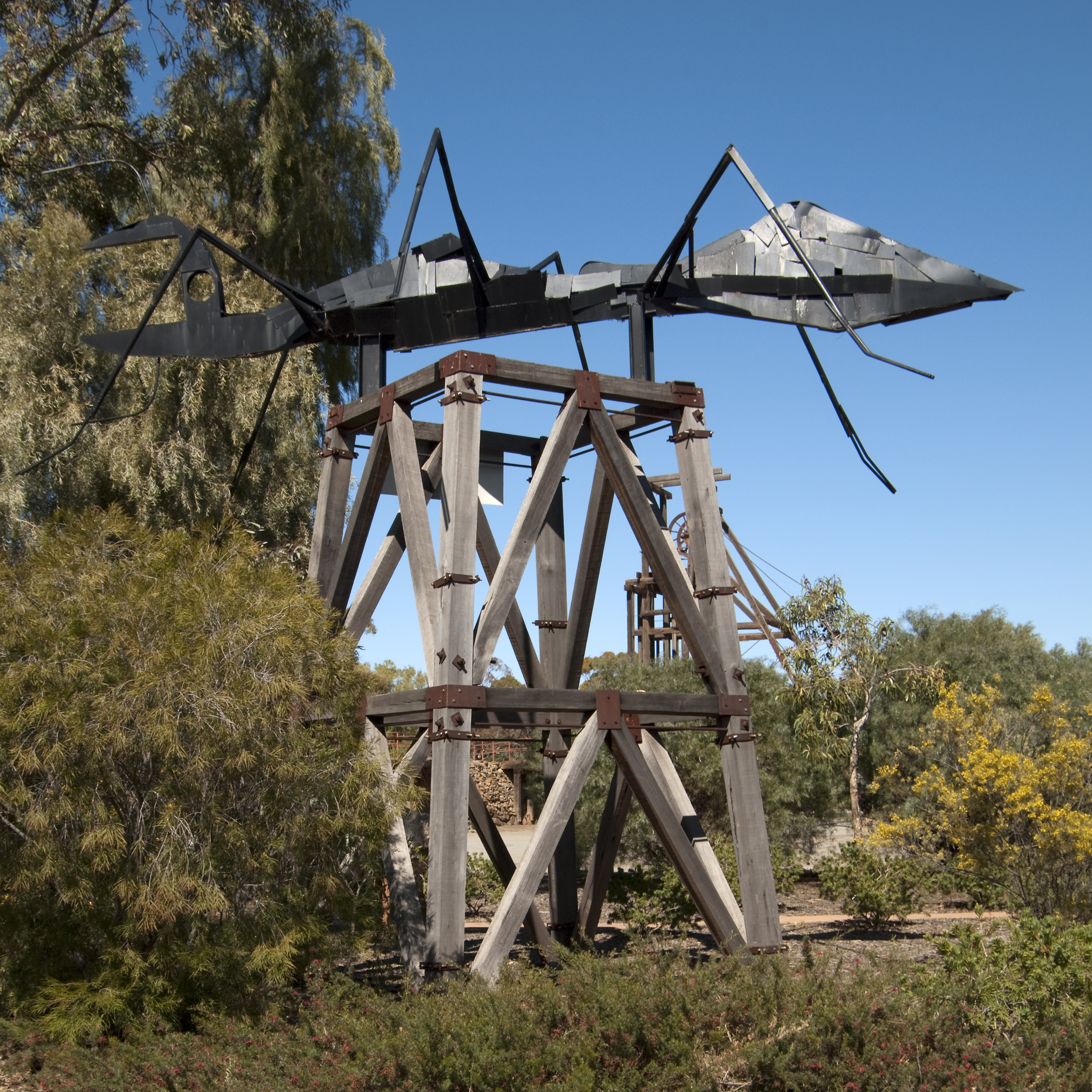
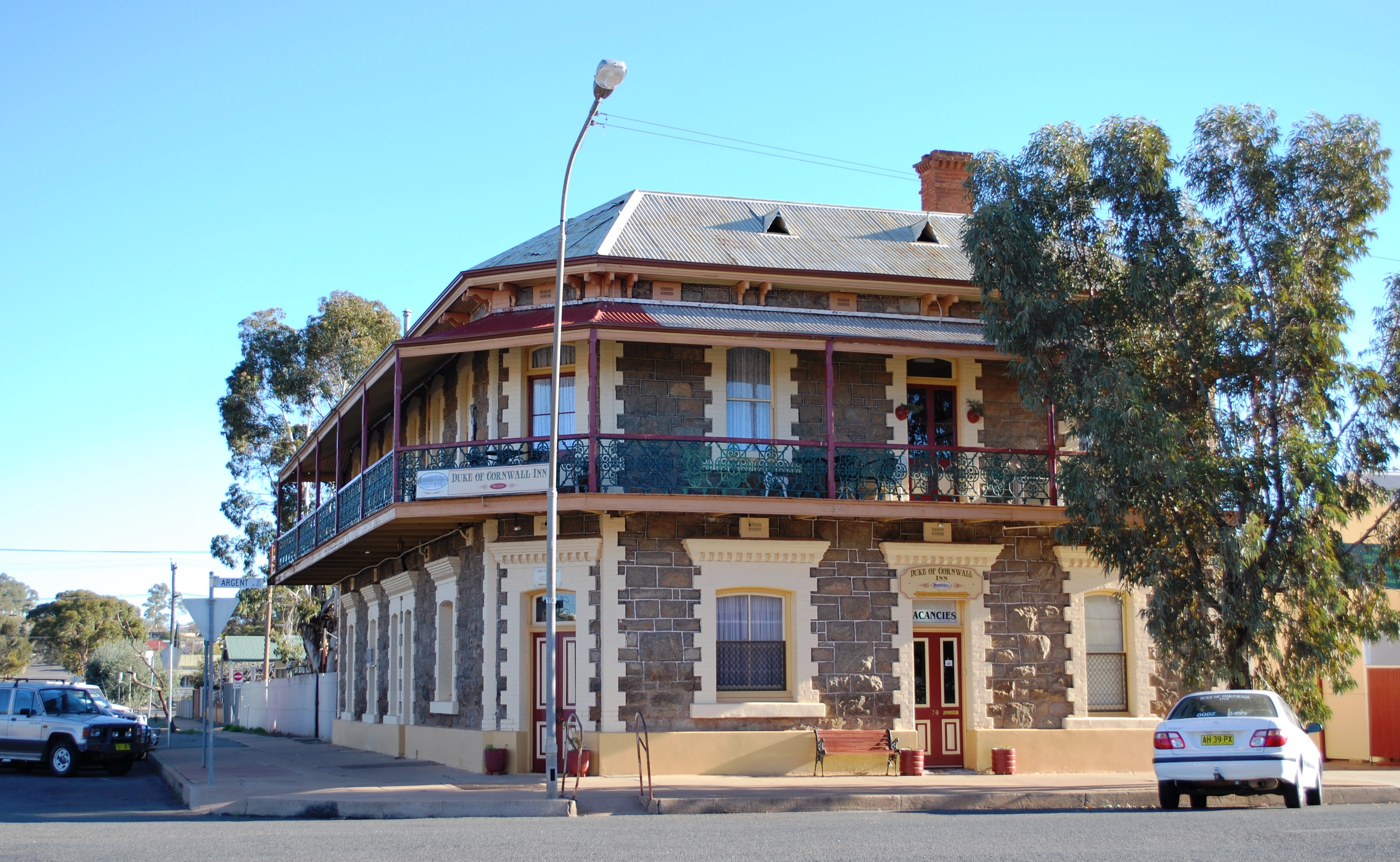
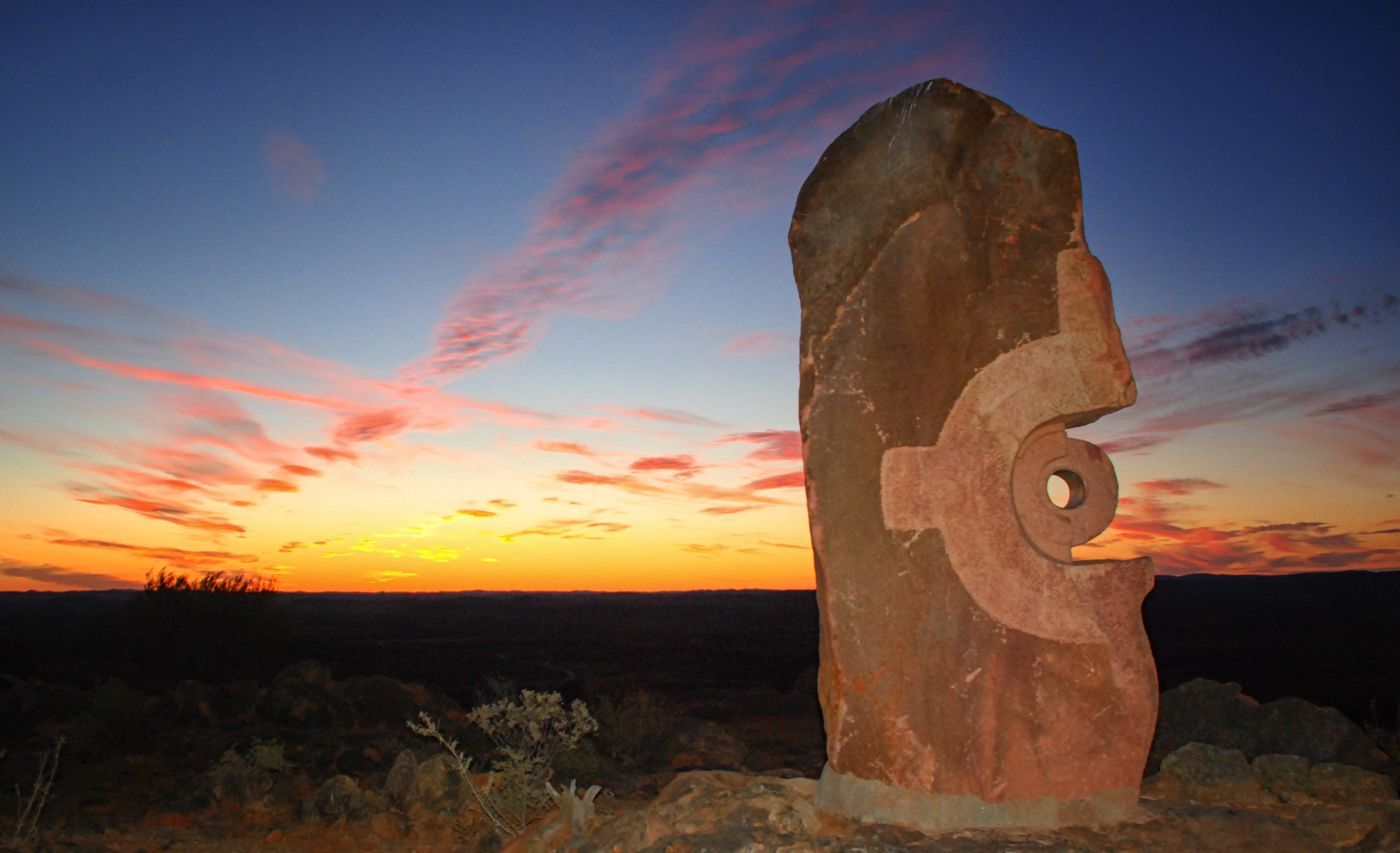
- Broken Hill City Centre on Argent Street Trades Hall Big Ant Duke of Cornwall Hotel Broken Hill Sculptures

- Coordinates: 31°57′S 141°28′E
- Country: Australia
- State: New South Wales
- LGAs: City of Broken Hill; Unincorporated Far West Region
- Location: 1,143 km (710 mi) west of Sydney; 511 km (318 mi) north east of Adelaide; 837 km (520 mi) north west of Melbourne; 296 km (184 mi) north of Mildura; 753 km (468 mi) west of Dubbo
- Established: 1883

Government
  - State electorate: Barwon
  - Federal division: Parkes
- Elevation: 315 m (1,033 ft)

Population
  - Total: 17,456 (UCL 2021)
- Time zone: UTC+9:30 (ACST)
  - Summer (DST): UTC+10:30 (ACDT)
- Postcode: 2880
- County: Yancowinna
- Mean max temp: 24.2 °C (75.6 °F)
- Mean min temp: 11.9 °C (53.4 °F)
- Annual rainfall: 241.8 mm (9.52 in)

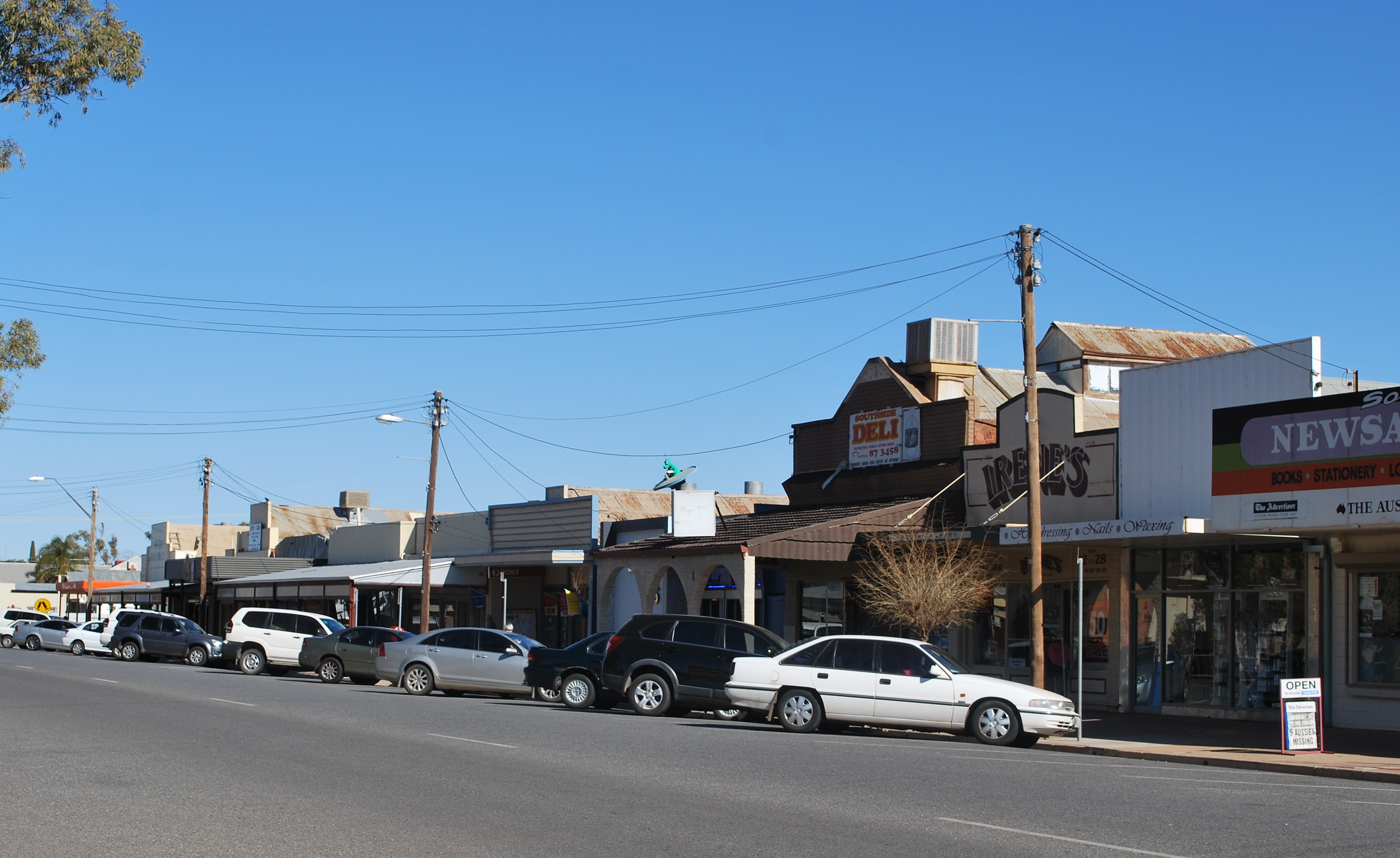
Patton Street, the main commercial district of an area sometimes referred to as 'South Broken Hill'

Broken Hill is a city in the far west region of outback New South Wales, Australia. An inland mining city, it is near the border with South Australia on the crossing of the Barrier Highway (A32) and the Silver City Highway (B79), in the Barrier Range. It is 315 m (1,033 ft) above sea level, with a cold semi-arid climate, and an average rainfall of 265 mm (10.4 in). The closest major city is Mildura, 300 km (190 mi) to the south and the nearest state capital city is Adelaide, the capital of South Australia, which is more than 500 km (310 mi) to the southwest and linked via route A32, the Barrier Highway.

The town lies on the traditional lands of the Wilyakali people. It became prominent in Australia's mining, industrial relations, and economic history after the discovery of silver-lead-zinc ore in the Broken Hill ore deposit, in an ore body known as the Line of Lode. This led to the opening of several mines and established Broken Hill's recognition as a prosperous mining town well into the 1990s. Despite experiencing a slowing economic situation in the late 1990s and 2000s, Broken Hill itself was listed on the National Heritage List in 2015 and remains Australia's longest-running mining town. The Line of Lode Reserve, comprising a visitor centre and restaurant, is atop a man-made hill in the centre of the city.

Broken Hill, historically considered one of Australia's boomtowns, has been referred to as "The Silver City", and less commonly as the "Oasis of the West", and the "Capital of the Outback". Although over 1,100 km (680 mi) west of Sydney and surrounded by desert, the town has prominent park and garden displays and offers a number of attractions, such as the Living Desert Sculptures. The town has a high potential for solar power, given its extensive daylight hours of sunshine.

== Time zone ==
Unlike the rest of New South Wales, Broken Hill (and the surrounding region) observes Australian Central Standard Time (UTC+9:30) and Australian Central Daylight Time (UTC+10:30) , the same time zone used in nearby South Australia. This is because at the time the Australian dominions adopted standard time, Broken Hill's only direct rail link was with Adelaide, not Sydney. Similarly, Broken Hill is regarded as part of South Australia for the purposes of postal parcel rates and telephone charges. Broken Hill also used to be a break-of-gauge station where the state railway systems of South Australia and New South Wales met.

== Town name ==
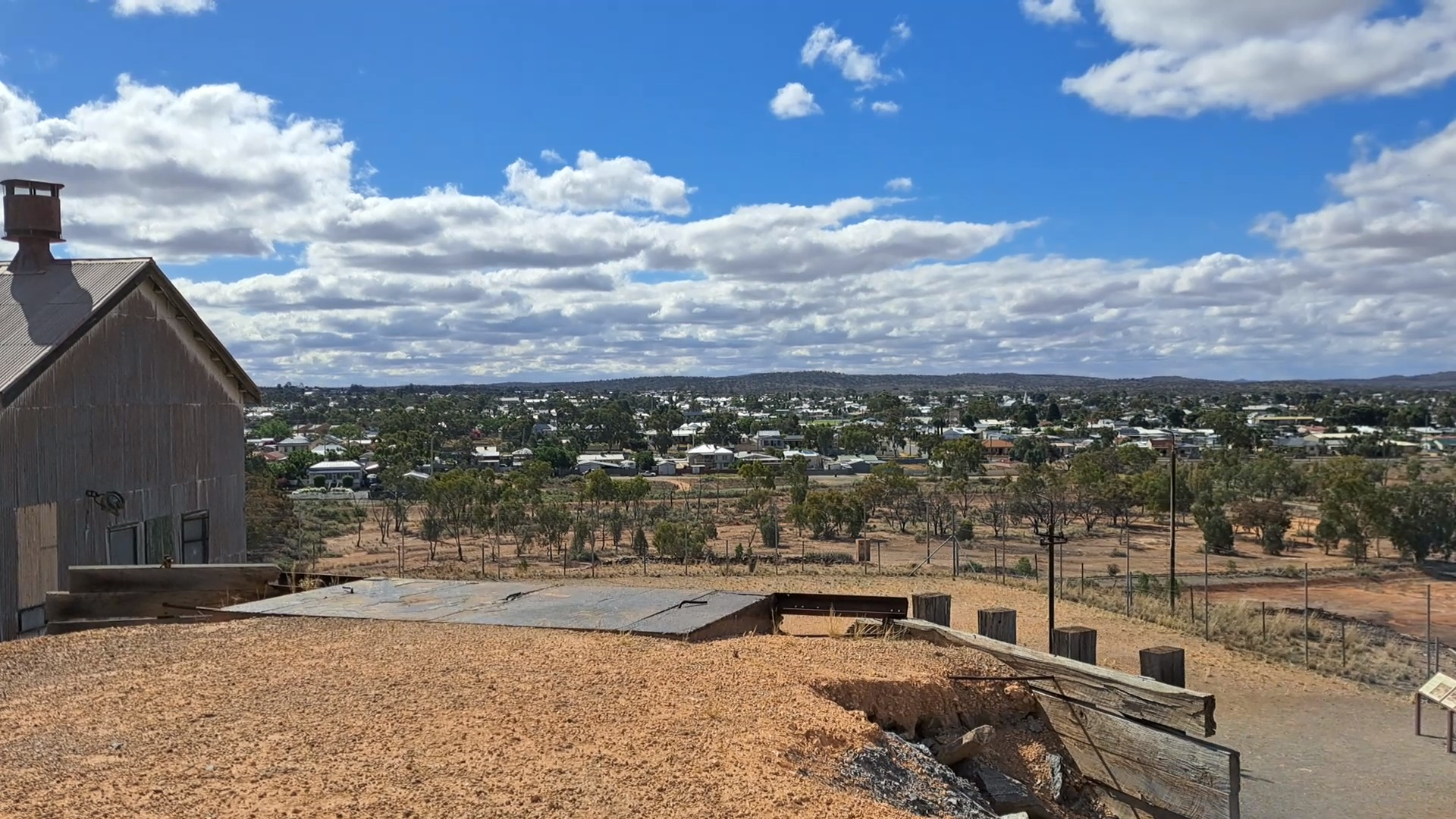
A view of Broken Hill from Brown's Shaft, at Junction Mine

Broken Hill is Australia's longest-lived mining city. In 1844, the explorer Charles Sturt saw and named the Barrier Range, and at the time referred to a "Broken Hill" in his diary. Silver ore was later discovered on this broken hill in 1883 by boundary rider Charles Rasp. The broken hill that gave its name to Broken Hill actually consisted of a number of hills that appeared to have a break in them. This broken hill no longer exists, having been mined away.

The area was originally known as Willyama.

== Geology ==
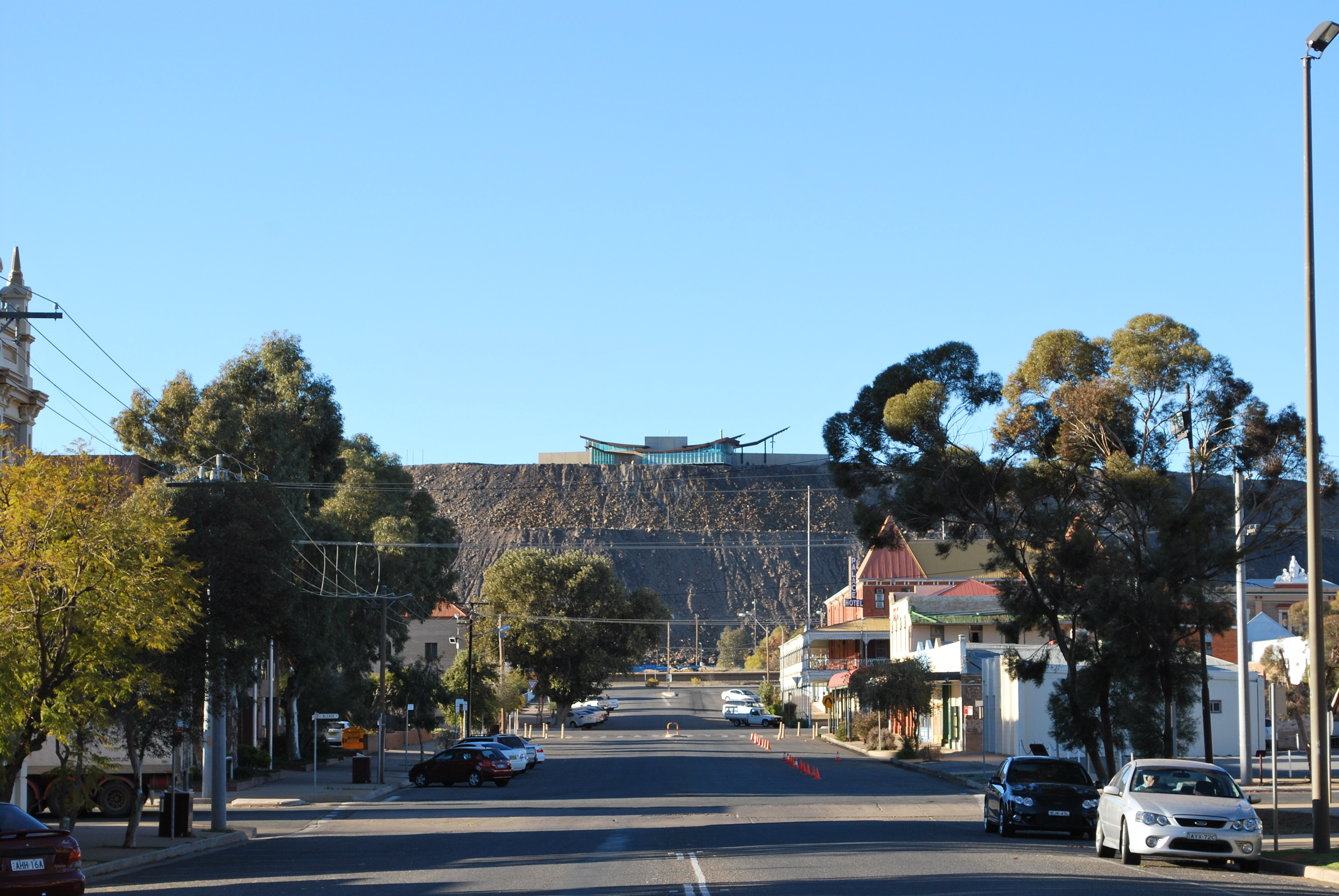
Looking down Sulphide St to the rail line and man-made mullock heaps in the background. The Broken Earth visitor centre is in the background.

Broken Hill's massive orebody, which formed about 1,800 million years ago, has proved to be among the world's largest silver–lead–zinc mineral deposits. The orebody is shaped like a boomerang plunging into the earth at its ends and outcropping in the centre. The protruding tip of the orebody stood out as a jagged rocky ridge amongst undulating plain country on either side. This was known as the Broken Hill by early pastoralists. Miners called the ore body the Line of Lode. A unique mineral recently identified from Broken Hill has been named Nyholmite after Ron Nyholm (1917–1971). Lead with the isotope signature of the Broken Hill deposits has been found across the entire continent of Antarctica in ice cores dating back to the late nineteenth century.

== History ==
=== Pre-European colonisation ===
The earliest human settlers in the area around Broken Hill are thought to have been the Wilyakali, a group of Aboriginal Australian people, once thought to have lived only intermittently in the area because of the lack of permanent water sources.

=== 19th century ===
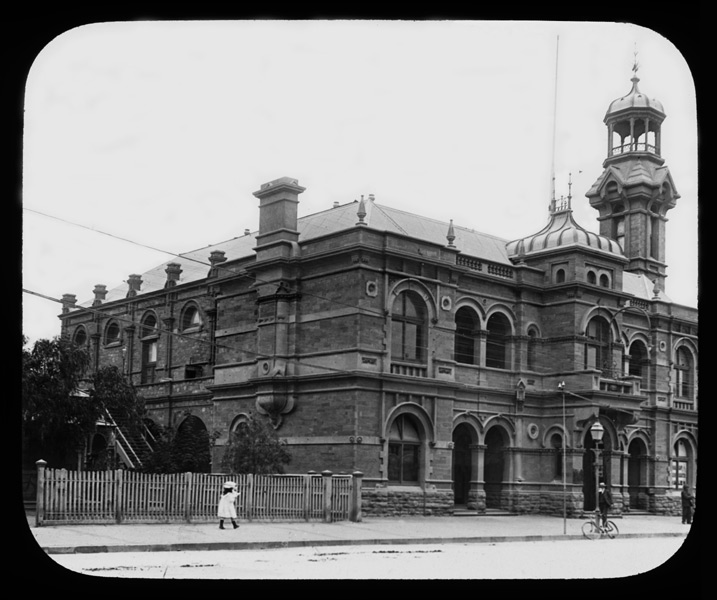
The Broken Hill Town Hall, completed in 1890, was the council seat until 1968.

The first British people to enter the area were the 1844 expedition led by soldier and explorer Charles Sturt. He was guided there along Stephens Creek by an Indigenous teenager from Menindee called Topar. Sturt saw and named the Barrier Range while searching for an inland sea; so naming it because it blocked his journey north.

Pastoralists first began settling the area in the 1850s, and the main trade route to the area was along the Darling River.

Broken Hill was founded in 1883 by boundary rider Charles Rasp, who patrolled the Mount Gipps fences. In 1883, he discovered what he thought was tin, but the samples proved to be silver and lead. The orebody they came from proved to be the largest and richest of its kind in the world and comparable to contemporary mining in Pulacayo, Bolivia. Rasp and six associates founded the Broken Hill Proprietary Company (BHP), later BHP Billiton, and now BHP again, in 1885 as the Syndicate of Seven. BHP was not the only mining operation at Broken Hill though, and mining continued at the southern and northern ends of the Line of Lode. By the early 20th century, Broken Hill was a centre of mining innovation resulting in a viable froth flotation process.

In 1892 Broken Hill Gaol was built, designed by the Colonial Architect, James Barnet, who also designed the Sydney Museum, among others. Its construction cost £15,000, and was carried out by Dobbee and Son. It opened on 8 November 1892 as a 90-bed facility with five prison wardens and initially holding two female and 19 male prisoners.

=== 20th century ===
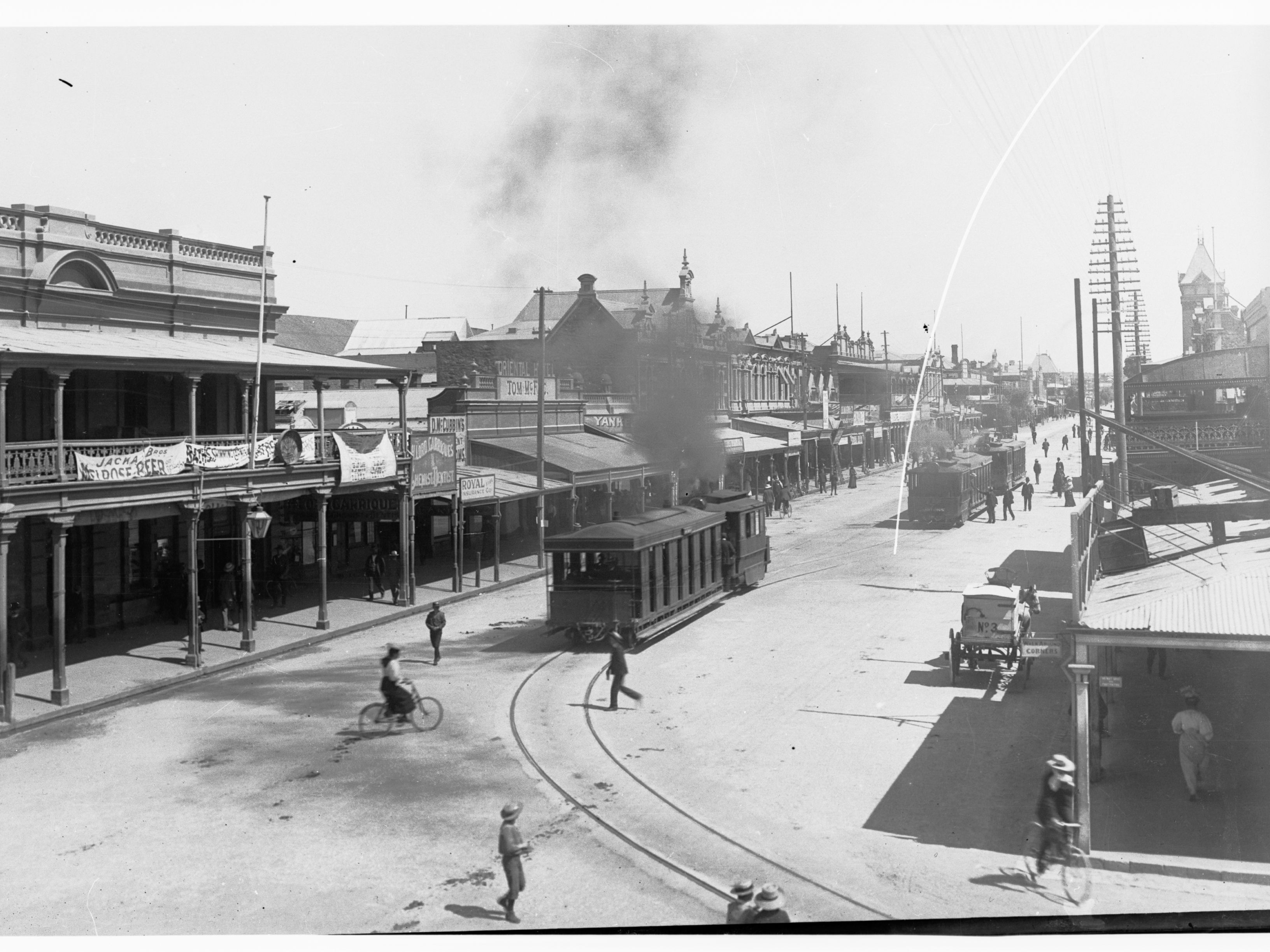
Argent Street in 1907

The Battle of Broken Hill took place on New Year's Day 1915 when two Afghan men, pushing an ice-cream cart, hoisted a Turkish Flag and fired upon a trainload of people who were headed to a New Years Day picnic. Since Australia was at war at the time with the Ottoman Empire, the men were first thought to be Turkish, but were later identified as being from the British colony of India (modern day Pakistan). They killed four and wounded six, before they were killed by a group of policemen and soldiers. The battle witnessed one of the first shots on Australian soil during World War I.

In 1915, BHP had realised that its ore reserves around Broken Hill were limited and began to diversify into steel production. Mining at the BHP mines at Broken Hill would cease on 28 February 1939. The mining interests in Broken Hill at the time caused the town to be linked far more to Adelaide than to Sydney.

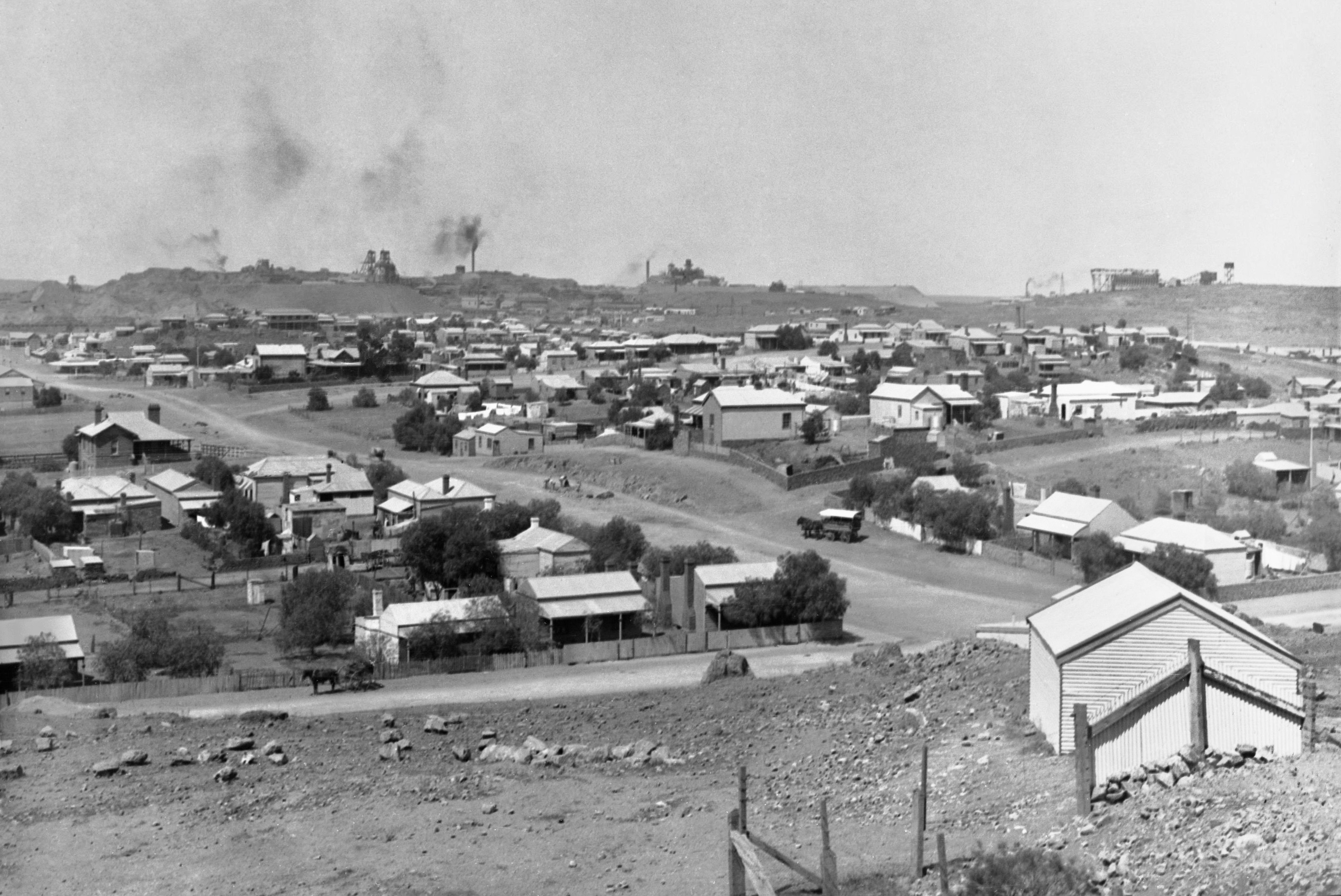
The Township of Broken Hill in the early 1900s

Broken Hill was an early pioneer for organised women's sport in Australia. One of the earliest games of women's Australian rules football was held on 24 August 1918. The game was held between a team representing the 27th Battalion and a team representing the Royal Australian Artillery. Proceeds from the match were donated to the Australian Red Cross. The game was notable in that all players, staff, and officials bar one were women. The Barrier Daily Truth reported on the match in a more matter of fact way than other newspapers at the time reported on women's games, mentioning both the names of the players, and describing several passages of play. The 27th Battalion team, led by sisters Lottie and Daisy Marshall, won the game 2.13 (25) to 2.6 (18). This game was held two weeks before the first organised game of women's football in the heartland of Australian rules, Victoria. Before this game, there had also been organised games of women's cricket and field hockey held in Broken Hill.

In 1918, the Italian Ambassador to Australia, Emilio Eles, with the help of the Australian police and the army, organised the roundup of Italian deserters working there as miners, to be forcibly sent back to Italy to fight in the war.

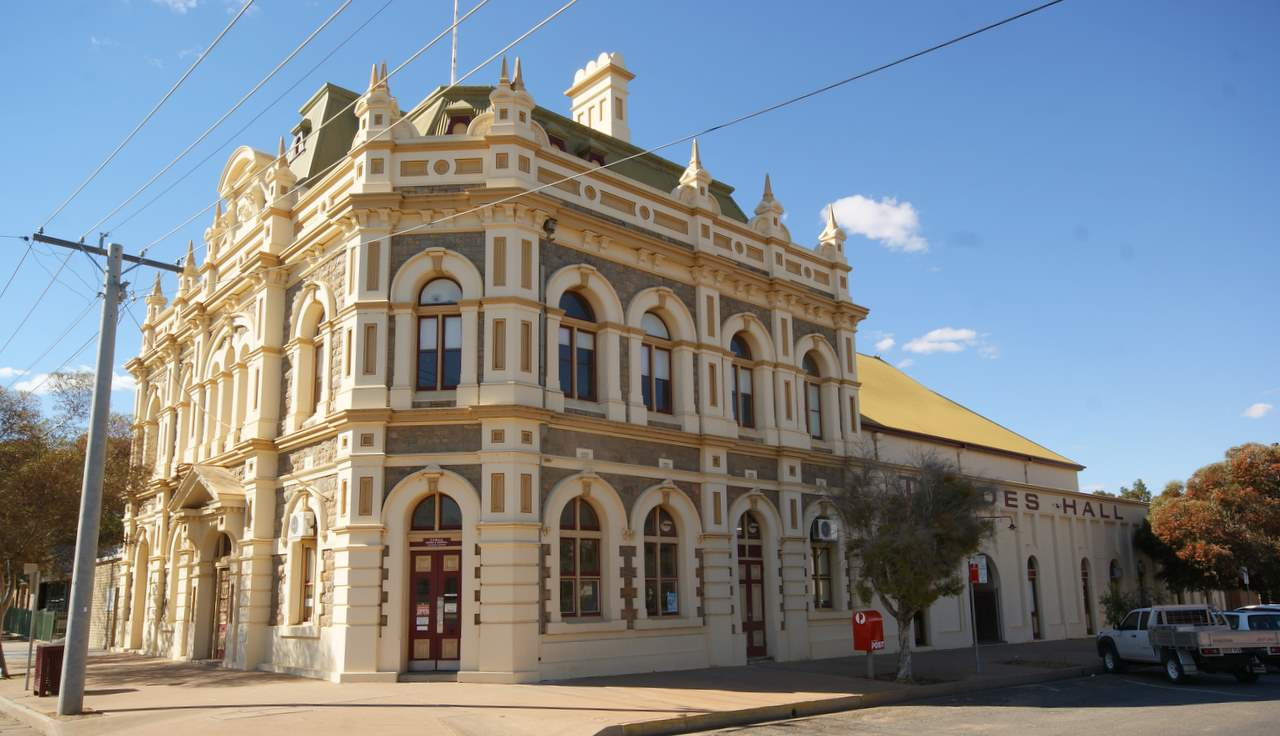
The Broken Hill Trades Hall was commissioned and built by trade unions of the late 19th century

Broken Hill is also known for its input into the formation of the labour movement in Australia, and has a rich trade union history. Some of the most bitter industrial disputes have been fought in Broken Hill in 1892, 1909, and 1919. The last of these led to the formation in 1923 of the Barrier Industrial Council, a group of 18 trade unions, which became one of the most influential organisations in the politics of the city. Like many "outback" towns, Broken Hill was built on precious metals, having once had the world's richest deposits of lead, zinc and silver. Although now depleted somewhat, mining still yields around two million tonnes annually. Some mine tours are available. Sheep farming is now one of the principal industries in the area and there are considerably more sheep than people – almost 2 million Merino sheep.

=== 21st century ===
On 10 January 2007, the Broken Hill City Council was dismissed by the NSW Minister for Local Government following a public inquiry.

As of 2016 the southern and northern mining operations are run by Perilya Limited, who plan to open further mines along the Line of Lode.

On 16 March 2022 parts of the town received record rainfall totals (records began in 1884) when a total exceeding 140 mm (5.5 in) fell in a 24-hour period. The floods that followed this resulted in the death of one man; the main street resembled a river.

== Heritage listings ==
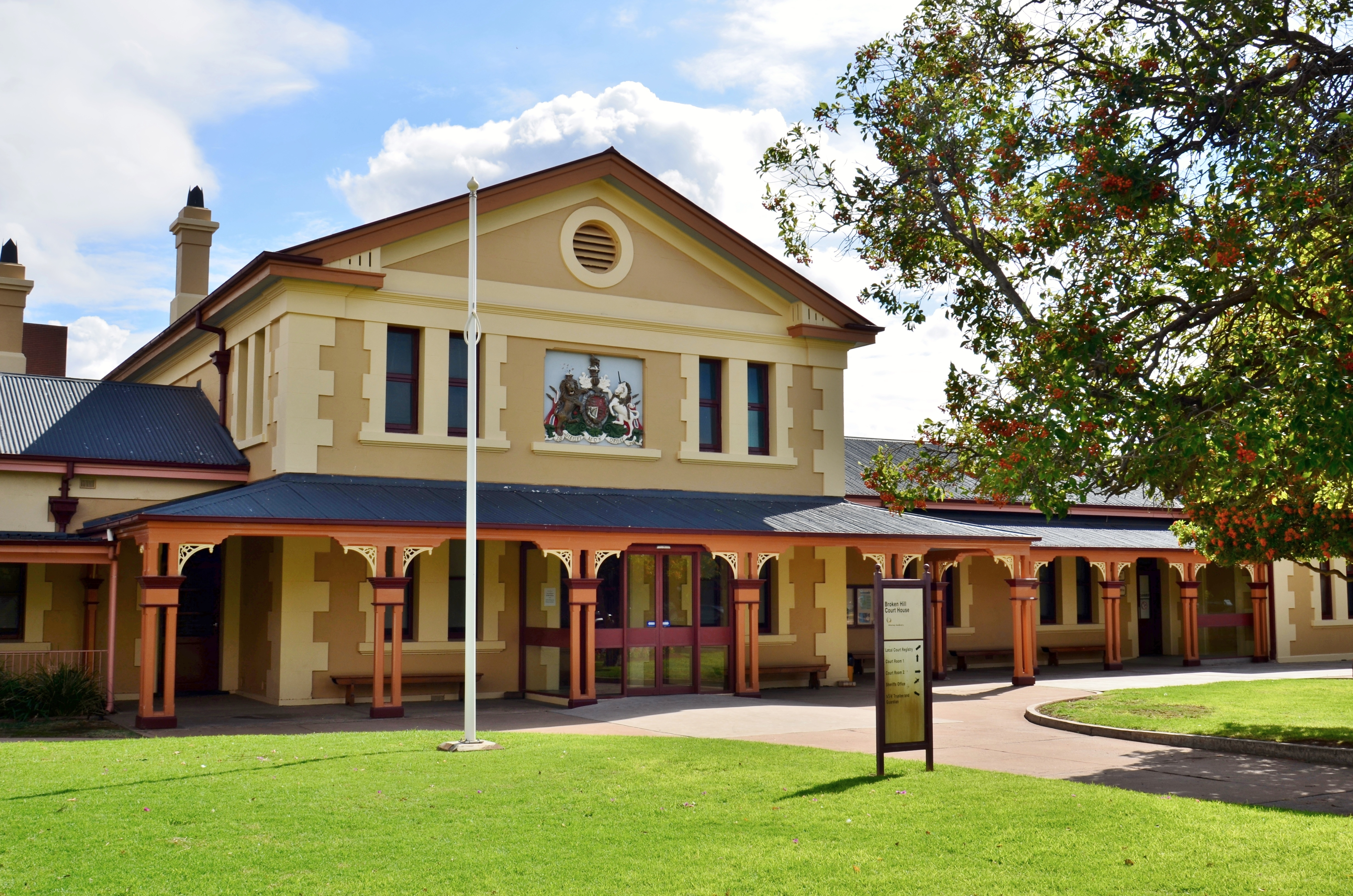
Broken Hill Court House

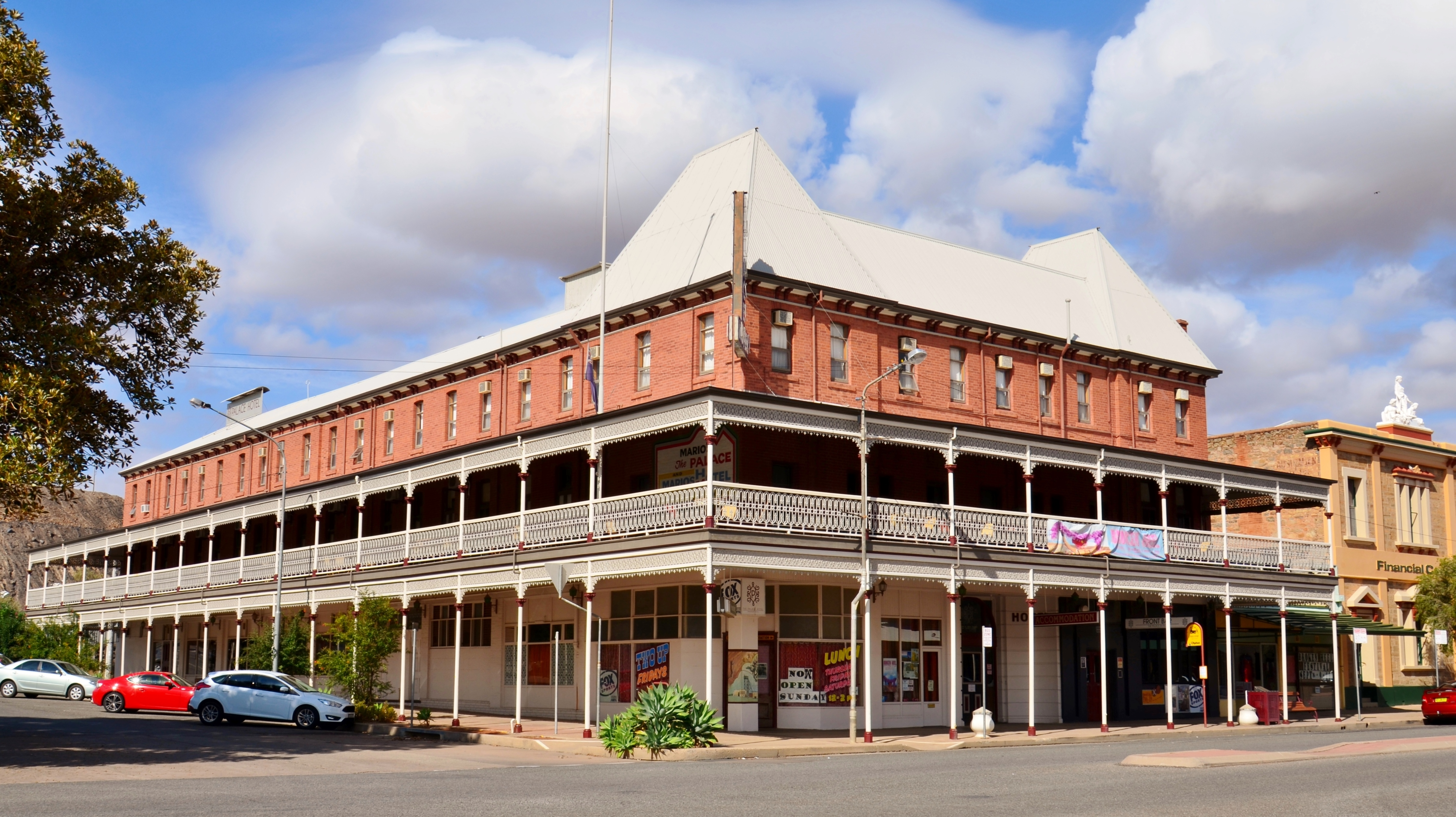
Palace Hotel

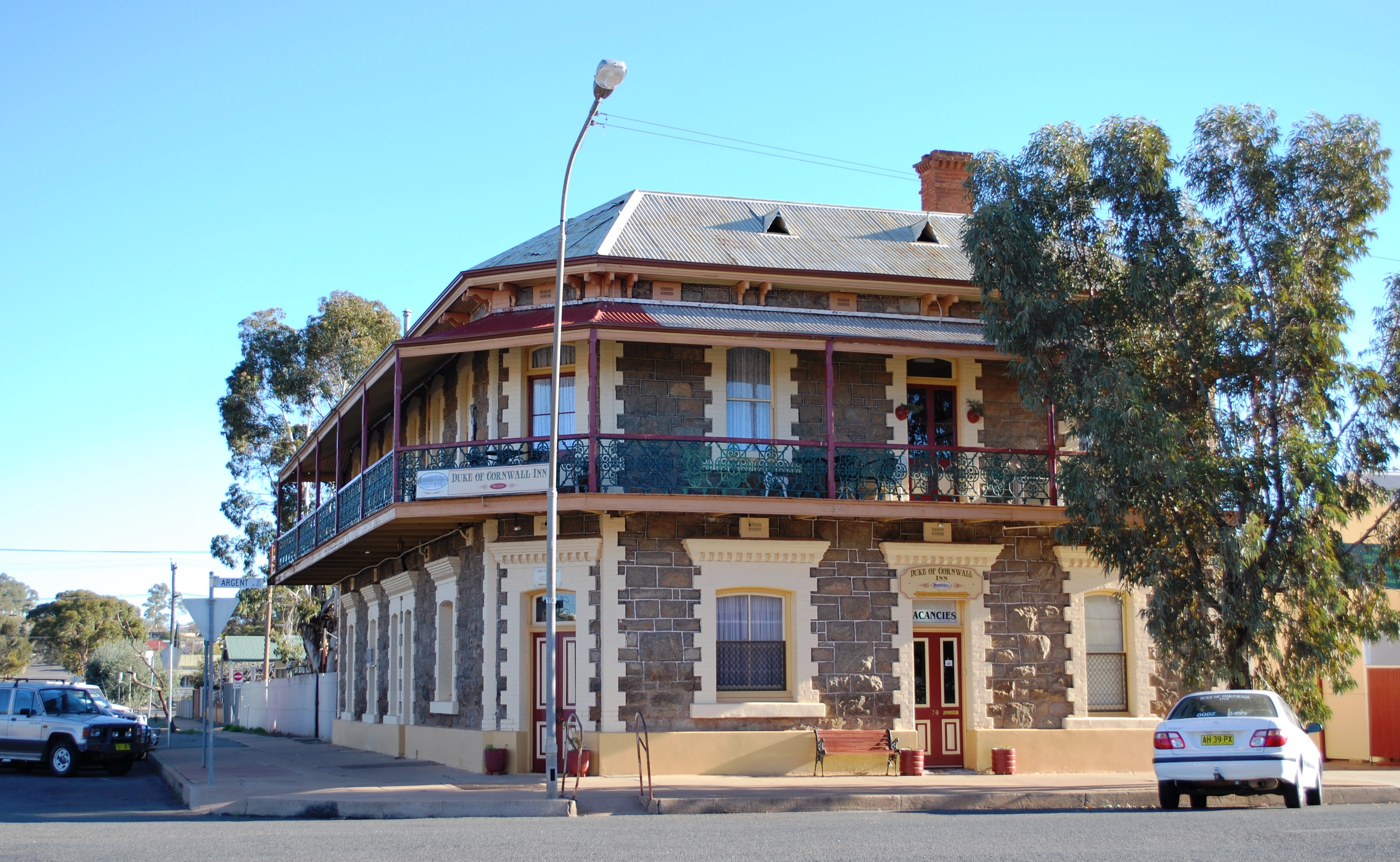
Duke of Cornwall Inn

Broken Hill has a number of heritage-listed sites, including:

- 227 Argent Street: Palace Hotel
- 258–260 Argent Street: Broken Hill Post Office
- 404–408 Argent Street: Walter Sully Emporium
- Broken Hill railway: Broken Hill railway station
- Buck Street: Broken Hill Mosque
- Cobalt Street: Wesley Uniting Church
- 160 Crystal Street: Seppelts Warehouse
- East of corner of Gaffney and Oxide Streets, Proprietary Square: First BHP Offices Chimney Ruin
- Hynes Street: 1915 Picnic Train Attack and White Rocks Reserve.
- 232 Lane Street: "The Old Convent" St Joseph's Convent
- 34 Sulphide Street: Broken Hill Trades Hall
- 165 Wolfram Street: Broken Hill Synagogue
- Unnamed road, 20 km (12 mi) out: Day Dream Smelter
- Piper Street: Central Mine Manager's Residence

=== Town listings ===
The town was listed in 2001 as a National Engineering Landmark by Engineers Australia as part of its Engineering Heritage Recognition Program.

In 2015, Broken Hill became the first city in Australia to be included on the National Heritage List.

== Governance ==
Broken Hill lies in the state electoral district of Barwon and the federal government Division of Parkes

== Infrastructure ==
=== Electric power ===
By the 1920s, most of the nine mines on the Line of Lode had their own steam-powered electrical generators to power the surface and underground workings. As Broken Hill is in a desert with little water and virtually no fuel, steam generation was an expensive option. In 1927 a plan for a central power-generating facility was proposed by F.J. Mars, consulting electrical engineer with the Central Mine. The proposed powerhouse would provide electricity and compressed air.The mines agreed and formed Western New South Wales Electric Power Pty Ltd to construct and operate the plant. The Sulzer diesel-powered plant was completed in 1931. This was one of the earliest instances of the use of diesel power generation in Australia. The plant was enlarged in 1950 to cope with increased demand from the North Mine. At the same time, a new power station run by the Southern Power Corporation (owned by Consolidated Zinc) was erected near the New Broken Hill Consolidated Mine to provide power to the southern end of the Line of Lode. Both stations were connected to a common grid that serviced the mines on the Line of Lode.

A high-voltage direct current back-to-back station with a maximum transmission rate of 40 megawatts was built at Broken Hill in 1986, to draw from the national grid. It consisted of two static inverters working with a voltage of 8.33 kV. As of 2022, the line was 220 kV, running 260 km (160 mi) from Buronga, with two 25 MW diesel fuel turbines operate at the substation's 22 kV. After this line was operational, the two other power stations closed and the equipment was gradually removed from the Central Power Station. The mothballed Southern Power Station, now owned by remnant miner Perilya, still houses five, 9 cylinder, Nordberg marine engines and two Mirrlees V16 marine engines.

In 2010, the Central Power Station buildings were handed back to Broken Hill City Council for a proposed re-development as a film studio, due to the perceived need for a facility in Broken Hill by some local people in preparation for the production of Mad Max: Fury Road. The historic machinery was removed and the giant pits in which the motors were housed were filled with concrete to convert the buildings into a warehouse-type layout. The Broken Hill City Council received considerable funding and spent a large amount of money and resources on establishing a film studio in the buildings, but as of 2014 the buildings remained largely empty and unused as the production of Fury Road had been shifted to Namibia, Africa, following higher than expected rainfall in the Broken Hill region.

In October 2024, Broken Hill and its surrounds suffered a major power outage caused when a storm blew down seven transmission towers. It took 9 days before the local back-up battery was connected, since there were significant technical and regulatory challenges that needed to be fully understood and addressed to make sure the battery did not cause any further issues on the local grid.

=== Solar power ===
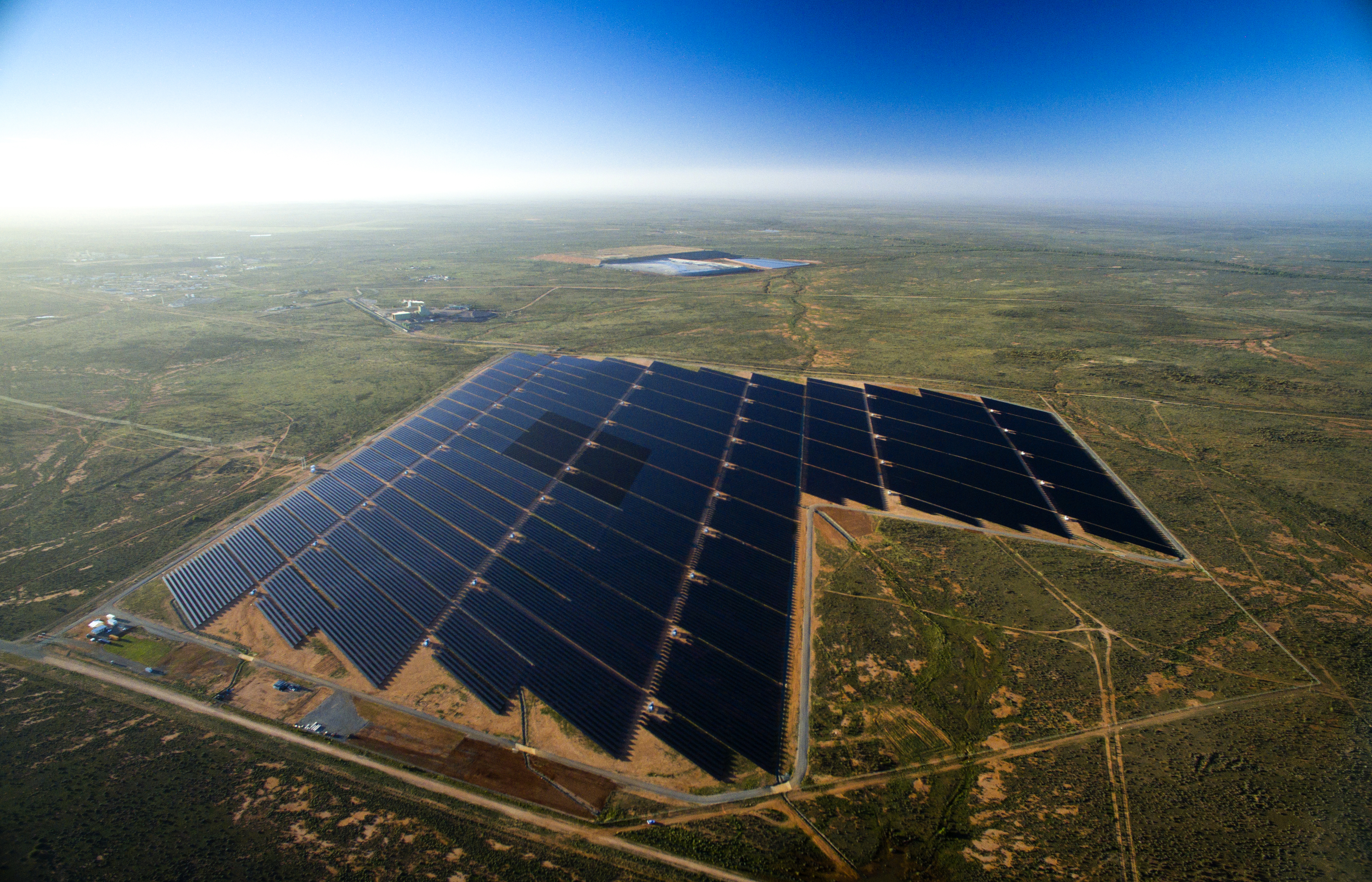
Broken Hill Solar Plant

The high potential for solar power, given the extensive daily hours of sunshine in the town, led to construction of the 53 MW Broken Hill Solar Plant by AGL Energy. It was funded and supported by the Australian Government and New South Wales Government in a bid to encourage the move away from coal generated power in favour of renewable energy. The plant was completed in 2016 and was one of the largest in Australia at the time.

=== Battery and compressed air ===
From 2020, the Silver City Energy Storage 200 MW / 1600 MWh (8-hour) compressed-air energy storage (CAES) facility in the Potosi mine is proposed for Broken Hill to balance local electricity around 2028.

A 50 MW one-hour battery (at the substation and diesel generators) started in August 2024, and has grid-forming capabilities.

=== Water ===
Broken Hill has never had a permanent local water supply that meets the town's needs. By 1888 when the town's population had reached 5,000, the state government built a series of small storage tanks.

By the 1890s, mining development had increased to the point that there was a severe water shortage and the mines and the people fought for water. Emergency water supplies were shipped by rail from the Darling River. In 1891, the Stephens Creek Reservoir was completed by a private company. The cost of water was high but not excessive and people were willing to pay because the environment was arid. Another reservoir was built at Umberumberka, however variable rainfall meant supplemental supplies by rail and rationing was still needed.

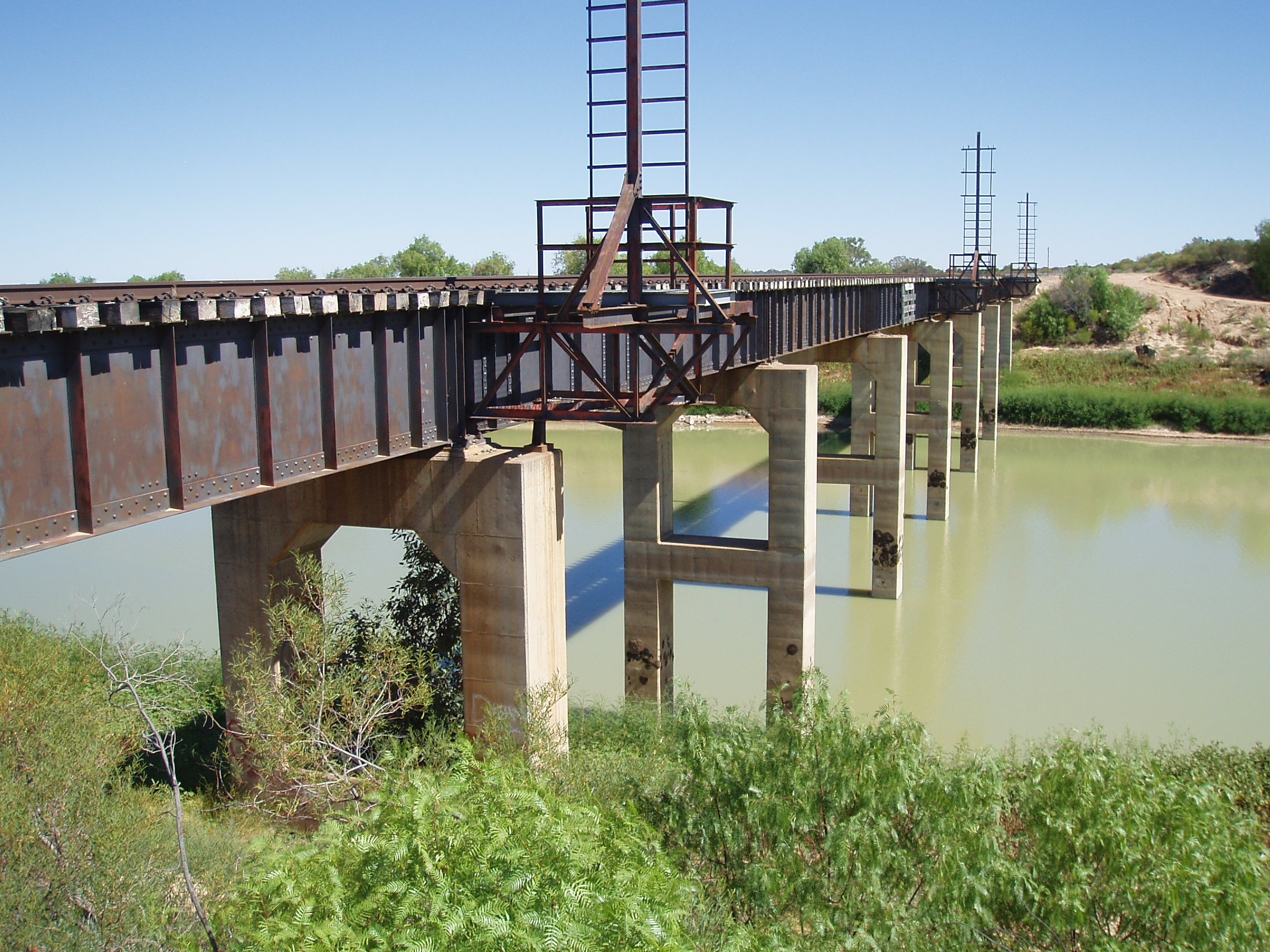
The Broken Hill Line over the Menindee Lakes

In 1952, Broken Hill's demands for a permanent water supply were met with the completion of a 61 cm (24 in) pipeline from Menindee. The pipeline could supply 1.6 megalitres (57,000 ft^{3}; 420,000 US gal) of water per hour. Water storage facilities that are part of the Menindee Lakes Scheme on the Darling River secured the water supply to Broken Hill, making it a relative oasis amid the harsh climate of the Australian outback. High evaporation rates have resulted in the policy of using the local storage for supply before using the pipeline.

In 2004, due to severe drought across much of the Murray Darling Basin Catchment area, the Darling River ceased to flow and the Menindee Lakes dried out. Broken Hill essentially ran out of water, with a muddy sludge coming out of some taps around Christmas time in 2004. The high salt content of the water led to a lot of damage to evaporative air conditioners and rusted out hot water systems at an alarming rate.

Due to the over-extraction of water from the tributaries to the Darling River in the early part of the 21st century, the Menindee pipeline became an insecure supply for the city, in its harsh semi-arid climate. In April 2019, a new New South Wales Government-funded pipeline was commissioned. The pipeline was constructed in a joint venture between John Holland Group, MPC Kinetic Group and TRILITY, running 270 km (170 mi) from Wentworth on the Murray River. There are four pumping stations along the route and a 720-megalitre (25-million-cubic-foot; 190-million-US-gallon) bulk water storage facility 25 kilometres (16 mi) south of Broken Hill. The pipeline can supply up to 37.4 megalitres (1.3 million cubic feet; 9.9 million US gallons) of raw water per day.

== Transport ==
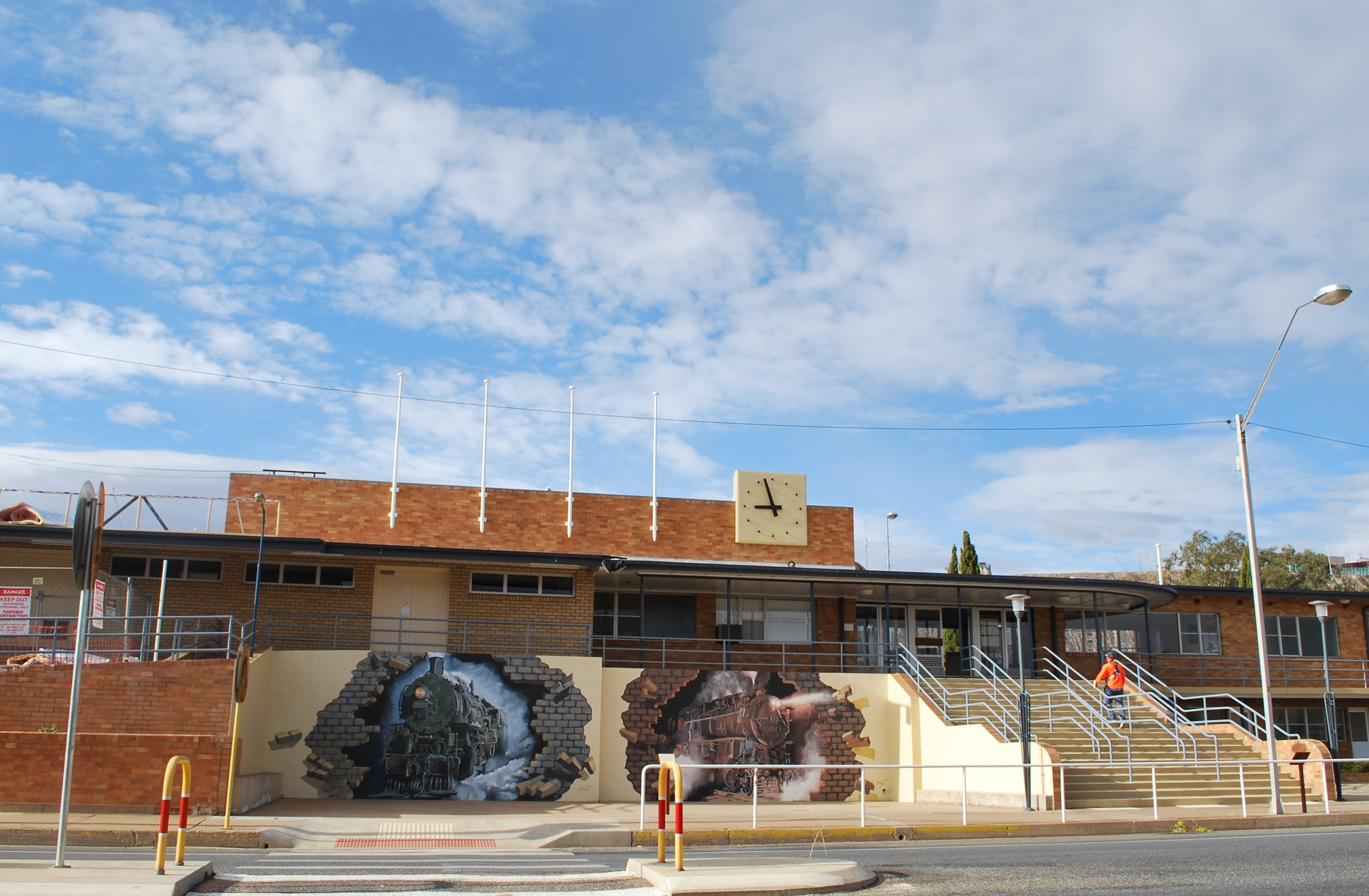
Broken Hill railway station

The city's isolation was a problem until the Adelaide narrow-gauge railway link was finished in 1888. Since the Government of New South Wales would not allow the South Australian Railways to continue its 1067 mm (3 ft 6 in) narrow-gauge railway across the border to the mines, the last 31 kilometres (19 miles) were built and operated by a private company, the Silverton Tramway Company. "Silverton" was incorporated into the name because the railway was originally intended to serve the mining town of Silverton. However, by the time the railway reached Silverton it was already being eclipsed by the newer and bigger mine at Broken Hill. The main purpose of the railway was to transport concentrates and ores from the mines to the smelters and port facilities on the coast at Port Pirie, South Australia. Backloading to Broken Hill transported supplies, principally coal for boilers at the mines and timber for the timber sets used underground in mining. The Silverton Tramway Company was the most profitable railway company on the Australian Securities Exchange.

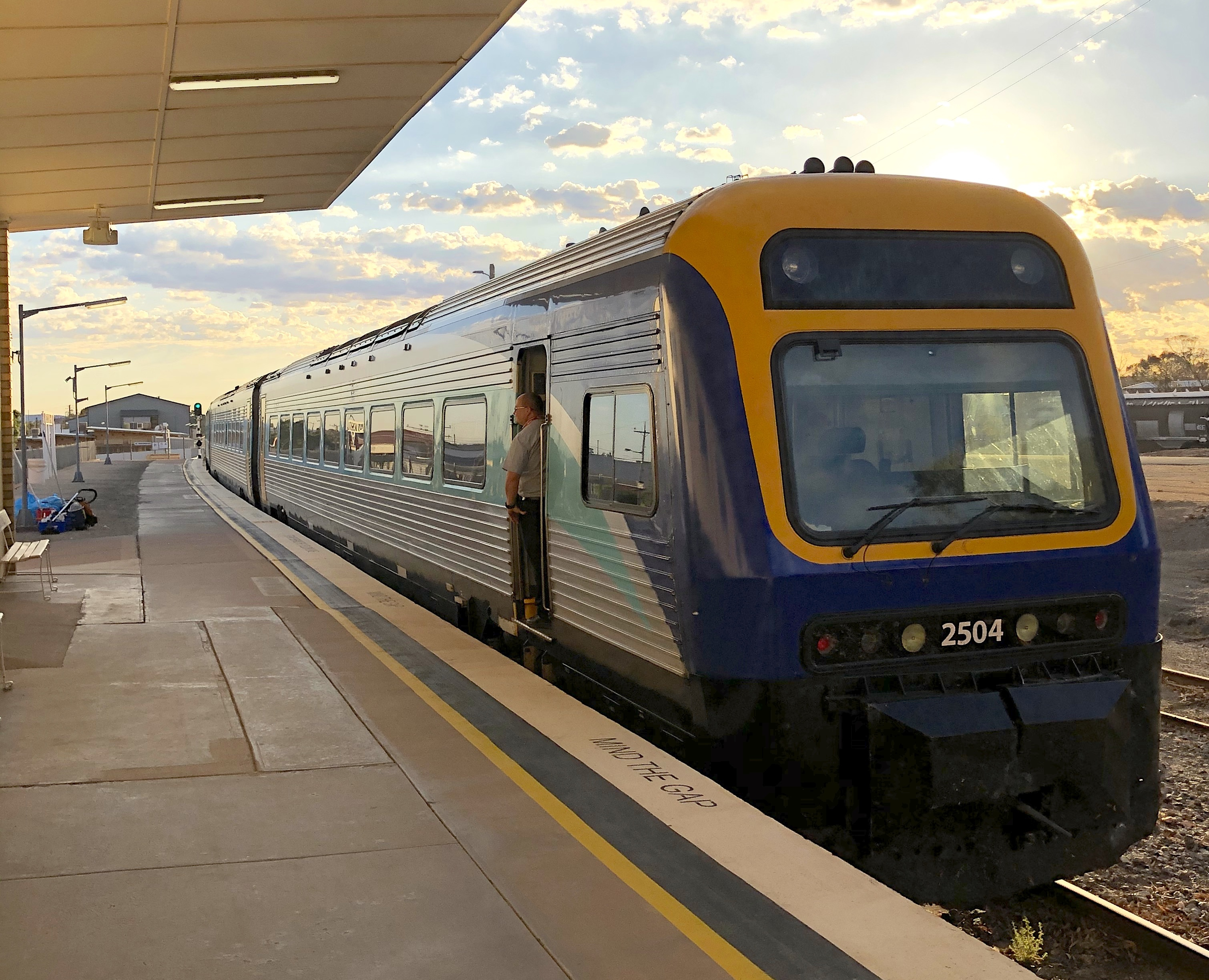
The Outback Xplorer at Broken Hill railway station

The main sidings and locomotive servicing facilities were in Railwaytown, a suburb of Broken Hill, with sidings running to the south and north to serve the mines. The main passenger station was at Sulphide Street.

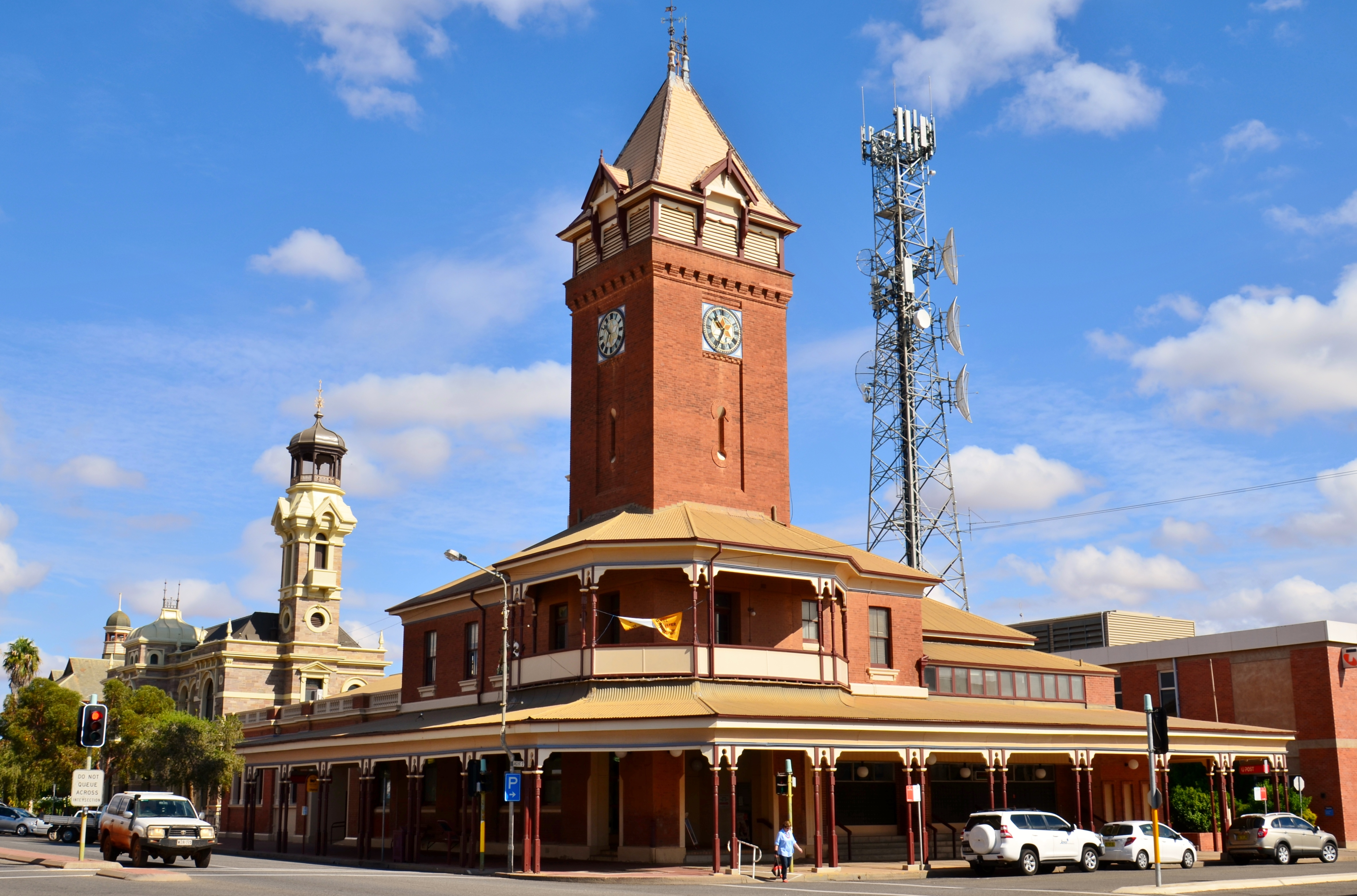
The Broken Hill Post Office; rail lines played a significant role in Broken Hill's postal system

From the later 1890s, Broken Hill Council campaigned for a street tramway to provide public transport around town and to the mines. Eventually the Government of New South Wales decided to build one, which was opened in 1902. It was operated by steam trams transferred from Sydney by sea and then by rail across South Australia. After World War I it sustained increasing losses until the Government of New South Wales closed the system in 1926.

A curiosity was the Tarrawingee Tramway, a 1067 mm (3 ft 6 in) narrow-gauge railway line that ran north from Broken Hill for about 40 miles (64 km) to an area of limestone deposit which was transported to Broken Hill for use in the smelters at the mines. The tramway opened in 1891 but closed in 1898 as the smelters moved to Port Pirie. In 1889 the Public Works Committee of the New South Wales Legislative Assembly recommended that the Government take over the line and it subsequently became a narrow-gauge part of the New South Wales Government Railways (NSWGR) run under contract by the Silverton Tramway Company.

An excursion train on the Silverton Tramway was fired on by two immigrant supporters of the wartime Ottoman Empire in 1915. They shot dead four people and wounded seven more before being killed by police and military officers.

In 1919, a 1,435 mm (4 ft 8 1/2 in) standard gauge rail link from Broken Hill to Menindee was opened, mainly to transport water from the Darling River to Broken Hill. Earlier sections of what became the Broken Hill railway line had been opened as early as 1885, reaching Trida in 1919, but a 257 kilometres (160 miles) gap remained between Trida and Menindee. It was finally closed in 1925, resulting in a continuous route from Sydney to Broken Hill. The terminus for the train was at Crystal Street station, 2 kilometres (1.2 miles) from the Silverton Tramway Company's Sulphide Street station. The rolling stock was transported by sea to South Australia and the railway was supervised by the superintendent of the Broken Hill Government Tramways.

In 1927, the direct link to Sydney was completed. In 1937 the NSWGR placed the Silver City Comet into service – the first air-conditioned train in Australia, which ran between Broken Hill and Parkes.

During World War II land transportation between South Australia and the eastern states became important because of the threat posed by submarines and mines to coastal shipping. Extensive transshipment yards were constructed at Broken Hill in 1942 to allow transshipment of munitions.

With the purchase of the Sulphide Corporation by the Zinc Corporation in 1948, the modern Cockle Creek Smelter was constructed south of Newcastle. This started to take lead and zinc concentrates directly from Broken Hill via rail in the 1960s via the W44 Concentrate Train, marking the first major use of the rail link to the eastern seaboard.

In 1970 the 1,067 mm (3 ft 6 in) gauge railway from Broken Hill to Port Pirie was superseded by a more heavily built 1,435 mm (4 ft 8 1/2 in) gauge line, broadly following the narrow-gauge route but with easier gradients and broader curves. This completed the long-awaited transcontinental rail corridor from Sydney to Perth.

Broken Hill railway station is one of the stops of the Indian Pacific passenger service, operated by Journey Beyond, from Sydney to Perth via Adelaide. The weekly NSW TrainLink Outback Xplorer service was introduced in 1996; it arrives from Sydney on Mondays, departing Broken Hill on Tuesdays for the return to Sydney. NSW TrainLink also operates a daily road coach service connecting at Dubbo with the Central West XPT to Sydney. The return journey arrives daily at 22:45. On 24 June 2019, NSW TrainLink introduced a twice-weekly coach service to Adelaide. NSW TrainLink also operates a coach service to Mildura, on Wednesdays and Fridays.

Rex Airlines operates air services from Broken Hill Airport to and from Adelaide, Dubbo, Griffith, and Sydney. Silver City Scenic Flights provide local scenic flights over the city, longer air safaris to various destinations in outback Australia and also private air charter services from Broken Hill Airport.

Local public transport is provided by CDC Broken Hill, operating four city bus routes from Monday to Saturday. The city is also serviced by two urban taxi companies.

== Climate ==
Broken Hill has a cold semi arid climate (BSk) under the Köppen climate classification. Winters in Broken Hill are relatively cool; summers are mostly hot and dry, with the odd cold front that causes a sharp temperature drop from time to time, on account of its far-western longitude exposing it to cold airmasses off the Great Australian Bight. The average maximum during the summer is about 33 °C (91 °F) with an average of 25% humidity, although storms and cooler weather do occur. Broken Hill averages 157.3 clear days per year. Dust storms are a common problem in the desert, but in the late 1930s the people of Broken Hill, led by Mr Keast of the Zinc Corporation mine, created green reserves to surround the town, thus protecting it from the worst of the storms. Dew points in the summer average between 4.6 and 7.8 °C (40.3 and 46.0 °F).

Climate data for Broken Hill Airport AWS (1957–2023); 281 m AMSL; 32.00° S, 141.47° E
Month	Jan	Feb	Mar	Apr	May	Jun	Jul	Aug	Sep	Oct	Nov	Dec	Year
Record high °C (°F)	47.8 (118.0)	45.5 (113.9)	41.3 (106.3)	36.8 (98.2)	29.9 (85.8)	28.0 (82.4)	26.2 (79.2)	31.0 (87.8)	37.0 (98.6)	39.0 (102.2)	44.7 (112.5)	45.6 (114.1)	47.8 (118.0)
Mean daily maximum °C (°F)	33.8 (92.8)	32.5 (90.5)	29.1 (84.4)	24.4 (75.9)	19.3 (66.7)	16.0 (60.8)	15.6 (60.1)	17.8 (64.0)	21.8 (71.2)	25.5 (77.9)	28.8 (83.8)	31.7 (89.1)	24.7 (76.4)
Mean daily minimum °C (°F)	19.4 (66.9)	18.5 (65.3)	15.4 (59.7)	11.4 (52.5)	7.7 (45.9)	5.7 (42.3)	4.9 (40.8)	5.6 (42.1)	8.4 (47.1)	11.6 (52.9)	14.8 (58.6)	17.4 (63.3)	11.7 (53.1)
Record low °C (°F)	8.0 (46.4)	6.7 (44.1)	5.7 (42.3)	3.1 (37.6)	−0.6 (30.9)	−2.5 (27.5)	−2.9 (26.8)	−1.6 (29.1)	−0.9 (30.4)	1.0 (33.8)	4.7 (40.5)	5.9 (42.6)	−2.9 (26.8)
Average precipitation mm (inches)	27.7 (1.09)	28.7 (1.13)	21.3 (0.84)	20.1 (0.79)	29.3 (1.15)	15.4 (0.61)	26.7 (1.05)	18.2 (0.72)	21.6 (0.85)	25.6 (1.01)	29.8 (1.17)	21.0 (0.83)	249.1 (9.81)
Average precipitation days (≥ 0.2 mm)	3.5	2.7	3.2	3.3	4.8	5.1	5.5	5.0	4.6	4.6	4.4	3.5	50.2
Average afternoon relative humidity (%)	25	28	28	32	43	49	48	38	34	28	26	25	34
Average dew point °C (°F)	6.7 (44.1)	7.8 (46.0)	6.3 (43.3)	4.7 (40.5)	4.9 (40.8)	4.3 (39.7)	2.9 (37.2)	1.6 (34.9)	2.1 (35.8)	1.9 (35.4)	3.6 (38.5)	4.6 (40.3)	4.3 (39.7)
Source 1: Australian Bureau of Meteorology (1957–2023)
Source 2: Australian Broadcasting Corporation

== Demographics ==
Historical population
Year	Pop.	±%
1921	26,337	—
1933	26,925	+2.2%
1947	27,054	+0.5%
1954	31,351	+15.9%
1961	31,267	−0.3%
1966	30,043	−3.9%
1971	29,808	−0.8%
1976	27,647	−7.2%
1981	26,913	−2.7%
1986	24,460	−9.1%
1991	23,263	−4.9%
1996	21,356	−8.2%
2001	19,753	−7.5%
2006	18,854	−4.6%
2011	18,430	−2.2%
2016	17,589	−4.6%
2021	17,588	−0.0%
Source: Australian Bureau of Statistics data.

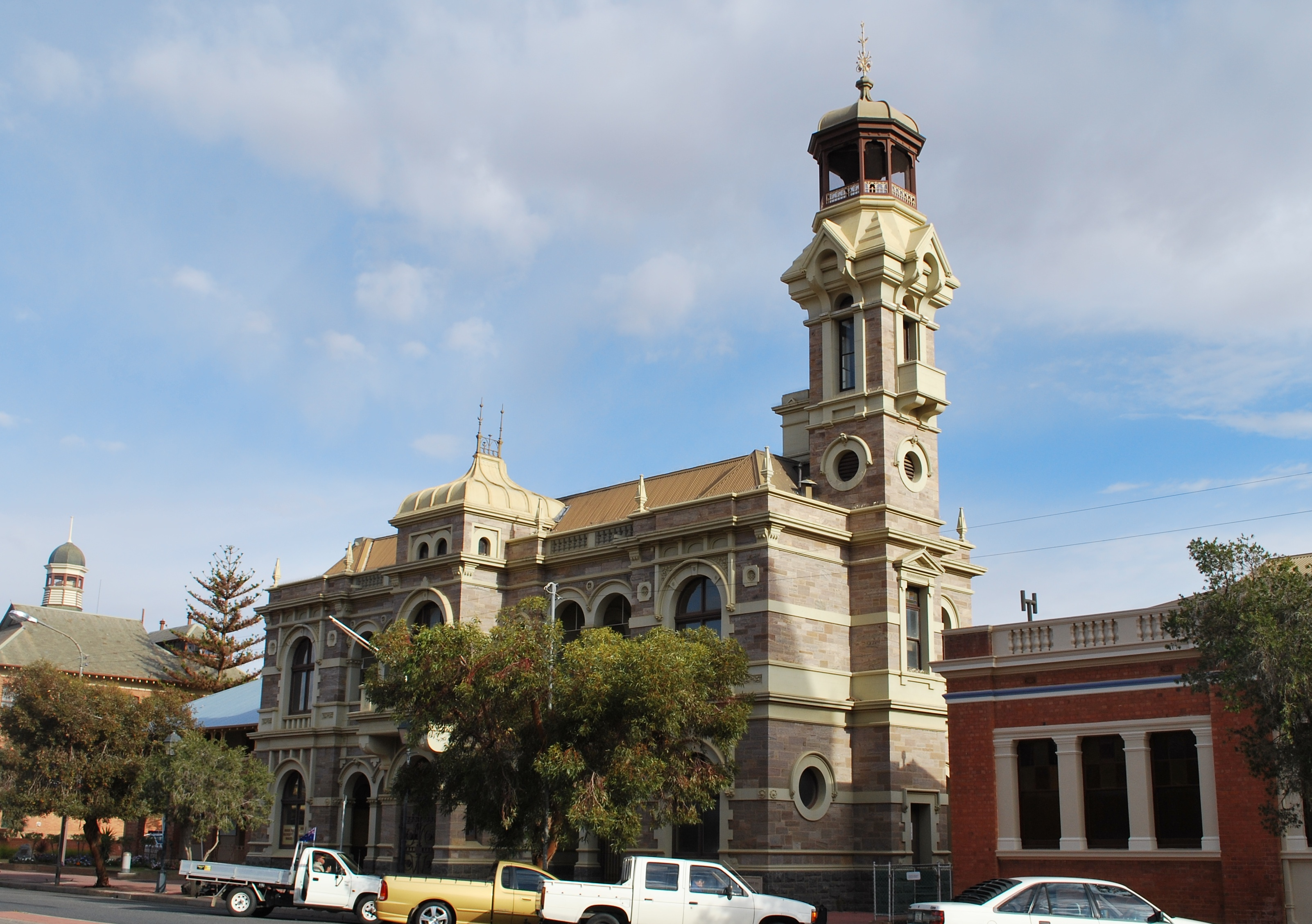
Broken Hill Town Hall

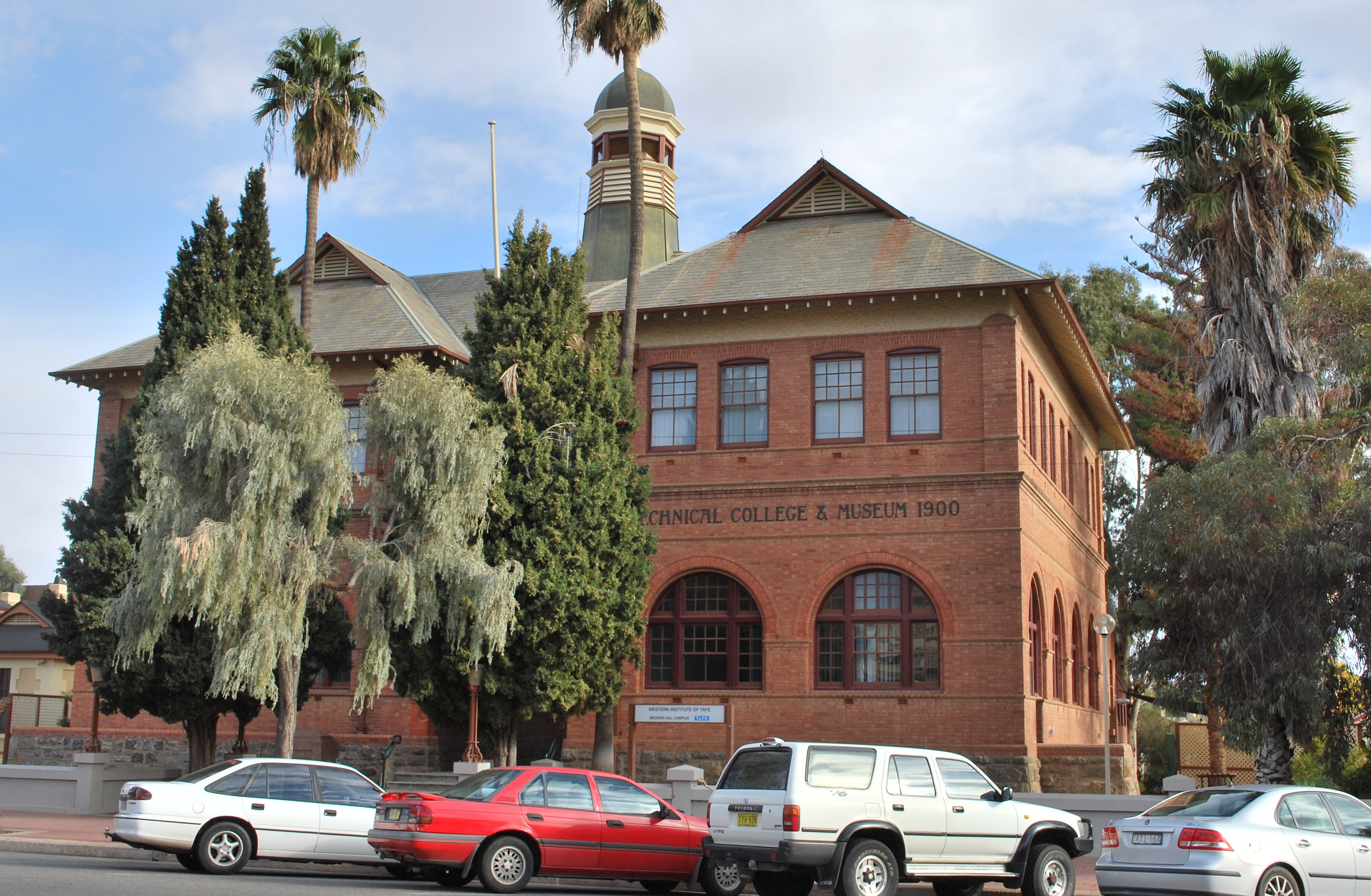
Broken Hill Technical College

In 1933, Broken Hill was the third-largest urban incorporated area in New South Wales, having a population of 26,925. Broken Hill's population peaked at around 30,000 in the early 1960s and has shrunk by one third since the heyday of the 1970s zinc boom, with the decrease attributed to migration from the closure and consolidation of mining operations. The estimated urban population of Broken Hill in 2021 was 17,588. The impact on Broken Hill's economy of the shrinking mining industry and the more efficient mining rates resulted in a higher proportion of part-time employment, higher employment participation rate by females, a general reduction in overall household incomes, and an increase in the average age of the populace as the young leave seeking work.

In 2021, Broken Hill had an unemployment rate of 5.5%, which was higher than the state average of 4.9%.

Broken Hill has always had a small indigenous community. In recent decades, the proportion of the population identifying as Aboriginal has increased markedly; from 0.6% in 1971 to 10.0% in 2021, partly owing to the migration of non-indigenous Australians away from Broken Hill.

In the 19th and early 20th century Broken Hill was home to a community of Afghans. Afghans worked as camel drivers in parts of outback Australia, and they made a significant contribution to economic growth when transport options were limited. The camel drivers formed the first sizeable Muslim communities in Australia, and in Broken Hill they left their mark in the form of the first mosque in New South Wales (1880).

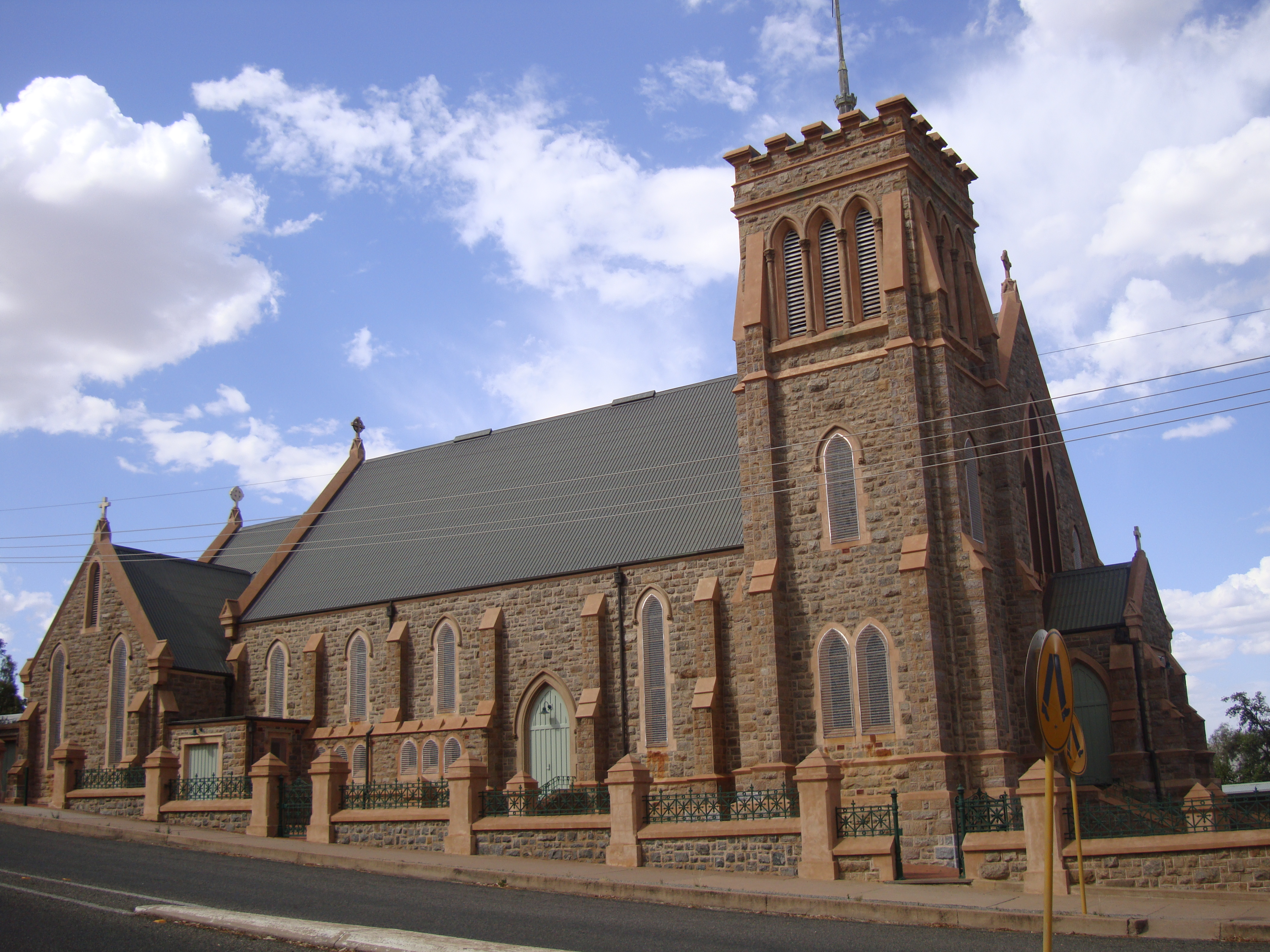
Sacred Heart Cathedral

In 2021, Broken Hill had a population of 17,588. The median age is 44 and 10.0% of residents are Aboriginal or Torres Strait Islander.

86.0% of residents are born in Australia; significantly higher than the national average of 66.9%. The most common other countries of birth are Philippines (1.1%), England (0.8%), and New Zealand (0.4%). The most common reported ancestries in Broken Hill are Australian (43.2%), English (37.8%) and Australian Aboriginal (9.2%). 77.8% of residents reported both parents being born in Australia, notably higher than the national average of 45.9%.

The top religious groups in Broken Hill are Catholic (18.0%), Anglican (8.8%) and Uniting Church (6.1%). 48.8% stated no religion and 9.9% did not answer the question.

== Economy ==
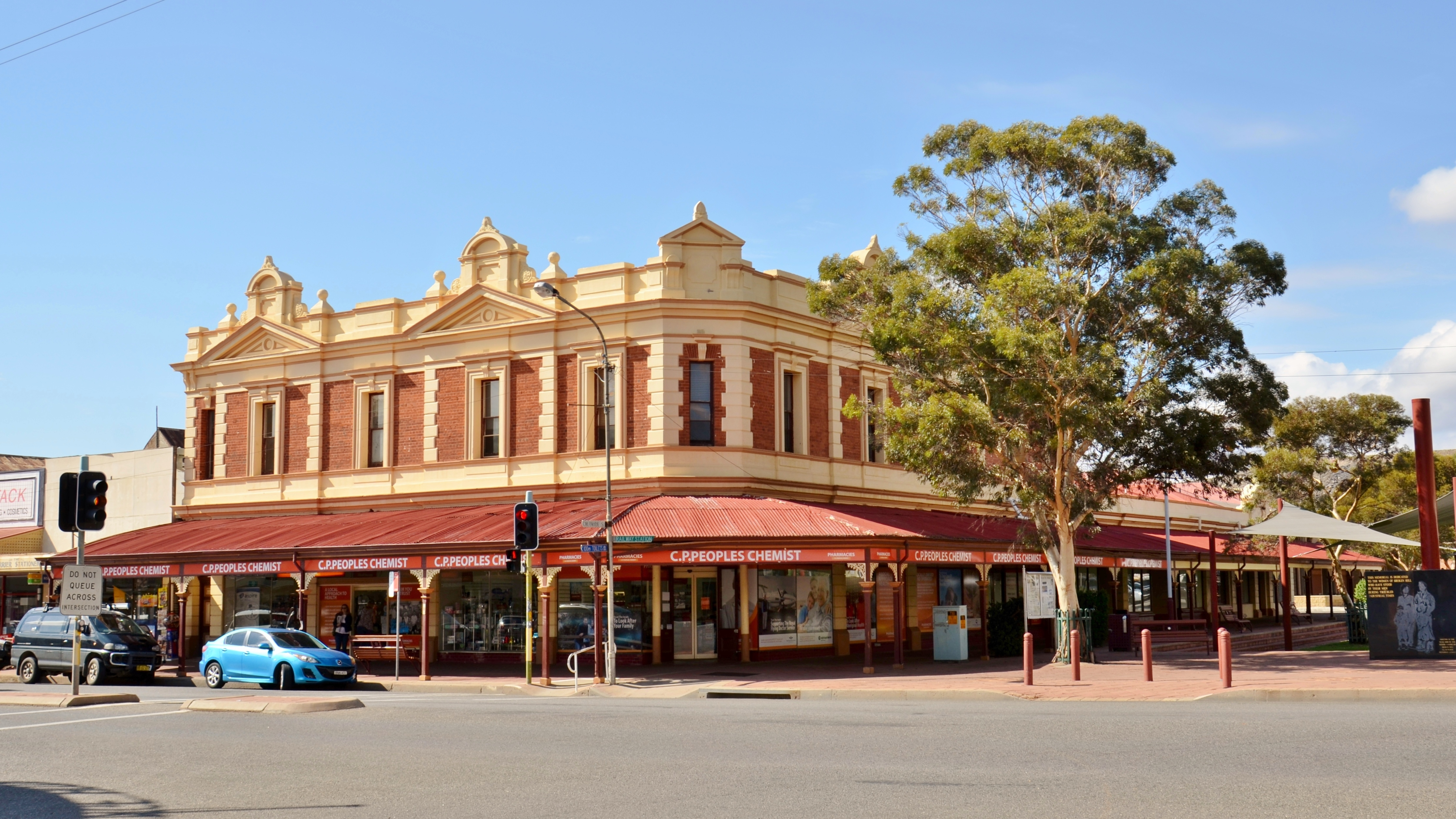
Wendt's Chambers; many 19th century commercial shopfronts still remain

Broken Hill has been and still is a town dominated by the mining industry, which led to considerable town prosperity in the 19th and 20th century. The mines founded on the Broken Hill Ore Deposit – the world's richest lead-zinc ore body – have until recently provided the majority of direct employment and indirect employment in the city. The Broken Hill Proprietary Company became Australia's largest mining company, and later became part of the world's largest mining company, BHP.

Before the 1940s, mining was done by hand tools with high labour usage rates and included horse and mule-drawn carts underground. The advent of diesel powered mining equipment in the late 1940s and the move toward mechanised underground mining has resulted in less labour used per tonne of ore recovered, and the mine workforce has declined.

While the low metal prices of the 1990s led to the failure of miner Pasminco, the recent resurgence in metal prices has returned the sole existing operator, Perilya Limited, to profitability and prompted Consolidated Broken Hill Limited to advance development of the untouched Western Lodes and Centenary Lodes. This created over 70 jobs during development and will lead to a second, new, milling operation built within the town.

Because of its dependence on the mining industry, a shrinking population common to other rural centres, and its geographic isolation, Broken Hill has promoted its arts and cultural heritage and positioned itself as a tourism destination in an effort to reduce its reliance on mining as a source of employment.

Average incomes in Broken Hill are lower than the national average. According to the 2021 census the median weekly household income in the city was $1,167; considerably lower than the national average of $1,746.

== Culture and attractions ==
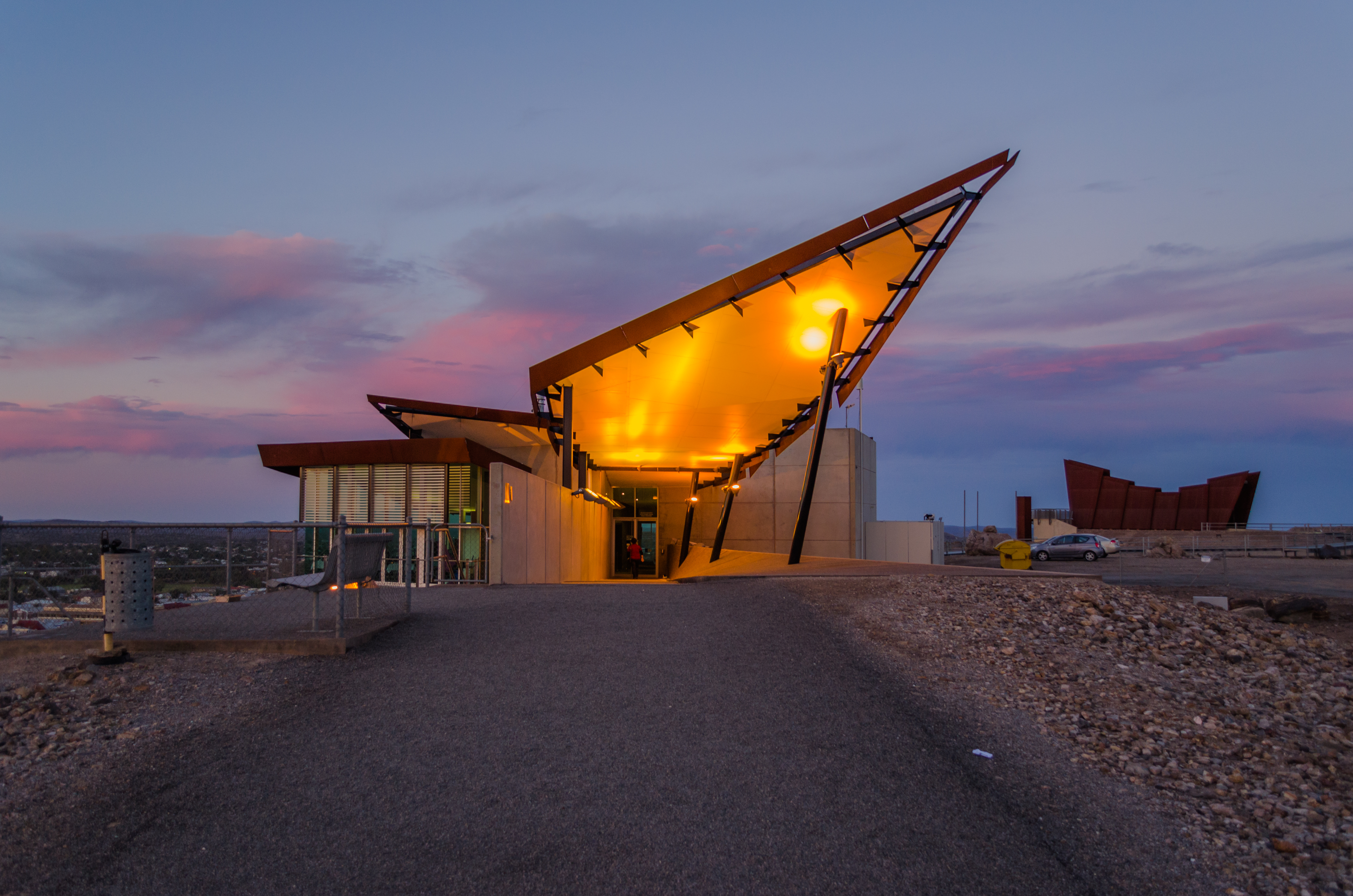
The Broken Earth Restaurant is situated on top of mullock heaps and provides panoramic views of the town

=== Attractions ===
Broken Hill and the surrounding area has many natural and man-made attractions on offer for the tourist, such as the "Living Desert Sculptures".

The Line of Lode Reserve is situated on top of a man-made hill in the centre of the city. Within it are the Miner's Memorial, which lists over 816 miners who had died in Broken Hill mines, along with the Broken Earth Complex, which includes a visitor centre. The reserve was opened in April 2001 as part of the Federation project. A restaurant opened in alongside, operating as Broken Earth Restaurant from 2013, but was forced to close in 2014 owing to lack of patronage. The whole complex lay fallow for some years after 2021, until being revived in 2025, when it was announced that it would reopen with new operators. Also in the reserve is "The Big Bench", a park bench built to a 2.5 times scale.

Other attractions include mining operations (some open to the public), historic buildings, town history walking trails, many resident artists and galleries, the Sculpture Symposium, Cobb & Co coach and wagon rides, Silverton Camel Farm, Stephen's Creek, several quarries, lakes, the Mundi-Mundi plains, and sunsets. The Albert Kersten Mining and Minerals Museum, located on Bromide Street and Crystal Lane, explores the mining history of the town through geology exhibits.

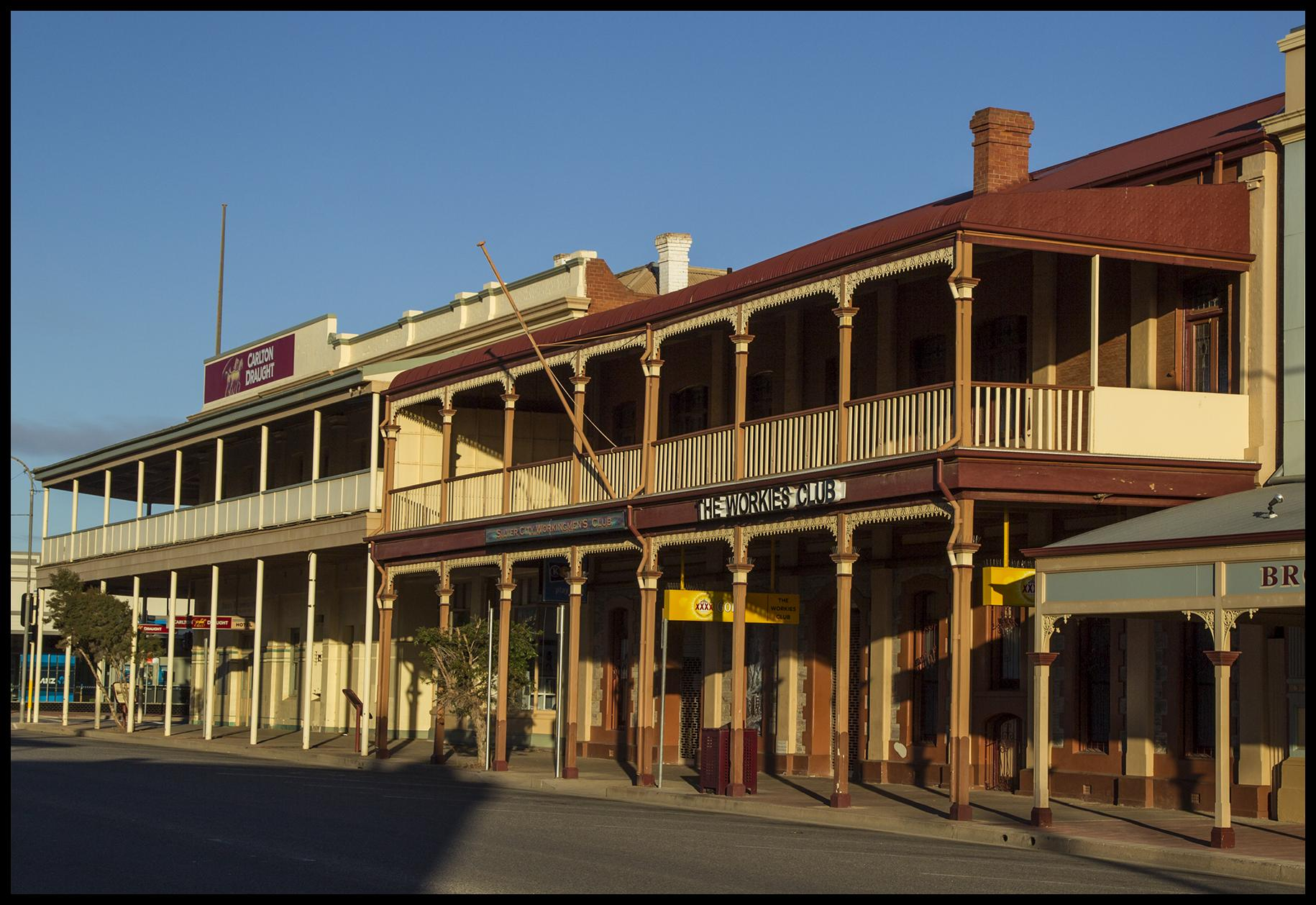
Corrugated-iron balconies and awnings are a characteristic feature of Broken Hill's architecture and streetscape

=== Art ===
The Willyama Art Society (Willyama being an Aboriginal word for "hill with broken contour") was formed in 1961 under the driving influence of Florence May Harding, who was described in 2020 as "the woman who helped make Broken Hill the Art Capital of Outback Australia". The founding members of the society included May Harding (secretary and then treasurer until 1971) and fellow artists Alan Cumpston, Kevin Hart (Pro Hart), Sam Byrne, Susan Dorothea White, Joyce Condon, Hugh Schultz, and John Gregory. John Gregory was the society's president for its first 15 years. The society organised the 2nd Open-air Art Exhibition in Sturt Park, Broken Hill, on 19 November 1961. May Harding wrote a long review of this exhibition, analysing the entries of many of the society's artists. In mid-1962, six members of the society (White, Harding, Cumpston, Hart, Byrne and Gregory) exhibited landscapes in a travelling exhibition The Broken Hill Art Safari, which was arranged by the Airlines of South Australia in conjunction with the Royal South Australian Society of Arts and the Contemporary Arts Society, now known as the Contemporary Art Centre of South Australia. May Harding exhibited her painting Argent Street by Night. The exhibition was opened by Josephine Heysen, granddaughter of Hans Heysen, at the department store of John Martin's in Adelaide on 10 July 1962, before touring to Broken Hill, Whyalla, and Port Lincoln. In 2021, the outbreak of COVID-19 prevented the society from mounting its 60th anniversary exhibition — instead its 61st anniversary was celebrated in an exhibition from 2 to 17 December 2022.

The Brushmen of the Bush was a group of artists who formed in Broken Hill in 1973. Members included Pro Hart and Jack Absalom. The Pro Hart Gallery and Sculpture Park contains a large collection of Hart's paintings and sculptures, as well as many artworks of others that he collected during his lifetime. The gallery also features the Rolls-Royce Silver Shadow that he painted in his unique style.

=== Entertainment ===
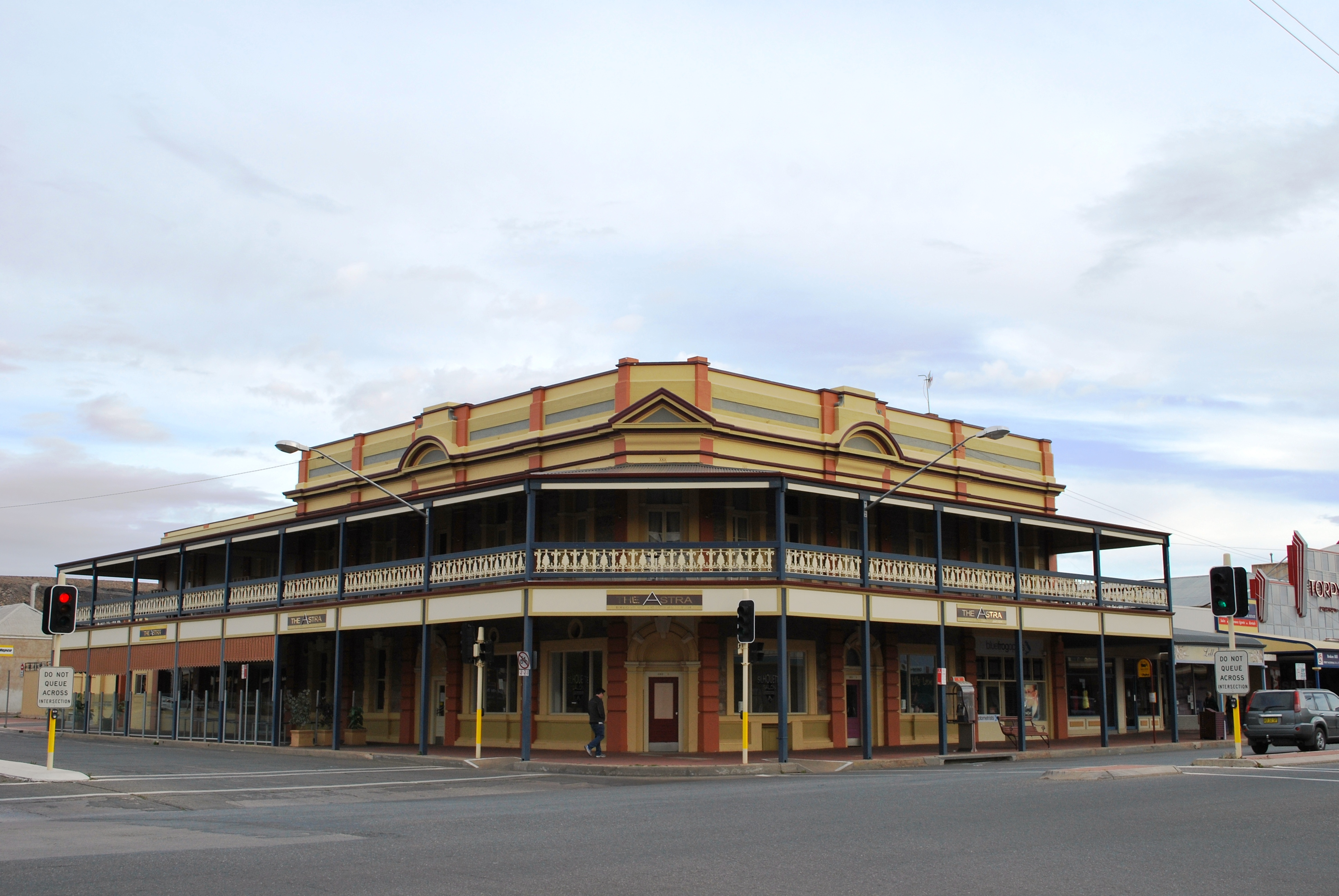
The Astra Hotel

Establishments catering to both locals and tourists include the Musicians Club and the Barrier Social Democratic Club (the Demo Club).

The Silver City Cinema is the last remaining cinema in Broken Hill. The former Century Theatre burned down in 1964, and the new cinema opened in 1967 on the site. It was run John Wren and his family since 1979. The cinema was used by the production team of Mad Max 2: The Road Warrior (1981), who tested their day's footage in the cinema into the early hours of the morning. The Wrens sold the business after the COVID-19 pandemic made it difficult to stay open, and in 2022 the Broken Hill Musicians Club acquired the cinema, and operates as a not-for-profit. The main auditorium is to be renamed the John Wren or Johnny Wren Theatre, and Michael Boland of the Broken Hill Musicians Club hopes to restore the building to the Art Deco style, like the cinema's predecessor, the Century Theatre.

=== Literature ===
Broken Hill has many literary connections. Crime writer Arthur Upfield developed a nostalgic association with the city after his first visit in 1910, and published The Bachelors of Broken Hill, featuring his character Bonaparte, in 1958. Ion L. Idriess wrote the novel The Silver City based on the town.

Kenneth Cook's 1961 novel Wake in Fright—set in the fictional mining town of Bundanyabba—is a thinly disguised portrait of Broken Hill. Cook based the novel on eccentric ocker characters he befriended in Broken Hill, drawing on their penchant for ritualistic drinking, two-up, hunting and alpha-male mateship. The novel was adapted into a 1971 film of the same name, shot on location in Broken Hill and starring Gary Bond, Donald Pleasence and Broken Hill native Chips Rafferty in his final film role.

Writing celebrating the Broken Hill community is featured in "from this Broken Hill" (2010), which "invites the visitor to this site to explore the people, landscapes, culture & history of this iconic city through poetry, prose and photography".

Much of Australian novelist Max Barry's 2013 novel Lexicon was set in Broken Hill.

=== Food ===
Cheese slaw is a common and popular side dish in Broken Hill, and some residents claim the dish originated in the city.

== TV and film production ==
Broken Hill and the surrounding town of Silverton have been used as the base of various film productions.

One of the most well known films to heavily feature Broken Hill is The Adventures of Priscilla, Queen of the Desert where various scenes in town and surrounding outback were filmed. Mario's Palace, now trading as The Palace Hotel, has the "tack-o-rama" mural featured in The Adventures of Priscilla.

Another well-known film to be produced in the surrounds of Broken Hill is Mad Max 2 with principal photography taking place across twelve weeks. Scenes were shot at the Pinnacles as well as the Mundi Mundi Plains. In 2022 filming for Mad Max film Furiosa: A Mad Max Saga took place in Silverton.

Other film and TV productions include:

- Spirits of the Air, Gremlins of the Clouds
- Razorback
- Dirty Deeds
- The Flying Doctors on the Nine Network (1986–1993)
- RFDS: Royal Flying Doctor Service on the Seven Network (2021).

Other films and shows have used Broken Hill for only a few scenes, such as Mission: Impossible II, 800 Words, and Godzilla: Final Wars.

== Health ==
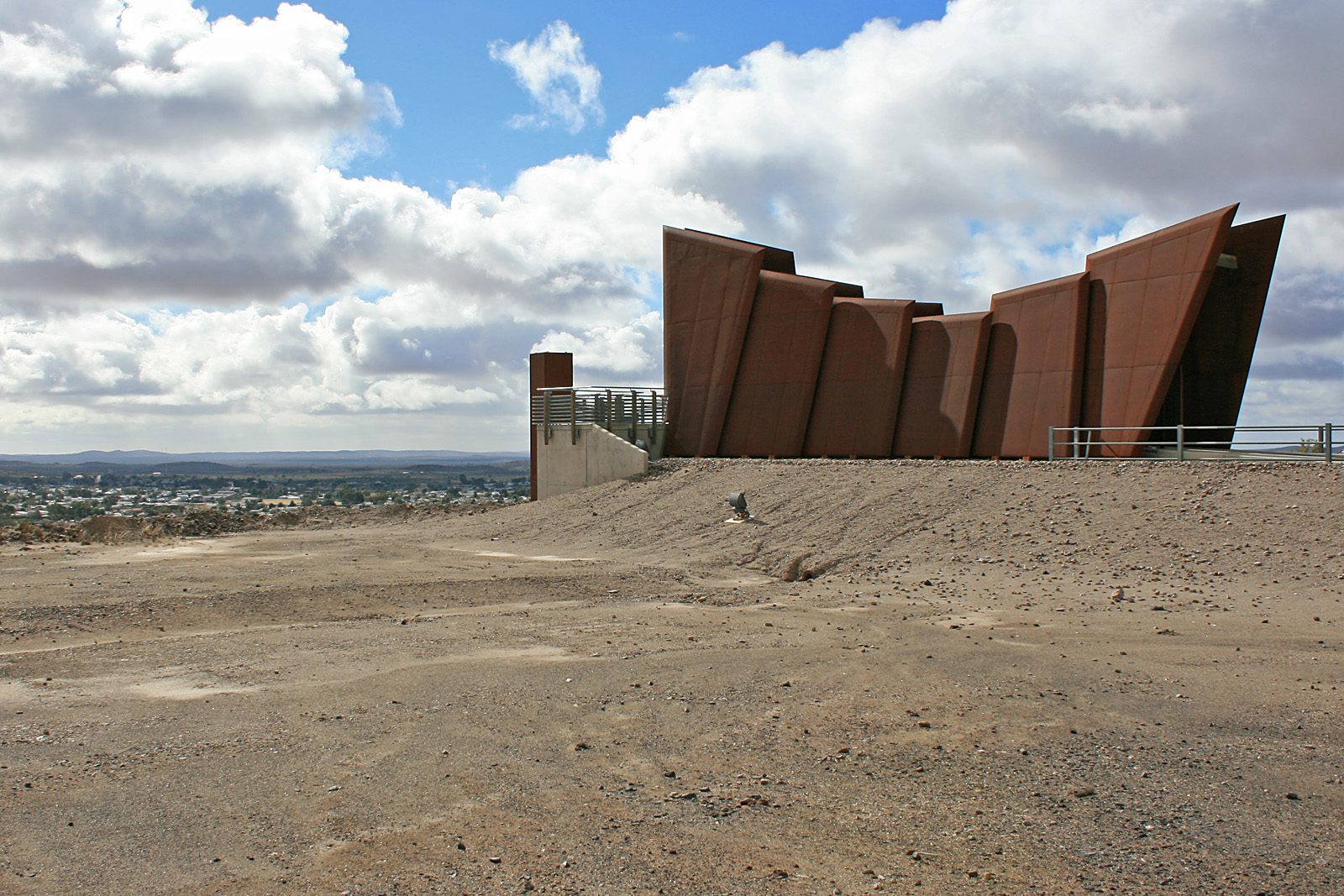
Miner's Memorial at the Line of Lode mine, commemorating over 800 workers who lost their lives working the mine

Health effects related to the mining industry were endemic to Broken Hill for many years. In 1895, as many as 1 in 50 miners were estimated to be affected by lead poisoning. As recently as 1991, over 80% of children under 5 years of age had blood lead levels higher than government guidelines.

In the early 1990s an extensive government funded Lead Education program was established and people with children under 5 were able to have free lead testing of their children, homes and gardens to assess lead contamination levels. Any property that had considerably high lead levels in ceiling dust or garden soil was provided with free remediation works to reduce potential exposure to lead dust.

Lead contamination continues to be one of the most serious health concerns, particularly in children in Broken Hill. All infants are required to receive blood tests to examine lead levels. Streets located next to the major mine, including Gaffney, Eyre, and Slag Streets have the unenviable award of being classified as some of the most contaminated residential streets in New South Wales.

== Media ==
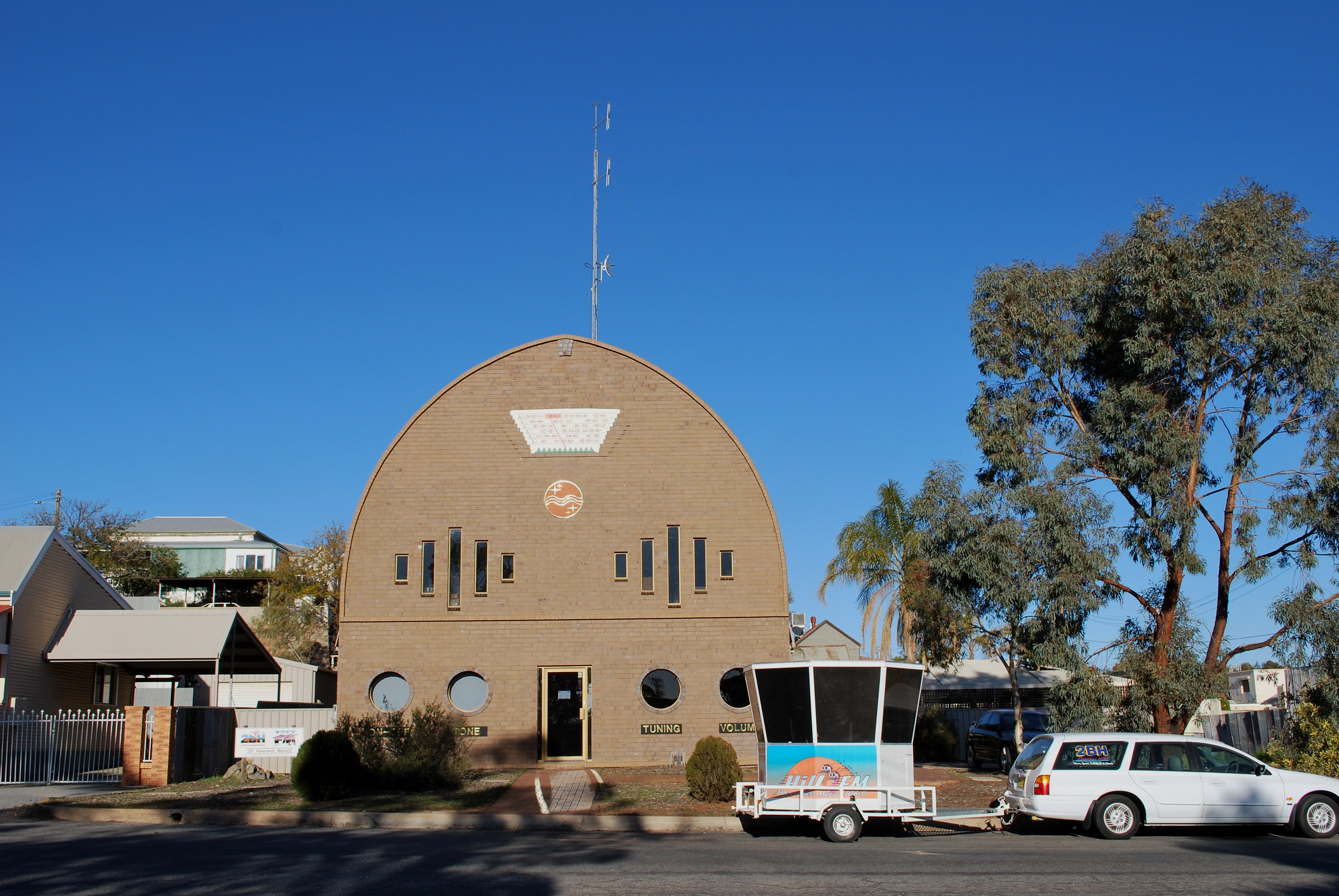
The 2BH studios

The town was served by the local newspaper, the Barrier Daily Truth. Major metropolitan and national newspapers from Adelaide and Sydney are also available in Broken Hill.

Local radio stations that are available in the Broken Hill region include:

- 2DRY FM – 107.7FM – community radio station
- Radio 1656 AM – Independent Local Radio
- ABC Local Radio as ABC Broken Hill – 999 AM (Since Broken Hill is on Central Time, ABC Local Radio's national and statewide programming is received from Adelaide instead of Sydney when the Broken Hill studios are not broadcasting local programming.)
- Triple J (ABC) – 102.1 FM
- ABC Radio National – 102.9 FM
- ABC Classic – 103.7 FM
- ABC NewsRadio – 104.5 FM
- 2BH Commercial Radio – 567 AM
- 2HIL Hill FM Commercial Radio – 96.5 FM
- Silver City FM 88 – 88 FM
- Hype FM – 87.6 FM
- Vision Christian Radio – 94.9 FM

The following television channels are available free-to-air in the Broken Hill region.

- ABC which broadcasts the ABC TV, ABC Kids/ABC Family, ABC Entertains and ABC News channels.
- SBS which broadcasts the SBS TV, SBS2, SBS Food, SBS World Movies and SBS WorldWatch channels.
- NITV
- Seven (formerly "Central Television".)
- 10
- Nine
- 10 Comedy (first digital multichannel ever launched in Broken Hill.)
- 10 Drama
- 9Go!
- 9Gem
- 9Life
- 7two
- 7mate

Although Broken Hill is in New South Wales, the programming schedules for these channels (excluding the ABC) is the same as those of Nine, Ten and Seven in Adelaide, with local adverts inserted and some variations for coverage of Australian Football League or National Rugby League matches, local and national news and current affairs programs, some lifestyle and light entertainment shows and infomercials. This is because Broken Hill, unlike the rest of New South Wales, is on Central Time. ABC channels are relayed from Sydney, so all programming is a half-hour earlier than advertised.

Seven Spencer Gulf and Broken Hill broadcasts Seven Network programming including AFL telecasts and other sporting and major events. 10 Spencer Gulf and Broken Hill broadcasts Network 10 output and some programming from 10 Drama and 10 Comedy. Nine Spencer Gulf and Broken Hill broadcasts Nine Network programming including NRL telecasts and other sporting events.

On 31 October 2010, GTS/BKN commenced broadcasting a full-time Channel Nine relay service. This service was initially a relay of TCN Sydney, with local advertising inserted until 2013 when it switched to a relay of NWS Adelaide.

The Seven Central service (unrelated to the original Central GTS/BKN) and Imparja Television are available via satellite and terrestrial transmission in the adjacent areas.

Broken Hill was featured during the second leg of The Amazing Race: Unfinished Business.

== Sport ==
Unusually for a town in New South Wales, Australian rules football is highly popular in Broken Hill and an important part of its culture. The Broken Hill Football League was founded in 1900 and consists of four clubs: North, South, West, and Central. AFL Broken Hill is affiliated with the South Australian National Football League due to the town's geographic proximity and cultural ties with South Australia.

Along with Australian Rules, Soccer is also played between 4 clubs – Celtic, St. Josephs, Alma Goats & West Panthers.

The Barrier District Cricket League is the predominant summer sports league in the region, with the same teams competing as in the Australian Rules Football league along with the addition of the Warriors Cricket Club competing in the B Grade competition. Currently there are A Grade, B Grade & Women's competitions contested during the Summer months. Representative cricketers for the region compete in the SACA Country Carnival, held in Adelaide during February each year under the Murray Districts/Barrier region.

Broken Hill Speedway is a speedway track located west of the city, off the Barrier Highway at (31°58′01″S 141°24′54″E). The 400m track holds sidecars and Demolition Derby. It held a major event in 2011, when hosting the motorcycle speedway final round of the Australian Solo Championship.

== Prison ==
Broken Hill Correctional Centre, the state's fourth-oldest prison still in operation, is located at 109 Gossan Street. It is important to the Far West region, as it allows for imprisonment closer to families who live in the area.

== Notable residents ==
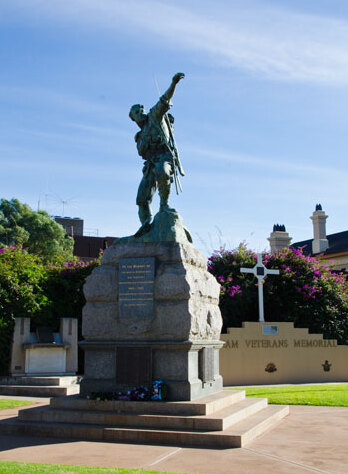
Broken Hill War Memorial

- Steve Abbott – comedian
- Jack Absalom – (1927–2019) artist
- Troy Andrews – wheelchair basketballer and shooter
- June Bronhill – (born June Mary Gough, 1929–2005) Australian internationally renowned soprano light opera singer and musical theatre performer, whose adopted (stage) surname is a contraction of the name of her hometown
- Stuart Bown – Australian rules footballer
- Chad Bugeja – association footballer
- Trevor Butler – Big Brother Australia 2004 winner
- John Casey – commentator
- Isaac Cumming – Australian rules footballer
- Kurtis Eichler – Australian journalist
- Murray Farquhar – (1918–1993) NSW Chief Stipendiary Magistrate (1971–1977)
- Stewart Finlay-McLennan – actor
- Mary Gilmore – poet
- "Lord Tim" Grose – (Tim Ian Grosse) heavy metal musician
- Florence May Harding – (1908–1971) artist and teacher
- Pro Hart – (1928–2006) artist
- Ion Idriess – (1889–1979) novelist
- Roy Inwood – Victoria Cross recipient
- Jamaine Jones – Australian rules footballer
- Rae Desmond Jones – poet and novelist
- The Kid Laroi – rapper, singer-songwriter
- Bruce McGregor – Australian rules footballer
- Albert Morris – essayist and naturalist
- Ronald Sydney Nyholm – chemist and teacher
- Corey Page – actor
- Chips Rafferty – actor
- Stephen Rowe – singer-songwriter
- David Simmons – Former federal MP for Calare and Minister
- Robin Sellick – commercial photographer
- Richard Thilthorpe Slee – General Manager, BHP Mine
- Dean Solomon – Australian rules footballer
- Brent Staker – Australian rules footballer
- Thelma Thomas – costume designer
- Nikki Visser – model and actor
- Taylor Walker – Australian rules footballer
- Susan Dorothea White – artist
- Edward Emerton Warren – businessman

== See also ==
- Broken Hill Women's Memorial
- St Josephs Convent
