= Seppelts Warehouse =

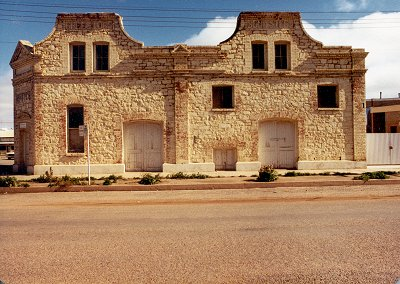

- Location within New South Wales Location within Australia
- 31.9612°S 141.4626°E
- Location: 160 Crystal Street, Broken Hill, City of Broken Hill, New South Wales, Australia

Site notes
- Owner: Broken Hill City Council

New South Wales Heritage Register
- Official name: Seppelts Warehouse; Bond and Free Store
- Type: state heritage (built)
- Designated: 2 April 1999
- Reference no.: 82
- Type: Warehouse/storage area
- Category: Commercial

Seppelts Warehouse is a heritage-listed former warehouse at 160 Crystal Street, Broken Hill, City of Broken Hill, New South Wales, Australia. It is also known as Bond and Free Store. It now operates as the Albert Kersten Mining and Minerals Museum. The property is owned by the Broken Hill City Council. It was added to the New South Wales State Heritage Register on 2 April 1999.

== History ==
In 1893 the Bond and Free Store was constructed for the South Australian Brewery Company. The store probably supplied miners and service industries with tools, commodities and ale. The building remained in the possession of the South Australian Brewery Company until 1923 when Seppelts & Son took over the building for a wine vinegar manufacture, storage and bottling store.

In 1850 Joseph Ernest Seppelt, his wife and three children, a group of skilled and semi-skilled employees and thirteen families arrived from Wustewaltersdorf in Silesia where Seppelt had had a family business distilling and compounding various liqueurs and cordials and making snuff.

The near famine conditions of the "Hungry Forties" in many parts of Europe had led to a great deal of unrest and migration and with the decline of his business Seppelt and his sizeable staff migrated to South Australia.

Seppelt ultimately moved to the township of Tanunda along with the women and children of the Silesian migrants. The men themselves went to Seppeltsfield four miles away in the country and returned to Tanunda for weekends. After experimenting with tobacco Seppelt planted corn and a small vineyard and constructed a storage cellar for wine. In 1924 Seppelt purchased the Bond and Free Store from the South Australian Brewery Company. Seppelt died in 1868 and his son Benno took up the work left unfinished by his father. By the 1960s the Seppelt Company owned 5,500 acres of land in South Australia, Victoria and New South Wales.

The Bond and Free Store was sold by the Seppelts in 1979.

In 1979 representations were made to the Heritage Council by the Broken Hill Historical Society expressing concern that the building was in danger of demolition and requesting protection under the Heritage Act. After discussions with the owner an Interim Conservation Order was placed over the building on 16 November 1979.

In 1981 Broken Hill Council wrote to the Heritage Council expressing concern for the future of the building as it was receiving no maintenance. On account of its heritage significance and the opportunity for sympathetic re-use, the Heritage Council recommended to the Minister that a Permanent Conservation Order be made.

As the Interim Conservation Order had expired another Interim Conservation Order was placed on 8 April 1982.

An objection to the Order was made by the owner of the property. Subsequently, under section 41 of the Heritage Act a Commission of Inquiry was held. The Commissioner in 1982 recommended that the Permanent Conservation Order be made and to consider the provision of funding to the owner to enable essential repairs.

A Permanent Conservation Order was placed over the property on 30 July 1982.

In 1984 Broken Hill Council purchased the property. In 1984 through the Heritage Assistance Program a grant was made available for the use of conservation architects. A further grant was made available for the restoration of the building. Heritage Council approval was securing the roof, cleaning and regrouting walls, repair of windows and fire-rating underside of timber floor.

It was transferred to the State Heritage Register on 2 April 1999.

In 2018, it houses the Albert Kersten Mining and Minerals Museum.

== Description ==
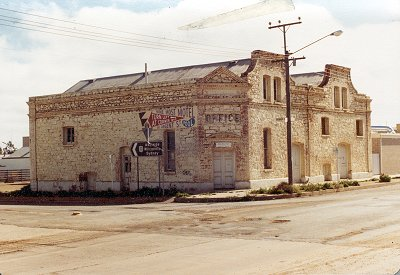
Side view of warehouses

Seppelts Warehouse is a tall single storey building plus basement. It is constructed of brick and rubble stone masonry walls with a galvanised corrugated iron roof and a timber ground floor. The basement floor is of earth.

The masonry walls and especially the parapets and gables are an excellent example of decorative brickwork for that period.

It appears that the bricks were made locally and the stone - gneiss - was gathered from the local area.

== Heritage listing ==
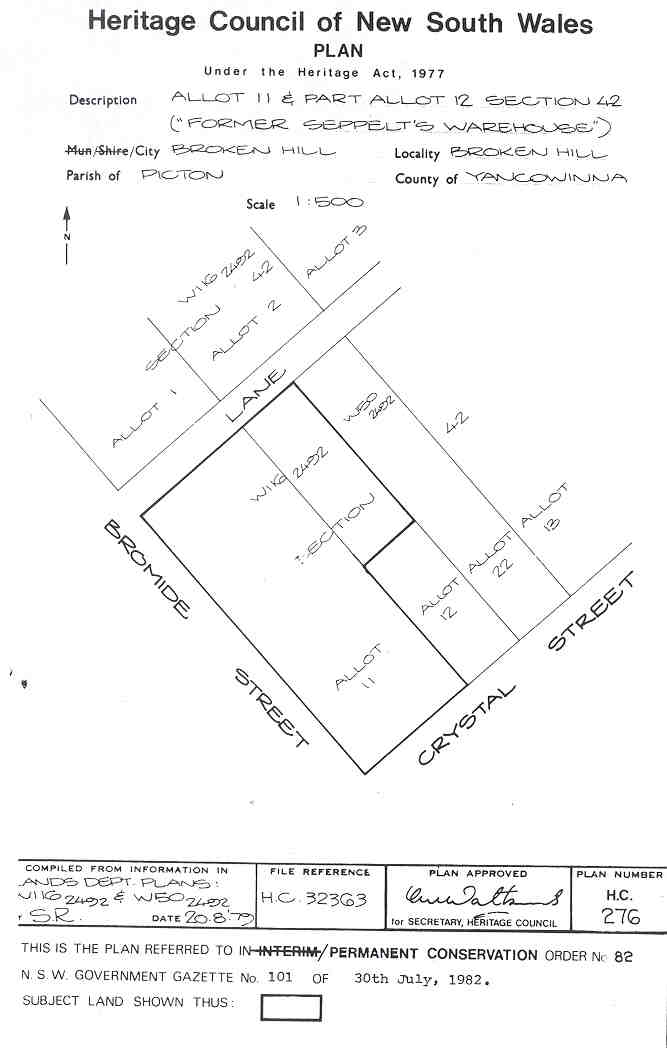
Heritage boundaries

Broken Hill was first established in 1883 and this building was one of the first warehouses to be erected within the area. This Bond and Free Store is an excellent example of the fine and decorative brickwork carried out by tradesman of that period erecting warehouses and work stores throughout Australia, and it is suggested that this building is the only surviving unaltered warehouse in Broken Hill today. The industrial character of the building, fenestration method of construction and the contribution to streetscape, blend together to give a culturally significant building reflecting the attitudes and needs of the Broken Hill mining community during the initial development years.

Seppelts Warehouse was listed on the New South Wales State Heritage Register on 2 April 1999 having satisfied the following criteria.

The place is important in demonstrating the course, or pattern, of cultural or natural history in New South Wales.

Broken Hill was first established in 1883 and this building was one of the first warehouse to be erected within the area.

The place is important in demonstrating aesthetic characteristics and/or a high degree of creative or technical achievement in New South Wales.

This Bond and Free Store is an excellent example of the fine and decorative brickwork carried out by tradesman of that period erecting warehouses and work stores throughout Australia.

The place has strong or special association with a particular community or cultural group in New South Wales for social, cultural or spiritual reasons.

The industrial character of the building, fenestration method of construction and the contribution to the streetscape, blend together to give a culturally significant building reflecting the attitudes and needs of the Broken Hill mining community during the initial development years.

The place possesses uncommon, rare or endangered aspects of the cultural or natural history of New South Wales.

It is suggested that this building is the only surviving unaltered warehouse in Broken Hill today.
