= First BHP Offices Chimney Ruin =

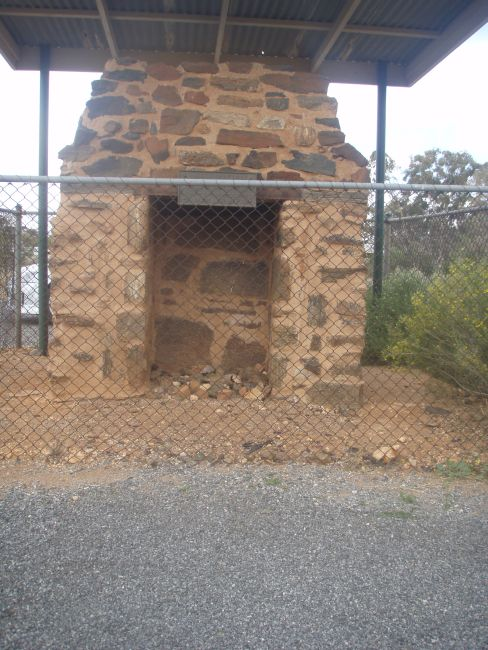

- Location within New South Wales Location within Australia
- 31.9596°S 141.4712°E
- Location: Willyama Common, east of corner of Gaffney and Oxide Streets, Proprietary Square, Broken Hill, City of Broken Hill, New South Wales, Australia

History
- Built: 1885

Site notes
- Owner: Broken Hill City Council

New South Wales Heritage Register
- Official name: BHP Chimney Ruin of First Offices; Site of first BHP Offices; BHP Fireplaces; Chimney ruins
- Type: state heritage (archaeological-terrestrial)
- Designated: 23 April 2010
- Reference no.: 1820
- Type: Mine office
- Category: Mining and Mineral Processing
- Builders: Tom Phin and A.W.B. Orman

The First BHP Offices Chimney Ruin is the heritage-listed ruin of the original offices of BHP in Broken Hill in the far west of New South Wales, Australia. The original offices were built in 1885 by Tom Phin and A. W. B. Orman on what is now known as Willyama Common, east of the corner of Gaffney and Oxide Streets in Proprietary Square. The property is owned by Broken Hill City Council. It was added to the New South Wales State Heritage Register on 23 April 2010. This heritage listing also refers to it as the Site of first BHP Offices, BHP Fireplaces and Chimney ruins.

== History ==
=== Beginnings of Broken Hill ===
The township of Broken Hill was developed on land that was first settled by Europeans as the Mount Gipps Station for grazing sheep. While employed on the station by George McCulloch, workers Charles Rasp, David James and James Poole pegged the first mineral lease in the "Broken Hill Paddock" in 1883 after rich mineral deposits were found in the area. The paddock itself took a name first used by explorer Charles Sturt in 1844.

A further six mineral leases (now known as the Line of Lode) were pegged out, with George Urquhart, George Lind and Philip Charley joining with McCulloch, Rasp, James and Poole to form the Syndicate of Seven. In 1885, Charley found silver on his lease. A township was soon surveyed and Broken Hill was initially known as a shanty town with an entire suburb named "Canvas Town" for its temporary buildings.

The first survey of Broken Hill was made by E. H. Dawson and began on 27 August 1884 when there was little in the area but a few tents and humpies. Development of the town began from 1885 onwards. The first house was built on Block 14 for Mr. William Jamieson, the manager of the Broken Hill Mining Co. Then came Delamore's Hotel, which was pulled down out Lake's Camp way, carted into Broken Hill, and re-erected by A. F. Pincombe, one of the old pioneers who was well known on the Hill. In quick succession followed Sully's old store, the Silver King Hotel, and Brazill and Jones' store, then came J. R. Stewart, baker, Neilson & Co., butchers;, Langemen's billiard saloon, Vaughan's Hotel, Ledgard's, Lee's and Finn's, & Co. Argent Street began to assume a busy aspect.

The town boundaries of the "Town of Willyama" were proclaimed on 24 August 1887. The Municipal District of Broken Hill was constituted by a Proclamation dated 24 September 1888 to include "the Towns of Willyama and Alma and other lands." The Proclamation, gazetted 24 July 1907, "hereby constitute as a City the said Municipality of Broken Hill."

=== The Chimney ===
The original syndicate of seven which held the seven mining leases on the broken hill named their venture the Broken Hill Mining Company. Following the discovery of rich silver ores in early 1885, the syndicate appointed William Jamieson as manager in April 1885 and registered the name Broken Hill Proprietary Co. Ltd, in June 1885. The BHP chimney marks the site of the hut built by Tom Phin and W. B. Orman for the company in May 1885 to house Jamieson. It was located amongst the busy mining area at the Line of Lode, the rocky outcrop which contained the ore body and was used for a short time as the BHP works office where all mining business was conducted. Although Jamieson resigned at the end of the year, during that period at this site he undertook planning of the original development work at the mine including the erection of the first smelters. The BHP Chimney is the only remaining remnant of the hut which dates from the year that mining activities began in Broken Hill and when it began its development as a remote inland town.

No photographs have been located of the hut which housed the original BHP offices.

By 1888, wooden staff houses and a handsome stone office were erected about 500 metres to the northwest. The site was now part of the Block 14 Mine. By the 1890s, all BHP staff housing was provided at Proprietary Square.

In 1908 the BHP Chimney was already a ruin but described as "One of the most historical spots on the Hill. Beside this stack in a large tent there lived in the early days Mr. Wm. Jamieson and his assistant A. Reid, W.R. Thomas, Alf Orman, two or three axemen, cook. It was in this tent the destinies of Broken Hill were laid, it was here that all business with the mine was transacted, and here in this tent Mr. Thomas drew the plans of Block 14, British, Block 10. The Company has lately placed a railing round the old spot, in order that it may be preserved." By this time BHP had erected a wooden railing around the chimney so that it might be preserved.

BHP ceased operations at Broken Hill in 1939. In 2001, BHP became part of BHP Billiton, the world's largest resources company.

The BHP Chimney thus represents the birthplace of BHP, a company which helped shape Australia's mining and industrial landscape.

The BHP Chimney is located on Crown land reserved for Temporary Common, known locally as the Willyama Common, which is administered by Broken Hill City Council as the trust manager for the Willyama Common Trust. Consolidated Mining Lease No. 7, held by CBH Resources Pty Ltd, includes the site but there are no plans to conduct surface mining in this area.

The top section of the chimney has been rebuilt at some time since 1907 and the structure modestly covered with a tin roof on four wooden columns. Under the supervision of Broken Hill City Council's heritage advisor in 2008, the chimney was repointed and interpretation signage added to the site.

== Description ==
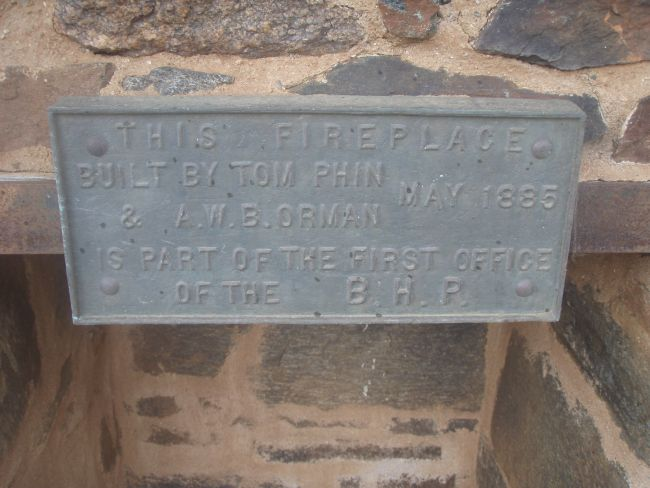
Plaque on the fireplace

The chimney is a ruin, the only remains of a worker's cottage of which it once formed a part. It is constructed in random stone and brick.

It is surrounded by a recently constructed wire mesh fence and protected by a corrugated iron roof shelter resting on four metal poles.

There is interpretative signage in weathered metal which reads:

'This fireplace built by Tom Phin and A.W.B. Orman 1885 is part of the first office of the B.H.P.'

There is also more detailed contemporary interpretative signage (dating from 2008) with images describing the chimney and its history within Broken Hill. It reads:

'This stone chimney marks the site of the hut built by the Broken Hill Mining Company (soon to become BHP) in May 1885 to house its first manager William Jamieson. It was, for a short time, used as the BHP works office where all mining business was conducted. In 2001, BHP became part of BHP Billiton, the world's largest resources company. As such this site represents the birthplace of BHP, a company which helped shape Australia's mining and industrial landscape.
'About 1907, BHP erected a wooden railing around the chimney so that it might be preserved. The top section has since been rebuilt and the structure covered.
'No photographs of the hut which housed the original BHP office have been located but the photo at right shows its location amongst the busy mining area of the Line of Lode.
'[Caption to] BHP SOUTH SMELTERS 1888. This photo was taken from near the corner of Oxide and Chrystal streets looking towards the site of the chimney which was located in the foreground or just to the left of view. A small hut and chimney can be seen partly obscured by a small tree in the centre foreground. (Rasp Memorial Library).
'The original syndicate of seven which held the seven mining leases on the broken hill named their venture the Broken Hill Mining Company. Following the discovery of rich silver ores in early 1885, the company appointed Jamieson as manager in April 1885. Within two weeks, with workmen Alf Orman and Tom Phin, Jamieson established a camp at the foot of Block 14. Here they erected the first structures at Broken Hill of which only the original chimney still stands.
'The syndicate registered the Broken Hill Proprietary Co. Ltd in June 1885 but Jemieson resigned at the end of the year. During that period he undertook, at this site, planning of the original development work at the mine including the erection of the first smelters. By 1888, wooden staff houses and a handsome stone office were erected about 500 metres to the northwest. The site was now part of the Block 14 Mine. By the 1890s, all BHP staff housing was provided at proprietary Square. BHP ceased operations at Broken Hill in 1939.'

The chimney was reported as being in good condition as at 7 December 2009, following the conservation works including stone repointing in 2008. The signage interpretation was added at this time.

== Heritage listing ==
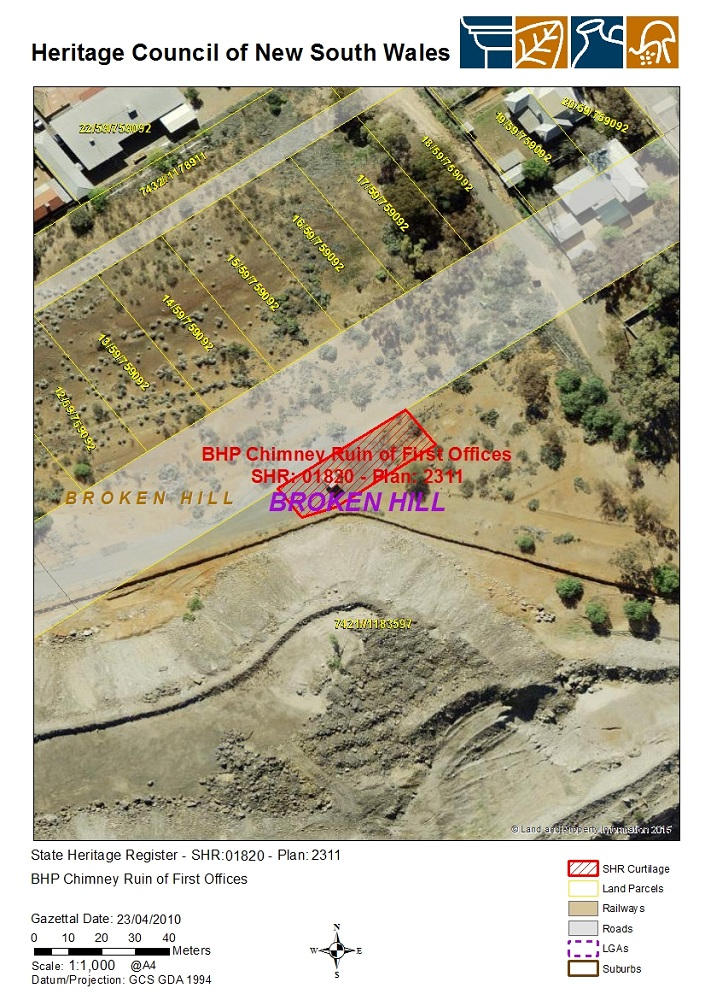
Heritage boundaries

The BHP Chimney Ruin of First Offices is of State significance as the last remaining remnant of the original offices used by the huge Australian mining company BHP. It was originally located in one of the first residences built for early miners' accommodation at Broken Hill, which was also used as the first works office for Broken Hill Proprietary Ltd (BHP) (at that time known as Broken Hill Mining Company), which today, as BHP Billiton, is amongst the world's largest mining and resource companies. As such, this chimney represents the formation of BHP, a company which has helped to shape Australia's mining, industrial and immigration policy. The fireplace itself was reputedly built in May 1885, the year that Broken Hill began mining activities and started to develop as a remote inland town.

BHP Chimney Ruin of First Offices was listed on the New South Wales State Heritage Register on 23 April 2010 having satisfied the following criteria.

The place is important in demonstrating the course, or pattern, of cultural or natural history in New South Wales.

The BHP Chimney Ruin of First Offices is of State historical significance as the only surviving remnant of the first offices of BHP, a mining company which has helped to shape Australia's mining, industrial and immigration policy. The chimney was originally part of a worker's cottage built to accommodate some of the first miners in Broken Hill but which was soon put into use as the first Broken Hill Proprietary Ltd works office (at that time Broken Hill Mining Company). The fireplace was reputedly built by Tom Phin and W.B. Orman in May 1885, thus dating from the same year that began mining activities began in Broken Hill and coinciding with its formation as a remote inland town.

The place has a strong or special association with a person, or group of persons, of importance of cultural or natural history of New South Wales's history.

The BHP Chimney Ruin of First Offices is of State significance for its historical associations with the origins of BHP, a company which has helped to shape Australia's mining, industrial and immigration policy and which conducted its first offices in the cottage which this fireplace once warmed.
