= Broken Hill ore deposit =

Mine in New South Wales, Australia

Coordinates: 31°57′S 141°27′E

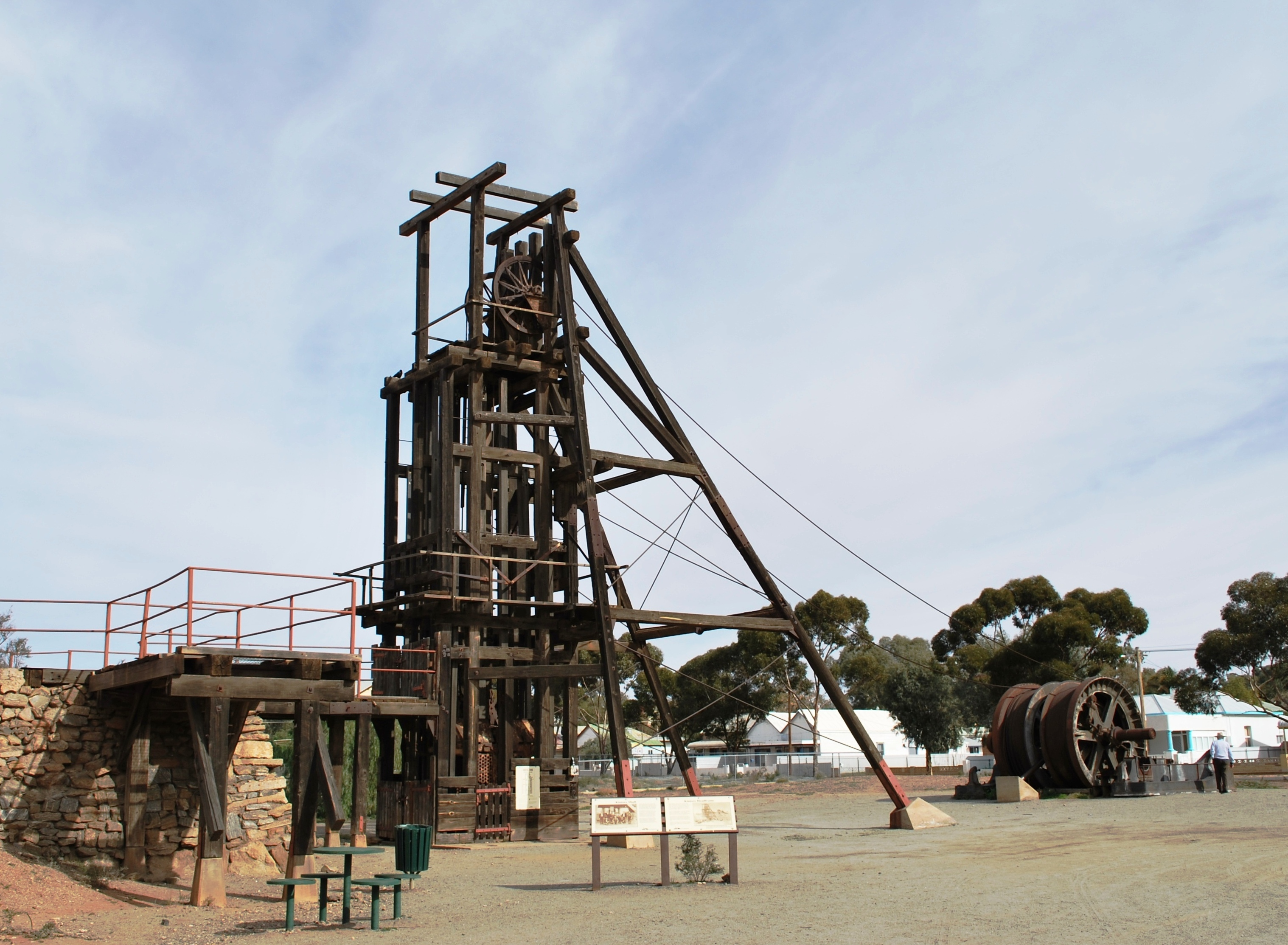
Old Kintore headframe, now a museum exhibit, Broken Hill

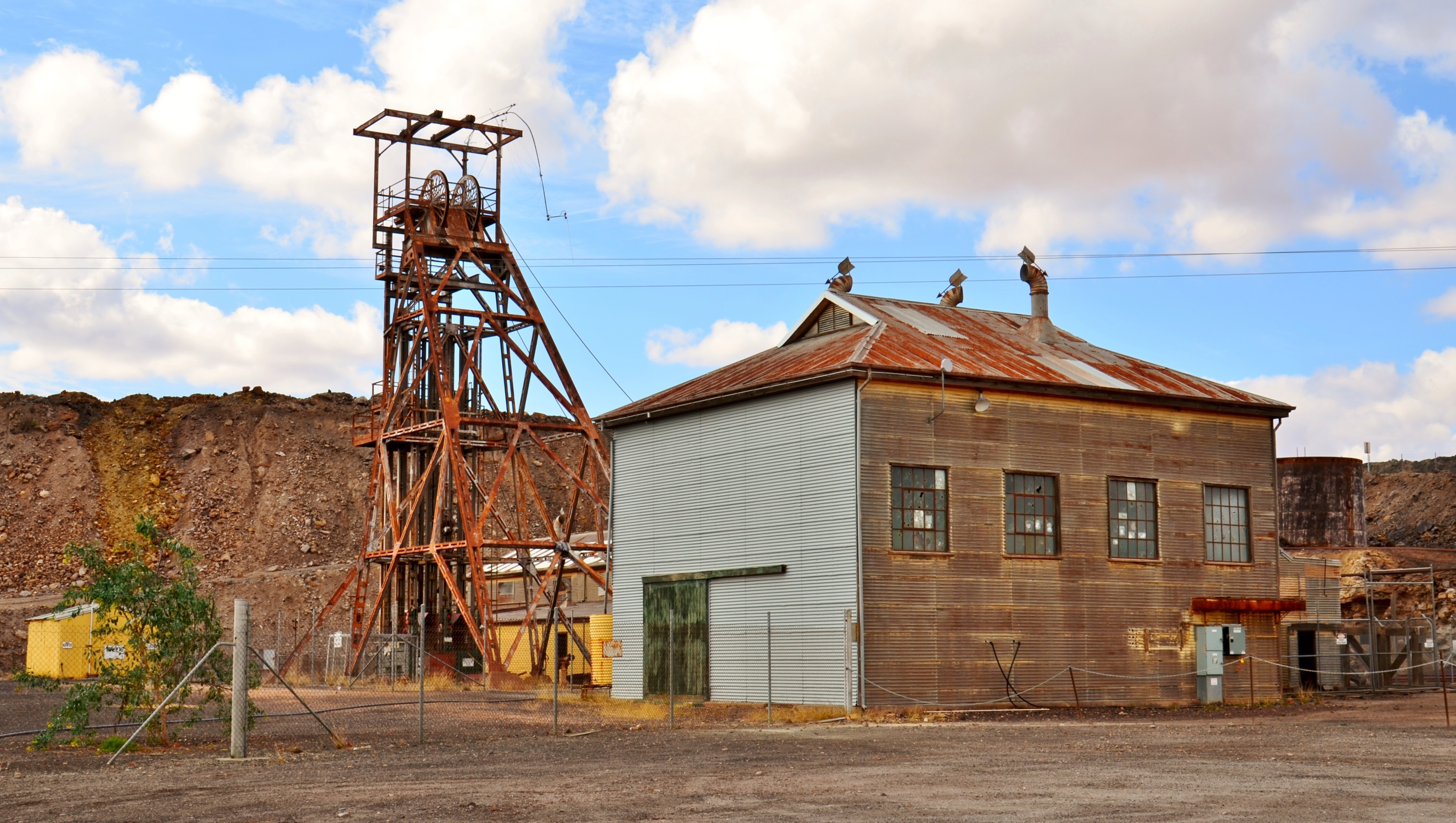
Former Delprat mine, Line of Lode, Broken Hill, 2017

The Broken Hill Ore Deposit is located underneath Broken Hill in western New South Wales, Australia, and is the namesake for the town. It is arguably the world's richest and largest zinc-lead ore deposit.

== History ==
=== Discovery ===
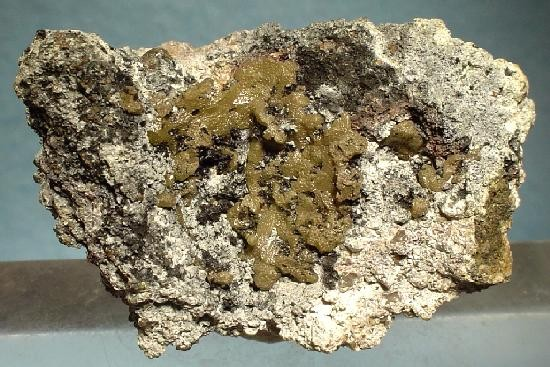
Chlorargyrite lining a vug in gossan at Broken Hill

Charles Sturt made a pencil sketch of the area in 1844 and noted iron ore along an isolated hill. In 1866 the Mount Gipps sheep station named their paddock, which embraced the lode outcrop, Broken Hill. However, the hill was thought to be mullock. On 5 September 1883, a Mount Gipps boundary rider named Charles Rasp staked a claim on the outcrop because it looked like tin oxide as described in his prospecting guide book. With six others he staked the entire outcrop. In 1884, the syndicate reorganized as the Broken Hill Mining Company. Horn silver was discovered in 1885 and the Broken Hill Proprietary Company Limited was incorporated.

Charles Rasp discovered the gossan or weathered sulfide outcrop of massive lead-zinc sulfides on a feature known as Broken Hill. Rasp reported finding massive galena, sphalerite, cerussite and other oxide minerals, but was most concerned with the galena, a primary source of lead. His reports, believed exaggerated at the time, of masses of lead in the desert, soon proved true and sparked a 'lead rush' similar to gold rushes.

=== Exploitation ===
Broken Hill was exploited initially by small prospectors working the gossan for easily won galena, and soon dozens of shafts were sunk. Ore was carted to South Australia by camel trains, wagons and pack mules. A major secondary source of income became apparent, with extremely high silver grades recovered, including native silver, and other rare silver minerals present in abundance.

Open-pit mining of silver oxide ores was the norm from 1885 to 1898, with local smelting. From 1898 until 1915, the lead-zinc-silver sulfide minerals were developed with the concentrates treated overseas. Starting in 1915, the concentrates were treated entirely in Australia. The central part of the lode was depleted by 1940 and production was concentrated in the north and south ends. Properties in the 1950s included North Broken Hill Limited, Broken Hill South Limited, The Zinc Corporation Limited, and New Broken Hill Consolidated Limited. Through 1946, 63.8 million tons of ore have produced 8.6 million tons of lead, 5.2 million tons of zinc, 538 million ounces of silver, and 165,000 ounces of gold.

Mining has gradually moved away from the initial small prospectors, in line with the experience in all other major mineral fields, toward gradual consolidation of claims and tenure, an increase in tenure and mine size and efficiencies in operations resulting in smaller workforces. This has accelerated in the last part of the 20th century via the formation of the Broken Hill Proprietary Company and its exit from Broken Hill, toward only two operators at present, utilising highly efficient bulk underground mechanised mining.

Broken Hill South Limited ceased operations in 1972 and its leases were acquired by Minerals Mining & Metallurgy (MMM). Underground mining stopped in 1976 and open pit mining is concentrated in the Blackwood Open Cut, which commenced in 1973, and the Kintore Open Cut. Stope fill, plus remnant supergene silver and sulphide ore characterize the ore reserve.

Pasminco took over the leases of Zinc Corporation and New Broken Hill Consolidated. Their main shafts included ZC, NBHC and Southern Cross. These ZC Mines Leases lie south of the MMM Mining Leases along the Broken Hill "line of lode".

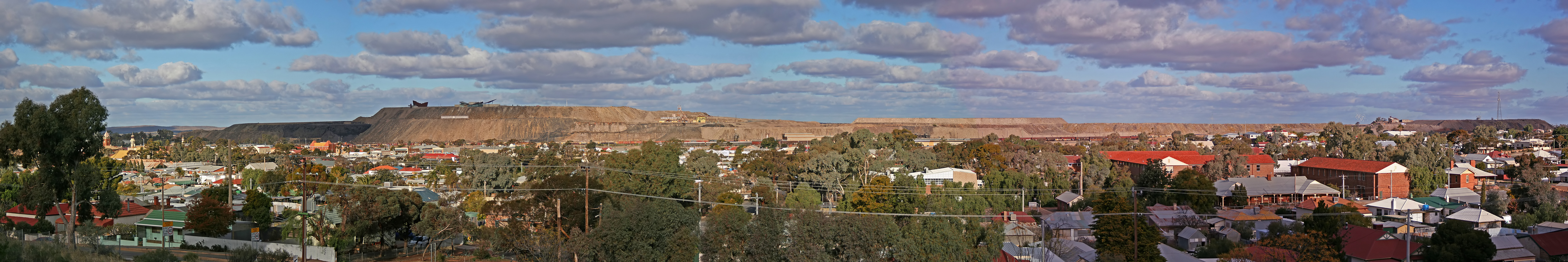
Broken Hill township, backed by the man-made mullock heaps from mining along the Line of Lode

=== Drought endangers mining operation in the 1950s ===
By the early 1950s the Broken Hill area had suffered a major drought of over eight years which was close to shutting down the mining operation. Due to the acute water shortage problem, the mine owners set in motion what became at by that time the largest use of a train for a massive water lift. Over a period of several months, special tanker car trains transported over 250 million gallons of water 40 miles by train which was pumped from the Darling River near Horse Lake, west to the small Mount Gipps rail siding where the water was transferred to large storage tanks that were built for the purpose. From the Mount Gipps storage tanks the water flows down hill through a large pipe to the Stephens Creek Reservoir, Broken Hill's main water storage facility. From Stephens Reservoir the water makes another downhill journey by a large pipe to the Broken Hills mining operation.

== Geology ==
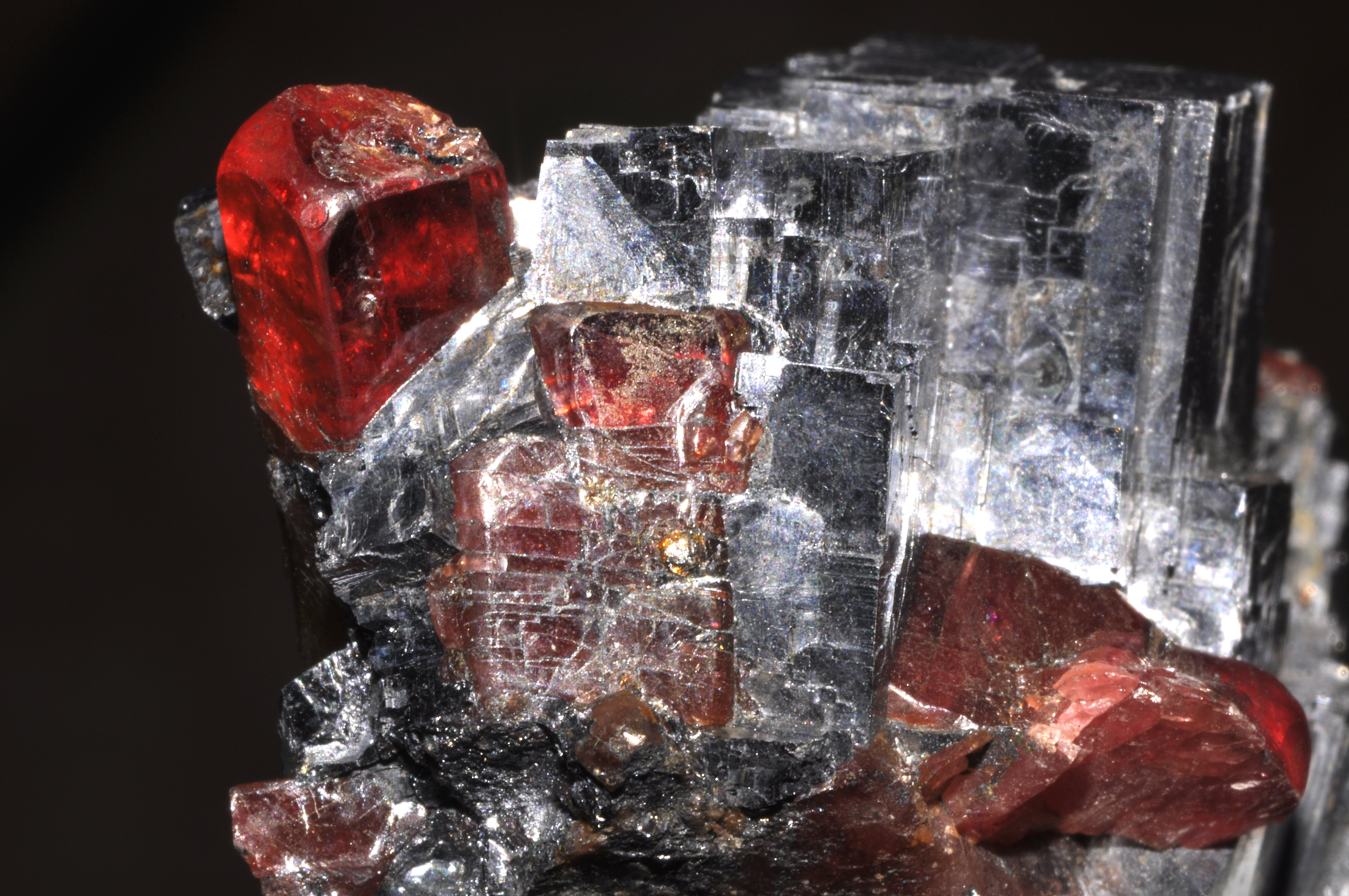
Rhodonite on galena from the Broken Hill mine. Such specimens are popular with mineral collectors.

According to Gustafson, "The Broken Hill lodes are massive lead-zinc sulphide replacement orebodies forming (before erosion) a long continuous, irregular flat, curving pencil of ore roughly 2,000-3,000 high and 300 feet thick. In longitudinal section, the deposit describes a broad arc, flat in its middle (highest) portion, and pitching downward at each end...continuously mineralized for a horizontal distance of more than 3 miles." Sphalerite and galena are the main metallic minerals. The simplified geology of the Broken Hill ore body is a series of boomerang-shaped, highly sheared and disrupted ribbon-like and poddy massive sulfide lenses which outcropped in the central section (the old "Broken Hills" gossan hills) and plunge steeply north and moderately south.

The Broken Hill ore body is hosted within the gneisses of the Willyama Supergroup, a mesoproterozoic sequence of sillimanite gneisses. The original sediments consisted of alternating clays, sandy clays, sands, granitic sills, gabbro sills, and pegmatite sheets. Deformation, folding, and metamorphism converted the sediments into gneiss, the granitic rocks into augen, and the gabbro into amphibolites and hornblende schists.

The ore consists of massive, recrystallised sphalerite-rich, galena-sphalerite and galena-rich sulfide lenses in folded horizons, known as No. 2 Lens Formation and No.3 Lens Formation. Both have distinctive metal ratios and gangue minerals. The ore boundaries are parallel to the bedding planes. According to Gustafson, "There is evidence that the ore has been introduced into an old, already folded, rock and has replaced certain favourable layers of that rock, particle by particle, with large tonnages of garnet, rhodonite, fluorite, marmatite (and wurtzite), galena, and other minerals that constitute the orebodies." The Potosi-Footwall Gneiss is found on both sides of the main lode. The ore often consists up to 100% lead-zinc sulfides, with little or no pyrite, chalcopyrite or gangue sulfides.

The footwall to the mineralization is a psammopelite gneiss, consisting of feldspar, quartz, garnet, biotite and amphibole, with a pelite gneiss on the hanging wall. The footwall gneiss contains anomalous mineral chemistries including a rare lead-rich feldspar and manganese-rich garnet chemistries. Ore is predominantly hosted at this stratigraphic break, but much of the ore body is structurally remobilised or offset into both the hangingwall and footwall, and the geometry of the ore deposit is particularly complex on the local scale.

=== Genesis ===
The genesis of the Broken Hill ore body is of historical importance to geologists, particularly in Australia, as it is a well known ore body and one of the most studied in the world, with over 1,500 papers published to date. It is also of current importance, as conceptions of the genesis of this ore deposit, and its structural and stratigraphic setting drives exploration for repetitions of the ore deposit along strike, and in finding analogues elsewhere in the world.

The genesis of Broken Hill is also of interest as it is of enduring controversy and conjecture, with the jury still mostly out on the matter although consensus has been reached on several key facets of the genetic processes which resulted in Broken Hill's formation. The interpretations presented below are the most palatable middle view of a range of opinions.

==== SEDEX mineralisation ====
Broken Hill is widely considered to be a sedimentary exhalative (SEDEX) deposit which has been extensively reworked and modified by metamorphism and shearing. Key evidence for this overarching theory includes the association of silver, lead and zinc, which is found in many other SEDEX deposits worldwide and the position of the bulk of mineralization at a key stratigraphic contact between psammite and psammopelite gneisses. But there is mounting evidence that the situation at Broken Hill is much more complex.

The Potosi Gneiss, and the manganiferous garnet horizon, are considered key indicators of original bedding orientation (S0) and are thus key exploration targets, as there is a proven association of anomalous lead and zinc within the gneissic stratigraphy with these horizons on a regional basis.

==== Metamorphic overprints ====
The Broken Hill ore deposit is hosted within the Proterozoic gneisses of the Broken Hill Block, adjacent to the Curnamona Craton in South Australia. The terrane in which Broken Hill is hosted has undergone a series of several metamorphic deformations at amphibolite facies. This has resulted in the 'squeezing' of the lead and zinc sulfides into the current basic boomerang shape, and resulted in the separation of the ore body into zinc-rich and lead-rich lodes and domains.

The lodes themselves show various structural facies, and show variable responses to shearing, though mostly in a ductile fashion. Many lodes, particularly the lead lodes, have sharp contacts with gneissic host rocks, indicating they have become structurally relocated during peak metamorphism. Similarly, it is conjectured that the current position of the zinc and lead lodes at Broken Hill may not necessarily be related to their original position along the bedding planes (S0), or vertically within the stratigraphic section.

It has taken some considerable effort to 'see through' the overwhelming structural overprint of metamorphism to infer the SEDEX classification.

==== Metasomatism ====
The lower part of the Willyama Supergroup has undergone intense sodium alteration, particularly the Broken Hill Block and subdomain. This has resulted in pervasive albite alteration particularly in the Olary domain adjacent to Broken Hill.

The influence of high-temperature metamorphic fluids on the ore deposit cannot be discounted, although it is considered less central to genetic factors than previous theories of hydrothermal origins for the deposits. The current consensus view is that metasomatic overprints are present as a result of the focusing of flow through the zones of weakness around the massive sulfides, which are ductile failure loci in themselves.

Metasomatic effects include re-equilibrating isotopic systematics of the lead-zinc sulfides and wall-rocks, and introduction of rare elements into the sulfide bodies to form one of the most diverse mineralogical assemblages in the Earth's crust, with 1500 or more mineral species recognized at Broken Hill, including several dozen not reported elsewhere.

The association of the Broken Hill line of lode with a horizon of manganiferous garnets is considered to be partly a function of a potential protolith of exhalative manganiferous chert, metamorphically upgraded to a garnetiferous gneiss, and perhaps some reconstitution of that protolith by metasomatism associated with the nearby massive sulfides.

=== Broken Hill type ore deposits ===
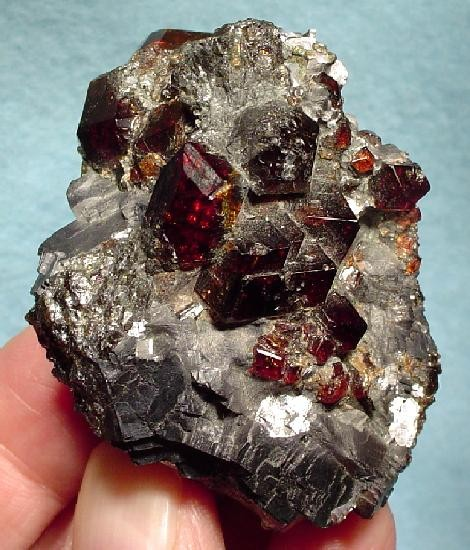
Spessartine garnet crystals in massive galena, Broken Hill

Broken Hill is the type locality for a class of ore deposits known as Broken Hill Type, or BHT, ore deposits. This is a classification grouping of similar deposits for use in ore genesis theories and mineral exploration methodologies.

The key criteria for BHT ore deposits are;

- Association with major sedimentary packages of sandstone and siltstone protoliths sequences in highly disturbed metamorphic terranes.
- A Proterozoic age is considered important, as no other major SEDEX lead-zinc deposits of this style are known from the Phanerozoic or Archean.
- Association with manganiferous garnets.

== See also ==
- Brokenhillite, a rare mineral found in Broken Hill in the far-western regions of New South Wales
