= Central Mine Manager's Residence =

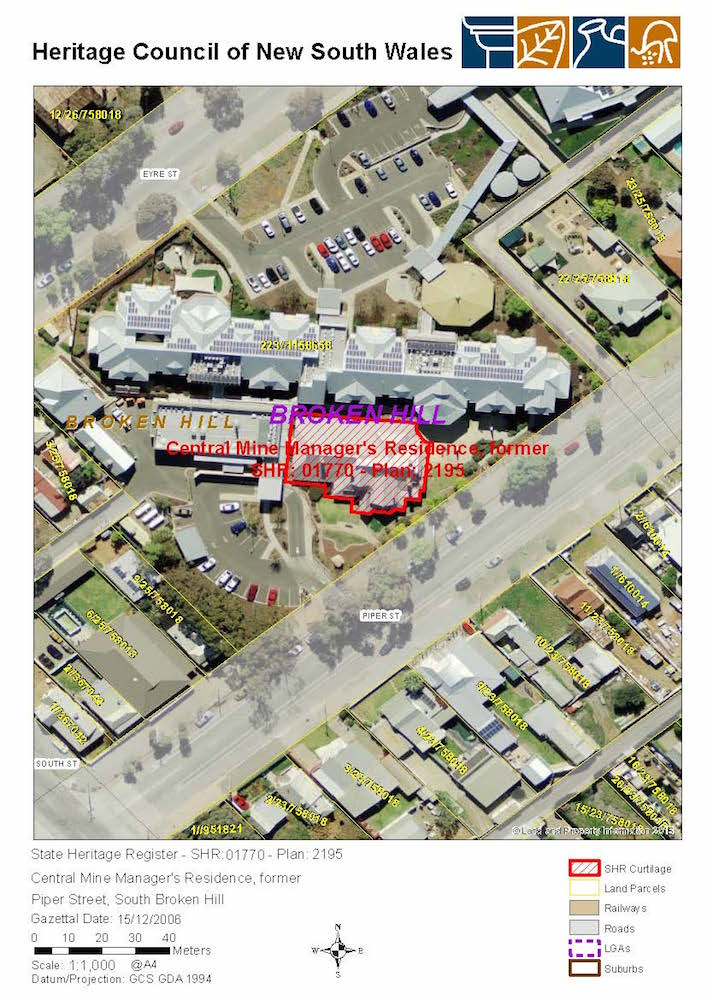
- Heritage boundaries

- Location within New South Wales Location within Australia
- 31.9757°S 141.4617°E
- Location: Piper Street, South Broken Hill, City of Broken Hill, New South Wales, Australia

History
- Built: 1903–1903

Site notes
- Owner: Southern Cross Care Broken Hill Incorporated

New South Wales Heritage Register
- Official name: Central Mine Manager's Residence, former; St Anne's Home of Compassion; Former Central Mine Managers House
- Type: state heritage (built)
- Designated: 15 December 2006
- Reference no.: 1770
- Type: Mansion
- Category: Residential buildings (private)

Central Mine Manager's Residence is a heritage-listed former residence, orphanage for Aboriginal girls and now nursing home administration building at Piper Street, South Broken Hill, New South Wales, in the state's Far West region. It was built in 1903. It is also known as St Anne's Home of Compassion. The property is owned by Southern Cross Care Broken Hill Incorporated. It was added to the New South Wales State Heritage Register on 15 December 2006.

== History ==
=== Mining history in Broken Hill ===
The term Broken Hill was first used by the early British Explorer Charles Sturt in his diaries during his search for an inland sea in 1844. Western plains towns far away from the major rivers, such as Broken Hill, owe their existence to the mineral discoveries made in the decade after 1875, when spectacular deposits of gold, silver, copper and opal were found.

In the early 1880s silver chloride was discovered in the Line of Lode in Broken Hill by Charles Rasp, a boundary rider from the Mount Gipps Station. A syndicate of miners floated a company, the Broken Hill Proprietary Company, or BHP as it is known today. A township was soon surveyed. The main street was filled with hotels and flimsy offices and saloons. A two chain (40.3 metres) wide road knee deep in dust and crowded with men from all corners of the world selling shares at tremendous prices for alleged mines. Photographs of the township of Broken Hill and the mining activities were exhibited in London at the 1908 Franco-British exhibition.

Broken Hill was initially a shanty town with an entire suburb named "Canvas Town" for its temporary buildings. The streets in the centre of the town were named after minerals, Argent (i.e. Silver) and Chloride being important cross streets. The streets that intersect are named for the Mining Companies: Bonanza, Central, Comstock and South. South of the massive Line of Lode the streets that run parallel to the lode record the early mine managers: Eyre, Piper, Hebbard, Patton, Wilson, Morish, Boughtman and Jamieson. A 1937 plan shows the layout of the leases on the line of load and the street layout of South Broken Hill. The leases interrupted Eyre Street, extending to Piper Street.

The living and working conditions of the miners were harsh, largely due to the climatic extremes of the outback. In contrast the mine managers lived in substantial residences with elegant wrap-around verandas. Block 9 of the lode was an irregular wedge shape between Blocks 8 and 10 which eventually became known as the Central Mine. Originally leased by Thomas Nutt in 1884, Nutt sold his lease to the Central Broken Hill Company in 1886. During the depression of the 1890s the company changed hands, and was acquired in 1895 by the Sulphide Corporation Ltd. The Sulphide Corporation leased other blocks on the lode as well as Block 9.

The Central Mine had its share of industrial disputes and fatalities. A strike occurred in 1918, and a ballad "Blue Whiskers" survives recording the use of scab labour in September 1918, a version of the Scabbers hymn. The Memorial to Mullockers records the death of two young workers at the Central Mine. The Central Mine was also subject to a series of "creeps" resulting in subsidence and the destruction of the above ground plant. In 1923 an underground fire resulted in the closure of the mine for two years. The Central Mine continued to operate until 1940, having produced 6 million tonnes of ore, and eight millions in dividends. Part of the lease was acquired by Minerals, Mining and Metallurgy Ltd in 1972.

The original mining leases of the Line of Lode have now been amalgamated. The South Mine includes 11 of the original leases, incorporating the Central Mine, the British Mine, and the Junction Mine. Mining activities still occur at the Line of Lode. Structures and evidence of the mining leases survives.

=== Central Mine Manager James Hebbard ===
The Central Mine Manager's Residence was built for James and Olivia Hebbard in 1903. The Hebbard family originated in Cornwall, in the South of England, an area with an extensive mining history. James Hebbard's father migrated to South Australia in 1849, originally settling at Burra where copper had been discovered in 1845. Miners from Cornwall, Scotland, Wales and other parts of Britain all settled in separate sections of the township of Burra. Olivia Hebbard (née Pope) was the daughter of a Cornish miner who had tried his luck in both Ballarat and Bendigo in Victoria, presumably during the 1850s gold rush. By the 1870s the lode of copper at Burra was exhausted and mining activities moving elsewhere. James Hebbard was born in 1862 and the family recalls that James Hebbard walked to Broken Hill in 1884, just before the main lode was discovered there. During that year the initial mining leases were surveyed, silver chloride having been discovered in 1883.

James Hebbard became the inspector of mines at Broken Hill. He was appointed mine manager of the Central Mine in 1902, an appointment which appears to coincide with the construction of the substantial residence in Piper Street.

Hebbard wrote about the technical developments at the mine for the Australian Institute of Mining Engineers. His account of the evolution of the minerals separation process on the Central Mine is held in the National Library of Australia. Flotation was a technique used to separate the ore. Previously the ore could only be crushed and separated by weight, with much ore stockpiled, unable to be processed. Two patents were issued in 1902, both for developments in Broken Hill, which were combined to form the Potter-Delprat process. The idea for the process came from brewing. Bubbles were used to raise the ore. Sir Bruce Watson in his 1993 lecture, "Research and the Mining Industry", commented that 'miners have normally been very interested in the products of breweries but it is indeed unusual to have brewers interested in mining.'

Hebbard was associated with the further development of the technique of flotation. Much of research into the technique was by a subsidiary of the Sulphide Corporation that owned the Central Mine, the London-based Mineral Separation Company. The records of the research by the company survive, including machinery, the Staggered Spitz, or more simply Hebbard's Machine, developed by Hebbard. By 1912 eucalyptus oil was being used, allowing differential separation to occur (a particularly Australian solution). Prior to World War I substantial advances in mineral extraction occurred at Broken Hill.

According to Simon Molesworth, who nominated the building to the State Heritage Register: "It would seem that James Hebbard was responsible for the introduction of modern occupational health and safety reforms to the operations under his control at Broken Hill decades ahead of other companies in Broken Hill and throughout Australia. His reforms were most probably responsible for saving hundreds of lives and set a precedent which was eventually followed throughout industrial Australia.". Molesworth has additionally explained: "Hebberd was a highly significant individual - not just another mine manager. It appears that Hebberd can lay claim to being the father of modern occupational health and safety. . . Hebberd was probably responsible for saving the lives of hundreds of Broken Hill workers". He points out that Geoffrey Blainey's history of Broken Hill discusses Hebberd: 'James Hebberd [was] a former government inspector of mines, and his concerns for industrial hygiene made his company's magnetic mill the most advanced industrial plant in Australia. He allowed no men to work too long in the plant, transferring them to another job to reduce their exposure to the dry dust. He also introduced the revolutionary idea that every man in the plant should wear a respirator. He enforced the idea more than thirty years before any company on the field enforced the wearing of a hard hat underground. If the latter reform is any guide, he must have met strong opposition from many of the men he was trying to protect'

James Hebbard died in 1942. At least four generations of the Hebbard family were involved with the mining industry in NSW and South Australia. One of the ore dumps was called Mt Hebbard, reflecting the Hebbard family's connection with the mining industry in Broken Hill. However Mt Hebbard has now disappeared, retreated and used as fill in the mines.

=== The Central Mine Manager's Residence ===
The former Central Mine Manager's Residence is thought to have been constructed in 1902. It was one of the finest houses in Broken Hill and numerous visitors to the town were entertained there. Each mine manager had a substantial residence, which appears to have been located around the base of the Line of Lode, adjacent to each mine's leased area, although deliberately separated from the mine workings. The fact that the Central Mine Manager's Residence is not actually located on Hebbard Street is perhaps indicative that the street layout was undertaken after the construction of the residence. The North Mine Manager's Residence is still extant off Argent Street, and is listed by the National Trust.

The former Central Mine Managers Residence is a substantial single storey residence with a wrap-around veranda encircling three sides of the building. The rear elevation may originally have had a veranda also. The house was probably designed in Adelaide as it incorporates elements of the South Australian vernacular utilised in many of the masonry buildings in Broken Hill, particularly the use of red brick to the window surrounds forming quoins. By contrast the public buildings in Broken Hill tended to be designed in Sydney.

Unlike many contemporary gabled buildings designed for the outback the gables on the former Central Mine Manager's Residence do not appear to be vented. The walls are constructed of irregularly coursed stone with the joint lines picked out. The window heads are not visible in the photographs. The arch to the front door is composed of brick, with a moulded brick to the outer rim of the arch. The veranda posts and capitals are timbers, as is the valence, which is vaguely Japanese in character.

The house is a fine example of the use of the Federation Queen Anne style in Broken Hill, a trend noted within the architectural press during the 1890s. Sydney architectural critic de Libra referred to it as "London Queen Anne in the Salt Bush plains". The brick chimneys and the half timbering to the gables are both motifs drawn from the English vernacular. Although the veranda was used in Queen Anne Revival style buildings in England, particularly in coastal locations, the wrap around veranda is a distinctly Australian form. The house has a complex roof form, with stepped central gables and a bay to one elevation and a porch to the other, with its own gable roof with half timbering. The residence retains a two tone colour scheme, picking out the half timbering in brown (as was intended). The house retains its panelled front door, side lights and fanlights. Air conditioning units have been added below a number of openings. It has not been determined whether these openings were originally French doors to the veranda or windows. The oeuill-de-bouef window beside the main entrance also survives.

Simon Molesworth further emphasises the significance of the modifications to the Federation Queen Anne style to suit outback conditions: "(a) very deep and high verandas, once on all sides as distinct from verandas around just part of the house, (b) particularly steep pitching of the roof utilising corrugated iron (typical of Broken Hill) with guttering and roof drainage designed to cope with the extreme downpours of rain occasionally experienced in the Outback; (c) very large reception rooms with windows orientated to capture the flow of natural cool breezes; (d) exceptionally high ceilings to facilitate internal dispersal of warm temperatures; and (e) significantly large storage/pantry areas including a large cellar under the middle of the house.".

The former Central Mine Manager's Residence also has heritage significance for its social values. The Hebbards had three daughters and their residence was a social centre for the town where prominent visitors were entertained, and family events such as weddings took place. James Hebbard was involved with the local Wesleyan church and its choir. Hebbard family legend also tells that during the 1918 strike, James took thin steel rods down to the picket line, to be worked into knitting needles for the ladies who were knitting for the soldiers in Europe. The residence is also associated with voluntary work undertaken by the Hebbard women during World War 1.

=== St Anne's Home of Compassion ===
Closely following the closure of the Central Mine in 1940, the Central Mine Managers Residence was purchased by Roman Catholic Bishop Thomas Martin Fox for use by the Sisters of Compassion as an orphanage and convent. The residence became known as the St Anne's Home of Compassion Convent. Three cottages were also utilised to accommodate the children. The order continued to use the residence until 1984 when it became the administration centre for Southern Cross Homes. An archway bore the lettering St Anne's Home of Compassion Convent, in the style of open work lettering that often appeared above the entrance gates to walled Catholic Cemeteries.

An aboriginal community member writes: 'From the 1940s until ... at least 1970's it was called St Anne's Home of Compassion. St Anne's had a number of roles, as an orphanage, looking after chronically ill people, but the history I am familiar with comes from the family of my husband, a Paakantyi man from Wilcannia. ... The many girls that were stolen or as they say out here "drug away" from Wilcannia in this period were taken to St Anne's including my husbands sister. . .. Other aboriginal girls from Wilcannia were sent to St Anne's by their parents so they could get some education. A large number of the local community have ties with St Anne's, and many of our community leaders grew up here. As always they have mixed feelings about the home, but there are many good memories about the home. I feel it was very important because it was close to Wilcannia and the family was able to and encouraged to visit the girls. This allowed family ties and identity to be maintained, in contrast to kids that were sent to other homes such as Kinchela that were so far away.'

In 2006, along with the conversion of the site to a nursing home facility, the residence was converted into an administration block.

== Description ==
The former Central Mine Managers Residence is a substantial single storey residence with a wrap-around veranda encircling three sides of the building. The rear elevation may originally have had a veranda also. The house was probably designed in Adelaide as it incorporates elements of the South Australian vernacular utilised in many of the masonry buildings in Broken Hill, particularly the use of red brick to the window surrounds forming quoins. Unlike many contemporary gabled buildings designed for the outback the gables do not appear to be vented. The walls are constructed of irregularly coursed stone with the joint lines picked out. The window heads are not visible in the photographs. The arch to the front door is composed of brick, with a moulded brick to the outer rim of the arch. The veranda posts and capitals are timbers, as is the valence, which is vaguely Japanese in character.

The house is a fine example of the use of the Federation Queen Anne style in Broken Hill, a trend commented on in the architectural press during the 1890s. Sydney architectural critic de Libra referred to it as "London Queen Anne in the Salt Bush plains". The brick chimneys and the half timbering to the gables are both motifs drawn from the English vernacular. Although the veranda was used in Queen Anne Revival style buildings in England, particularly in coastal locations, the wrap around veranda is a distinctly Australian form. The house had a complex roof form, with stepped central gables and a bay to one elevation and a porch to the other, with its own gable roof with half timbering. The residence retains a two tone colour scheme, picking out the half timbering in brown (as was intended). Recent photographs show that the house retained its panelled front door, side lights and fanlights. Air conditioning units have been added below a number of openings. It has not been determined whether these openings were originally French doors to the veranda or windows. The oeuill-de-bouef window beside the main entrance also survives.

An archway including bearing the lettering St Anne's Home of Compassion Convent, in the style of open work lettering that often appears above the entrance gates to walled Catholic Cemeteries, such as in Portugal.

The southern side of the Line of Lode, particularly Eyre Street, has been described as

'The closest almost complete precinct of the mining scene as it existed at the beginning of the twentieth century. Commencing with the Broken Hill South Mine workings, the magnificent offices of the Broken Hill South adjoin the Central Power Station and its offices, followed by the mine workings of the Central Mine, including the former Assay Office of that mine.'

The former Central Mine Manager's Residence was deliberately separated from the mine workings, built within the residential areas that had developed to both the north and the south of the Line of Lode.

It is one of a series of substantial mine manager's residences built around the line of lode, a number of which survive. The residences were associated with the individual leases.

== Heritage listing ==
The former Central Mine Manager's Residence is of State significance for its aesthetic values as a 1903 "Federation Queen Anne" style residence where the design was modified to suit the intense heat of Broken Hill. The residence is part of the mining heritage precinct associated with the Broken Hill Line of Lode. The Former Central Mine Manager's Residence is of State significance also for its historical association with mine manager James Hebbard, whose innovations in the areas of mineral processing, ore separation and health and safety reforms were of widespread importance. The residence also has heritage significance for its social values. When in use by the Hebbard family, the residence was a social centre for the town where prominent visitors were entertained, and family events such as weddings took place. Then, from c. 1940 until c. 1984, the residence was the site of the St Anne's Home of Compassion, an orphanage operated by the Sisters of Compassion and home to many Aboriginal girls sent from all over NSW during that period.

Central Mine Manager's Residence was listed on the New South Wales State Heritage Register on 15 December 2006 having satisfied the following criteria.

The place is important in demonstrating the course, or pattern, of cultural or natural history in New South Wales.

The former Central Mine Manager's Residence is of State significance as part of the mining heritage precinct associated with the Broken Hill Line of Lode. As an intact, surviving example of the series of mine managers' residences erected near the mining leases in the early twentieth century, it provides evidence of a period of substantial growth and economic prosperity in Broken Hill. Because of the stark contrast it provides against the humble miners' cottages that characterise the majority of the building stock of Broken Hill, the Central Mine Manager's Residence is evidence of the class and income differences within the town in the early twentieth century. It is also likely to be of at least local significance for its historical use between c. 1940 until c. 1984 as the St Anne's Home of Compassion, an orphanage run by the Sisters of Compassion inhabited by many Aboriginal girls sent from all over NSW.

The place has a strong or special association with a person, or group of persons, of importance of cultural or natural history of New South Wales's history.

The former Central Mine Manager's Residence is of State significance for its historical association with mine manager James Hebbard, for whom it was built in 1903. Hebbard's research into new techniques of mineral processing and ore separation was important to the mining industry in Broken Hill. It has further been proposed that "James Hebbard was responsible for the introduction of modern occupational health and safety reforms . . . probably responsible for saving hundreds of lives and [which] set a precedent which was eventually followed throughout industrial Australia".

The style and size of the house reflects the wealth and status of a mine manager such as Hebbard. The relocation of the Hebbard family from the copper mines of Burra to the Victorian Goldfields to the silver mines of Broken Hill serves as a microcosm of the exhaustion of old mine deposits and the opening up of new ones in south-eastern Australia in the late nineteenth century. At least four generations of the family have been involved with the mining industry in NSW and in South Australia. The residence is also associated with voluntary work undertaken by the Hebbard women during World War 1.

Furthermore, the former Central Mine Manager's Residence is likely to be of State significance for its historical associations with the Aboriginal girls and Catholic nuns who lived there during its time as the "St Anne's Home of Compassion Convent" orphanage between c.1940 and c.1984.

The place is important in demonstrating aesthetic characteristics and/or a high degree of creative or technical achievement in New South Wales.

The former Central Mine Manager's Residence is of State significance for its aesthetic values as a substantial 1903 "Federation Queen Anne" style residence. While many Federation Queen Anne-styled residences present a veranda wrapped around one corner, the former Central Mine Manager's Residence suggests the design was modified to suit the intense heat of Broken Hill by the addition of a wrap around veranda encircling three sides of the building. The rear elevation may originally have had a veranda also. The Residence is also potentially of aesthetic significance for the observation that it was probably designed in Adelaide since it incorporates elements of the South Australian such as the use of red brick to the window surrounds forming quoins.

The place has strong or special association with a particular community or cultural group in New South Wales for social, cultural or spiritual reasons.

The former Central Mine Manager's Residence is of State significance for its social values. From c. 1940 until c. 1984, the residence was the site of the St Anne's Home of Compassion, an orphanage operated by the Sisters of Compassion. Aboriginal children from all over NSW were sent here during that period, and the residence may be of State significance for its both good and sad memories still held by many of these former residents. At a local level, the residence was a social centre for the town when inhabited by the Hebbard family, where prominent visitors were entertained, and family events such as weddings took place.

The place has potential to yield information that will contribute to an understanding of the cultural or natural history of New South Wales.

The former Central Mine Manager's Residence is of local significance as an early residence which contributes to the understanding of late-nineteenth century regional construction techniques and for illustrating the story of European settlement and class differentiation in the Broken Hill district. It also offers research potential for expanding upon the observation that its detailing follows South Australian architectural trends in contrast to most public buildings in Broken Hill, which tended to be designed in Sydney.

The place possesses uncommon, rare or endangered aspects of the cultural or natural history of New South Wales.

The former Central Mine Manager's Residence is of local significance for its rarity as a largely intact nineteenth century town house that provides a stark contrast with the numerous small miners' cottages that characterise the majority of the building stock of Broken Hill.

The place is important in demonstrating the principal characteristics of a class of cultural or natural places/environments in New South Wales.

The former Central Mine Manager's Residence is of State significance as a fine example of a substantial early twentieth century regional residence using good quality materials and projecting an imposing facade. It is of local significance as one of a series of mine managers residences that surrounded the mining leases operating on the Line of Lode.
