= James Hebbard =

Australian mining manager (1862–1941)

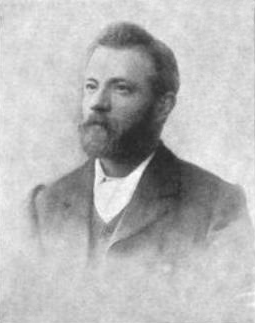
- In The Sketch, 24 September 1902
- Born: July 1862; Bendigo, Victoria
- Died: 29 November 1941 (aged 79); Adelaide, South Australia
- Education: Bendigo School of Mines
- Occupation: Mine manager
- Spouse: Olivia Pope (m. 1887)
- Children: 3

James Hebbard (July 1862 – 29 November 1941) was a miner who became manager of the Great Central Mine, Broken Hill.

== History ==
Hebbard was born in Bendigo, Victoria, in July 1862, the fourth son of Mary "Martha" Hebbard, née Kitto, (15 September 1827 – 12 December 1920?) and John Hebbard (c. 1823 – 20 August 1886), a Cornish miner, who married in England in 1847.

The Hebbards arrived in Australia around 1848 for employment at the great copper mine at Burra, South Australia. It was there that their sons William and John Henry and daughter Sarah Jane were born. Around 1855 they joined the exodus from South Australia to the Victorian goldfields, and spent some time at Fryer's Creek, near Castlemaine, then around 1861 settled at Bendigo.

Hubbard was educated at Kennedy's Collegiate School and the Bendigo School of Mines, then at age 16 began night work underground at the United Hustlers and Redan mines at Long Gully, Bendigo, taking his classes during the daytime. He also worked at Johnson's Reef Extended whose manager was Richard Pope, and whose daughter he later married.

In June 1884 Hebbard began work underground at the Hen and Chickens mine, Broken Hill, when the famous W. R. Wilson was manager. He had only been there a few weeks when Wilson recommended him to Crisp Brothers as manager of their Lubra mine at Purnamoota. Hebbard took the job and held it for six months.

In 1885 Hebbard returned to underground mining for the Broken Hill Proprietary Company under general manager William Jamieson and mine manager Sam Sleep and was soon promoted to underground foreman. Then at the end of 1885 he took a managerial position with the Britannia and Scotia Silver Mining Company; six months later he had returned to his post with BHP.

Early in 1886 Jamieson, Wilson, Sylvester Browne and some others founded the Broken Hill Junction Silver Mining Company, and in January 1887 appointed Hebbard mine manager.

In October 1888 he was appointed manager of Tom's Lewis Ponds Silver and Gold Mining Company at Lewis Ponds Creek, Orange, New South Wales.

In 1891 he accepted a Government job as Inspector of Mines, hailed by the press as a good appointment.

This was a stressful job. A disastrous mine collapse occurred in the South mine in July, 1895, when eight men were killed.

A catastrophic fire occurred at the Proprietary Block 11 mine that same year, when a great deal of effort had to be put in before the fire was extinguished and the mine made safe.

In 1901 he left the Public Service for the Sulphide Corporation's Central Broken Hill Mine as assistant general manager to C. F. Courtney, whom he succeeded in 1903, when Courtney became general manager of the Corporation in Australia. At some stage Hebbard moved into the Central Mine Manager's Residence on Piper Street, South Broken Hill, now on the New South Wales State Heritage Register.

The mine was periodically affected by "creeps" (ground movements) which resulted in destruction of the mill, threatened other buildings on the town side of the workings, and resulted in the death of at least one man. At great expense they rebuilt the mill, administration block, power house, and all other such facilities on the South Broken Hill side of the mine. The gamble paid off, as no further such losses occurred.

In 1902 the Central Mine was the first on The Barrier to exploit the new magnetic separation process for refining zinc ore. It worked sufficiently well to justify doubling their capacity, but was no help with "slimes", which remained an intractable problem. Courtney, while in England during 1903–04 sent out a model plant to demonstrate the Cattermole process of froth flotation, which promised to separate heavy ores from the lighter stuff.

In 1905-1908, Hebbard was manager of the Central Mine when he replaced the Cattermole process with the Minerals Separation's flotation process, the first industrial scale test of the froth flotation process. Minerals Separation, Limited in London discovered the process, and sent staff to Broken Hill to build the plant. Hebbard in an article published in the Proceedings of the Australasian Institute of Mining Engineers detailed the Sulphide Corporation's Central Mine plant and the evolution of the process, a revolutionary method of extracting metals from low grade, complex ores. The article was reprinted in 1915, after the process had been successfully introduced in United States and South American mines. Hebbard also improved the Minerals Separation machine, called a cell, as the Hebbard Subaeration cell, used throughout the world.

James Hebbard died in Adelaide on 29 November 1941.

== Other interests ==
He was a member of ...

- Australasian Institute of Mining Engineers and their president 1913
- American Institute of Mining Engineers
- Mining Managers' Association when BHP, Block 10, and British mines withdrew from negotiations with the unions
- Broken Hill Hospital board and its chairman for three or four years. He founded the Hospital Sunday entertainments for patients, based on a similar scheme then running in Bendigo. At his suggestion, surplus funds raised during Queen Victoria's jubilee were devoted to an ambulance for injured miners.

He was also ...

- a fine amateur musician, he conducted a 100-voice choir on the central reserve as a benefit for the hospital. He was associated with the Broken Hill Choral Society, and the choir of the Sulphide Street Wesleyan Methodist Church.
- a keen gardener.

== Family ==
James Hebbard married Olivia Pope ( – 5 July 1947) in December 1887; they had three daughters:

- Olive Mary Hebbard in 1915 married Arthur Lacey Court, a British born and educated mining engineer working for her father at the Sulphide Corporation works. They moved to San Francisco in 1917 to work for Minerals Separation, Ltd, but returned to Australia by 1925 residing at Fitzroy, Queensland, then Sydney.
- second daughter Beryl Maud Hebbard married Edward Stanley Whitehead on 9 April 1920, lived at Glen Iris, Victoria

- James Hebbard Whitehead

- Marjorie Helen Hebbard

They had a home at Beryl Street, Broken Hill, close to Bromide Street; later 29 Fisher street, Fullarton, South Australia

Family of John Hebbard and Mary Hebbard, née Kitto

- John Henry Hebbard (20 June 1849 – 7 October 1905) born in Burra, died in Bendigo married Sarah Matthews (c. 1854 – 8 December 1898) in 1872
- William Hebbard (1 September 1850 – 20 July 1901) married Janet Reid Jamieson in 1874
- Sarah Jane Hebbard (30 August 1852 – 1854) born in Adelaide, died in St Kilda, Victoria
- Mary Ann Hebbard (28 August 1856 – 17 October 1916) married William Kerby in 1876
- James Hebbard, the subject of this article
- Thomas Hebbard (1858 in Bendigo – 16 December 1945) married Elizabeth Jane Spargo (c. 1864 – 5 January 1946) of Kadina, South Australia on 22 January 1882, lived corner Piper and Central streets, South Broken Hill. They had five sons and three daughters including:

- Thomas Hebbard jun. married Margaret Jane Davies ( – May 1916), lived corner Comstock and Hebbard streets, South Broken Hill

- Francis Hebbard (1864 – ) married Louisa Day Hattersley in 1887
- Samuel Hebbard (1866 – 23 April 1936) married Martha Ann Gardner (died August 1954) in 1888, died at Caulfield, Victoria
- Amelia "Millie" Hebbard (1869 – 18 December 1894) married ?? 26 December 1890
