= William McWhirter =

- Born: c. 1851; Ayr
- Died: 6 March 1933 (aged 82); Clarkston, East Renfrewshire
- Education: Newton on Ayr Academy
- Spouse: Marian
- Engineering career
- Discipline: Electrical engineering
- Institutions: Institution of Electrical Engineers
- Significant advance: Voltmeter and ammeter

William McWhirter (c. 1851–1933) was a Scottish electrical engineer, grandfather of Norris McWhirter, who invented the combined voltmeter and ammeter, from which such (analogue) subsequent meters were developed.

== Early life ==
He was born in Ayr. He went to school at Ayr Academy.

== Career ==
He was apprenticed to his uncle who was a baker. He joined the telegraphic department of the Glasgow and South Western Railway, becoming a divisional inspector.

In 1882 he worked for Messrs Norman & Sons, setting up the first electrical lighting at Glasgow Central station. There were no power stations in Glasgow at the time, and under the arches of the railway viaduct on Argyle Street, a makeshift generator was built from a Robey boiler and engine, with dynamos with copper wire brushes. A nearby shop was also lit with electricity, by an arc lamp, and this new contraption drew large crowds.

In 1884 he formed McWhirter & Co, which opened a works in Govan. This site made big improvements to the efficiency and commutation of the dynamo. In 1897 he formed William McWhirter and Sons Ltd. He went to India in 1899 to improve the country's railway signalling.

=== Inventions ===
In 1883 he patented a combined voltmeter and ammeter, a prototype multimeter. It was later manufactured by the General Electric Company.

=== Institutions ===
In 1880 he joined the Institution of Electrical Engineers (now the Institution of Engineering and Technology). He was one of the founders of the Scottish Electrical Contractors' Association (now known as SELECT).

=== Research ===
In research he cooperated with Prof Silvanus P. Thompson, Prof William Edward Ayrton, Prof John Perry, Prof Andrew Jamieson, and the American Frank J. Sprague. He also worked with Hugo Hirst, 1st Baron Hirst.

== Personal life ==
He married Marian, from Ayr.

One of his sons would be William Allan McWhirter, born in 1889, who became the editor of the Sunday Pictorial (later to become the Sunday Mirror), and managing director from 1944-50 of Associated Newspapers. His grandsons were Norris McWhirter CBE and Ross McWhirter.
