= Wesley Uniting Church =

There are multiple articles on churches known as Wesley Uniting Church:

- Wesley Uniting Church, Broken Hill
- Wesley Uniting Church, Toowoomba
