= Wesley Uniting Church, Broken Hill =

Wesley Uniting Church
- Wesley Uniting Church and Hall Group; Wesleyan Uniting Church Group; Wesley Church and Wesley Hall
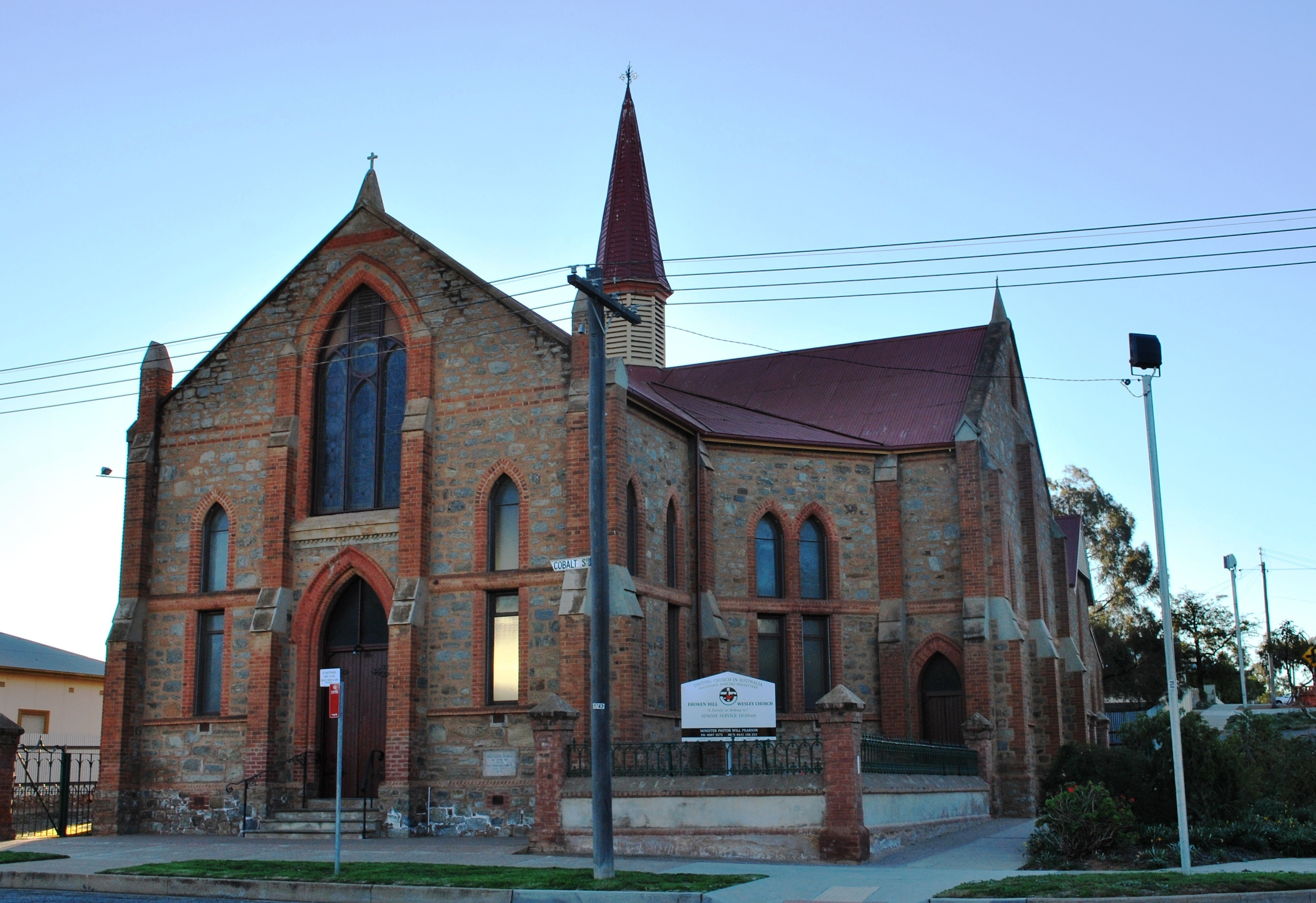
- Wesley Uniting Church, pictured in 2009

- Location in New South Wales
- 31°57′24″S 141°27′40″E
- Location: Cobalt Street, Broken Hill, City of Broken Hill, New South Wales
- Country: Australia
- Denomination: Uniting
- Previous denomination: Methodist
- Website: brokenhill.uca.org.au

History
- Status: Church
- Founded: 31 July 1888
- Founder: Mrs Charles Drew

Architecture
- Functional status: Active
- Architect: Frederick William Dancker
- Architectural type: Victorian Gothic Revival
- Years built: 1885–1888
- Completed: 9 December 1888

Specifications
- Length: 22 metres (72 ft)
- Width: 18 metres (59 ft)
- Height: 9 metres (30 ft)

New South Wales Heritage Register
- Official name: Wesley Uniting Church and Hall Group; Wesleyan Uniting Church Group; Wesley Church; Wesley Hall
- Type: State heritage (complex / group)
- Designated: 23 April 2010
- Reference no.: 1818
- Type: Church
- Category: Religion
- Builders: Messrs. Walter and Morris

Register of the National Estate
- Official name: Methodist Church Hall, Sulphide St, Broken Hill, NSW, Australia
- Type: Defunct register
- Designated: 1 November 1983
- Reference no.: 555
- Type: Historic

Wesley Uniting Church is a heritage-listed Uniting church at Cobalt Street, Broken Hill, City of Broken Hill, New South Wales, Australia. It was designed by Frederick William Dancker and built from 1885 to 1888 by Messrs. Walter and Morris. It is also known as Wesley Uniting Church and Hall Group, Wesleyan Uniting Church Group, Wesley Church and Wesley Hall. The property is owned by the Uniting Church in Australia. It was added to the New South Wales State Heritage Register on 23 April 2010 and on the (now defunct) Australian Register of the National Estate.

== History ==
=== Wiljakali (Wilyagali) land ===
There were some fifteen groups of Aboriginal people traditionally living in the huge area bisected by the Darling River in the western plains of NSW. The principal group around Broken Hill was the Wiljakali. Their occupation of the area is thought to have been intermittent due to the scarcity of water. The same scarcity of water made the area unattractive for European occupiers and traditional Aboriginal ways of life continued longer there than in many other parts of NSW, into the 1870s. As Aboriginal people were increasingly deprived of the full range of their traditional options, they were obliged to come into stations or missions in times of drought to avoid starvation. By the 1880s many Aboriginal people were working on stations or within the mining industry. Some people ended up living in reservations created under the Aborigines' Protection Act 1909. The influenza epidemic of 1919 had a further significant impact upon the indigenous population, as did the twentieth century federal government policy of removing Aboriginal children from their families.

=== Mining history in Broken Hill ===
The term Broken Hill was first used by the early British explorer Charles Sturt in his diaries during his search for an inland sea in 1844. Western plains towns far away from the major rivers, such as Broken Hill, owe their existence to the mineral discoveries made in the decade after 1875, when spectacular deposits of gold, silver, copper and opal were found. The township of Broken Hill was developed in the "Broken Hill Paddock" which was part of Mount Gipps Station. George McCulloch, the station manager employed many men; it was in 1883 that three of his workers pegged the first mineral lease on his property, they were Charles Rasp, David James and James Poole. The Syndicate of Seven was formed, and consisted of: George McCulloch, Charles Rasp, David James, James Poole, George Urquhart and George Lind. These men pegged out the remaining six mineral leases which are now known as the Line of Lode. It was the seventh member of the Syndicate, Philip Charley, who found the first amount of silver in 1885. A township was soon surveyed and Broken Hill was initially known as a shanty town with an entire suburb named "Canvas Town" for its temporary buildings.

This syndicate floated a company in 1883, the Broken Hill Proprietary Company, or BHP as it is known today and a township was soon surveyed. Broken Hill was initially a shanty town with an entire suburb named "Canvas Town" for its temporary buildings. The streets in the centre of the town were named after minerals, Argent (i.e. Silver) and Chloride being important cross streets. The living and working conditions of the miners were harsh, largely due to the climatic extremes of the outback. Photographs of the township of Broken Hill and the mining activities were exhibited in London at the 1908 Franco-British exhibition.

=== Wesleyan Church and Hall ===
The Church was designed by architect Frederick William Dancker of Adelaide and it has the capacity to accommodate 880 people. The building contractors were Walter & Morris of Adelaide and Broken Hill. The Foundation stone was laid for the Wesleyan Church on the corner of Sulphide and Cobalt Streets, Broken Hill on 31 July 1888. Those involved in the laying ceremony were Mrs Charles Drew, who laid the foundations stone, Rev. S. Rossiter and Rev. A. S. J. Fry. Mr Hebbard, secretary to the trustees, placed a glass jar with documents pertaining to the building underneath the foundation stone.

A little more than four months later, on 9 December 1888, the Rev. James Haslam, Chairman of the South Australian Methodist Conference, officially opened the church. The building measuring 22 by 18 metres (72 by 59 ft) had a ceiling height of 9 metres (30 ft) and a spire 18 metres (59 ft) high. The original design had provision for a gallery, however, the seating capacity at the time of building was already 600 people. In October 1889 the large stone lecture hall behind the Wesleyan Church was officially opened. The total cost of the church and hall was A£6,000, including the buildings, church furnishings and vestments.

The first Willyama High School commenced instruction in the Wesleyan Hall and continued there for five years. In 1895-6 the hall was used as the first primary school while the Burke Ward school was being built.

During the 1920s the short gallery fronting the choir loft in the church was removed along with pews in the body of the church to allow for the choir to be held in the body of the church.

In 1963 for its 75th anniversary, the church had works done at a cost of A£1,200. This included installation of a wooden cross 4 metres (13 ft) in length. It is assumed that at this time the choir loft was bricked in to make the place where the new cross was hung.

In June 1981 regular worship services at Wesley Uniting Church were ceased.

From November 1986 to December 1987 some restorations were carried out on the buildings. These included the removal of the bricked in archway to expose the original choir loft. These works were designed to bring the group back as close as possible with the original layout of the buildings.

In 1988 the interior of the Wesleyan Church Hall featured in a commercial in which the famous artist of Broken Hill, Pro Hart, slapped food onto a carpet to create a painting of a dragonfly (which in the narrative of the commercial was successfully wiped off by a cleaning lady). This has been described as "one of the most popular TV commercials ever made in Australia" (Groves). A slap of blue paint remains on the exterior brick work of the hall near its entrance to Sulphide Street.

Although on 31 July 1988, on the anniversary of its centenary, the Wesley Uniting Church was rededicated, by 20 August 1995 the last Wesleyan service was held there. Two months later, in October 1996, worship at the Broken Hill Uniting Church was transferred to the church, which was renamed the "Wesleyan Uniting Church". The church and its hall remains in religious use by the Uniting Church.

== Description ==
The Wesleyan Uniting Church Group consists of the Wesley Hall and Wesley Church. With the church's founding stone laid in 1888, the group is historically important for its close connection with Broken Hill's early history, dating only from the commencement of mining operations by BHP in 1885. The church and its hall are built in rough hewn stone with brick trim. Located on a corner site near the centre of town, the group is a key streetscape element and local landmark.

The Wesley Church is designed in a Victorian Gothic Revival style based on a symmetrical cruciform plan modified to form an octagon in the centre. This central structure is supported internally on four trefoil iron columns with foliate columns at the crossing. The walls are built of local rough hewn stone with brick trim, in this case brick buttresses and brick surrounds to openings. There is a string course running across the walls at middle height. In keeping with the Gothic style the church has parapetted gables and its windows have pointed arch heads. The roof is clad with corrugated iron. A feature of the building is a slender, octagonal spire with ventilated shaft. Internal walls are plastered and the ceiling is timber boarded.

The Wesley Hall's design incorporates simple Gothic forms and also some Romanesque influence. Like the adjacent church it is constructed of rough hewn stone with brick trim; the trim is in the form of brick quoins and brick surrounds to doors and windows. There is a central gabled section flanked by a skillion roofed section to either side. The roof is clad with corrugated iron, as are the gable apex and the vertical roof steps between the gable roof and the skillions. On the main facade there are two doors with flanking windows to their outer sides, together with a central window placed higher on the gabled wall. All these openings are of the pointed arch type. The side walls have rounded arch windows, and above these are four paned clerestory windows. Internally, posts with curved brackets support the gabled section of the roof. The internal side of the roof is lined with timber. There is a modest, recent extension housing a kitchen at the rear of the hall.

There is a stone, brick and iron fence along part of the street frontage to Cobalt and Sulphide Streets and a church sign. A narrow block of land beside the church on Cobalt Street was recently purchased, allowing space for a driveway to the rear of the property.

The church was reported to be in good physical condition as at 11 August 2004.

== Heritage listing ==
Dating from 1888, just three years after the founding of Broken Hill as a mining settlement in 1885, the Wesley Uniting Church and Hall Group is of State significance for its associations with the pioneering days of Broken Hill. It demonstrates the early appearance of Methodism and provides evidence of the strong temperance movement of the late nineteenth century in contrast with the town's "reputation for boisterousness, heavy drinking [and] militant unionism". The Wesley Church is also of State aesthetic significance for its austere and intact Victorian Gothic design, being built of rough hewn stone with a tall central spire, a key streetscape element and local landmark.

Wesley Uniting Church was listed on the New South Wales State Heritage Register on 23 April 2010 having satisfied the following criteria.

The place is important in demonstrating the course, or pattern, of cultural or natural history in New South Wales.

The Wesley Uniting Church and Hall are of State significance as some of the earliest church buildings to be constructed west of the Darling River. Dating from 1888, just three years after mining operations commenced on the "broken hill" or Line of Lode in Broken Hill, the site is closely associated with the early history of this major mining centre. It provides evidence of the strong temperance movement of the late nineteenth century, which contrasted with the town's "reputation for boisterousness, heavy drinking [and] militant unionism"

The place has a strong or special association with a person, or group of persons, of importance of cultural or natural history of New South Wales's history.

The presence of the Wesley Uniting Church and Hall is of local significance for demonstrating the early and substantial appearance of Methodism in Broken Hill within three years of the commencement of mining operations in 1885. Methodism may be associated with the large numbers of Cornish miners attracted to the town from South Australia and other mining areas in the Barrier Ranges.

The place is important in demonstrating aesthetic characteristics and/or a high degree of creative or technical achievement in New South Wales.

The Wesley Church and Wesley Hall are of State aesthetic significance for their Victorian Gothic design, built of rough hewn stone with brick trim, a form of construction more commonly found in the arid localities of South Australia than in NSW. The slender octagonal spire and distinctive stonework help make this a key streetscape element and local landmark, situated opposite the town's main recreational park.

The place has strong or special association with a particular community or cultural group in New South Wales for social, cultural or spiritual reasons.

Wesley Uniting Church Group is of local social significance to the people of Broken Hill as the seat of Methodism in the Barrier region and secondly a venue for many social activities. The Church Group has been a part of the broader community of Broken Hill and remains today a functioning church. The hall is of social significance to people who fondly remember the Pro Hart carpet commercial of 1988, which was filmed inside.

The place has potential to yield information that will contribute to an understanding of the cultural or natural history of New South Wales.

Wesley Uniting Church Group is of local significance for its research potential to demonstrate the techniques of stone and brick walling and for its complexity of design and structure with the vernacular materials used.

The place possesses uncommon, rare or endangered aspects of the cultural or natural history of New South Wales.

Wesley Uniting Church Group is of State significance for its rarity as one of the earliest groups of church buildings to be erected west of the Darling River, dating from 1888, and for the rarity of its construction materials featuring rough hewn stone with brick trim.

The place is important in demonstrating the principal characteristics of a class of cultural or natural places/environments in New South Wales.

Wesley Uniting Church Group is of State significance for its representative qualities as a pioneering church in the far west of New South Wales.

== See also ==
- List of Uniting churches in New South Wales
