= Samuel Trail =

Scottish minister

Samuel Trail (1806–1887) was a Scottish minister who served as Moderator of the General Assembly of the Church of Scotland in 1874.

== Life ==
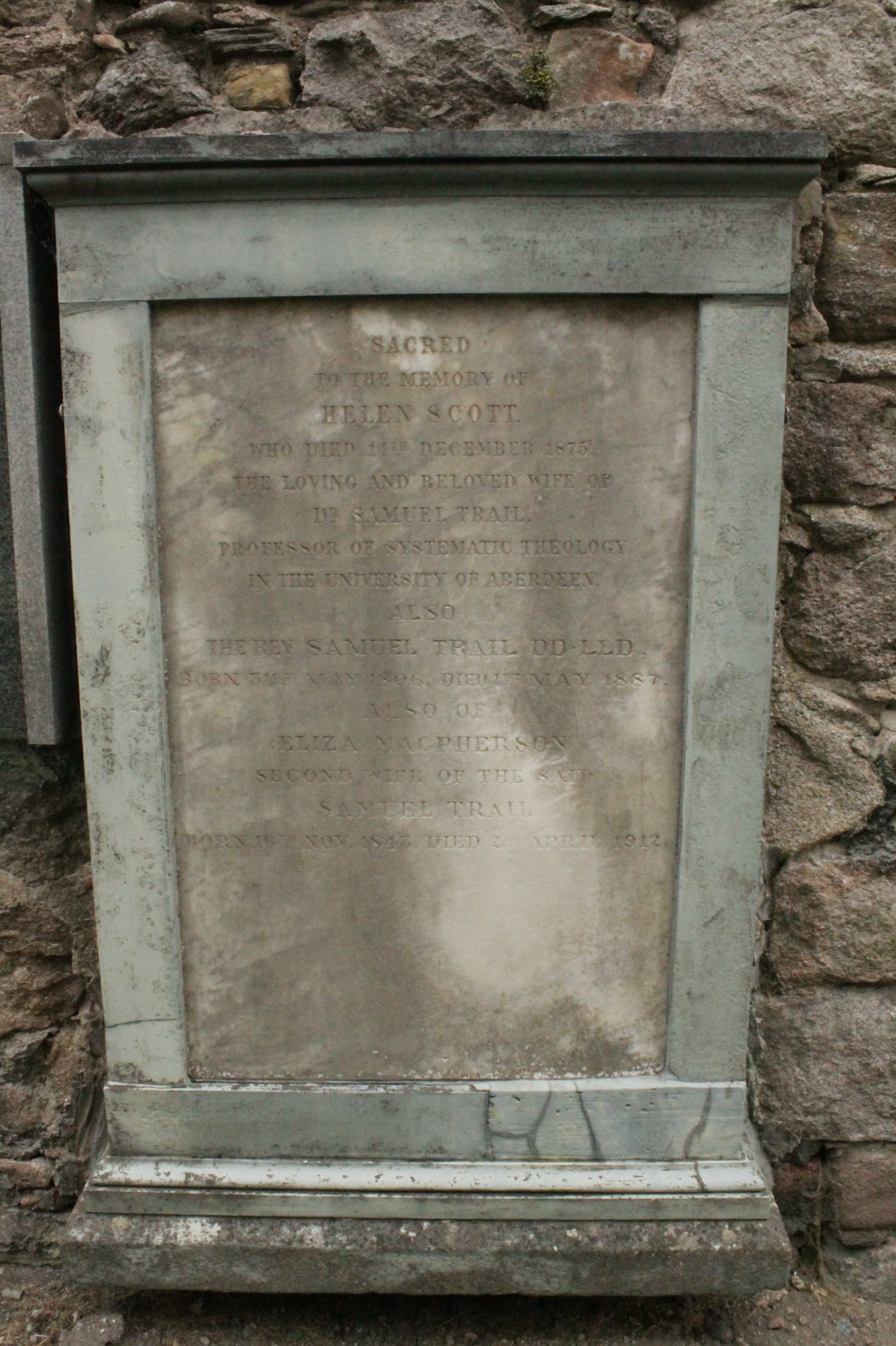
The grave of Rev Samuel Trail, St Machar's Cathedral

He was born in the parish of Udny on 31 May 1806, the son of John T. Trail, a farmer.

He studied divinity at Kings College, Aberdeen University, graduating MA in 1825. He then spent some years as the private tutor to the children of the Viscount of Arbuthnott. In 1841 he was appointed minister of Arbuthnott Church and stayed in this role until 1844, when he was translated to Birsay church in Orkney. He lived there until 1868.

In 1847 he was granted an honorary doctorate by King's College (LLD) and in 1852 was additionally created a Doctor of Divinity (DD). In 1868 he was appointed Professor of Systematic Theology at the newly amalgamated Aberdeen University. He also served as provost of Old Aberdeen. He lived at the Divinity Manse at the university.

He died on 1 May 1887. He is buried against the outer east wall of St Machar's Cathedral in Old Aberdeen.

== Family ==
In 1841 he married Helen Scott, youngest daughter of Rev James Scott of Benholm in Kincardineshire.

His daughter Isabella Anne Trail married the civil engineer Andrew Jamieson FRSE. His sons included John Arbuthnott Trail WS LLD (1847-1920) and Prof James William Helenus Trail FRS.

Following the death of his first wife, in 1882 he married Eliza Macpherson (1843-1912), daughter of Rev Prof James Macpherson DD. She was 39 and he was 76.
