= Grange, Moray =

Coordinates: 57.5479°N 2.8273°W

Grange
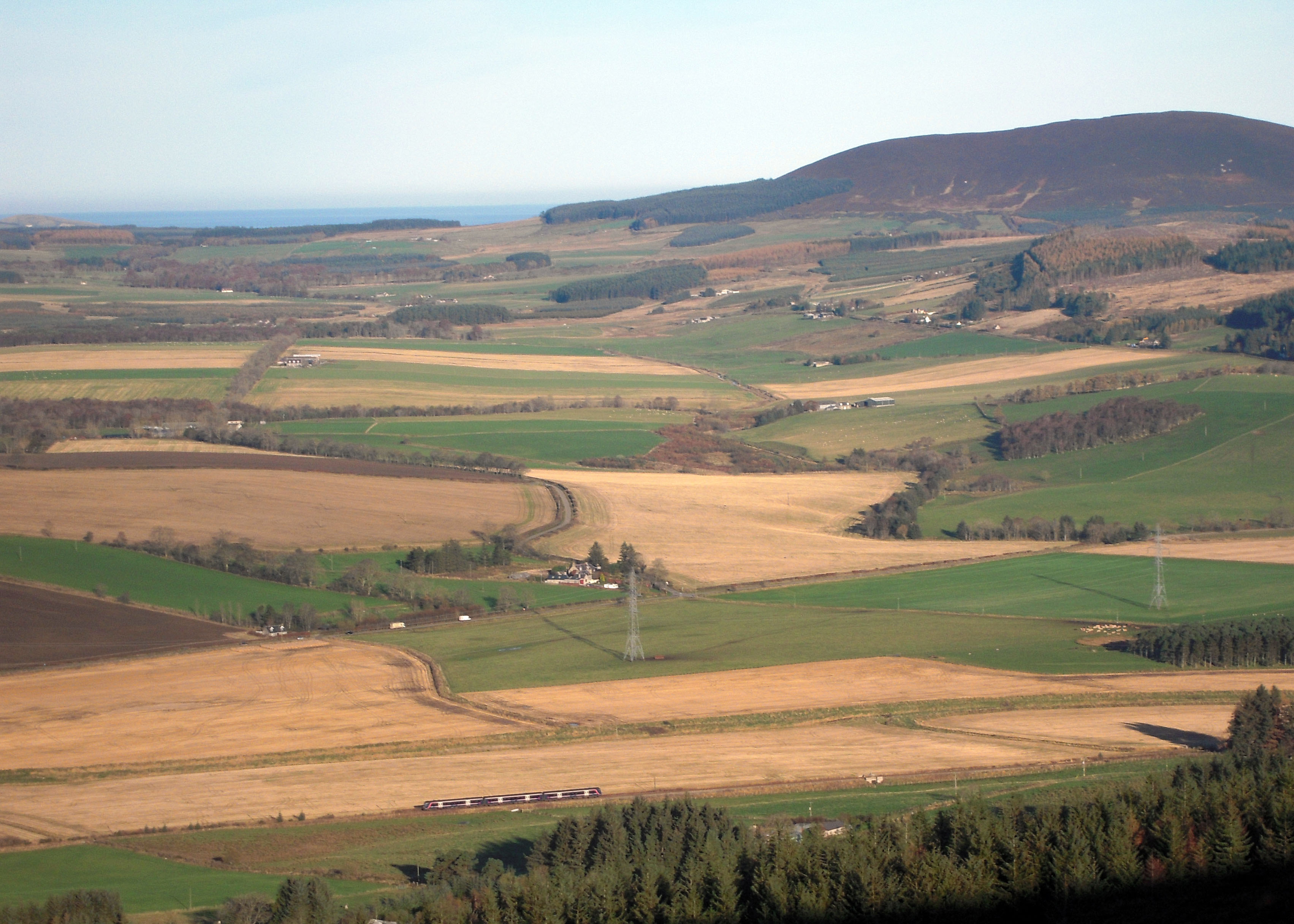
- A view north over Grange from the top of the Balloch Hill.

- Location within Moray
- Population: 723 (Census 1991)
- Council area: Moray
- Lieutenancy area: Banffshire
- Country: Scotland
- Sovereign state: United Kingdom
- Post town: Keith
- Postcode district: AB55
- Dialling code: 01542
- Police: Scotland
- Fire: Scottish
- Ambulance: Scottish
- UK Parliament: Moray
- Scottish Parliament: Moray

Grange is a parish in the Scottish county of Banffshire that dates back to a royal charter granting the lands to the abbots and monks of Kinloss in 1196. Although there is no settlement within that area so named, it still retains its distinct community character with its own parish church and primary school. The only concentrated collection of dwellings is the small hamlet of Knock near its eastern border that is nestled beneath the hill of the same name that, though no higher than 430 metres, dominates both it and all the agrarian haughs that extend from the Grampians to the coastal plains. The total area is 6,089 Hectares (15,048 Acres). From north to south it stretches for 9.5 km (6 miles) and from east to west it spans 8 km (5 miles) making it almost square. The population in 1991 was 723, a slight increase from the previous census after gradual decline.

The word Grange is a middle age or low Latin derivative of grangia, a word meaning farm or country.

One of the oldest domestic buildings in the north east of Scotland is in Grange. It is called Mains of Edingight and was built in 1559.

In 1996, the community celebrated its 800 years and a book was commissioned to document its history and was written by Andrew Smith.

== Famous residents ==
- James Ferguson, an astronomer and inventor, was born at a place called Core of Mayen.
- Prof Andrew Jamieson FRSE (1849-1912) civil engineer and author
- George Jamieson CMG, (1843-1920), British Consul-General in Shanghai was born in Crannoch, Grange (Crannoch is now part of Keith, Moray)
- Jimmy Sinclair, born here and later became a teacher, politician and businessman in North Vancouver. Also maternal grandfather of Justin Trudeau, 23rd Prime Minister of Canada.

=== Books ===
- Forrest, Isa (1920). Islaside Musings. Banffshire Journal.
- Cramond, William (1898). The Church of Grange.
- Seton, Mike (1987). Keith & Area Past & Present. Moray District Libraries. ISBN 0951193139.
- Records of the Monastery of Kinloss.
- The Highland Regiments.
- Statistical Account of Scotland 1791 - 1799.
- Cramond, William (1895). The Parish of Grange.
- The Book of the Chronicles.
- Barclay, William (1925). The Schools and School Masters of Banffshire. Educational Institute of Scotland.
- Cunnison, James (1961). Hamilton, Henry (ed.). Third Statistical Account of Banff. Vol. 10. Collins.
- Stone Circles in Scotland - a Report.
