= William Jamieson (mining) =

Australian surveyor

William Jamieson (18 August 1852 – 8 May 1926) was an Australian surveyor, and a member of the syndicate that founded the BHP mine at Broken Hill. He was, in 1884, the company's first mine manager and, in 1885, its first general manager.

== History ==
Jamieson was born in Aberdeen, Scotland, in 1853, as the second son of Rev. George Jamieson of the Church of Scotland, and his wife, Jane Jamieson née Wallace. He was educated in Aberdeen and as an apprentice arrived in Adelaide in 1869, then headed for the Victorian goldfields, where he had little luck, and so headed for Sydney.

Armed with a letter of introduction to (later Sir) John Hay, a friend of his father's, and a wealthy squatter for whom the town of Hay is named, he was sent by Hay to Grungle station, located 400 miles up the Murrumbidgee River from Hay. He worked, for a time, as a jackaroo at the sheep station, until George Mair, manager of the station, induced him to give up jackarooing, and study surveying. In 1881, he entered the New South Wales Lands Department as a surveyor and, in March 1883, while in Bourke, he received his license as a surveyor under the Real Property Act. That same year, he was put in charge of the Bourke-Silverton district, which included the Barrier Ranges.

In 1884, he was sent to complete the long-awaited survey of mining claims at Silverton. Shortly after his arrival, a long drought– which had dispirited many prospective miners –broke, and threatened many with flooding.

Jamieson fell in with the Syndicate of Seven prospectors and investors led by George McCulloch, and the discoverer Charles Rasp (who, on 5 September 1883, had pegged out a lease of some 20 acres of scrub-covered country, later known as Block 12), and named themselves the Broken Hill Mining Company (later, BHP), the other five members of which were: George Urquhart, G. A. M. Lind, Phillip Charley, David James and his mate, James Poole. McCulloch pegged out another claim, later designated No. 13. The others claimed one apiece, and the syndicate had Blocks 12 to 15, later 10 to 17; the claims stretched over two miles in length. The seven shares were parlayed into fourteen. Lind was the first to bow out of the company, selling his shares to Rasp and McCulloch, and Urquhart left a year later. Jamieson purchased three shares for £320. He shortly divested himself of two, one of which became the property of William Wilson.

Subsequently, Jamieson was approached by one Thomas Low, who had stumbled on an outcrop of silver ore some distance away from where the prospectors had been working, and offered to show him its location, if he could buy into the syndicate. As it could take a considerable time to re-discover the outcrop in such a large area of scrubby country, Jamieson agreed. The number of shares issued had only recently doubled again, and Low received one of these shares.

William Wilson, manager of the Barrier Ranges Silver Mining Association, bought into the association a few months later, as did Bowes Kelly, in 1884, paying £150 for a twenty-eighth share, and Harvey Patterson, in 1885, paid £1800 for a twenty-eighth share; within ten years, those shares were each worth £1.5 million.

Until Jamieson became a shareholder, McCulloch had always "called the shots" in the operation of the mine; Jamieson gained the respect of the other shareholders and, when the company moved, in 1885, to register as a Proprietary Limited, Jamieson was elected managing director, at a salary of £500 per annum, and resigned from the public service. He resigned as managing director the following year, to be replaced by engineer Samuel Wilson. In 1895, Jamieson was elected to the board.

He died in his sleep at his home "Clarence", Queen's Road, Melbourne, after seven months' illness.

== Affiliations ==
- Jamieson's house was the first to be built in Broken Hill.
- He served as a director of the Barrier Ranges and Broken Hill Water Supply Company and foundation chairman in 1888
- He was a director of the Mount Lyell Mining & Railway Company, Emu Bay Railway Company and the Zinc Producers' Association.
- A keen golfer, he was a member of the Royal Melbourne Golf Club, Sandringham, Victoria.
- He was also an active member of the Victoria Racing Club.

== Family ==
Jamieson married Helene Mathilde "Lily" Meyer (c. 1864 – 4 April 1948) of Brisbane on 17 July 1890 in London. They had one son:

- Colin Jamieson (30 April 1891 – ) born in Salisbury, England He married Margery Wood ( – ) on 15 December 1926. Their children included:

- Judith Jamieson ( – )
- Mary Jamieson ( – )
- William "Bill" Jamieson ( – )

They had a residence "Redholme" on St Kilda Road.

Andrew Jamieson (1849–1912), Scottish engineer and Matthew Jamieson (1860 – 17 August 1895), engineer, were his brothers.
