= M. B. Jamieson =

Mathew (often Matthew) Buchan Jamieson (16 May 1860 – 17 August 1895), was a Scottish-born engineer in Australia, closely identified with the young town of Broken Hill, New South Wales.

== History ==
Jamieson was born in Aberdeen, Scotland, the fourth son of Rev. George Jamieson of the Church of Scotland and his wife Jane Jamieson, née Wallace. He was educated at Chanonry House School and at Aberdeen University, and in November 1874, not yet aged 15, was apprenticed to Matthew Boulton, Aberdeen City Engineer, and in 1879 was appointed his assistant, a post he held for five years.

In September 1883 he was, on the recommendation of Sir Robert Rawlinson, appointed Assistant Engineer in the Public Works Department of British Guiana, where much land had been reclaimed from the sea by dykes from when the country was a Dutch colony. Three years later he became Chief Assistant Engineer. He was of assistance to engineer William Russell, the "Sugar King of Demerara".

William Russell (13 March 1827 – 28 March 1888) made several improvements to the process of sugarcane crushing, and was also largely responsible for establishing the East Demerara Water Conservancy, a water supply system for Georgetown, British Guiana. Russell Memorial Square, a triangular plot of land in front of the Stabroek Market, Georgetown, was named for him. The site featured a publicly funded bust of Russell. Russell Street in Georgetown was not named for him but for Lord John Russell, the English Prime Minister.

Life in the tropics was deleterious to Jamieson's health, and in 1888 he retired from British Guiana's public service and sailed to Melbourne, Australia, where he set up in private practice at 39 Queen Street.

His brother William Jamieson was by this time established as a mine manager in Broken Hill, New South Wales, and had co-founded the Broken Hill Water Supply Limited. No doubt influenced by his brother, Jamieson turned his focus to the mining industry, which had a great need for qualified engineers, and he was soon involved in the design and oversight of crushing, concentrating and smelting plants. Around this time he became a director of the Lewis Ponds Gold and Silver Mining Company Limited Round Hill Silver Mining Company, Soudan Silver Mining Company, Pioneer Silver and Lead Mining Company, Limited, and others.

Water supply to Broken Hill was always a vexed issue. When the local catchment was depleted, water was brought in by rail from Hutton's Lagoon, 12,000 gallons at a time, to be snapped up within days. In 1890 Jamieson and George Gordon founded the Broken Hill Water Supply Company, Limited, with plans to dam Stephens Creek, and pipe it in to "The Barrier". The scheme was moderately successful, and taken over by Broken Hill Proprietary around 1900.

== Publications ==
Presented before the Institute of Civil Engineers:

- The Internal Corrosion of Cast-iron Pipes (1881), for which Jamieson was awarded a Miller prize
- Mining and Ore-Treatment at Broken Hill, N.S.W. (May 1893), for which he was awarded a Telford medal

== Family ==
Jamieson was a brother of Andrew Jamieson, engineer and academic, and William Jamieson, mine manager of Broken Hill.

Jamieson married Christian "Christina" Hall (3 January 1864 – 1943) at Chalmer's Church, Adelaide, on 11 November 1890. Christina was the youngest daughter of the William Hall, ship builder of Aberdeen. They had a home, "Tuena", on Malvern Road, Malvern, Victoria. They had three children.

- William George Jamieson (18 July 1891 – )
- Douglas Jamieson (11 January 1893 – )
- Catherine Wallace Jamieson (16 June 1894 – )

He suffered chronic ill-health the last years of his life, and died in Corryong, New South Wales, after taking a deliberate overdose of chloral hydrate. His wife and family returned to Aberdeen, Scotland, where Christian, at least, died.
