= Brokenhillite =

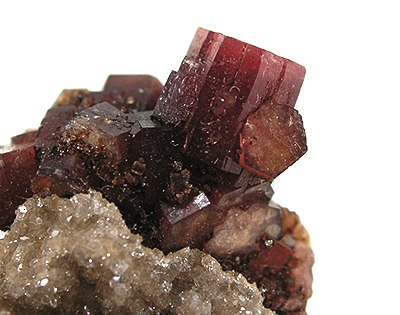
- Brokenhillite

General
- Category: Mineralogy
- Formula: (Mn^{+2}, Fe^{+2})_{8}Si_{6}O_{15}(OH,Cl)_{10}
- Dana classification: Inosilicate
- Crystal system: Hexagonal

Identification
- Formula mass: 4300 g
- Color: Brown, red, maroon
- Twinning: N/A
- Cleavage: Good
- Fracture: N/A
- Mohs scale hardness: 4-5
- Streak: Reddish brown

Brokenhillite is a rare mineral that is only found in the far-western regions of New South Wales in Broken Hill, Australia. Although it has been given a name and chemical formula, it has not been approved by the International Mineralogical Association primarily because it is a manganese silicate of the pyrosmalite group which means the compositional similarities are too great to be an approved mineral. Brokenhillite structure is either composed of iron or manganese with the formula (Mn^{+2},Fe^{+2})_{8}Si_{6}O_{15}(OH,Cl)_{10}. The actual components inside brokenhillite can be determined using a diffractometer. The structural basis of this mineral is determined to be phyllosilicate within the pyrosmalites due to the octahedral structure, with one perfect cleavage, a hardness of about 4.5, and a streak of light brown.

== Structure ==
Brokenhillite is a solid solution substitution between the end-member elements manganese and iron. The tetrahedral silicates are inosilicates with octahedral dispersal around the islands bonding with oxygen ions. The manganpyrosmalite counterpart has ring silicates forming as 6-fold and bond by manganese-oxygen between the sheets. Ultimately, brokenhillite has broken up disordered stacking due to the inosilicate structure.

== Composition ==
Brokenhillite is mainly manganese dominant with the chemical composition of Mn_{8}Si_{6}O_{15}(OH,Cl)_{10}. Chemically identical to manganpyrosmalite or ferric pyrosmalite, it is thus difficult to distinguish properly. When chloride is present and abundant in the composition it has the potential to become a halide.

== Special characteristic ==
Brokenhillite is found in Broken Hill, New South Wales, Australia in a mine with a wide variety of other minerals present. The hexagonal shape and brown color make it distinguishable especially when a phenomenon called pleochroism occurs when light shines through and it becomes translucent white or yellow. The American Mineralogical Association does not approve its classification as a mineral.
