= Walter Sully Emporium =

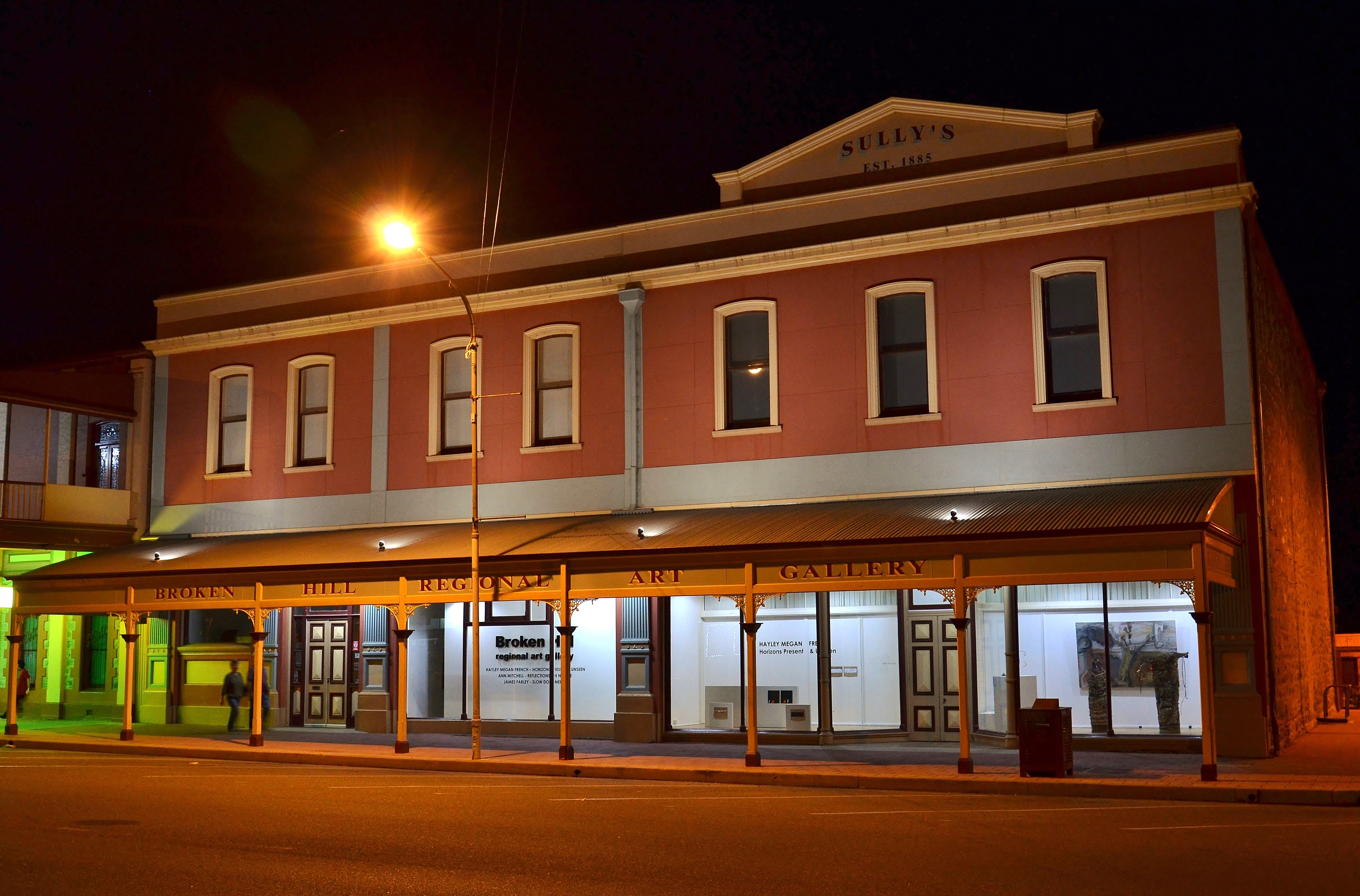
- Broken Hill Regional Art Gallery in the Walter Sully Emporium building

- Location within New South Wales Location within Australia
- 31.9562°S 141.4682°E
- Location: 404–408 Argent Street, Broken Hill, City of Broken Hill, New South Wales, Australia

History
- Built: 1885–1900

Site notes
- Owner: Broken Hill City Council

New South Wales Heritage Register
- Official name: Walter Sully Emporium; Walter Sully & Co. Pty Ltd
- Type: state heritage (built)
- Designated: 2 April 1999
- Reference no.: 690
- Type: Commercial Office/Building
- Category: Commercial

Walter Sully Emporium is a heritage-listed commercial building at 404–408 Argent Street, Broken Hill, City of Broken Hill, New South Wales, Australia. It was built from 1885 to 1900. It is also known as Walter Sully & Co. Pty Ltd. It today houses the Broken Hill Regional Art Gallery. The property is owned by Broken Hill City Council. It was added to the New South Wales State Heritage Register on 2 April 1999.

== History ==
Walter Sully established his first store in Silverton in 1882. In 1885 he moved to Broken Hill and erected a two-storey stone building with an arched, galvanised iron roof. This was used as the first post office in Broken Hill, commencing operation on 1 November 1886. An adjoining building was erected some years later in two separate parts – an office and a grocery store. This may have been around 1900. The office was reputedly in the centre building.

On 29 November 1907 Walter Sully & Co. Pty Ltd was formed as a limited company with Walter Sully as chairman, H. B. Sweetapple as managing director and five other directors. In 1924 Sully died in England and Sweetapple became managing director. Sweetapple held this position until 1971 when Mr K. Hammond became managing director.

Sullys provided all the heavy machinery and equipment for the development and exploration of Broken Hill's mineral field: explosives, candles, timber, metal machinery, general hardware, paints, tractors and liquor. The firm had its own livery stables and blacksmith at the rear of the buildings.

Sully's Emporium ceased business in 1985, by which time it was the longest-serving commercial business in Broken Hill.

In 1998, the building was purchased by the Broken Hill City Council as a new home for the Broken Hill Regional Art Gallery. It subsequently underwent a heritage refurbishment under architect Elizabeth Vines, preserving many heritage features and winning a number of heritage awards. Following the completion of the renovations, the gallery relocated to the emporium building in October 2004.

== Description ==
The Walter Sully Emporium is situated on the north-west side of Argent Street, adjoining The Silver City Working Men's Club. The ground is flat and without any substantial vegetation. The ground is partially covered by bitumen.

The building is a two-storey stone structure with a cellar covering the rear sections of the building. The first stage (1885) comprises the double fronted shop with staircase to the overhead gallery and to the cellar. The second stage (c.1900) comprises two shops with a cellar underneath.

The walls were originally exposed stone with red brick quoining and parapet detailing. Later, probably during the building of the c. 1900 extension, the facade was unified with render detailing and a veranda erected to unify the front elevation. The shopfronts are timber, the original design copied in the extension.

Between 1939 and 1957 all the facade detailing was removed and has been replaced with cement render. Pilasters (built c. 1900) divide the shopfronts with quasi-corinthian capitals and a new verandah has been added. The verandah has a timber framed roof of shallow convex shape, steel posts of two sizes and a concealed gutter behind the fascia hoarding.

The building roof is galvanised iron. The roof to the original building is a shallow barrel shape with small steel bow truss supports. The roof to the later section comprises two gables concealed behind the shop parapet with a central box gutter and ending in two hips with roof ventilators at the north end.

Corrugated iron outbuildings, a brick explosive store, underground tank and underground well are also located on the site.

The building was reported as being in poor physical condition at the time of its heritage listing, prior to the renovations by Broken Hill City Council.

== Heritage listing ==
The emporium was the longest surviving commercial business in Broken Hill until its closure and was instrumental in the development and exploration of the mineral field. It forms part of an important Argent Street streetscape.

Walter Sully Emporium was listed on the New South Wales State Heritage Register on 2 April 1999 having satisfied the following criteria.

The place is important in demonstrating the course, or pattern, of cultural or natural history in New South Wales.

It is the earliest surviving commercial business in Broken Hill until its closure in 1985 and was associated with two well known Broken Hill families, the Sullys (1885–1924) and the Sweetaples (1924–1985). The business provided all the heavy machinery and equipment for the development and exploration of Broken Hill's mineral field.

The place is important in demonstrating aesthetic characteristics and/or a high degree of creative or technical achievement in New South Wales.

The emporium is a strong element in the Argent Street streetscape. Erected in two stages, the two storey buildings are notable, despite defacement of the facade by removal of original facade mouldings and the single storey verandah. It forms an integral part of the streetscape. (vines 1987: 4)

The place has potential to yield information that will contribute to an understanding of the cultural or natural history of New South Wales.

The interior survives in original condition, retaining early office furniture and timber store shelving. The upper residence floors retain early finishes which, although in poor condition, provide a catalogue of decorative finishes utilised in Broken Hill from c.1900 – c.1940.
