= Andrew Jamieson =

Scottish engineer and academic author

Professor Andrew Jamieson FRSE
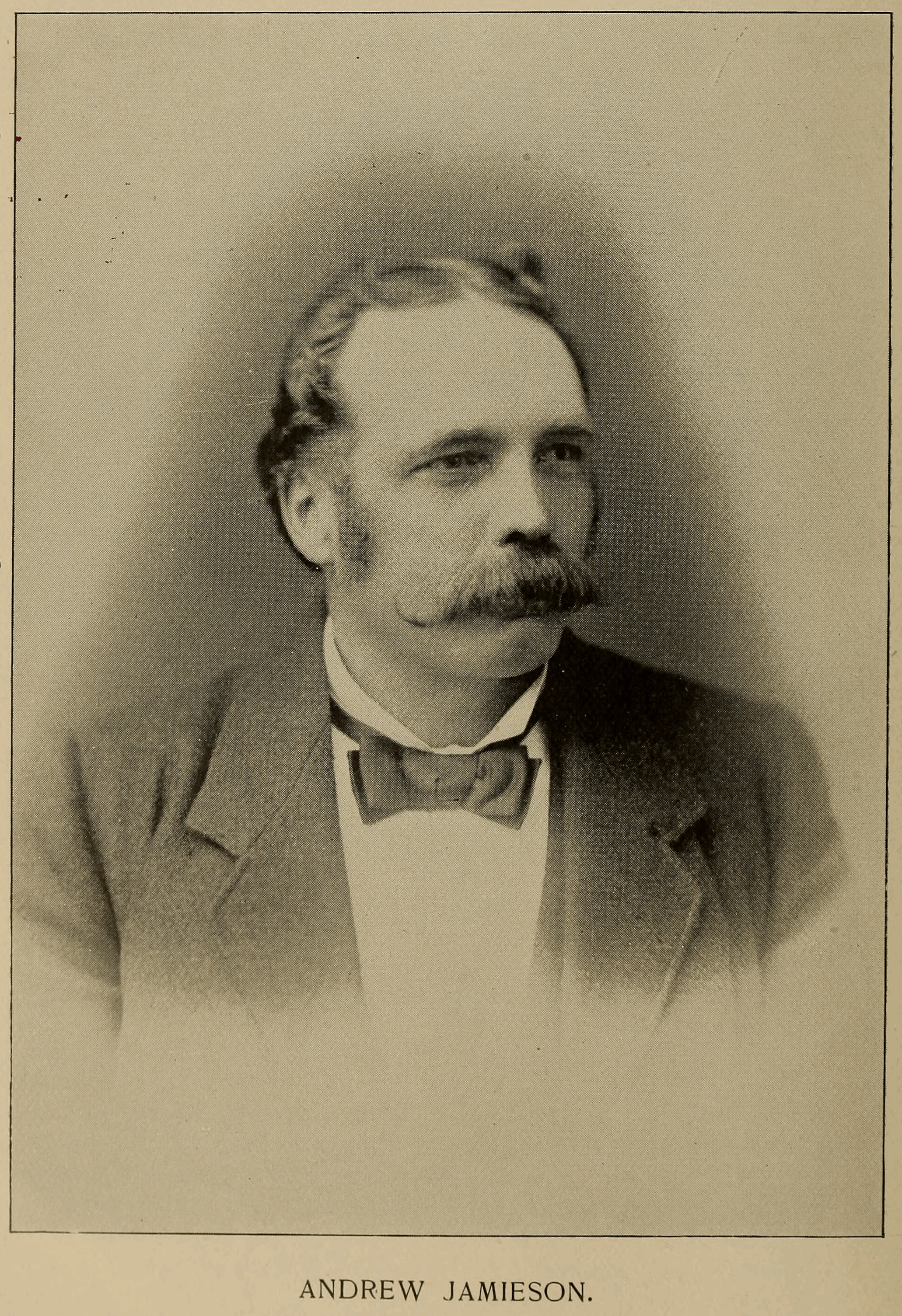
- Andrew Jamieson was portrayed in the September 1893 issue of Cassier's Magazine
- Born: October 1849; Grange, Banffshire
- Died: 4 December 1912 (aged 63)
- Education: Aberdeen University
- Parents: George Jamieson DD (father); Jane Wallace (mother)

Andrew Jamieson (1849–1912) was a Scottish engineer and academic author.

== Life ==
He was born in October 1849 in Grange in Banffshire in northern Scotland the son of Rev George Jamieson DD, minister of St Machar's Cathedral, and his wife, Jane Wallace. He went to school at the Gymnasium in Old Aberdeen. He was apprenticed to Hall, Russell & Company, shipbuilders in Aberdeen, around 1864, at its foundation. He then studied Mathematics and Engineering at Aberdeen University.

From 1880 to 1882 he was President of the Institute of Engineers and Shipbuilders in Scotland (IESIS). From 1880 to 1887 he was Principal of the Glasgow College of Science and Arts. At this time he lived at 38 Bath Street in Glasgow. In 1887 he accepted the role of Professor of Engineering at the West of Scotland Technical College.

In 1882 he was elected a Fellow of the Royal Society of Edinburgh. His proposers were William Thomson, Lord Kelvin, Fleeming Jenkin, John Gray McKendrick, and George Chrystal.

In 1902 he was the consultant engineer on the electrification of Glasgow tramways.

He died at 16 Rosslyn Terrace in Glasgow on 4 December 1912.

== Publications ==
- Electrical Rules and Tables for the use of Electricians and Engineers (1894)
- A Textbook on Steam and steam Engines Twelfth Edition contains questions for the 1897 Examinations in "Steam" which was held post printing of book. (1897)
- Elementary Manual on Applied Mechanics (1902)
- A Textbook of Applied Mechanics and Mechanical Engineering (1903)

== Family ==
He married Isabella Anne Trail, daughter of Very Rev Prof Samuel Trail.

He was the elder brother of William Jamieson (1853–1926), mine manager, and Mathew Buchan Jamieson (1860–1895), civil engineer, both closely identified with the young town of Broken Hill, New South Wales.
