= Syndicate of Seven =

Original members of the Broken Hill Mining Company (1883)

The Syndicate of Seven is the name given to the original members of the Broken Hill Mining Company formed in 1883, who lodged applications for mining leases along the Line of Lode at Broken Hill in New South Wales, Australia.

== History ==
The members, who all worked at Mount Gipps sheep station, which encompassed the Broken Hill, were:-

1. Charles Rasp (1846–1907) – a boundary rider, who was interested in prospecting, recognised that the site was highly mineralized (though suspecting black tin oxide — perhaps cassiterite) and on 5 September 1883 persuaded David James and his offsider James Poole to help him peg out 40 acres (16 ha) and registered their claim with mining warden Richard O'Connell.
2. David James (1854–1926) – a contractor employed to sink dams and mend fences.
3. James Poole (1848–1924) – worked with David James
4. George McCulloch (1848–1907) – manager of Mount Gipps station, recommended widening the syndicate in order to control the greater part of the hill, proposed seven shares at £70 (several thousand dollars in today's money) each.
5. Philip Charley (1863–1937) – a young man learning to be a sheep farmer, employed as a boundary rider.
6. George Urquhart (1845–1915) – a bookkeeper and overseer
7. George A. M. Lind (1861–1941) – a storekeeper.

Philip Charley in 1887

In September 1883 they pegged seven 40-acre (160,000 m^{2}) blocks (blocks No 10–16) along the exposed lode at Broken Hill, thus securing almost the whole of the easily worked ore (Curtis, 1908).

The initial assay results were not encouraging and Lind sold his share to Rasp and McCulloch, probably intimidated by the prospect of calls to finance further drilling. Poole and Urquhart sold their shares a year later, before the boom days and flotation of Broken Hill Proprietary in 1885 (Curtis, 1908 and Camilleri, 2006). James sold half his share to Sidney Kidman (Note: Kidman recounted exchanging six cattle for half of his share (and shortly selling it at a small profit) but no mention of D. James's half share) who went on to become a wealthy cattle baron and landowner.

== Later ==
The seven shares were parlayed into fourteen. William Jamieson purchased three of these shares for £320, and on 25 April 1885 was offered management of the mine at a salary of £500 per annum. He shortly divested himself of two, one of which was purchased by W. R. Wilson; George Doolette also purchased one of the 14 shares. Other important early investors were Harvey Patterson, Duncan McBryde and Bowes Kelly.
