= Mount Gipps Station =

Pastoral lease in New South Wales

Coordinates: 31.625°S 141.558°E

Location in New South Wales

Mount Gipps Station, most commonly known as Mount Gipps, is a pastoral lease in north west New South Wales. Today it operates as a working sheep station as well as a farmstay tourist location. It is situated about 37 kilometres (23 mi) north of Broken Hill and 173 kilometres (107 mi) north east of Mannahill in the outback of New South Wales.

Limestone Station and Nine Mile Station are on land formerly part of the original Mount Gipps Station. The old station homestead is the site of the Broken Hill Royal Flying Doctor Service.

== History ==
The station was established around 1863 by the Barrier Ranges Company, which included George Urquhart, the owner of the neighbouring Kinchega Station. The property takes its name from Mount Gibbs, named by Charles Sturt during his expedition of 1844. The original Indigenous name for Mount Gipps is Coonbaralba. Mount Gipps was the first established station in the Barrier Range area and one of the first west of the Darling River.

The run was taken up in 1866 by McCredie and Cunningham, who occupied an area of 1,400 square miles (3,626 km^{2}) including an outstation at Stephens Creek; the pair later sold it to James McCulloch and Robert Sellar. James McCulloch's cousin, George McCulloch, later became manager and was given a 2/16 share in the Mount Gipps Pastoral and Mineral Company; amongst his employees was a young Sidney Kidman, who was employed at Mount Gipps as a roustabout and bullock driver.

By 1877 the property encompassed about 540,000 acres (218,530 ha) and supported a flock of 71,000 sheep.

In 1883 a boundary rider from Mount Gipps named Charles Rasp discovered outcrops of mineralization on the property at Broken Hill in the Barrier Range, and with two fellow workers, pegged a claim, then at McCulloch's instigation formed the Syndicate of Seven to peg out a further six claims on what turned out to be one of the world's richest lodes of silver, lead and zinc, forming BHP.

== Location and description ==
Mount Gipps is situated about 37 kilometres (23 mi) north of Broken Hill and 173 kilometres (107 mi) north east of Mannahill in the outback of New South Wales.

The area is arid and most water is pumped from bores, though Stephens Creek runs through the property and has semi-permanent water-holes. The property is composed of gibber plains, large areas of saltbush and mulga and sandy creek beds surrounded by coolibah trees.

Limestone and Nine Mile Stations are subdivisions of the original Mount Gipps Station.

In the 2010s, the property was described as covering 85,000 acres (34,398 ha), and still operating as a sheep station but also as a farmstay for tourists. As of 2024 the property continues to operate as both a working sheep station and, with the neighbouring Wendalpa Station, covers around 100,000 ha (250,000 acres) and is known as the Mt Gipps Station Stay.

The old station homestead is now the site of the Broken Hill Royal Flying Doctor Service.

== See also ==
- List of ranches and stations
