= Boundary rider =

Australasian term for a cattle or sheep station employee

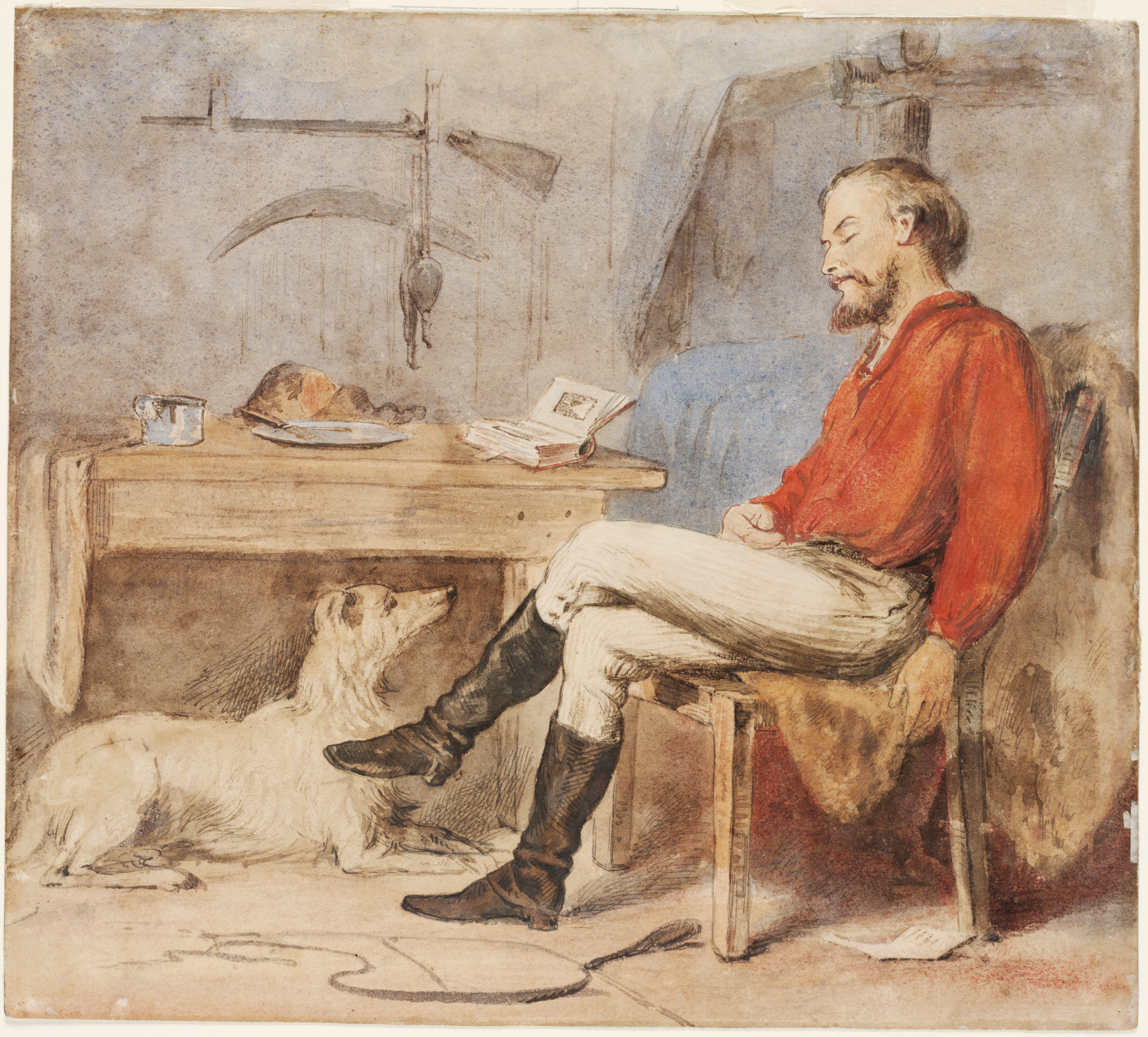
S.T. Gill, "Boundary rider", mid 19th century (State Library of New South Wales)

Boundary rider is a long-established (1864) Australasian term for a cattle or sheep station employee whose duties entail a regular tour (by horse, camel or motor vehicle) of the outer perimeter (boundary) of the property, checking condition of fences, collecting stock that may have escaped and ejecting strays that may have wandered onto the property, effecting any repairs that may be required, and reporting anything out of the ordinary to the owner or manager. On larger properties, semi-permanent shelters (boundary rider's huts) may be provided for overnight accommodation, with riders generally carrying their own swags.

== Sporting ==
In modern parlance, boundary rider is a term used in the Australian Football League as well as other field sports to denote a commentator who works from the sidelines of the field or 'boundary'.

The role of the boundary rider is to have access to the players and coaching/medical staff on the interchange bench, enabling them to provide more detailed commentary on current game conditions as well as any injury concerns for the competing teams. They often also have the responsibility of interviewing players and coaching/medical staff during breaks in the games (quarter-/half-/three-quarter time) as well interviewing a players or coaches of the match upon completion.

=== Notable boundary riders ===
- Christi Malthouse, Network Ten (2002–)
- Peter Larkins, Triple M (1997–), Nine Network (2001–)
- Robert Dipierdomenico
- Neil Kerley, Seven Network (1990s)

=== Cricket ===
In cricket, a boundary rider can be an outfielder or other person at the boundary of the field.
