= Charles Rasp =

Charles Rasp

Charles Rasp, born Hieronymous Salvator Lopez von Pereira, (7 October 1846 – 22 May 1907) is known as the first person to identify the economic potential of the ore deposits at Broken Hill, New South Wales, Australia.

He was born at Stuttgart, Duchy of Württemberg, where he was educated and he was trained in chemistry. He emigrated to Australia to improve his health in 1869 and worked at a variety of jobs on rural stations, eventually ending up at the Mount Gipps Station managed by George McCulloch, where he was employed as a boundary rider.

== Biography ==
Inspired by the silver rush to nearby Silverton, he began to prospect in the area of Broken Hill.

One day while mustering sheep in the Broken Hill paddock towards the end of September 1883, he was struck by the mineral appearance and formation of the 'Broken Hill'. He joined forces with local contractors David James and James Poole, and they took out a mining lease on part of Broken Hill and sank a small shaft. Though discouraged by early assay results, they persisted and soon after were joined by four others (all working on Mount Gipps) forming the Syndicate of Seven. George McCulloch and Charles Rasp pegged out further leases which took in the whole of Broken Hill, the original name of which was said to be Wilyu-Wilyu-yong.

They were prospecting for tin, but early assay results found only low grade lead ore and traces of silver (Curtis, 1908). It was not until late 1884 or early 1885 that rich quantities of silver were found and BHP was floated to mine the leases. Rasp received an allocation of shares and, within five years, he was rich.

Rasp moved to Adelaide, married and dabbled in mining interests until his death in 1907.
