= 1915 Picnic Train Attack and White Rocks Reserve =

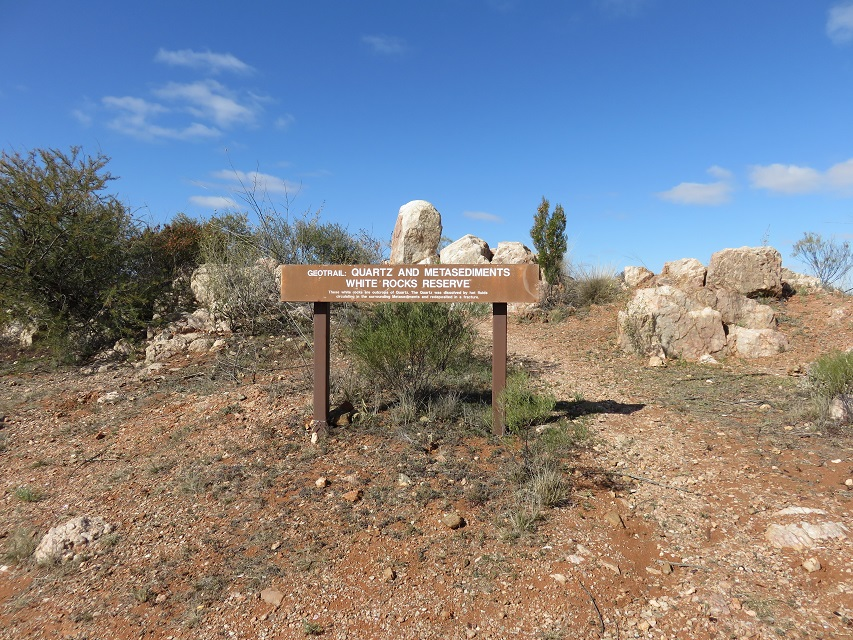
- White Rocks Reserve

- Location within New South Wales Location within Australia
- 31.9601°S 141.4264°E
- Location: Hynes Street, Broken Hill, City of Broken Hill, New South Wales, Australia

History
- Built: 1915–1915

Site notes
- Owner: NSW Department of Industry - Lands; Silverlea Services

New South Wales Heritage Register
- Official name: 1915 Picnic Train Attack and White Rocks Reserve; The Battle of Broken Hill
- Type: state heritage (landscape)
- Designated: 29 June 2018
- Reference no.: 2002
- Type: Other - Landscape - Cultural
- Category: Landscape - Cultural

1915 Picnic Train Attack and White Rocks Reserve is a heritage-listed former tramway and now visitor attraction at Hynes Street, Broken Hill, City of Broken Hill, New South Wales, Australia. It was the site of the only attack during World War I that occurred on Australian soil (The Battle of Broken Hill). The property is owned by NSW Department of Industry - Lands (State Government) and Silverlea Services (Community Group). It was added to the New South Wales State Heritage Register on 29 June 2018.

== History ==
Broken Hill is in the country of the Wilyakali people, who spoke a dialect of the Barkandji language. In 1915 most Aboriginal people in the region were living on stations that were known to be safe refuges such as Poolamacca, 60 kilometres north of Broken Hill.

The Wiljakali people who occupied the area when Charles Sturt arrived in 1845 (and first referred to it as 'broken hill') faced less immediate settler aggression than tribal groups who lived on the rivers, including the Darling River.

In 1883, when boundary rider Charles Rasp formed a small syndicate to mine a great ironstone outcrop in the far west of New South Wales, they thought they would find tin. Instead, they ended up having leases over some of the world's richest silver, lead and zinc deposits. Unlike gold, these metals were not simply there for the taking. BHP (Broken Hill Proprietary Ltd.), formed in 1885, faced technical and logistical challenges in mining and processing the ore bodies.

Broken Hill grew quickly. A population of 17,000 in 1889 had more than doubled to 35,000 in 1914, putting it on the map as the then third-largest city in New South wales. It was also Australia's most multicultural city of the time.

Trade unions quickly formed around the mine and extraction processing industries. The Trades Hall, built between 1891 and 1905, became the first building in Australia owned by unions, who also purchased the local newspaper "The Barrier Times" in 1908. This strong union tradition permeated all aspects of life in Broken Hill. The city's unionists won a 35-hour week in 1920, the first to do so in Australia.

The city is full of surprises, including the Broken Hill mosque, founded by Afghan cameleers in the early 1890s, and a synagogue built in 1910. The cameleers flourished in the later decades of the 19th century, transporting wool as well as construction materials for the Overland Telegraph line from Darwin to Port Augusta. The Jewish population mainly came from Eastern Europe. While the Broken Hill synagogue closed in 1962, the mosque is still used for worship. BHP ceased operations in Broken Hill in the late 1930s, by which time other mining companies had formed, leaving behind an open-cut mine that writer George Farwell described in 1948 as:

"forlorn as a dead planet. It has the air of a crater on the moon... Massive boulders and abandoned machinery sprawl down its flanks as though flung down the sheer sides of a mountain gorge. Upon the crest old iron lies everywhere".

=== Mullah Abdullah (1855-1915) ===
Mullah Abdullah was born in 1854-5 possibly in Afghanistan or in a nearby region of Pakistan. It is said that he came from a family of mullahs and that he was a mullah in Broken Hill. However, despite being widely reported, there is no substantial evidence he did, or could have, acted in that role.

Abdullah arrived in South Australia in around 1890 and started working in Broken Hill from 1899. It is unclear what he had been doing in Australia leading up to his move to Broken Hill but most likely he had spent time working as a cameleer. During his time working in Broken Hill it is suggested that he worked as a cameleer and it is documented that he worked as Mullah to the "Afghans at the local Ghantown" where he led the daily prayers, officiated at funerals and was also a halal butcher, killing animals according to the principles of halal for Muslim consumption. According to newspaper reports the halal butchery is part of the reason for Abdullah's role in the picnic train attack. Leading up to the day of the attack Abdullah had been prosecuted twice by Cornelius Brosnan the Sanitary Inspector for killing meat in an unsanitary environment.

=== Gool Badasha Mahomed ===
Gool Badasha Mahomed was born in 1875 near the North-West Frontier of India in the Tirah region of Afghanistan, an area that operated under local tribal law. Gool was an Afridi tribesman who spoke Pushtu came to Australia in his youth to most likely work as a cameleer before returning home to enlist in the Turkish Army. Gool fought in four campaigns before he returned to Australia in 1912 to continue as a cameleer until the decline of the camel transport business. He then worked in the silver mines of Broken Hill until he was retrenched and became self-employed pushing a cart around selling ice creams to the locals. The beginning of World War I sparked spiritual and patriotic feelings in Gool, and with the anger Abdullah felt towards Cornelius Brosnan the pair discussed their grievances and planned their attack on the train.

=== The attack ===
The only documented World War I assault to take place in Australia happened in Broken Hill on New Year's Day 1915. The Silverton Tramway Company lent its service to the Manchester Unity Order of Oddfellows to transport them out to Silverton for their annual celebration of 1 January. The 1200 members of men, women and children were seated in forty one open ore carriages that had been modified with temporary bench seating.

Both of the men were known to some of the passengers, especially Gool Mahomed as he made a living pushing an ice-cream cart has become a representation of the attack as this is where they had mounted the Ottoman flag and is how the two men were able to transport their rifles and ammunition to the site without being noticed.

The first shots fired were aimed at the engine of the train missing the crew in the cabin. One bullet landed hitting the sand beside the track and a second bullet hit the bottom of the brake van.

It was at this stop that injured passengers were removed from the train to wait for medical assistance to arrive; Mary Kavanhagh shot in the head, George Stokes shot in shoulder and chest, Lucy Shaw shot in elbow and Rose Crabb shot through the shoulder. There is no found record to say that any of these people had succumbed to their injuries so it is assumed that they survived.

Mullah Abdullah and Gool Mahomed had fled the scene on foot heading in a north east direction where they knocked on the door of a house near the Allendale Hotel on the corner of Jones and Morgan Streets to seek refuge. Some words were exchanged between the two men and the resident, 70 year old Thomas Campbell, which resulted in one of the men firing a shot at Campbell with the bullet passing through the side of his abdomen (Campbell survived). By this time the police had arrived and Abdullah and Mahomed ran off heading in the direction of their cameleer's camp and as they neared the Cable Hotel the two men came under fire from mounted Constable Robert Mills. Shots were exchanged between both parties and Constable Mills was injured, taking two bullets, one to the thigh and one in his groin. The police were forced to pull back and continue their pursuit from a distance enabling the two men time to take cover at a rocky outcrop of white quartz (White Rocks). Military men from the local base along with men from the rifle club joined in the combat. Police Inspector James Miller and Lieutenant Richard Resch were now present and gave instructions, an unrelenting tirade of bullets were fired at the two men who were hiding behind the rocks with both men returning fire. Civilian James Craig who was in his backyard at the time quickly became a victim during the conflict when a "stray" bullet hit him in his abdomen from 500 yards away. Mr Craig was treated by a doctor on site and was later transported to the local hospital where he died hours later as a result of his wound.

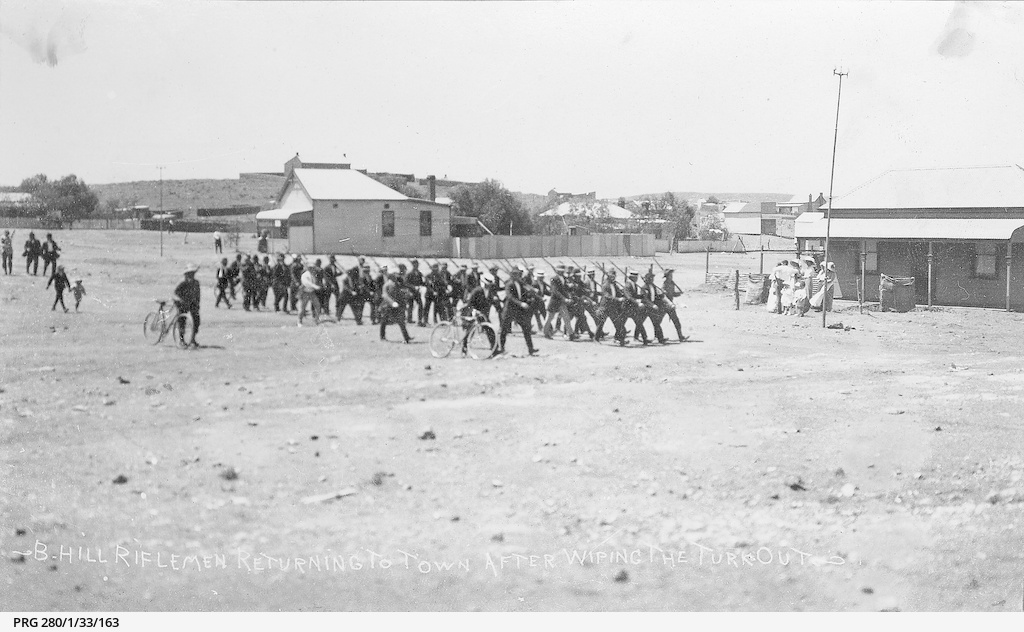
Riflemen returning to town after "wiping the Turks out"

Reinforcements arrived rushing toward the white rocks and the bombardment continued with the legion unwavering, not allowing the attackers to get away. About 1.00pm Abdullah and Mahomed were found lying on the ground, both men with multiple gunshot wounds. Mullah Abdullah had died some time during the fight and Gool Mahomed was still alive and was taken to the hospital but died a few hours after.

A suicide note that had been signed by Gool Badsha Mahomed was later found and translated to read:

"In the name of God, all Merciful, and of Mahommed His prophet. This poor sinner is a subject of the Sultan. My name is Good Badsha Mahomed, Afghan Afridi. In the reign of Abdul Hamid Sultan, I have visited his kingdom four times for the purpose of fighting. I hold the Sultan's order, duly signed and sealed by him. It is in my waistbelt now, and if it is not destroyed by cannon shot or rifle bullets, you will find it on me. I must kill your men and give my life for my faith by order of the Sultan. I have no enmity against anyone; nor have I consulted with anyone, nor informed anyone. We bid all the faithful farewell. Signed by Gool Badsha Mahomed, Afridi."

It is documented that three notes were found after the attack, one note was a letter from Gool written to the Minister of War in Istanbul offering to re-enlist. The other two notes were suicide notes from Mullah Abdulla and Gool Mahomed, however only the suicide note from Good Mahomed was found during research. It is claimed that in days leading up to the attack a cameleer by the name of Khan Bahader attended the Broken Hill north police station to report that Gool Mahomed and Mullah Abdulla were planning an attack. However, because Khan was unable to give accurate details of the intended ambush the report was not investigated by police.

=== The German Club ===
The union of Germany with the Ottoman Empire during World War I raised suspicions within the people of Broken Hill. People began to believe that the German community had been politically motivated and therefore conspired with Abdulla and Mahomed to attack the picnic train. They became a target for the already angry mob when at approximately 8pm a crowd gathered in Argent Street where accusations of the German involvement had been spat out in anger before the crowd made their way down to the German Club. Gathering at the front of the club the mob threw stones at the building and set it alight. When the fire brigade arrived to put out the fire the angry mob cut their hoses rendering them inoperable, leaving the club to burn to the ground. The outraged assemblage of citizens then moved on to Ghan Town, where many camel drivers lived, on the edge of town with the intention of attacking the innocent residents. Luckily the police and military were aware of their intentions and were able to stop the mob before any confrontation could occur.

The punishment of German citizens did not end with their social establishment being destroyed. When the German men arrived for work the next day they were all fired from the mines of Broken Hill. This was in response to the Australian Government passing the War Precautions Act 1914 (in August of that year). This gave the Australian Government a power outside of the realms of the Australian Constitution. During war time and up to six months after war the government could utilise this Act allowing them to make decisions on matters that could influence Australia's position in the war. One of the controls this endorsed was the detention of people either born in or associated to an enemy country without having to stand trial for an offence.

The effect of the war on Australian soil was wide spread with the introduction of the War Precautions Act 1914 deeming any migrant person as an "enemy alien" and a threat to the nation. These people were sent to live in internment camps until the end of the war in November 1918.

=== Cameleer history ===
Over 20,000 camels were brought to Australia from 1850 to 1900 from different parts of the world. The cameleers came from different countries such as Kashmir, Rajasthan, Egypt, Persia, Turkey, Punjab, Baluchistan, Afghanistan, India and Pakistan. They were known as "Afghans", although very few were actually from Afghanistan.

=== The mosque ===
Broken Hill was an active centre for camel trails and stock routes in the far west region of New South Wales where they linked up with the rail transport, it was an area with a population of "Afghans" big enough that there were two separate camps of shanty-type dwellings.

The camp located in north Broken Hill was known as Ghan Town. This is where the first mosque to be built in New South Wales was constructed in 1887, offering a site of prayer for those of the Muslim faith.

The west camp had a smaller mosque located on the corner of Kaolin and Brown Streets, but this mosque was relocated to the north camp in 1903 when the area in the west was redeveloped for housing.

The north camp mosque, which is now listed on the State Heritage Register, is still used for prayers and is a small museum showing memorabilia of cameleer and Muslim history. It is owned by the Broken Hill City Council and is cared for by local man Ammin Nullah Shamroze (Bob Shamroze) and the Broken Hill Historical Society.

== Description ==
=== 1915 Picnic Train Attack Site ===
The site is marked by a memorial consisting of a replica freight wagon placed on the southern side of Picton Sales Yard Road, Broken Hill.

The embankment of the Tramway Permanent Way lies about 50m north of the memorial. In between is the trench of the water pipeline from Umberumberka Reservoir.

=== White Rocks Reserve ===
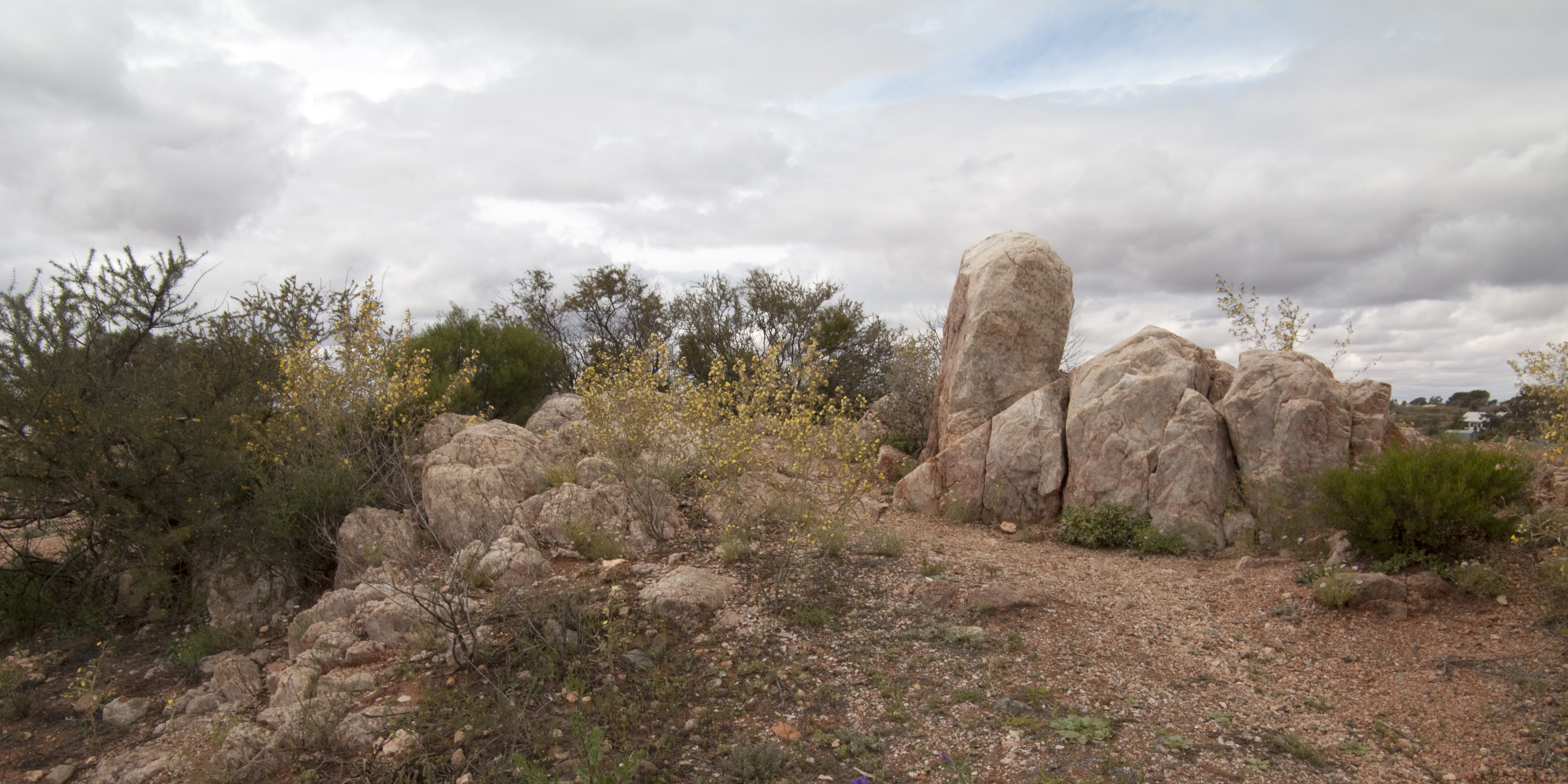
White Rocks Reserve

The area is a natural rocky quartz outcrop on the northern edge of Broken Hill surrounded by regeneration of vegetation and housing. The area is fenced with a short walking track and interpretation signs that tell the story of the attack, the geology and vegetation of the area. There is a reconstruction of the ice cream cart used by the two Afghan men on that day to conceal and transport their weapons. The reserve is now a popular tourist destination that is a part of the Broken Hill Heritage Tours.

=== Condition ===
As at 17 February 2017, the Picnic Train Attack site memorial is in good condition. The memorial is the only reminder of the event; there are no other known traces or archaeological evidence that a battle took place in this location. The railway line has long since been removed but the footprint of where the line was located is clear. A fence line across from the memorial shows one of the ways the unused railway line was salvaged. The ore wagon memorial on site displays an interpretation sign with two photos and information of the fateful day. The wooden section wagon has suffered from years of exposure to the weather, however the rest of the memorial is in good condition.

The White Rocks Reserve site is a fenced-in area that is in good condition and has been maintained as tourist attraction. Interpretation signs explain the incident that took place there and the geology of the area. It also displays a replica of the ice-cream cart used by Abdulla and Mahomed.

The original landscape is still intact and the railway line embankment and water pipeline trench still exist.

=== Modifications and dates ===
The area around the site of the 1915 picnic train attack has changed considerably since January 1915. The railway line is no longer in-situ although the railway line embankment is still visible. Silverton Tramway Company ceased operations in 1970 due to the standard gauge (4 ft 8.5in) line being opened in 1969 connecting NSW to SA. After the closure of the Silverton Tramway Company most of the narrow gauge railway line (3 ft 6in) was removed and recycled for fencing posts and rails, this includes the section of line where the attack took place. A fence now blocks access to the line embankment and the trench where the two men hid is no longer visible due to vegetation. Part of the area is now a semi-rural neighbourhood with the road on the northern side of the site now sealed.

The White Rocks site where the battle ended is now a tourist location on the outskirts of Broken Hill. The site has been fenced and displays of interpretations of 1 January 1915 and local geology are located throughout the area. A replica of the ice-cream cart was made by local Tafe and Skillshare students and put on the site in 1991 and a parking lot has been built to accommodate visitors to the site.

== Heritage listing ==
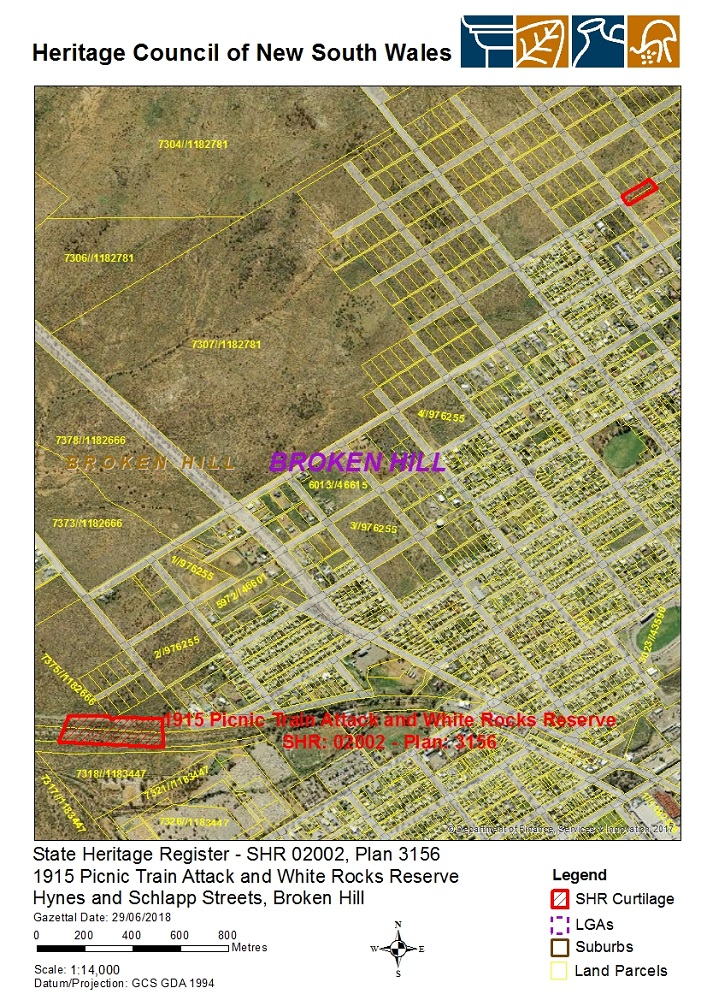
Heritage boundaries

As at 15 August 2017, the picnic train attack sites are of state heritage significance for their historical values as the only World War I incident where Australian citizens were attacked on Australian soil and under a foreign flag, resulting in the death of four people and wounding of seven, as well as the death of the two "Afghan" cameleer perpetrators. Although a minor incident in the greater history of the war, it had a significant effect on the population of Broken Hill, and right across Australia. It became national news for many months was widely reported on and commented on, with differing perspectives, many xenophobic and some liberal. The war effort initially focused on protecting Australia from attack by German naval ships and mining operations, however this attack, the only World War I attack on Australian soil, played out in the least expected location, the arid centre. This turned Australia's attention from looking out to sea for the enemy to looking within established communities across the nation. The Picnic Train attack had repercussions throughout Australia for people seen as enemy aliens and resulted in many of them being interned for the war period.

The state heritage significance of the sites are enhanced through association with the so-called Afghan cameleers in the arid regions of Australia, and in particular the people based at the Ghan Town on the outskirts of Broken Hill, and who worshiped at the SHR listed mosque. It is also associated with German and other migrants from countries allied with Germany, and the story of their treatment across Australia as enemy aliens during World War I. In addition the sites' state heritage significance may be again enhanced through association with the Manchester Unity of Oddfellows, members of which were subject of the Picnic Train attack.

The Picnic Attack Sites have state heritage significance for its research potential into the chequered history of multi-culturalism in Australia as the incident and story are a powerful example of the way that a story that is told reiteratively, having its beginnings in fear and prejudice, continues to be expressed in this way.

1915 Picnic Train Attack and White Rocks Reserve was listed on the New South Wales State Heritage Register on 29 June 2018 having satisfied the following criteria.

The place is important in demonstrating the course, or pattern, of cultural or natural history in New South Wales.

The picnic train attack sites are of state heritage significance for their historical values as the site of the only World War I incident where Australian citizens were attacked on Australian soil and under a foreign flag, resulting in the death of four people and wounding of seven, as well as the death of the two Muslim perpetrators. Although a minor incident in the greater history of the war, it had maximum effect on the population of Broken Hill, and right across Australia. It became national news for many months was widely reported on and commented on, with differing perspectives, many xenophobic and some liberal.

Up until this incident the War Precautions Act 1914 had not affected German or other enemy aliens in Broken Hill, or many other areas. It resulted in the burning of the German Club in Broken Hill, the expulsion of enemy alien miners and mine workers, and workers at the associated smelters at Port Pirie, and the incarceration of people in the Torrens Island internment camp, some later transferred to Holsworthy in Sydney. However innocent, people deemed enemy aliens were punished as a result of the picnic train attack.

The place has a strong or special association with a person, or group of persons, of importance of cultural or natural history of New South Wales's history.

The 1915 Picnic Train Attack is associated with the history the so-called Afghan cameleers in the arid regions of Australia, and in particular the people based at the Ghan Town on the outskirts of Broken Hill, and who worshiped at the SHR listed mosque. It is also associated with German and other migrants from countries allied with Germany, and the story of their treatment across Australia as enemy aliens during World War I. The history of cameleers in Broken Hill spans from when people first settled in Broken Hill through to today. Playing a key role in the outback transportation before the railway. Some of the cameleers remained in the area marrying local women. There are families in Broken Hill today that are descendants of the original cameleers that are still very active in preserving their culture and history in Broken Hill. The Picnic Train Attack and White Rocks Reserve sites provide evidence of the way the cameleers were treated by mainstream society. Mullah Abdullah, one of the attackers, led prayers at the Broken Hill mosque and provided halal meat. He became disaffected because he was not allowed to freely practice his religion. Gool Mahomed was subject to stone throwing and verbal abuse from non-Afghan youth, and felt his former enlistment in the Turkish army should be re-visited now Turkey was a German ally.

In addition the site state heritage significance is enhanced through association with the Manchester Unity of Oddfellows, members of which were subject of the Picnic Train attack. The history of the Manchester Unity of Oddfellows can be traced back to England 1066 and was established in Australia in 1840 in Melbourne. The fraternity existed in Broken Hill and surrounding areas from 1888 through until 1973 and with the Freemasons was related to the strong union movement in this mining town.

The place has a strong or special association with a particular community or cultural group in New South Wales for social, cultural or spiritual reasons.

The Picnic Train Attack and White Rocks Reserve is of local significance for the esteem in which it is held by the local community and by visitors and makes an important contribution to local history and identity. The attack on the picnic train changed the lives of many people in Broken Hill. Families lost loved ones that died on that day and people suffered from the trauma of witnessing such an event. Citizens lived in fear for some time wondering if another attack would take place. The German citizens and their families across Australia suffered because of their ethnicity, losing their jobs, being separated from their families and becoming prisoners of war. New South Wales had the most prisoner's camps. The Muslim families living in Ghan Town also faced increased abuse and suffering. The dramatic effects of the incident are still widely remembered by the contemporary local community and has been memorialised by the council, and the day is still remembered and mourned by family members connected to the victims.

The place has potential to yield information that will contribute to an understanding of the cultural or natural history of New South Wales.

The picnic train attack is of state heritage significance for its research potential as a powerful example of a story that is told reiteratively, having its beginnings in fear and prejudice and continues to be expressed in this way. It remains a powerful example of the way in which such reiterative stories are picked up and perpetuated by modern media over time. The Picnic Train Attack story is as relevant today as in 1915, with modern media interpretations of the picnic train attack following the same lack of clarity, empathy and social inclusiveness. In recent times it has been emotively expressed as the first jihadist terrorist attack in Australia and compared to the Lindt cafe siege, using conflation and confusion to create fear and bias towards a particular religion. It has state significance for its research potential into the chequered history of multi-culturalism in Australia.

The place possesses uncommon, rare or endangered aspects of the cultural or natural history of New South Wales.

The event of the train attack is the only known attack by enemy aliens to occur on Australian soil during World War I. The Ottoman flag is unique tangible evidence of the attack on the picnic train.

The place is important in demonstrating the principal characteristics of a class of cultural or natural places/environments in New South Wales.

The picnic train attack sites and the associated story are representative of the history of xenophobia and bigotry that has been a significant issue in NSW and Australia since the settlement of Australia by Europeans, and particularly during World War I and II.
