= The Golden Cage (1975 film) =

- Directed by: Ayten Kuyululu
- Written by: Ayten Kuyululu; Ismet Soydan
- Produced by: Ilhan Kuyululu
- Starring: Sait Misoglu; Ilhan Kuyululu; Kate Sheil
- Cinematography: Russell Boyd
- Edited by: Harold Lander
- Music by: Mary Vanderby; Aspidistra
- Production company: Independent Artists
- Release date: August 1975
- Running time: 70 minutes
- Country: Australia
- Languages: English; Turkish

The Golden Cage is a 1975 Australian film about two Turkish migrants in Australia directed by Ayten Kuyululu and produced by her husband Ilhan Kuyululu, who also acted in the film. It was the first Australian film directed by a woman since the 1930s.

== Cast ==
- Sait Misoglu as Ayhen
- Ilhan Kuyululu as Murat
- Kate Sheil as Sarah
- Ron Haddrick as Rich man
- Michele Fawdon as Guitar player
- Anna Simone Scott as Girl in tavern

== Production ==
The film was shot in March and April 1975, with the aid of $22,500 from the Film, Radio and Television Board of the Australia Council. It failed to achieve commercial distribution.

Kuyululu tried to produce a film The Battle of Broken Hill about the 1915 Battle of Broken Hill but was unable to secure finance and returned to Turkey.

Phillip Noyce worked as an assistant director on the movie.
