= Kate Sheil =

Australian actress (active 1971–2005)

- Born: Australia
- Other names: Kate Sheel; Katie Sheil
- Occupations: Stage and television actor
- Years active: 1971–2005

Kate Sheil is an Australian retired stage and television actress, whose roles include prison officer Janet Conway in two series of the cult television series Prisoner.

== Biography ==
Sheil first appeared in the 1971 television movie What for Marianne? During the next two years, she appeared on the television series Ryan, Boney, Matlock Police and as a regular cast member of situation comedy Birds in the Bush in 1972. She also had several appearances on Homicide from 1971 to 1976.

In 1975, she made her film debut in Ayten Kuyululu's The Golden Cage. She portrayed Sarah, a young teenager who befriends two newly arrived Turkish immigrants, falling in love with one of them, but leaving despite being pregnant when he proposes to her but demands that she convert to Islam. Sheil was the only Australian cast in the film.

During 1976, Sheil had a supporting role in the television movie Me & Mr Thorne as well as the television series Alvin Purple and Shannon's Mob. Later that year, she also starred with Tom Oliver and Gerard Maguire in David Williamson's A Handful of Friends at the Russell Street Theatre in Melbourne, one of many stage productions she was in, throughout her career. She also played a supporting role in The Singer and the Dancer the following year.

In 1980, she appeared on the television series Timelapse, Bellamy and in the television movie Air Hawk before being cast as school teacher Mrs. Velland in the 1981 film Puberty Blues. From 1981 to 1982, she also had a guest stint in Prisoner as Janet Conway, a former Wentworth inmate turned prison officer; a storyline which reunited her with Gerard Maguire from Me & Mr Thorne, and saw the two characters in a romantic subplot.

After appearing on Sons and Daughters in 1984, she again took a break from acting until the late 1980s appearing in the television mini-series Emma: Queen of the South Seas and Joe Wilson during 1988. After appearing in the 1990 film Weekend with Kate, she also made occasional television appearances in the television movie Heroes II: The Return and, during the late 1990s, guest starred on A Country Practice, Children's Hospital and Water Rats.

Between 2001 and 2005, she played a recurring character, Victoria Carlton, in the soap opera All Saints.

== Filmography ==
=== Film ===
Year	Film	Role	Notes
1975	The Golden Cage	Sarah	
1977	The Singer and the Dancer	Yong Mrs. Bilson	Short film
1981	Puberty Blues	Mrs. Velland	
1990	Weekend with Kate	Phoebe	
1997	Blackrock	Doctor	

=== Television ===
Year	Film	Role	Notes
1971, 1976	Homicide	Elly Sullivan / Chris Clark / Kay Marshall	3 episodes (as Katie Sheil)
1971	What For Marianne?	Marianne Malden	TV movie (as Katie Sheil)
1972	Birds in the Bush	Friday	Main cast
1973	Matlock Police	Lorraine Hughes	1 episode
1973	Boney	Gloria Lacey	1 episode
1973	Ryan	Ellen Cornell	1 episode
1974	Stopover	Kay Marshall (as Katie Sheil)	TV movie
1976	Alvin Purple	Sally	Episode: "London Derriere"
1976	Me & Mr Thorne	Shelley Gordon	TV movie
1978, 1980, 1981	Cop Shop	Tracey Powell / Karen Rush / Shawnee Lowe / Helen Radcliffe	Soap opera, 5 episodes
1980	Timelapse	Angela Parker	
1981	Bellamy	Kath	Episode: "A Matter of Upbringing"
1981	Airhawk	Wendy	TV movie
1981–1982	Prisoner	Janet Conway	Soap opera, recurring role (series 3–4)
1984	Sons and Daughters	Kathleen Elliott	Soap opera, 8 episodes
1986	Butterfly Island		1 episode
1987	Willing and Abel		1 episode
1988	Joe Wilson	Mrs. Black	Miniseries, 1 episode
1988	Emma: Queen of the South Seas	Gwen Purdam	Miniseries, 2 episodes
1989	Rafferty's Rules	Joy Finlayson	1 episode
1991	Heroes II: The Return	Roma's Mother	Miniseries, 2 episodes
1991	A Country Practice	Dr. Wendy Gale	1 episode
1993	A Country Practice	Sonia Newton	2 episodes
1994	Home and Away	Magistrate	1 episode
1994	G.P.	Yvonne Freith	1 episode
1997	Heartbreak High	Matron	1 episode
1998	Children's Hospital	Maureen	1 episode
1999	Water Rats	Coroner	1 episode
2001–2005	All Saints	Victoria Carlton	14 episodes (as Katie Sheil)

== Theatre ==
Year	Film	Role	Type
1967	Woyzeck	Marie	UNSW, Sydney
1967	The Choephori (The Libation Bearers)	Clytemnestra	UNSW, Sydney
1969	The Night of the Iguana	Frau Fahrenkopf / Charlotte Goodall	NIDA Theatre, Sydney
1969	Almost Like Being (Student Graduation Plays)	Doris	Jane Street Theatre, Sydney
1970	Cat on a Hot Tin Roof		UNSW, Sydney with NIDA
1970	A Midsummer Night’s Dream		UNSW, Sydney with NIDA
1970	Blood Wedding		UNSW, Sydney with NIDA
1975	The Lady from the Sea		St Martins Theatre, Melbourne with MTC
1976; 1978	Relatively Speaking		Bondi Pavilion, Sydney
1976	Le Chateau d'Hydro-Therapie Magnetique		Jane Street Theatre, Sydney with NIDA
1976	A Handful of Friends		Russell Street Theatre, Melbourne with MTC
1977	Boeing Boeing	Janet	Newcastle Civic Theatre, Theatre Royal Sydney, Her Majesty's Theatre, Brisbane with J. C. Williamson's & Edgley International
1978	Big Toys	Mag	SGIO Theatre, Brisbane with QTC
1978	The Cherry Orchard	Varya	SGIO Theatre, Brisbane with QTC
1978	Habeas Corpus		SGIO Theatre, Brisbane with QTC
1979	You Never Can Tell	Gloria	SGIO Theatre, Brisbane with QTC
1982–1983, 1992	Steaming	Jane	Opera Theatre, Adelaide, Theatre Royal Sydney, Comedy Theatre, Melbourne, Seymour Centre, Sydney, Canberra Theatre
1982	Virginia		Edward Street Theatre, Brisbane with QTC
1984	Caravan		Princess Theatre, Launceston, Civic Theatre, Burnie, Queens Park Theatre, Perth, Hoyts Prince Theatre, Hobart, Regal Theatre, Perth, Playhouse, Canberra, Playhouse, Adelaide with Ensemble Theatre
1989	Passion Play		Sydney Opera House with Gary Penny Productions
1990	The Odd Couple	Vera	Comedy Theatre, Melbourne, Majestic Cinemas, Sydney with John Reid Entertainment
1993	Jake's Women		Ensemble Theatre, Sydney
