= Broken Hill Mosque =

Australian mosque and museum

Broken Hill Mosque (Mohammedan Mosque and Afghan Mosque)
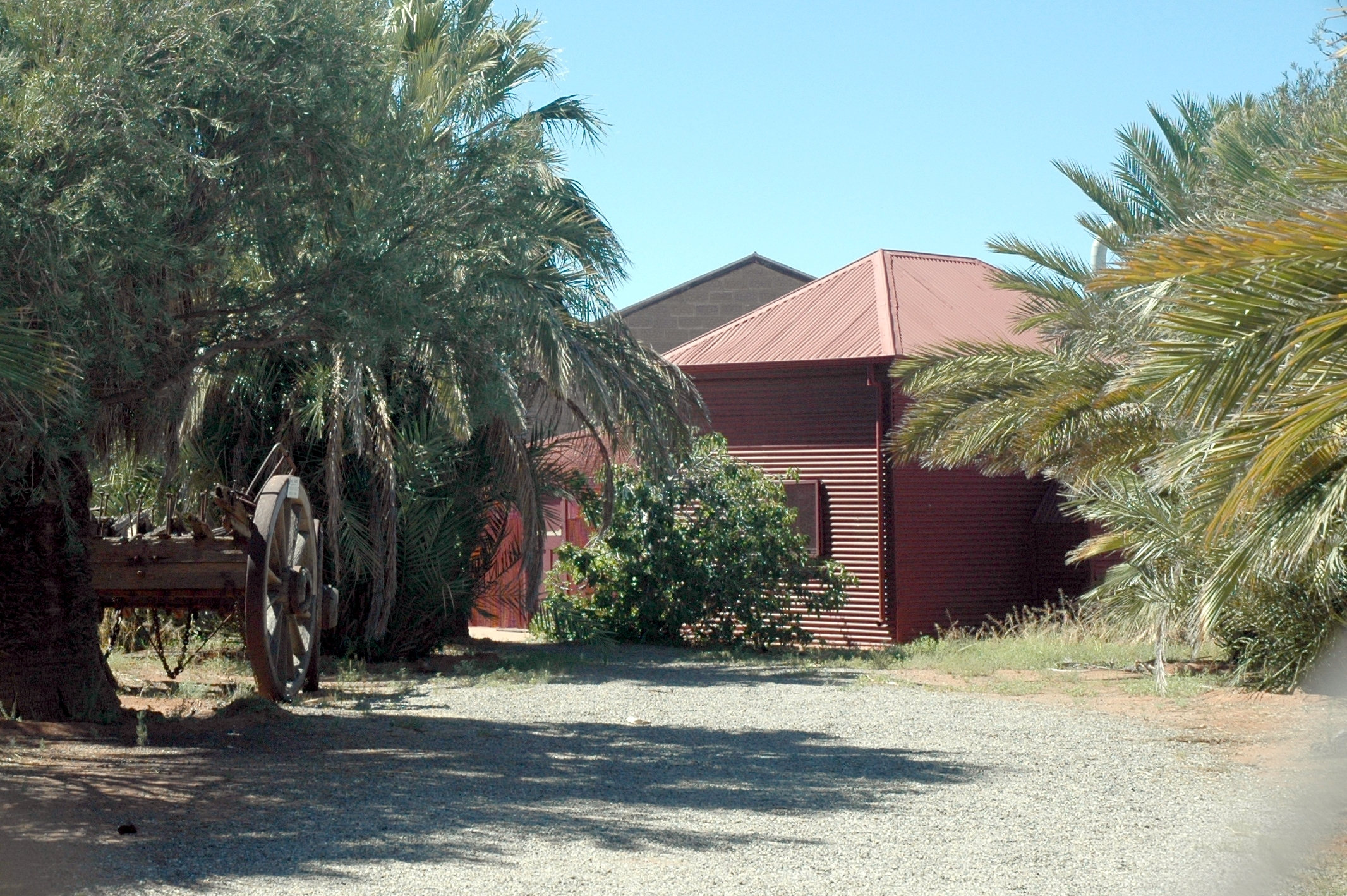
- The former mosque in 2007

- Location of the former mosque in New South Wales

Religion
- Affiliation: Islam (former)
- Ecclesiastical or organisational status: Mosque (1887–c. 1950s); Museum (since c. 1967)
- Ownership: Broken Hill City Council
- Status: Closed (as a mosque); Repurposed

Location
- Location: Buck Street, Broken Hill, City of Broken Hill, New South Wales
- Country: Australia
- Coordinates: 31°56′16″S 141°28′40″E

Architecture
- Completed: 1887
- Materials: Corrugated iron

New South Wales Heritage Register
- Official name: Broken Hill Mosque; Mohammedan Mosque; Afghan Mosque
- Type: State heritage (built)
- Designated: 23 April 2010
- Reference no.: 1819
- Type: Mosque
- Category: Religion
- Builders: Afghan Cameleers

The Broken Hill Mosque is a heritage-listed former Afghani mosque and now museum, located at Buck Street, Broken Hill, in the Far West of New South Wales, Australia. It was built by Afghan cameleers. It is also known as Mohammedan Mosque and Afghan Mosque. The property is owned by Broken Hill City Council. It was added to the New South Wales State Heritage Register on 23 April 2010.

== History ==
=== Wiljakali land ===
There were some fifteen groups of Aboriginal people traditionally living in the huge area bisected by the Darling River in the western plains of NSW. The principal group around Broken Hill was the Wiljakali. Their occupation of the area is thought to have been intermittent due to the scarcity of water. The same scarcity of water made the area unattractive for European occupiers and traditional Aboriginal ways of life continued longer there than in many other parts of NSW, into the 1870s. However, mobility was essential to life in the mallee and sandhills, and as Aboriginal people were increasingly deprived of the full range of their traditional options, they were obliged to come into stations or missions in times of drought to avoid starvation. By the 1880s, traditional lifestyles were being supplanted by mission lifestyles, with many Aboriginal people also working on stations or within the mining industry. With the failure of most of the stations during the 1890s depression, many local Aboriginal groups were again displaced and ended up living in reservations created under the Aborigines' Protection Act 1909. The influenza epidemic of 1919 had a further significant impact upon the indigenous population, as did the twentieth century federal government policy of removing Aboriginal children from their families.

=== Mining history in Broken Hill ===
The term Broken Hill was first used by the early British explorer Charles Sturt in his diaries during his search for an inland sea in 1844. Western plains towns far away from the major rivers, such as Broken Hill, owe their existence to the mineral discoveries made in the decade after 1875, when spectacular deposits of gold, silver, copper and opal were found.

The township of Broken Hill was developed in the "Broken Hill Paddock", which was part of Mt Gipps Station. George McCulloch, the station manager, employed many men. It was in 1883 that three of his workers pegged the first mineral lease on his property. They were Charles Rasp, David James and James Poole. The Syndicate of Seven was formed and consisted of George McCulloch, Charles Rasp, David James, James Poole, George Urquhart and George Lind. These men pegged out the remaining six mineral leases, which are now known as the Line of Lode. It was the seventh member of the Syndicate, Philip Charley, who found the first amount of silver in 1885. A township was soon surveyed, and Broken Hill was initially known as a shanty town with an entire suburb named "Canvas Town" for its temporary buildings.

=== Cameleering history in Australia and Broken Hill ===
In the nineteenth century, camel drivers led hundreds of camel trains throughout inland Australia. By the turn of the twentieth century, their camel trains provided transport for many major inland development projects. The cameleers carted produce, water, mail and equipment across the continent at a time when roads and railways were not yet constructed. The camels and their keepers were crucial to projects like the construction of the Overland Telegraph, for which they carried supplies and materials used in surveying and construction work. They also accompanied a number of exploration parties into the little-known interior. These early Cameleers contributed significantly to the development of rural and remote Australia.

It is estimated that some 20,000 camels were brought to Australia during the second half of the nineteenth century from all different parts of the world to work in the vast areas of inland Australia. Accompanying the camels were their drivers, these men came from different countries and provinces such as Kashmir, Sindh, Rajasthan, Egypt, Persia, Turkey, Punjab, Baluchistan, and former provinces of Afghanistan and modern-day India and Pakistan. Collectively they were known as "Afghans," although very few were actually of Afghani descent, it is now widely (and subjectively) used to describe the Cameleers.

The forerunners of the camels to enter the Broken Hill district were imported in 1866 by Sir Thomas Elder for use in northern South Australia. The Afghans, or Ghans as they became known, were well established by the time of Broken Hill's discovery in 1883 and in succeeding years, camel teams and Afghans were a familiar sight in Broken Hill and the West Darling District of NSW. Camels were used either to haul heavy wagons, and twelve or more camels were used to pull a ten-ton wagon travelling at a rate at 15 miles per day. Once camp was reached the Afghans slept in a temporary corrugated-iron shed or bower of gum branches. They led a nomadic life with few personal possessions. As they were of the Islamic faith, they did not drink alcohol so were a popular choice for carting beer and spirits to the hotels on the goldfields.

Camels and Afghans played a crucial role in exploratory expeditions and scientific survey parties in the outback. Afghans were among the first non-Aboriginal people to view such iconic landmarks of central Australia, such as Kata Tjuta and Uluru, and had their own names ascribed along the way to places such as Allanah's Hill and Kamran's Well as the explorers mapped the emerging geography they traversed. Within just six years of the arrival of Elder's first camels, and just a decade after Burke and Wills' first north–south crossing of the continent, the Afghans with their camels had built the overland telegraph from Adelaide through to Darwin that would connect Australia direct to London. The construction of railways was shortly to follow including the Afghan's namesake, the famous North Australia Railway (known as the 'Ghan') line from Port Augusta to Alice Springs. The Ghan service's name is an abbreviated version of its previous nickname "The Afghan Express," which comes from the Afghans that trekked the same route as the overland telegraph, which is said to have been the route taken by John McDouall Stuart during his 1862 crossing of Australia before the advent of the railway.

The Afghans travelled lightly and were always ready to move. The men were typically engaged on limited term contracts that did not allow for women or children to accompany them to Australia. Many therefore worked and lived communally as a brotherhood of fellow cameleers, observing strict religious and related halal dietary practices that tended to discourage significant social interaction with others. Theirs was an itinerant mode of dwelling negotiated spatially through movement, camping along the camel trails, resting between journeys in their Ghantowns.

Dost Mahomet was a prominent Afghan camel driver who worked at Broken Hill and arrived with the camels and later travelled part of the distance and assisted the explorers. His grave lies three kilometres from Menindee, on the road to Broken Hill. he is understood to be the first Muslim to be buried on Australian soil.

=== Mosques as an element of Muslim culture ===
The Afghans generally lived away from white populations, at first in makeshift camel camps, and later in Ghantowns on the edges of existing settlements. For most of the year they were solitary travellers lacking the camaraderie and powerful sense of community or "Ummah" that Islam bestows. The Afghans performed their prayers five times daily out in the desert, the empty bushland, or countryside. In Islam great emphasis is placed on the conduct of prayer. One of the pillars of Islam is to conduct Prayers (Salat) as a way of connecting the individual with the one and Only God who created us to worship Him. Salat can be performed at any clean place ensuring that the worshipper is directed towards the Kaaba in Mecca. Muslims are encouraged to perform their obligatory prayers, Friday prayers and celebrate key Islamic events, in the Islamic calendar, at a mosque in congregation.

Muhammad said: "God, Great and Glorious is He, has said in one of His Books: The Mosques are My houses on My earth. My visitors are those who frequent them, so blessed is he who purifies himself in his own house, then visits Me in Mine. For the host has a duty to entertain his guest".

A mosque represents an Islamic symbol of the presence of Muslim followers dispersed throughout the globe. It is a centre for guidance, fountains Islamic knowledge and its dissemination, a shelter for the homeless, provides charitable distributions, and is a centre for religious celebrations and occasions. It can also encompass diverse activities that include facilities for receiving dignitaries, guests and other welfare services that reflect the needs of the community. An important celebration of the Islamic religion is Eid ul-Fitr, marking the end of Ramadan (the month of fasting), and Eid ul-Adha, (the Sacrifice of Feast). According to Islam, fasting should not be undertaken while travelling, so the Afghans would cease working during the Holy month and join to fast and pray. At the end of the 30 days, during which no food, water or tobacco could pass their lips from sunrise to sunset, the men would enjoy the Eid-ul-Fitr celebration.

If the devotees were not near a mosque for the morning or evening prayers, they would attempt to maintain their religious practices. Many old-timers from Broken Hill recall seeing Afghans in the bush working with their camel trains, stopping mid way at a certain time, kneeling on their mats praying.

=== Broken Hill ===
Broken Hill was a central hub at which several important camel trails and stock droving routes of the outback met the railroad and became a prominent place of commercial interaction between Afghans and Europeans. So numerous were the cameleers and their camels in Broken Hill that there were two camel camps, with “the west camp being at Picton, three miles out; while the north camp, which has no particular name, is in the northern corner, and distant from the municipality some two miles.” With its high concentration of Afghans, the camp at Broken Hill developed as one of the most established Ghantowns of the outback. The township has since expanded to encompass the sites of both camps such that only the mosque site at the northern cameleer settlement now marks the camp.

The Ghantown along with the dwellings of the local Aboriginal people were rarely located near the centre of town, which clearly segregated the "whites" from the "others". Essentially in towns where the Afghans worked there were three groups, a camp for the Afghans, a camp for the local Aboriginal people and in town was where the Europeans lived.

Despite the cameleers' historical and instrumental role in the development of NSW, the lack of substantive material and proprietary claims to "place" on the part of most of these men denied them recognition as a constituent community within the emerging cultural fabric of the new nation. Along with Aboriginal people, the Afghans experienced racial discrimination and both spatial and economic marginalisation in the Australia of the early twentieth-century. Labour unions representing the powerful lobby of white teamsters had long orchestrated racist antagonism against the Afghans in an unsuccessful bid to exclude them and their camels from the transport business. But once the teamsters began to replace their horses with motorised vehicles, the competitive advantage of camels was rapidly overcome. By the time of World War I, there was little place or purpose remaining for the camels and the Afghans within NSW.

Out-of-work cameleers were compelled to come in from the bush and shift into other forms of employment wherever they could find it. Many became hawkers and day labourers, eking out a living in the margins of larger urban settlements such as Adelaide and Broken Hill.

Following the war, camel transport was finally eclipsed in Australia. In due course the Afghan cameleers substantially vanished. Some returned to Afghanistan or resettled in the new Islamic state of Pakistan that emerged. Most Afghans who came to Australia were single or if married left their wives behind as they expected to return wealthy. Many remained single, others married Aboriginal women and few married European women. Those who took wives in Australia were ultimately assimilated, according to the strict segregationist policies of the government, into either the Aboriginal or European communities. Even the ghantowns - the only material places the Afghans had called home - were gradually abandoned as they lost their economic base.

=== Broken Hill Mosque ===
The first mosque in NSW was built in Broken Hill in 1887. This was some 16 years after the first mosque to be built in Australia, the Marree Mosque, was constructed in Marree in northern South Australia in 1861.

The Broken Hill Mosque is located on the corner of 703 William St and 246 Buck Street in north Broken Hill. The Cameleers lived in two camps, one at north Broken Hill, off the end of Chapple Street, and the other camp at west Broken Hill on the corner of Kaolin and Brown Streets. Each camp had its own mosque but the west camp mosque was relocated when the area was redeveloped for housing c.1903 and placed behind the main north camp mosque which survives today as the Broken Hill Mosque.

The land upon which the Broken Hill Mosque sits was first granted in 1891 as part of "Portion 1940", bought by David (or Daniel) Miller of Broken Hill. In 1903 Miller sold the portion to "Afzul of Broken Hill, camel driver". He was also known as Faizullah. The mosque was used for worship by the local Muslim community for more than forty years. It fell to disrepair after the death of Afzul, the last regularly practising Muslim and acting Mullah. His son, Abdul Fazulla of Broken Hill, a truck carrier/labourer inherited the land in 1961. In 1962 "Portion 1940" was transformed from the Old Titles system into the Torrens Title system and renamed Lot 2 DP 205329. In 1966 the lot was subdivided and renamed Lots 1 and 2 DP 520764, with the mosque being located on Lot 2. The Council of the City of Broken Hill acquired Lot 2 DP 520764 in 1967. After renovation by the Broken Hill Historical Society it was re-dedicated by visiting Muslim officials as a place of worship on 21 September 1968.

The Broken Hill mosque is a modest structure, made from corrugated iron sheeting, which the Afghans themselves regularly transported into the outback. The Broken Hill camp was described as follows:

"Two camps of teamsters on the sandy outskirts of the town, squalid collections of rusty corrugated iron and hessian humpies. They were at most two roomed dwellings...narrow, rutted lines bisected the huts. There was a stone built mosque in a small, sandy square, its low minaret scantily shaded by a dusty pepper tree. They were picturesquely squalid characters, known popularly among us in boyhood years as "hooshtas" from the command they gave the camels... All of them wore turbans and long baggy white cotton trousers..Sunday mornings we visited the "Ghan" camps...Children in large number played in the dust at the doors of the huts…".

— The Age, 1955.

The men, particularly the older and more devout Muslims, went to the mosque regularly. Friday being the most popular day, being the equivalent of a Christian Sunday. Some Afghans would not work on a Friday between noon and 2 pm. A mosque attendant would call the men to prayer by singing out loudly from the mosque's grounds. Abdul Fazulla, recalled seeing such a person, Mohamed Raffeeg, standing on the cement outside the mosque, putting his hands cupped with palms outward to the side of his face and calling the men to prayer. His voice travelled over the camp to the Ghantown at the north end of Chapple Street. It was well used even when the Ghan community diminished in later years and the few people remaining in Broken Hill continued to use it regularly up till 1940 and then less frequently until the death of the last Mullah in the 1950s.

Footwear must not be worn by any person entering the mosque and the Afghans observed the custom of having their feet washed before entering the building. Upon removing their footwear the Afghans stood beside a concrete channel as water was poured over their feet. They then entered the mosque by walking on two specially constructed stepping stones.

At present there are few descendants of the early Afghan families in Broken Hill. The mosque was disused for many years from the middle of the twentieth century and was acquired by Broken Hill City Council in 1967. The Broken Hill Historical Society saved the mosque from demolition and continue to be custodians for the site. A small museum has been established in the anteroom of the mosque for display of camel bells, nose pegs, photographs, the stepping stones, camel saddles, traditional female and male headgear from Baluchistan. In a glass showcase is a walking stick that belonged to the last Mullah along with other items associated with the Islamic religion. Broken Hill Council also opens the mosque for worship on request. Travellers of the Islamic faith often stop by to worship at the mosque when travelling through Broken Hill. Members of the NSW Afghan Community travel to Broken Hill annually to worship at the mosque as do members of the Islamic Council of NSW.

In January 2016, the building's caretaker, Amminnullah Robert Shamroze, grandson of the last Mullah, expressed concern about the building's future due to its physical deterioration. He stated that it was suffering from termites, water damage and the "ravages of time", that the prayer room needed a new floor, that the wall needed to be checked on one side, and that the windows, back wall, and roof of the annex needed to be fixed. The Mayor of Broken Hill, Winston Cuy, stated "Broken Hill is about our history. It should be preserved...Exactly who is going to preserve it? We’re not quite sure at this point in time." In April 2017, the state opposition called on the government to fund the restoration of both the mosque and the Broken Hill Synagogue.

Later in April 2017, the state government pledged $113,000 - to be matched by the Broken Hill City Council - to fix the mosque's interior and exterior walls and termite-damaged floor.

== Description ==
The mosque is located on the corner of 246 Buck Street and 703 William Street, North Broken Hill, NSW. Access to the mosque is gained via Buck Street.

The mosque is constructed of corrugated iron sheets and wood painted rust red (which is the colour of the original mosque and a typical colour of Broken Hill). It is in fair condition. The adjoining anteroom is also constructed of the same materials. The prayer area has an alcove (miḥrāb) in the middle of the north-western wall that protrudes beyond the main wall, sectioned out for the Imam and indicating the direction of prayer (qibla). The mosque sits on a dusty site with an avenue of date palm trees which were planted in 1965 by the Broken Hill Historical Society. At the entrance of the site are two olive trees which were planted by the Islamic Council of NSW in December 2008.

On the site are also original camel wagon wheels, made from wood and iron, used by historic cameleers in the town, mainly Shamroze Khan and Poujen Khan. Other items of moveable collection include camel bells, camel nose pegs and prayer mats housed in both the anteroom and the mosque. Samia Khatun identified a book within the exhibition room, previously mislabelled a Qur’an, as “a 500-page volume of Bengali Sufi poetry” titled Kasasol Ambia, corresponding to Stories of the prophets (Qiṣaṣ al-anbiyāʾ). Another item identified within the exhibition room is a handwritten Sufi manuscript (MSQ 0039), authored by Aḥmad al-Qādirī in 1901 and addressed to Aḥmad Akbar Khān al-Afghānī, indicating an affiliation to the Qādiriyya Sufi order.

Near the entrance to the mosque Outside the mosque is an area with water access for ablutions (wuḍūʾ). Upon removing their footwear the men stood beside the concrete channel to complete their ablutions, a prerequisite for prayer. The specially constructed stepping stones used to enter the mosque are now housed in the anteroom.

The mosque was reported to be in fair condition as at 16 February 2010.

== Heritage listing ==
The Broken Hill Mosque is of State significance for its rarity as the first mosque built in NSW and the only surviving Ghantown mosque in Australia. Constructed in 1887, the mosque provides rare evidence of the pioneering presence of the "Afghan" cameleers in outback NSW during the nineteenth and early twentieth centuries. It embodies, in built form, evidence of the historic presence of Islamic culture in Australia, otherwise rarely found in NSW. The Broken Hill Mosque is of social significance at a State level for its religious associations for the Islamic community in NSW and Australia.

Broken Hill Mosque was listed on the New South Wales State Heritage Register on 23 April 2010 having satisfied the following criteria.

The place is important in demonstrating the course, or pattern, of cultural or natural history in New South Wales.

The Broken Hill Mosque has State historical significance for its involvement in the early cameleering days and for its close association with the early history of Broken Hill. It represents the contribution the "Afghans" made to opening up the outback and, importantly, being the first town to connect NSW to London via the overland telegraph lines which they helped construct. The mosque's historical importance is as the first mosque built in NSW, and the only surviving mosque built by cameleers in Australia still standing.

The place has a strong or special association with a person, or group of persons, of importance of cultural or natural history of New South Wales's history.

The Broken Hill Mosque is of State significance for its association with the men who built the mosque, who came from different parts of the Middle East and were collectively known as "Afghans". These men made a vital contribution by significantly opening up the outback, constructing overland telegraph lines which connected NSW to London, constructing railways, erecting fences, acting as guides for several major expeditions, as well as supplying almost every inland mine or station with its goods and services. The mosque is a lasting symbol of the men who worked as "pilots of the desert" and made this vital contribution to NSW and Australia.

The place is important in demonstrating aesthetic characteristics and/or a high degree of creative or technical achievement in New South Wales.

Architecturally, the building is of State significance for its blending of traditional Islamic design and motifs with the use of local corrugated iron sheets and other vernacular materials, such as various woods. The mosque represents Islamic architectural style and detailing such as the arch in the alcove, and the wudu facilities. It offers cultural evidence in built form of a Middle Eastern and Islamic cultural aesthetic in Australia.

The place has strong or special association with a particular community or cultural group in New South Wales for social, cultural or spiritual reasons.

The mosque is of State social significance for its associations with the Islamic community in NSW. It is held in high esteem by the executive board of the Australian Federation of Islamic Councils and by the Islamic Council of NSW. As it is a place of worship and a Holy Site, the rest of the Islamic community is likely to have strong spiritual, social and cultural connections to the mosque as they become more aware of its existence. The mosque is also held in high regard by the Broken Hill Historical Society to whom it communicates a sense of place and identity as they have been its custodians and have maintained it for many years. As the mosque is a part of the Islamic community it remains functioning as a mosque for Muslim travellers and functions as a museum to the local community.

The place has potential to yield information that will contribute to an understanding of the cultural or natural history of New South Wales.

The mosque is of State significance for its research potential to contribute to an understanding of Islamic culture and its contribution to the pioneering days of the NSW outback and the development of Australia's interior. The mosque is valuable for its representation of early Islamic settlement in Australia in the late nineteenth and twentieth centuries. As it is the only surviving mosque built by the cameleers in Australia, the mosque is a rare source of information which offers material evidence of this poorly documented aspect of early Australian outback settlement and history.

The place possesses uncommon, rare or endangered aspects of the cultural or natural history of New South Wales.

The mosque is of State significance for being unique as the only surviving "Ghan town" mosque in NSW and Australia. It was the first mosque constructed in NSW, and the second mosque in all of Australia. As such, the Broken Hill Mosque provides rare evidence of the Islamic way of life and strongly demonstrates the early cameleering religious practices.

The place is important in demonstrating the principal characteristics of a class of cultural or natural places/environments in New South Wales.

The building is an example of a typical "Ghan town" mosque used with distinctive local elements, such as the corrugated iron, which is representative of the pioneering days in the far west of NSW. It represents a community approach to survival and adaptation to life in a foreign country.

== See also ==
- Afghan cameleers in Australia
- History of Islam in Australia
- List of mosques in Australia
