= Birds in the Bush =

1972 Australian television series

- Written by: David Croft
- Directed by: David Croft
- Starring: Hugh Lloyd; Ron Frazer; Alastair Duncan; Kate Fitzpatrick; Elli Maclure; Ann Sidney; Susan Lloyd; Briony Behets; Kate Sheil
- Countries of origin: Australia; United Kingdom
- No. of episodes: 13

Production
- Producer: Margaret Bond
- Running time: 30 minutes
- Production company: George Rockey Productions

Original release
- Network: Seven Network (Australia); BBC1 (United Kingdom)
- Release: 3 May – 26 July 1972

Birds in the Bush (also known as The Virgin Fellas and Strike It Rich) is an Australian/British sitcom that was broadcast in 1972.

== Plot ==
The series was set on a remote Australian property run by seven beautiful but naïve young women. When the property is inherited by an English water diviner (Hugh Lloyd) he and his Australian half-brother (Ron Frazer) and an assistant (Kate Fitzpatrick) begin living on the property and attempt to teach the nubile young women the ways of the world.

The series focused on the physical attractiveness of the young women, who all wore skimpy blue smocks and had names like "Abigail", "Lolita", "Tuesday", "Wednesday" and "Buster", along with Carry On-style innuendo.

== Cast ==
- Hugh Lloyd as Hugh
- Ron Frazer as Ron
- Alastair Duncan as Hoffnung
- Kate Fitzpatrick as Michelle
- Elli Maclure as Abigail
- Ann Sidney as Nanny
- Susan Lloyd as Lolita
- Kate Sheil as Friday
- Briony Behets as Tuesday
- Nicola Flamer-Caldera as Wednesday
- Jenny Hayes as Buster
- Les Foxcroft as Jim

== Production ==
The series was written and directed by David Croft and was intended primarily for a UK audience. As UK television was by now broadcasting in colour, it meant that Birds in the Bush was also shot in colour, but this necessitated shooting the series on film rather than videotape, as the ATN7 television studios in Australia were yet to be converted to colour.

== Reaction ==
The series began on air in Australia on 3 May 1972 but rated poorly there. Likewise UK ratings were low and the series run was cancelled there before all the episodes had been shown (it ran on BBC1 from 10 July 1972 until 21 August 1972). Just one season of 13 30-minute episodes was produced.

Cast member Kate Sheil, who played one of the naive girls, later said of her participation in the series that "I'm still trying to live that down because a lot of people hated it. We just run around saying these amazing things. I used to watch it for the scenery".
