= Mullah Abdullah =

Mass killer in Australia (1855–1915)

- Born: c. 1855; Afghanistan or India (Note: the north-west frontier of British India, present-day Pakistan)
- Died: 1 January 1915 (aged 59–60); Broken Hill, New South Wales
- Cause of death: Shot in the head
- Occupation: Butcher

Mullah Abdullah (c. 1855 – 1 January 1915) was a butcher, cameleer and spree killer. While his exact place of birth is unknown, sources give his birthplace as either Afghanistan or India. He was one of the perpetrators of the Battle of Broken Hill, a mass shooting which left six dead and seven injured.

== Career and death ==
Mullah Abdullah arrived in South Australia in about 1890, primarily in search for a job. He found one as a cameleer in 1899, at Broken Hill, New South Wales. Stevens claims he also served as an imam to "Afghan" immigrants at their "Ghantown", leading daily prayers, and was the spiritual head of the group of "Afghan" cameleers, something the secondary literature repeats, though there is no substantial evidence Abdullah occupied this role and suggestions he would not have been able to fulfil the function of Imam. In charge of the killing of animals according to the principles of halal for consumption by Muslims, he was prosecuted twice for his allegedly unsanitary means of killing the animals, and for not joining the local Butchers' Union. This caused Abdullah to bear great ill-feeling towards the Union, as well as the local sanitary inspector, Brosnan, who prosecuted him.

Another camel-driver and Abdullah's next-door neighbour, Gool Badsha Mahomed, was an Afridi tribesman from Afghanistan, and had fought in the Turkish Army. After the start of World War I, his religious and nationalistic fervour increased as he became infuriated by the conflict.

Mullah Abdullah and Gool formed an alliance and plotted a mass shooting, to take place on 1 January 1915 in the Battle of Broken Hill. On that date, the duo opened fire on the open carriages of a picnic train which was taking people to Silverton for the annual Manchester Unity Order of Oddfellows New Year's Day picnic. Following a long exchange of fire, local police officers shot Abdullah dead. Gool died of gunshot wounds in hospital. The total death toll among the train passengers was four, with seven others severely wounded. Abdullah and Gool were buried secretly at a public building later that day.
