= Ayten Kuyululu =

Turkish-Australian filmmaker (1930–2019)

- Born: Ayten Ürkmez; 30 August 1930; Istanbul, Turkey
- Died: 31 May 2019 (aged 88); Sydney, Australia
- Occupations: Film director; actress; opera singer; screenwriter
- Notable work: The Golden Cage
- Spouse: Ilhan Kuyululu
- Children: 3

Ayten Kuyululu (née Ürkmez; 30 August 1930 – 31 May 2019) was a Turkish-Australian film director, actress, opera singer and screenwriter. She was the first woman to direct a feature film in Australia since 1933 with The Golden Cage (1975).

== Early life and career ==
Kuyululu was born in Istanbul in 1930. As a young woman she was an actress and opera singer, and wrote radio plays. In the mid-1960s she moved to Stockholm, together with her husband Ilhan Kuyululu and their three children. While living in Stockholm she directed a television drama film called The Outsiders about the lives of migrants in Sweden, and wrote the screenplay for a 1963 Turkish film called İki Kocalı Kadın. She also sang with the Royal Swedish Opera.

The family moved to Australia in 1971. After initially working as a department store clerk, Kuyululu joined the chorus of Opera Australia and acted in television shows including Matlock Police, Ryan and Homicide. Together with her husband she established and ran the Australian Turkish People's Playhouse.

In 1974 she wrote, directed and starred in the 40-minute film A Handful of Dust about the challenges of a Turkish couple who meet in Sydney. She had received a grant from the Experimental Film Fund to support the work. The film was a finalist in the Greater Union Awards at the 1974 Sydney Film Festival and has been described by academic Adrian Danks as receiving a "generally positive reception" that supported her subsequent production of The Golden Cage.

== The Golden Cage ==
In 1975 Kuyululu directed the 70-minute film The Golden Cage, about a pair of male Turkish friends struggling to settle in Australia. She was the first woman in Australia to direct a film since Paulette McDonagh over forty years previously. Kuyululu's husband produced the film and played a starring role. It was supported by a $20,000 grant from the Film and Television Board, and included footage shot in Istanbul.

The Golden Cage premiered as part of the 1975 International Women's Film Festival in Sydney, but Kuyululu was unable to find a distributor. One of the challenges was that the film's backers required that the dialogue be in English, which led it to seem inauthentic. Danks notes that the film has been "consistently marginalised and often forgotten about in accounts of Australian film history"; it was screened only rarely, including occasionally on SBS in the 1980s.

Following The Golden Cage, Kuyululu planned to write and direct a film about the 1915 Battle of Broken Hill. She was unable to get funding as a Turkish woman director, and had to engage Donald Crombie to take over as the proposed director, while she wrote the screenplay. She was however unsuccessful in getting the film made.

== Later life and death ==
Kuyululu returned to live in Sweden in the late 1970s and early 1980s, where she directed and performed in Royal Swedish Opera productions. She returned to Australia in 1985, where she worked in the Australian People's Theatre and formed a Turkish amateur theatre group with her son. In 1989 she wrote and directed the Turkish language film Suçlu mu Piyon mu? (Is he Guilty or is he a Pawn?).

In 2019 she died in Sydney. David Stratton, writing in The Australian, recorded that at the time of her death she was "almost completely forgotten by the mainstream arts world". Historian Sue Hardisty notes that her two films stand out in the "overwhelmingly Anglo-Celtic" environment of 1970s Australian film.

In November 2023, The Golden Cage was screened by the Melbourne Cinematheque and ACMI as part of a program focusing on migrant women directors in Australia in the 1970s and 1980s.
