= Timelapse (TV series) =

- Genre: Drama
- Country of origin: Australia
- No. of seasons: 1
- No. of episodes: 12

Production
- Running time: 50 minutes

Original release
- Network: ABC
- Release: 12 March – 28 May 1980

Timelapse is an Australian sci-fi drama television series which first screened on the ABC in 1980.

== Cast ==
- Robert Coleby as Douglas Hardy
- John Meillon as Premier Dakin
- Vincent Ball as Boyd Mackiel
- Kate Sheil as Angela Parker
- Tony Barry as Inspector Warren
- Anne Charleston as Dell
- Kerry Francis as Dr. Fallon
- Stephen Griffiths as Martin
- Matthew McGrath as Sandy
- Anne Tenney

== Synopsis ==
Set in 1991, it centres around Douglas Hardy, a computer genius who is cryogenically frozen by corrupt politicians after being murdered in 1979. Hardy returns to seek his revenge and bring down the now fascist, or more accurately, authoritarian state government of New South Wales. The ending subverts everything you thought you knew about the Premier, with the protagonist making a surprising choice and ending with the threat of nuclear Armageddon.
