= Broken Hill Synagogue =

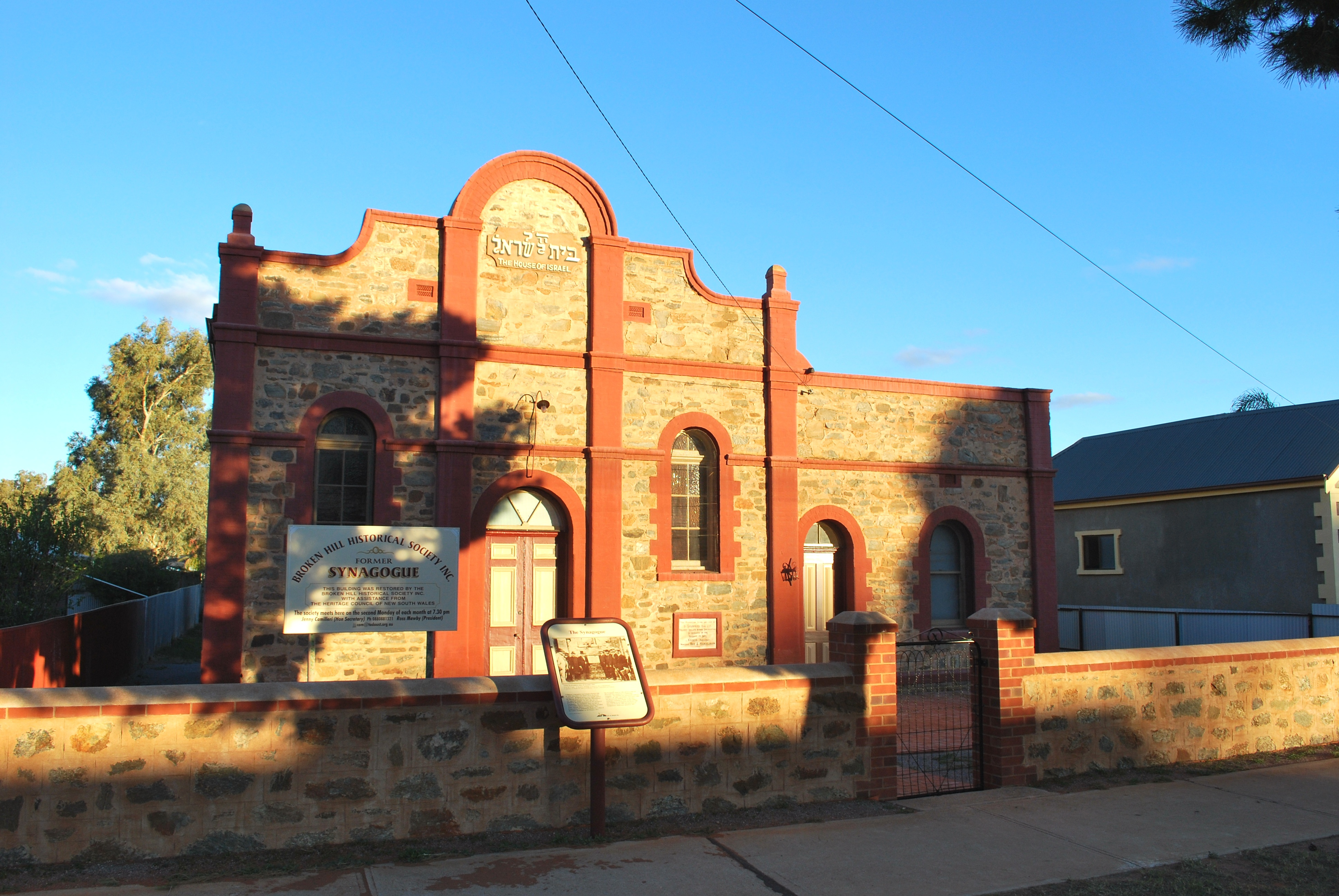
- Former Broken Hill Synagogue, 2009

- Location in Broken Hill, New South Wales

Religion
- Affiliation: Judaism
- Ecclesiastical or organisational status: Closed
- Ownership: Broken Hill Historical Society Inc.; Synagogue of The Outback Museum (SOTOM)
- Year consecrated: 1911
- Status: Synagogue of the Outback Museum; Broken Hill Historical Society

Location
- Location: 165 Wolfram Street, Broken Hill, City of Broken Hill, New South Wales
- Country: Australia
- Coordinates: 31.9569°S 141.4595°E

Architecture
- Groundbreaking: 30 November 1910
- Completed: 1911; 115 years ago
- New South Wales Heritage Register
- Official name: Broken Hill Synagogue; Historical Society
- Type: State heritage (built)
- Designated: 2 April 1999
- Reference no.: 675
- Type: Synagogue
- Category: Religion

The Broken Hill Synagogue is a heritage-listed former synagogue and now museum at 165 Wolfram Street, Broken Hill, in the Far West of New South Wales, Australia. The property is owned by the Broken Hill Historical Society. It now houses the Synagogue of the Outback Museum. It was added to the New South Wales State Heritage Register on 2 April 1999.

== History ==
The Broken Hill Synagogue is one of only three purpose-built synagogues in rural New South Wales.

A Jewish community began to develop in Broken Hill in the 1880s. The Jewish cemetery was consecrated on 17 May 1891, with the founders of the Broken Hill Hebrew Congregation arriving after 1891. The synagogue was established "almost exclusively" by Jews of Lithuanian and Ukrainian backgrounds, such that Jewish life in Broken Hill "reflected the orthodox practice of nineteenth century Russian Jewry".

A meeting in 1900 decided to establish a formal congregation and build a synagogue at Broken Hill. Initial attempts to raise building funds were unsuccessful, but found success later that decade, and a site was purchased in July 1907. From 1900 until the completion of the synagogue, Jewish services were held in the Masonic Hall.

The foundation stone for the synagogue was placed on 30 November 1910, and the building was consecrated on 26 February 1911. Its Torah scrolls were presents from the Adelaide congregation. The debt from its construction had been paid off by October 1914.

By 1961, the number of identifiable Jews in Broken Hill had decreased to fifteen. The synagogue closed in 1962, with the Sefer Torah scrolls transferred to the Yeshiva in the Melbourne suburb of St Kilda. The building had fallen into disrepair and was described as "derelict" at the time of its closure.

Following the synagogue's closure, the building served as a private residence. It was purchased by the Broken Hill Historical Society in 1990, who restored the property.

It now serves as the Synagogue of the Outback Museum and houses the Broken Hill Historical Society. A replica Sefer Torah was installed in the museum in 2017.

The building suffered $140,000 in hailstorm damage in 2017. Despite advocacy by the state opposition, it was overlooked by the state government for heritage funding to cover the repairs in the 2017 budget.

== Heritage listing ==
Broken Hill Synagogue was listed on the New South Wales State Heritage Register on 2 April 1999.

== See also ==
- Judaism in Australia
- History of Broken Hill
- List of synagogues in Australia
