= Dome Cinema, Worthing =

Listed building in West Sussex, England

Coordinates: 50°48′36″N 0°22′05″W

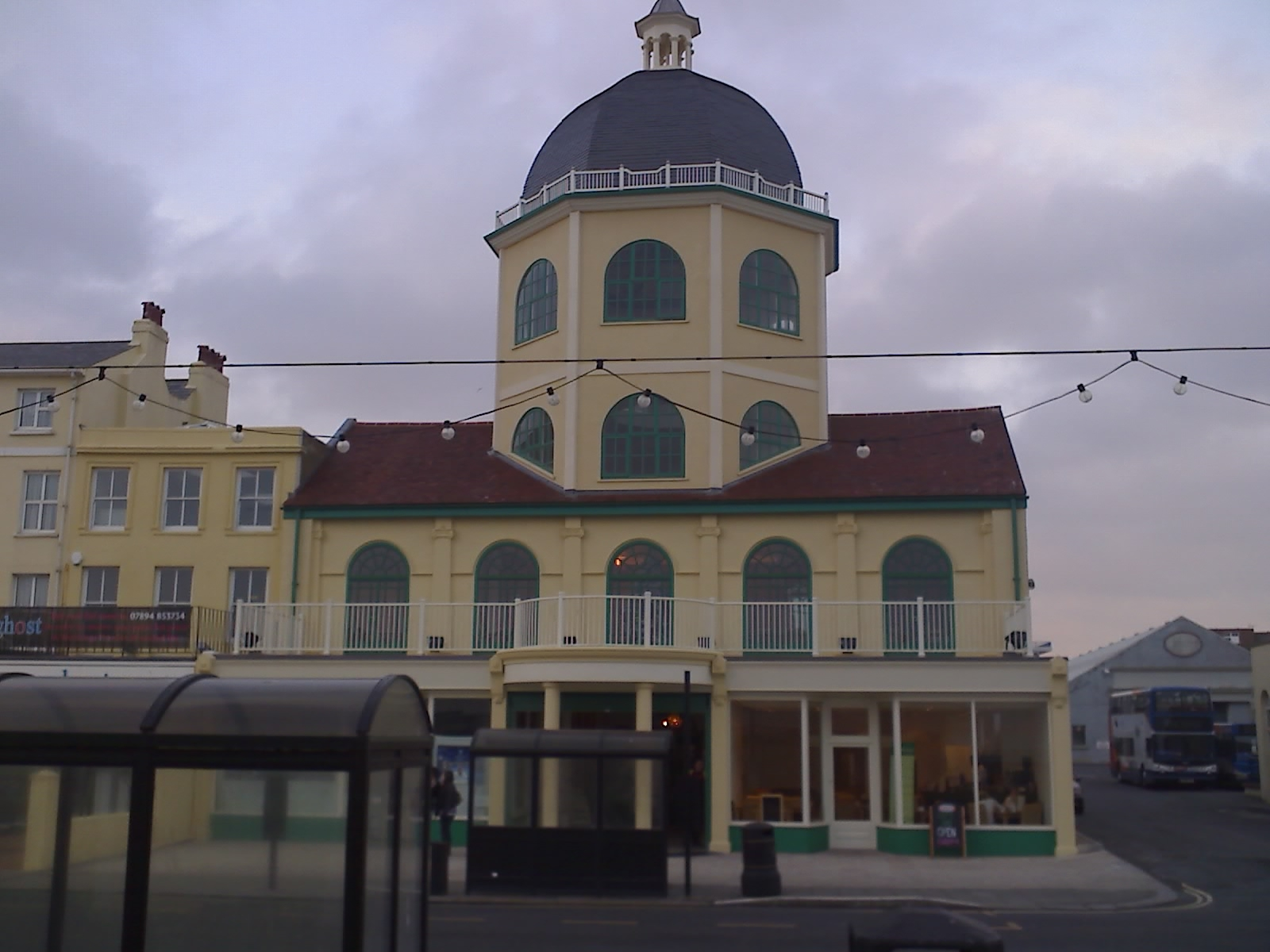

- Location within West Sussex

General information
- Architectural style: Edwardian
- Location: Worthing, West Sussex, England
- Construction started: 1910
- Completed: 1911
- Client: Carl Adolf Seebold

Design and construction
- Architect: Theophilus Arthur Allen
- Designations

Listed Building – Grade II*
- Official name: The Dome Cinema
- Designated: 31 May 1989
- Reference no.: 1250850

The Dome Cinema in Worthing, West Sussex, England, is a Grade II* listed building owned by PDJ Cinemas Ltd. The cinema, which has three screens and a Projectionist's Bar is run by PDJ Cinemas, while Alfresco Services run two function rooms and the cafe at the front of the building. It has closed for refurbishment several times, most recently between December 2005 and July 2007. The name derives from the distinctive dome on top of a three-storey tower over the entrance.

The Dome is an Edwardian building and one of the oldest working cinemas in England, and was opened in 1911 (Brighton's Duke of York's Picture House was opened in 1910). It was opened by Swiss impresario Carl Adolf Seebold. It was originally named The Kursaal — a German word translating as "cure hall". The Kursaal was used as a health centre and entertainment complex by visitors to the seaside town. At the time it contained the Coronation Hall, which was used for roller skating, exhibitions, concerts and events, and the Electric Theatre, the first cinema run for paying audiences in West Sussex.

Following the outbreak of World War I, leading residents of the town objected to the German name and after a competition with a prize of £1, the cinema was renamed "The Dome".

== Design and creation ==
=== Establishment of the Kursaal ===
Carl Adolf Seebold moved to Worthing in 1904, from Southend where his family had lived for several years. Seebold acquired the site of the future Dome in 1906.

Seebold began construction of the Kursaal in 1910, after he hired Theophilus Arthur Allen as architect for the sum of £4,000. Similar business enterprises that functioned as both health spas and entertainment complexes existed on the Continent that were also named Kursaal and Seebold, originally Swiss, was presumably aware of these and used them as a road map for his enterprise.

Seebold's Kursaal opened in 1911. At this time the site retained the extensive gardens of the previous site. Seebold's additions were the Coronation Hall, a skating rink and the Electric Theatre, which displayed short, silent cartoons. The following year Seebold added an awning to cover the garden for all weather use.

The films Seebold showed in the Electric Theatre were sufficiently profitable that he converted the Coronation Hall so that it could serve as a second cinema screen in 1913.

=== The change of name ===
World War I broke out on 28 July 1914 and after casualties began to mount the residents became increasingly anti-German. To save his successful business, Seebold held a competition in 1915 for a new name. The grand prize was £1.00. In a retrospective published by The Argus on 4 September 2003 it is stated:

The £1 prize was divided among the first four people to write in: Miss Mary Summers, of Church Walk; Mr W Tedder, of Lyndhurst Road; Miss F C Philpott, of York Road, and Thomas Chandler, of London Street.

— The Argus

== The Dome ==
It was not until long after World War I had drawn to a close in 1918 that the Dome was converted into a proper, full-time cinema. Seebold had arranged for a raked floor to be added to the Coronation Hall as a temporary measure in 1914 but it was not until 1921 that the change was made permanent when the Dome was re-modelled by architect R. Kirksby for a sum of £8,000. This area was to remain in continuous use as a cinema until the Dome was closed for refurbishment on 5 January 1999.

During the remodelling carried out by Mr Kirksby, a plaster ceiling was added to the main theatre, along with a large, wood-panelled foyer and a polygonal ticket booth that remained in the building as of 2004. It was also at this time that the Electric Theatre was converted into a ballroom.

For some years the Dome had been the centre of a controversy in that Seebold showed films on Sunday, which was considered a violation of the Sabbath. Local clergymen and town councillors had been attempting to stop this practice for some time, but Magistrates upheld Seebold's application to carry on.

=== Competition ===
It was during the 1920s that the Dome saw competition in the form of the Picturedrome, which is today known as the Connaught Theatre in Worthing. Seebold retaliated to his rival by opening the Rivoli cinema in 1924. By 1926 he owned the Picturedrome.

Seebold continued to enjoy a monopoly in the area until more cinemas opened in the 1930s. The Plaza opened in 1933 and the Odeon in 1934. In the days before television, cinema was extremely popular and the town could sustain five theatres.

=== Second World War ===
The Dome carried on, albeit in reduced circumstances, with essentially few changes until fear of German invasion in World War II caused it to briefly close. It reopened under a strict curfew and continued business, though not without incident.

A resident of Worthing recalled the following case of enemy action for a BBC history project.

I was 14 and allowed to start work. I started working as a projectionist in the cinema, as a rewind boy, like an apprentice projectionist. I was working in the Dome Cinema, right on the sea front at Worthing. On the sea front there were anti aircraft guns manned by male soldiers. Also there were ATS women that worked the telescope. It was a long horizontal one. You looked into the middle of it and could see any aircraft that was coming in. If the gunners couldn't see the planes then the ATS used to direct them.

Also I used to fire watch. I wasn't on watch every night, about every 3rd night. I was on watch one night and a bomb was dropped but it didn't explode. It went underground and partly under the cinema. Everywhere was quickly evacuated. The bomb disposal people had a job getting down to it because Worthing beach is all shingles and every time they dug down it just filled back in. They had a hell of a job shoring it up, it took them a good 2 weeks to get to the bomb and at any time it may have gone off! I didn't get 2 weeks off work though. The owner had another cinema up in the town and I went to work there.

This story was submitted to the People's War site by Jacci Phillips of the CSV Action Desk at BBC Hereford and Worcester on behalf of Fred Stamp and has been added to the site with his permission. The author fully understands the site's terms and conditions.

— BBC history project

=== Post war years ===
After the end of World War II, the Dome went into a steady decline due to heavy competition. In 1949 Seebold restructured his company and remarried. He continued to run the new business, The Rivoli and Dome Ltd, until his death in 1951. By 1955 the Dome was badly out of date and required a refit. The new owners hired architects Goldsmith and Pennells to install a new cinemascope screen. Although the rise of television and sharing the area with four other cinemas must have added financial pressure, the Dome survived to see its sister cinema, The Rivoli, burn down in 1960. One of the Dome's competitors, The Plaza, closed down in 1968.

At some point the Picturedrome had changed its name to the Connaught and served chiefly as a theatre for live performances; a role it continues today, so the Dome and the Odeon were the only full-time cinemas in Worthing by this point.

The Odeon was a multi-screen cinema and was considerably larger and more modern than either the Dome or the Connaught.

=== The redevelopment scheme ===
In 1969 Worthing Borough Council purchased the Dome as part of a much larger redevelopment scheme. Their intention was to rebuild most of the east half of Worthing town centre, starting with the north. The redevelopment scheme itself dated back to the 1940s and 1950s.

Worthing's original town hall and the Georgian Royal Theatre were amongst the buildings torn down in the first phase of this project, which cleared the way for the construction of the Guildbourne Centre.

Unfortunately for the council's plans, the Guildbourne Centre was poorly received and its design heavily criticised. The redevelopment scheme apparently stalled shortly thereafter, leaving the Dome cinema in the hands of the borough council that had declared the intention to demolish it.

The cinema remained open during this time, however, with the original building split into three parts and leased to three separate business people on a short-term basis.

Garrick House Ltd, a company based in Crewe which ran two other cinemas and one theatre elsewhere in Sussex, leased the Dome Cinema itself and continued operating it. Unfortunately the terms of the lease permitted by the council made any long-term investment in the cinema unappealing. With no-one protecting the Dome's long term interests, the cinema went into decline.

Unexpectedly, the Dome's larger, more modern rival shut down first. In 1987 the Odeon was forced to close. 25 years previously, when cinema was going through hard times, Odeon had sold a number of their cinemas on a "lease back" deal. Ironically, although the Worthing Odeon was now financially viable, the freehold owners could make more money in redeveloping the site. A fierce campaign ensued, which resulted in the Odeon being listed. However, the council managed to get the listing removed, so that the demolition for redevelopment could go ahead. During this time, a sewerage leak into the main auditorium did not help the cause. At the time, the Connaught Theatre had been closed by the council, and Odeon looked into purchasing this as an alternative, but decided the venue was not big enough. In the end, the council themselves refurbished and reopened the Connaught, after a vigorous campaign to save the venue. The Dome was suddenly the only purpose-built cinema in town again, just as it had been when it started.

The Dome also received some welcome publicity in 1987 when director David Leland decided to use the cinema as a location in his film Wish You Were Here, starring Emily Lloyd and Tom Bell.

In 1988 a structural survey commissioned by the council estimated that the Dome required £1,900,000 worth of repairs and the borough council's long dormant redevelopment scheme seemed to be underway again. However, the situation had greatly changed since the council's redevelopment plans had been redrawn at the end of the 1970s. When redevelopment had first been suggested after World War II, the Dome was forty years old. By the time of the survey it was seventy-seven years old and, in the eyes of local people, the concept of redeveloping the town centre had been discredited by the unpopular Guildbourne Centre project. Additionally, the fact that the Connaught was primarily a theatre meant that pulling down the Dome would have left Worthing, a seaside resort with approximately 100,000 residents, without a cinema. These factors lead to a grass-roots campaign to save the Dome that ran through the rest of 1988 and much of 1989.

On 27 April 1989, the borough council approved the plans of Burton Property Trust to redevelop the town centre. The Dome was one of many old buildings to be torn down, including some Grade II listed buildings. There was a public outcry at the developer's plans.

In spite of the widespread local opposition to the redevelopment, the council proceeded with their plans. In response, campaigners sent an application to the Department of the Environment to have the Dome registered as a listed building. This application was successful and the Dome became a Grade II listed building on 31 May 1989.

The campaign against redevelopment continued, with stories appearing in the national press and at least one European newspaper, until Burton Property Trust announced it was withdrawing from the scheme in September 1989.

=== The campaign to save the Dome ===
With the departure of Burton Property Trust from the situation, the question of what would happen to the Dome was again open. Several proposals were put forward but ran into planning difficulties, including some that were intended to help improve the cinema by overhauling the front and interior of the building.

Between 1989 and 1991 there were a series of planning battles between the council and conservationists, which ended when a government inspector overturned a council decision that applications to develop the area around the Dome on a piece by piece basis were premature.

On 10 March 1991, the Dome played host to the AGM of the Cinema Theatre Association. Then, in May of that year, local council elections were held resulting in the election of Ian Stuart, a former joint chairman of the Save the Dome Campaign. That month a council planning officer stated that there was no longer any intention of demolishing the Dome. Later in 1991 the Dome Preservation Trust was established to look after the long term interests of the building.

The following year trouble struck. Garrick House Ltd, the operator of the cinema, was subjected to a winding up order by the High Court on 29 January 1992. Neville Russell, a Brighton-based firm of chartered accountants, were appointed liquidators.

In February, the council put forward £110,000 towards building work that would keep the Dome watertight for the next five years. The Dome Preservation Trust was expected raise an equal amount so that the work could go ahead. At the same time, the liquidators installed Robins Cinemas as temporary managers of the Dome. Robins Cinemas operated a small chain of nine cinemas at the time and continued to run the cinema while a legal battle between the council and the liquidator over the rights to the leasehold of the Dome ran on until December 1992.

Control of the Dome was returned to the borough council on 25 March 1992. The council immediately closed the cinema over safety concerns, to the shock of local residents. Council officers estimated £100,000 would be needed to make safe the electrical wiring in the Dome, though Seeboard eventually carried out the work for £26,500, completing the work in May 1993.

Even though Robins Cinemas had been appointed to run the cinema by the liquidator, the borough council re-let the Dome to the cinema chain on a short-term lease. On 13 July 1993, the Dome held a charity showing of Jurassic Park to raise funds for the Dome Preservation Trust.

In 1994 urgent repairs were carried out to the Dome tower itself at an eventual cost of £300,000 to the council. Some of the more ornate architectural features of the Dome had been removed in the 1950s and the Dome Preservation Trust ran a campaign to raise funds so that these features could be replaced. The campaign included the creation of a new group called "Friends of the Dome", of which Professor Anthony Field CBE was the president. The campaign eventually raised over £10,000.

Even after this extensive restoration, it was estimated that work costing a further £600,000 was needed and in 1995 Worthing Borough Council decided it was time to put the freehold of the cinema on the market. The Chapman Group put in a bid with the intention of turning the Dome into a nightclub, which the council approved. In February 1996, there was a public demonstration in front of the town hall and on 4 March 1996 The Times newspaper carried a page three article under the headline "Last Reel for Britain's longest running cinema" with the byline of Marcus Binney. The magazine Private Eye also carried an article about the Dome's situation.

The publicity seemed to attract other bidders for the Dome, amongst them Eugene Chaplin (the son of Charlie Chaplin) and an unnamed consortium. In spite of the competition Chapman's bid was successful. Then it was discovered that the then Department of National Heritage had upgraded the Dome's status to Grade II*, a status only four other cinemas in Britain shared. The Electric Cinema in Portobello Road, the Scala Cinema in Ilkeston (now the Scala (club)), the Torbay Picture House in Paignton, and the Elite Cinema in Nottingham. The addition of the star to the Grade II listing meant that any future application for building work had to be considered by the Secretary of State for National Heritage.

This may have been a factor in Chapman Group's decision to announce that it was pulling out of the redevelopment of the Dome in October 1996.

In November 1997, the borough council decided to put the Dome Cinema up for sale again. The Dome Preservation Trust renamed itself the Worthing Dome and Regeneration Trust at this time and began work on a bid to buy the Dome from the council. At this time the cost of renovating the Dome was estimated at £1,000,000.

In October 1998 with the Dome still on the market, a developer proposed building a nine-screen multiplex cinema in Worthing on the site of the Teville Gate shopping centre. The trust continued with its own plans to buy the Dome and renovate it. Before the end of the year the bingo hall and the café that operated in the other two parts of the original Dome complex vacated the premises, allowing them to be reunited with the Dome itself.

By January 1999 there were four bids for the Dome Cinema. On 5 March 1999, the borough council accepted the bid from the Worthing Dome and Regeneration Trust on the condition that their applications for funding from English Heritage and the National Lottery were successful, but on 5 April 1999 the council closed the Dome for reasons of health and safety. After eighty-eight years the Dome was the longest continuously running cinema in the United Kingdom and the only full-time cinema in Worthing.

=== The restoration of the Dome ===
The Heritage Lottery Fund approved the Worthing Dome and Regeneration Trust's application in early October. The story was carried in the local press and allowed the purchase of the freehold from the borough council to go ahead. On 9 November 1999, the trust paid the council a nominal fee of £10 and took possession of the cinema.

A grant of £20,000 was made to carry out preliminary work on the building, much of which was done by unpaid volunteers. This allowed the Dome Cinema to reopen on 17 December 1999 with a special showing of the 1957 film The Smallest Show on Earth, appropriately a comedy about the owner of a troubled small cinema. The reopening was covered by the local press.

The Heritage Lottery Fund was willing to put up £1,750,000 for the complete restoration of the Dome but only on the condition that the trust raised £500,000 itself first to demonstrate sufficient local interest to make the project worthwhile. The trust launched an appeal to raise the money. The appeal continued to run while the Dome Cinema was open for business but in September 2001 the local press reported that the completion date for the £2.5 million renovation had been put back by two years from 31 December 2003 to 31 December 2005. By February 2002 it was reported that the Worthing Dome and Regeneration Trust only needed to raise £250,000 to unlock the £2.5 million available from the Heritage Lottery Fund. However, on 27 November 2002 it was reported that the trust in fact needed £300,000 but had only managed to raise £75,000. The deadline for raising it had been extended from 31 December 2002 to 31 December 2004.

On 20 November 2002, the trust opened a second theatre in the area that had housed the original cinema screen when Seebold originally opened the Kursaal in 1911. In honour of the original Electric Theatre, the new theatre retains its name.

The Heritage Lottery Fund eventually released the money to the Worthing Dome and Regeneration Trust in October 2003.

The cinema continued to remain open while restoration work was carried out for as long as possible, continuing to show films throughout 2004. On 23 January 2005 Griffin, an independent film by a local director, premiered at the Dome in a gala night that was covered by the local press.

The cinema continued normal business until December 2005 when the major work of restoration began and the Dome was closed again. It reopened on 6 July 2007 after extensive building work.

=== The Dome Cinema – 2007 to present ===
Since the reopening in 2007, The Dome Cinema has continued to run as a successful, fully independent cinema (run entirely separately to the, formerly, Worthing Borough Council owned Connaught Theatre). The projection ran on two 35mm Cinemeccanica projectors (a Victoria 8 in Screen 1 and a Victoria 5 in Screen 2) until October & November 2012, when both screens were converted to fully digital. Screen 1 now runs on a NEC 2000C, Screen 2 on a NEC 1200C and Screen 3 runs a Barco DP2K-6E. The last 35mm film played in Screen 1 was Looper, and the first digital film was Skyfall. The Victoria 8 Cinemeccanica projector from Screen 1 is now on display in their Projectionist's Bar.

In 2015, the video for the James Bond-themed song ‘Destiny’ recorded by Francon, featuring vocals by Keith Pemberton, was filmed using parts of the interior of the Dome Cinema, Worthing.

Before adding a third screen in 2018, the Dome was one of the busiest two-screen cinemas in the country.

The cinema runs a range of different shows for the local area. Currently running are Weekend Morning Movies, Parent & Baby Screenings, Autistic Screenings, Disability Screenings, Midweek Matinees and subtitled screenings. They also run occasional live broadcasts.

The poem Seat M14 by Iain Cameron Williams published in his book The Empirical Observations of Algernon [vol. I], (June 2019), documents the writer's encounter with a ghostly (apparition) at the Dome Cinema, in April 2018 while he was sitting in the seat next to seat M14 watching a film.

The primary viewing screen and lobby area of the Dome are featured in a scene in season 6 episode 3 of the Netflix television series Black Mirror, "Beyond the Sea".

== See also ==
- Grade II* listed buildings in West Sussex
