= James Coutts Michie =

Scottish painter (1859–1919)

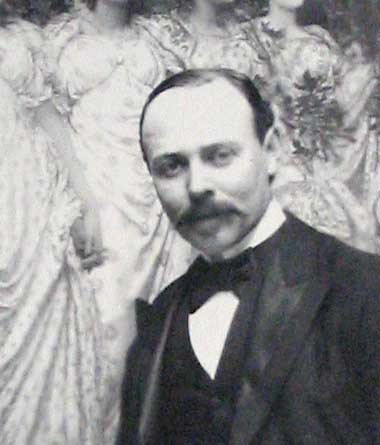
James Coutts Michie

James Coutts Michie ARSA (19 July 1859 – 18 December 1919) was a Scottish painter who specialised in landscapes and portraits.

== Overview ==
He was born James Michie at Marywell in the parish of Birse near Aboyne, Scotland, the third son of a merchant, Harry Michie, and Elizabeth Coutts, who had eleven children. He studied under Joseph Farquharson at the Trustee Academy in Edinburgh and later with Carolus-Duran in Paris. He travelled in France, Italy, Spain, Morocco, living in Tangier for several years before settling in England about 1893. Several of his paintings are in the Aberdeen Art Gallery. Amongst these is a painting of Elizabeth Crombie Duthie (1885) who in 1883 gave Duthie Park to the city of Aberdeen in memory of her uncle and brother. Coutts Michie was a member of the Aberdeen Artist's Society and the Society of Scottish Artists. Later he became an adviser to the collector George McCulloch and married his widow, Mary, in 1908. In 1910 they had a country house built at Haslemere in Surrey which they named Oak Hall. Later Oak Hall, which is now a Grade II listed building, became the Wispers School for Girls which closed in 2008 and has been converted into retirement apartments.

McCulloch's art collection included a number of paintings by Coutts Michie, Home from the Hill, now in the Broken Hill Art Gallery NSW, Portrait of Mrs George McCulloch, Harvest, Autumn Sunshine, and a sketch of Mrs Alexander McCulloch.

At the time of his death on 18 December 1919 Coutts Michie was living at Oak Hall in Haslemere, England. Buried Brookwood Cemetery.

Mary, his widow, donated a portrait of Coutts Michie by John Pettie to the Aberdeen Art Gallery in 1920. The image above is part of a larger photograph showing Coutts Michie seated on the edge of a table in front of a large painting The Daphnephoria by Lord Leighton.

Coutts Michie's sister Mary Michie was a watercolourist, flower painter and art teacher; she lived and worked mostly in Aberdeen.

== Timeline ==
- 1882 Awarded Travelling Scholarship by Royal Scottish Academy
- 1888 'Autumn Landscape' and the 'Snake Charmer' exhibited
- 1890 Exhibited at the Grosvenor Gallery
- 1893 At meeting of the Royal Scottish Academy J Coutts Michie elected Associate
- 1894 Member of hanging committee, Walker Art Gallery
- 1895 'The Moor' exhibited at 69th annual exhibition of the Royal Scottish Academy
- 1896 Exhibited 'When the Sun is Low' at the 70th annual exhibition of the Royal Scottish Academy
- 1898 'Portrait of ex Provost Sir William Henderson of Aberdeen' exhibited at 72nd annual exhibition of the Royal Scottish Academy
- 1899 Exhibited at 73rd annual exhibition
- 1899 At meeting of the Society of Oil Painters at Picadilly J Coutts Michie elected
- 1904 Exhibited at the Royal Academy
- 1905 Treasurer - Robert Brough Art Scholarship in memory of Robert Brough ARSA who was killed in the Midland Scotch express accident in January 1905. The express had run into the back of a mail train in fog and caught fire.
- 1908 On the organising committee of the Franco British Exhibition
- 1910 Exhibited at the Royal Academy
- 1911 Helped organise with many others British Art for the Rome Exhibition
- 1916 Presented to Queen Alexandra when she visited the Michie Hospital at 184 Queens Gate
- 1919 Death announcement in The Times

== More paintings ==
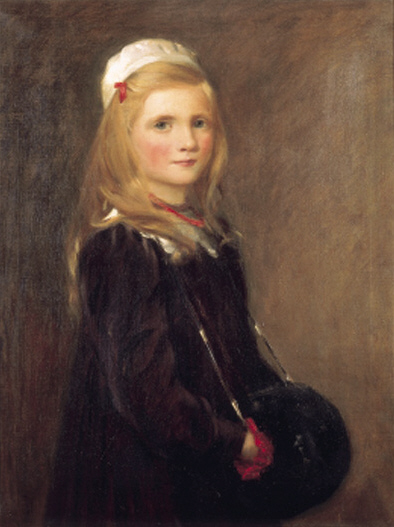
Elsie May Marquis (attrib.)

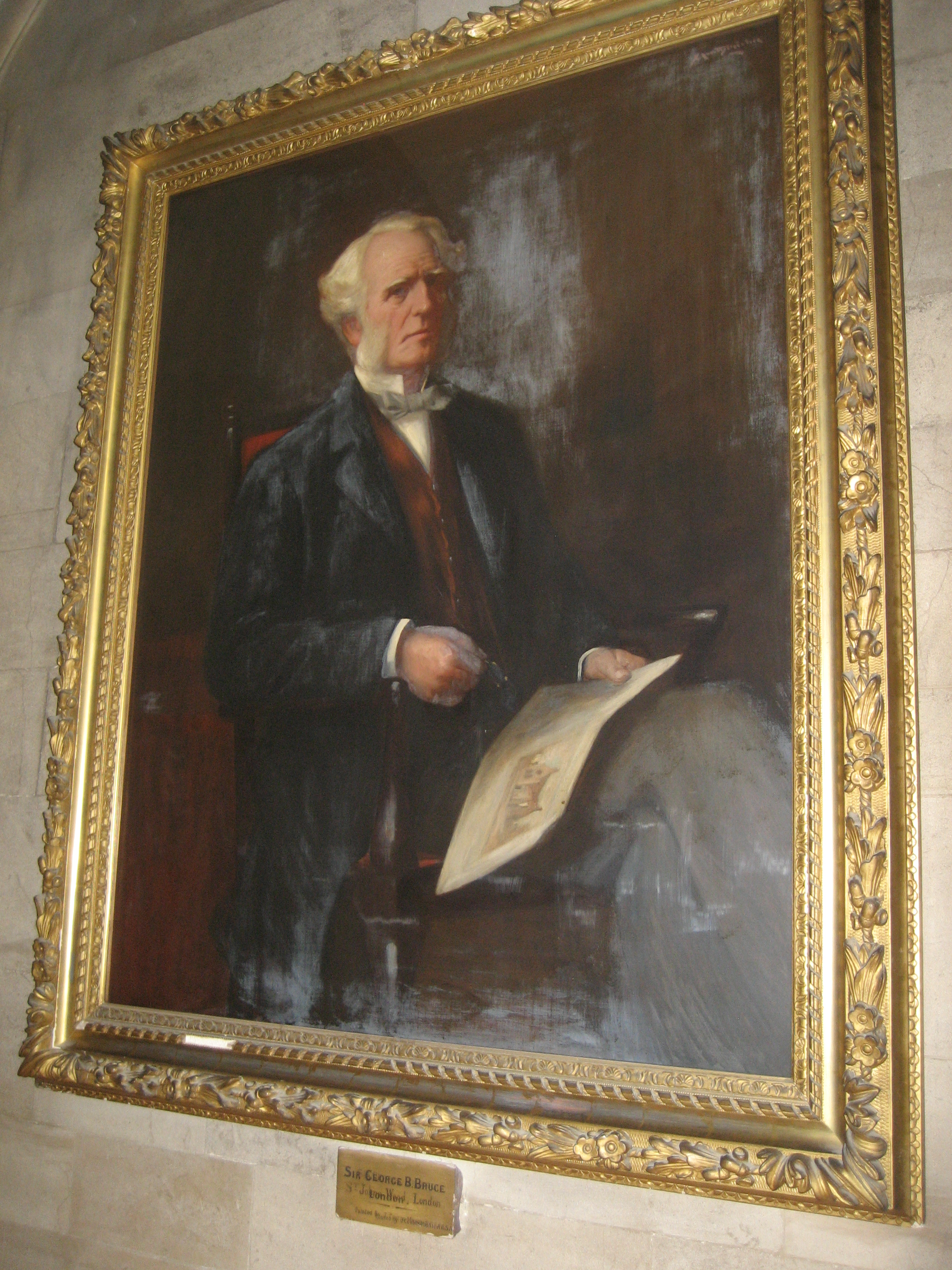
George B. Bruce

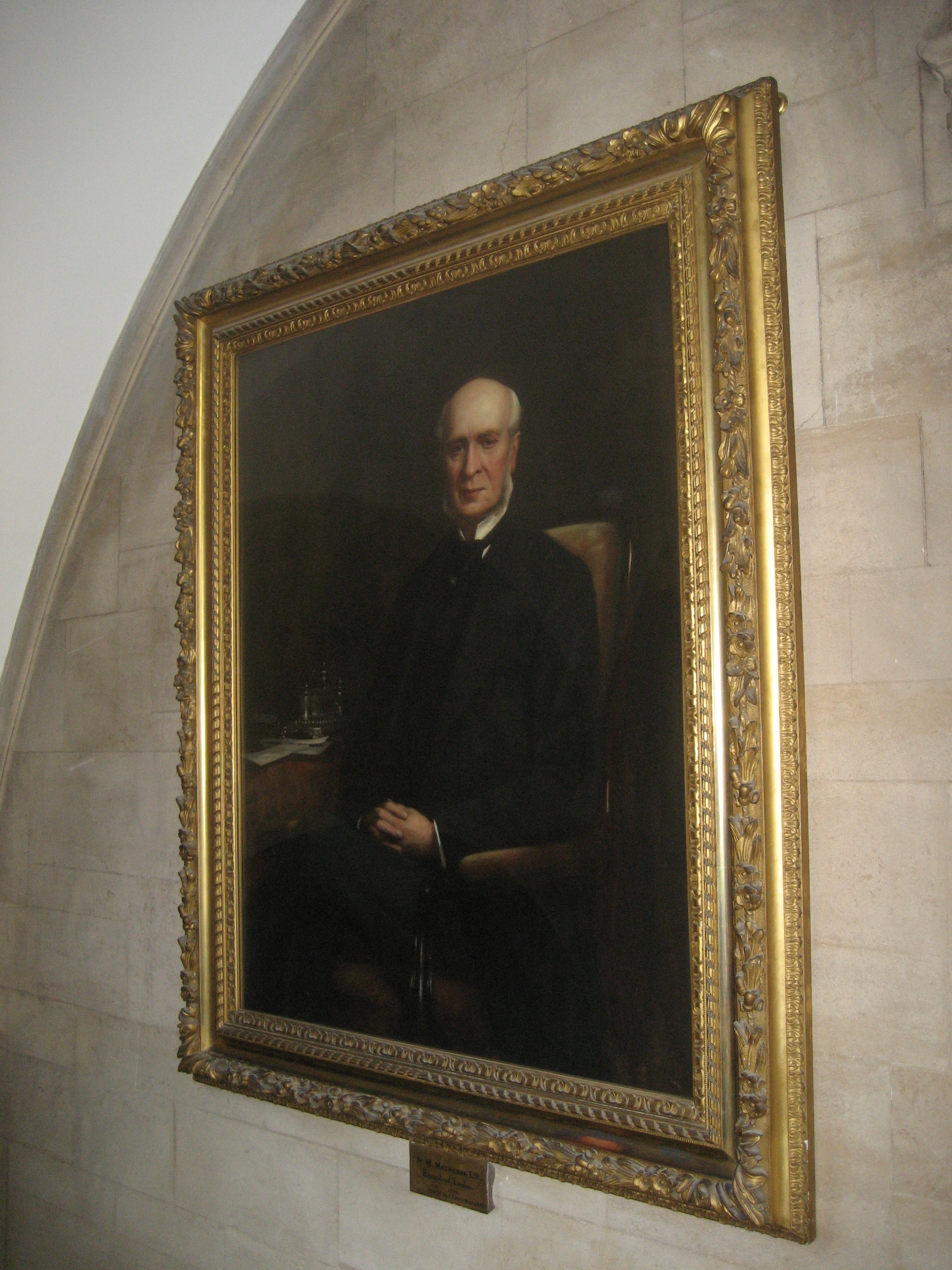
Hugh Mackay Matheson

- A Marshland Farm, Nottingham Castle Museum and Art Gallery
- At Eventide, Aberdeen Art Gallery
- Autumn Landscape, Wolverhampton Art Gallery
- Autumn Shadows, Aberdeen Art Gallery
- Charles Gordon 1847 – 1937, Marquis of Huntly, Kings Museum, University of Aberdeen
- Elizabeth Crombie Duthie of Ruthrieston, 1885, Aberdeen Art Gallery
- George Barclay Bruce, St John's Wood, London, Westminster College, Cambridge
- Girl in a Cottage Interior, 1877, Aberdeen Art Gallery
- Hugh Mackay Matheson, Westminster College, Cambridge
- Home from the Hills, Broken Hill Art Gallery
- Mountain Landscape with a Lake, Victoria Art Gallery, Bath
- Old Aberdeen from the South-West, ex 1893, Aberdeen Art Gallery
- Reverend David Brown, d 1897, Kings Museum, University of Aberdeen
- Sir David Murray RA, 1897, Aberdeen Art Gallery
- Sir John McFadyean LLD, abt 1907, Royal College of Veterinary Science
- Snow Scene, abt 1905, Art Gallery of New South Wales
- Street in Tangier, Aberdeen Art Gallery
- Winter in Surrey, Walker Art Gallery, Liverpool
- Winter Scene, Wolverhampton Art Gallery
- Woman with Pigeon, 1887/89, Angus Council
- A Young Fisherman, 1880
- A Glade in a Birch Wood, 1894
- Normandy Orchard, 1885

== Appreciation ==
His landscape paintings mostly appear to lack the detail of some Scottish painters of his time such as James Guthrie who painted 'To Pastures New', but the portrait of his friend Sir David Murray radiates warmth and is charming. That said, he contributed to the world of art in other ways by helping to organize exhibitions both at home and abroad.
