= Carl Adolf Seebold =

Swiss businessman (1873–1951)

- Born: 1873; Zürich, Switzerland
- Died: 1951 (aged 77–78); Worthing, West Sussex, England
- Occupation: Impresario
- Spouse: Married

Carl Adolf Seebold (1873–1951) was a Swiss impresario who commissioned and ran the Dome Cinema in the English coastal town of Worthing in West Sussex.

Swiss-born Seebold was the son of a rope manufacturer from Zürich. The father fell on hard times and turned to entertainment, playing the guitar and singing, to support a large family of nine sons and four daughters. A violinist, Seebold became leader of his family's Swiss band, the Chamounix Orchestra in 1897. The Orchestra toured widely and were invited to play before many of the royal households of Europe. They were invited to England by Sir Alfred Butt, appearing at The Crystal Palace, Queen's Hall and various resorts, including Worthing.

Between 1900 and 1903, Seebold and his family had been lessees at Southend Pier.

In October 1904, Seebold settled in Worthing, and was the proprietor of the town's New Theatre Royal in Bath Place. He lived at Bedford House, on the town's seafront. In 1909, Seebold built the entertainment centre known as the Kursaal (later the Dome) in the lawns of Bedford House. Seebold later moved out of Bedford House to 52 Richmond Road in Worthing.

In 1924, Seebold opened the Rivoli cinema, also in Worthing and in 1926 he acquired a rival cinema, the Picturedrome. In 1949, Seebold founded The Rivoli and Dome Ltd and married for a second time.

Seebold died in 1951.
