= Michie Hospital =

Former hospital

Coordinates: 51.5000°N 0.1797°W

The Michie Hospital was a Voluntary Aid Detachment hospital set up during the First World War at 184 Queens Gate, London, England to treat wounded soldiers. The hospital was opened in 1916 by Queen Alexandra. The house was loaned by Mrs Mary Michie, who was an administrator at the hospital. She was the widow of George McCulloch and had married, thirdly, the Scottish painter James Coutts Michie. The surgeon Lawrie Hugh McGavin worked at the hospital. It closed in June 1919.
