= Theophilus Arthur Allen =

British architect

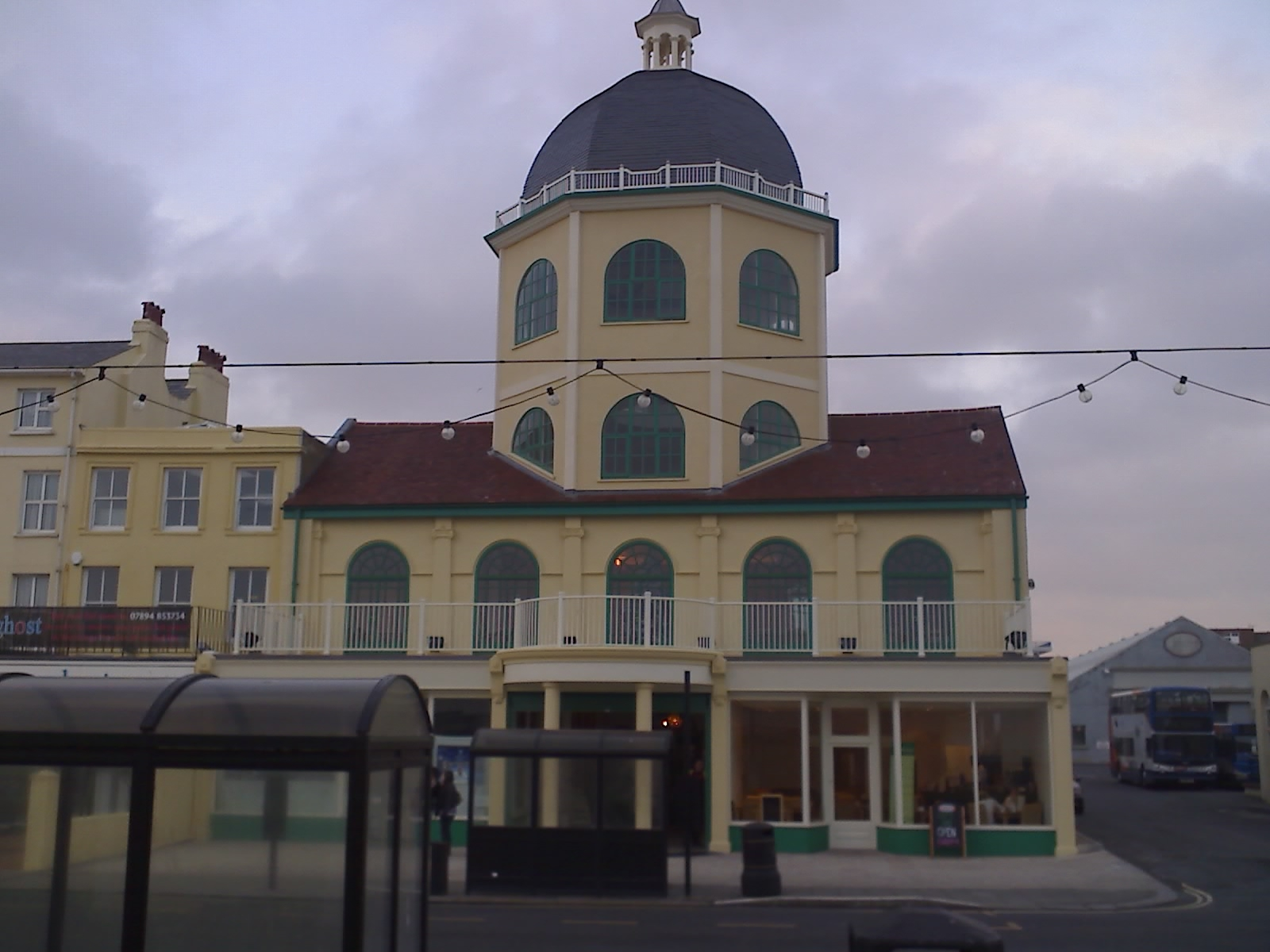
Dome Cinema, Worthing, 2008

Theophilus Arthur Allen, FRIBA (1846–1929) was a British architect, probably best known for the Grade II* listed Dome Cinema, Worthing.

From 1880 to 1884, he was in partnership with John Mackland.

== Notable buildings ==
- Dome Cinema, Worthing (1911), Grade II* listed
- Oak Hall, Haslemere (1911), Grade II listed in 2010
- Kenwood, St. George's Hill (1913)
