= George McCulloch (mine owner) =

British businessman (1848–1907)

George McCulloch

George McCulloch (23 April 1848, in Glasgow – 12 December 1907, in London) was a Scottish businessman and art collector who was the mastermind behind the formation of the Broken Hill Mining Company, a precursor of BHP. He was the son of James McCulloch, a contractor, and Isabella Robertson, a farmer's daughter. George's father died of cholera in January 1849 when George was one year old, and he was brought up by his mother, who was assisted by his uncle John Robertson, a farmer.

== Early life and shipbuilding ==
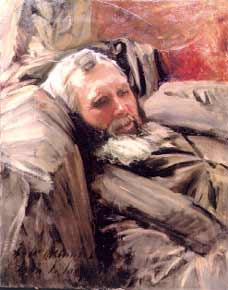
George McCulloch, John Singer Sargent, 1901

As a young man, circa 1865, McCulloch travelled to Uruguay, South America where his older brothers, John and Allan, were stockmen. At age 21, he returned to Glasgow and, in 1869, formed a partnership with James Patterson, leasing a shipyard at Port Glasgow. McCulloch Patterson and Co., shipbuilders, built several vessels, including the Isabel, Vale of Doon, Loch Dee, Vale of Nith, Firth of Clyde, Maitland, and the Loch Urr, though they made a small loss on most of these vessels; the pair were eventually forced to file for bankruptcy in February 1871.

== Sheep farming in Australia ==
In May 1871 McCulloch sailed for Melbourne, Australia, where his cousin, Sir James McCulloch, was a prosperous merchant and politician.

About 1875, his cousin gave him a job as manager of the Mount Gipps Sheep Station in New South Wales, which extended to approximately 400,000 acres of land leased from the government. George was also given a 1/8 share in the Mount Gipps Pastoral and Mineral Company by McCulloch Sellar and Co., in which James McCulloch was a partner.

== The Broken Hill Mine ==
By chance, in 1883, his boundary rider Charles Rasp discovered mineral samples on the property and pegged out a claim. McCulloch immediately held a meeting with the station hands at which they agreed to form a Syndicate of Seven, pegging out a further six blocks of mining leases which were amalgamated to form the privately owned Broken Hill Mining Company. In 1885, silver was discovered and, in order to bring in more capital for the development of the mine, the original company was floated into BHP.

A famous story tells how McCulloch played a game of cards with Alfred Cox, a visitor from England, in order to decide the price for one of his one-fourteenth shares in BHP. McCulloch was asking £150, and Cox bid £120, and it was resolved the winner of two of three games of euchre should have his price. The game, played at Mount Gipps station, and witnessed by members of the syndicate, went to Cox, who thus got for £120 shares which six years later would be worth over a million.

== Art collection ==
George McCulloch retired to the UK a rich man, about 1891. He married his housekeeper, Mary Agnes Mayger, the widow of an employee at Mount Gipps, in 1893, and they went to live at 184 Queens Gate, London.

Between 1893 and his death, in 1907, George became an internationally known art collector and was a patron of the artist John Singer Sargent. At the time of his death, he owned one of the finest collections of paintings by modern British artists in the world. He made it his rule not to acquire a picture unless it was painted in his own lifetime.

An authoritative, well-illustrated text book about the McCulloch collection was published in 2018 by George McCulloch's biographer, Lawrence Robert McCallum (see references).

McCulloch died in 1907, the year before his son Alexander McCulloch won a silver medal in the Single Sculls at the 1908 London Summer Olympic Regatta.

George's widow, Agnes, married the Scottish painter James Coutts Michie in 1908. In 1909, the McCulloch Collection of Modern Art was exhibited at the Royal Academy Winter Exhibition at Burlington House. The bulk of the collection was sold by auction in 1913, with many pictures being purchased by Viscount Lever.

McCulloch's house at Queens Gate was used as a British Red Cross Voluntary Aid Detachment hospital during the Great War when it became known as the Michie Hospital.

For her war work, McCulloch's widow, Agnes Coutts Michie, received the CBE in 1920. In 1928, she donated a painting of George McCulloch by artist Barnett Samuel Marks to the Broken Hill Art Gallery.
