= Angela Lambert =

British journalist, art critic, and author (1940–2007)

- Born: Angela Maria Helps; 14 April 1940
- Died: 26 September 2007 (aged 67)
- Education: Wispers School; St Hilda's College
- Occupations: Journalist, art critic and author
- Spouse: Martin Lambert (m. 1962–1967)
- Partner: Tony Price
- Children: 3
- Writing career
- Language: English
- Period: 1969–2006

Angela Maria Lambert (née Helps; 14 April 1940 – 26 September 2007) was a British journalist, art critic and author. She is best known for her novels A Rather English Marriage and Kiss and Kin, the latter of which won the Romantic Novel of the Year Award.

== Biography ==
Lambert was born Angela Maria Helps to an English civil servant and a German-born housewife. She was unhappy when sent to Wispers School, a girls' boarding school in Sussex, where by the age of 12 she had decided that she wanted to be a writer. She went to St Hilda's College, Oxford, where she read politics, philosophy and economics.

In 1962, she married Martin Lambert, they had a son and a daughter, and the union ended five years later, when he left her with two young children to support. Later she also had another daughter with the Hungarian-born writer Stephen Vizinczey.

She began her career as a journalist in 1969, working for ITN before joining The Independent newspaper in 1988.

Lambert suffered multiple immune disorders and hepatitis C (caught from a blood transfusion) which led to cirrhosis of the liver. Having survived a critical illness in February 2006, she never quite recovered, and became increasingly disabled. She lived in London and France (having bought a house in the Dordogne in 1972). She was survived by her partner of 21 years, television director Tony Price, and her three children.

== Selected Works ==
=== Novels ===
- Love Among the Single Classes (1989)
- No Talking After Lights (1990)
- A Rather English Marriage (1992)
- The Constant Mistress (1994)
- Kiss and Kin (1997)
- Golden Lads and Girls (1999)
- The Property of Rain (2001)

=== Non-fiction ===
- Unquiet Souls: The Indian Summer of the British Aristocracy, 1880-1918 (1984)
  - US edition: Unquiet Souls: A Social History of the Illustrious, Irreverent, Intimate Group of British Aristocrats Known as The Souls (1984)
- 1939: The Last Season of Peace (1989)
- The Lost Life of Eva Braun (2006)
