= Lawrie Hugh McGavin =

British surgeon (1868–1932)

Lawrie Hugh McGavin CBE FRCS (1868 – 31 October 1932) was a British surgeon.

McGavin was the son of John McGavin of Calcutta. He was educated at Fettes College and the Royal Military College, Sandhurst. Commissioned into the 6th Dragoon Guards, he was promoted lieutenant in July 1890, but resigned his commission in October 1892 and the following year began medical training at Guy's Hospital. His first post was as assistant surgeon at the London North-Western Hospital, and he later obtained posts as a surgeon at the King George Hospital and the Endsleigh Hospital for Officers, before being appointed consulting surgeon to the Dreadnought Hospital in Greenwich and the Hospital for Women. During the First World War he worked at the Michie Hospital and the Farnborough Court Hospital, for which he was appointed Commander of the Order of the British Empire (CBE) in January 1920. He was also a member of the Emergency Surgical Aid Corps. In the 1920s he perfected the process of silver filagree gauze for the treatment of hernia and performed the operation on both Gandhi and the King of Siam.

In 1892 he married the Australian Edith Mary Beauchamp.
