= Mary Coutts Michie =

Domestic worker and hospital administrator

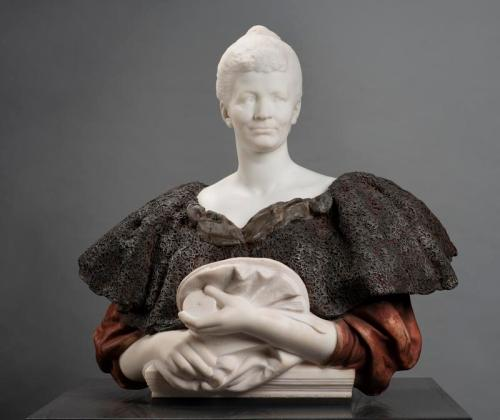
Marble portrait, ca.1890, by Alfred Gilbert

Mary Agnes Coutts Michie, OBE (February 1857 – 29 November 1945) was founder and administrator of the World War I Michie Hospital, and an art collector and benefactor.

== Early life ==
Smith was born in Nottingham in February 1857, and emigrated to Australia at the age of 12, on The Southern Belle landing in Brisbane, Queensland.

She married James Magyer at Burra, South Australia and as Mary Agnes Mayger, she and her husband were employed at Mount Gipps Station, near Broken Hill. Mount Gipps was managed by George McCulloch, a founder of the Syndicate of Seven in 1883, and Director of the Broken Hill Mining Company formed in 1855.

Her first husband died at Sydney in 1892 and in 1893 she married George McCulloch in London.

== Art collection ==
During her marriage to George McCulloch the couple developed a significant collection of artworks. In 1894 they built a house at No. 184 Queen's Gate, London which housed these works.

Following McCulloch's death in 1907, Mary married third the Scottish artist James Coutts Michie in 1909 who had been an art adviser to the couple. An exhibition of the McCulloch Collection of Modern Art was shown at Burlington House in 1909, as the Royal Academy Winter Exhibition.

In 1919 her third husband died and a portion of the McCulloch collection was sold.

In 1928 she gifted paintings to the Broken Hill Art Gallery and to the Art Gallery of South Australia, including a portrait of George McCulloch painted by James Coutts Michie.

== Wartime service ==
During World War I Coutts Michie provided her home as a British Red Cross Voluntary Aid Detachment Hospital which was known as the Michie Hospital, or the Queen's Gate Hospital.

In retirement Coutts Michie lived in a house known as 'Broken Hill,' in Cobham, Surrey. She died on 29 November 1945 at the age of 88 years.
