= Leave Us Kids Alone =

UK television series

Leave Us Kids Alone was a TV series made by Twenty-Twenty Television and distributed by Outright Distribution. It involved 10 one-hour episodes (together with 7 half-hour "up close and personal" shows) and was originally shown on BBC Three in October 2007.

== Description ==
The series involved 12 opinionated teens who were required to prove that they could successfully run a school without adult teachers. It was seen as a social experiment, as the group of twelve teenagers were expected to act as teachers. It was an aspiration of each member to undertake such a task, but the producers had created a challenge for each 'teacher', one which proved difficult from the start. The filming took place at Wispers School in Haslemere, Surrey and lasted for 3 weeks.

The show depicted the struggles the teenagers went through to keep their cool teaching a class, and featured clips of the teens living under the same roof. The experiment was structured in a way that forced the new teachers into cooperation with each other, creating a team out of a collection of strangers. Throughout the series, effects of the experiment were shown, and many social issues came into play. Throughout the course of schooling, a professional school inspector was asked to oversee the proceedings, taking note of the teen's progress and ability.

At the conclusion of the programme, the teachers had failed 2 inspections, but seemed to have improved greatly from their previous selves, completing the experiment and bringing the series to a close.

The Teachers:

- Tom Aston
- Hannah Couchman
- Rosanna Eaton
- Sam Smithson
- Shana Dalley
- Jordan Smith
- Jenni Pass
- Bilal Ayonoate
- Frankie Bellingham
- Liam Collwick-Jones
- Leigh Ellwood
- Natasha Brown
