= A Rather English Marriage =

1992 novel by Angela Lambert

- First edition
- Author: Angela Lambert
- Language: English
- Genre: Novel
- Publisher: Hamish Hamilton
- Publication date: 10 December 1992
- Publication place: United Kingdom
- Media type: Print (Hardcover)
- Pages: 288 pp
- ISBN: 0-241-13164-2
- OCLC: 27136211
- Dewey Decimal: 823/.914 20
- LC Class: PR6062.A467 R38 1992

A Rather English Marriage is a novel by Angela Lambert, first published in 1992, and later adapted for television by Andrew Davies for the BBC.

== Plot summary ==
The book's plot concerns two retired men who are thrown together following the deaths of their wives in the same hospital. Both served in the armed forces, Reggie Conyngham-Jervis having been an officer, and Roy Southgate an ex-NCO. The class differences lead to Roy moving in with Reggie and being treated as an unpaid servant. The reader's sympathies are with Roy as he remains humble and faithful to his purpose until Reggie becomes too domineering. Roy remarries, and Reggie, whose attempt to seduce a younger widow, Liz Franks, ends in failure, is left alone.

== Television adaptation ==
DVD release

The television adaptation, first screened on BBC Two on 30 December 1998 and later released on DVD, is directed by Paul Seed. It stars Tom Courtenay as Roy and Albert Finney as Reggie, and stays close to the plot of the book until the ending, when the two old men end up staying together. The adaptation also starred Joanna Lumley as Liz, Ursula Howells as Reggie's wife, Mary, and Jeremy Clyde as Reggie's nephew.

The show won the BAFTA Awards for Best Actor (Tom Courtenay), Best Editing, Best Original Television Music and Best Single Drama. It also received nominations for Best Actor (Albert Finney), Best Actress (Joanna Lumley) and Best Sound.

It also received the Peabody Award and the Royal Television Society Award for Best Single Drama.
