= Wispers =

Country house in West Sussex, England

- Location within West Sussex
- 51°00′55″N 0°46′25″W
- Location: Stedham with Iping
- OS grid reference: SU 86035 24665

History
- Built: 1874–1876

Site notes
- Area: West Sussex
- Architect: Richard Norman Shaw
- Architectural style: Tudor Revival

Listed Building – Grade II
- Official name: St Cuthman’s School, Wispers (St Cuthman’s School)
- Designated: 18 June 1959
- Reference no.: 1275483

Wispers is a Grade II listed British country house in the parish of Stedham with Iping near Midhurst, West Sussex. The house was built in 1874–1876 by architect Richard Norman Shaw, in the Tudor Revival style, more commonly known as "Mock Tudor". It has been added to considerably since. It was a private house from its construction until 1939; from 1939 onwards it has housed several schools.

== Private house ==
"By Norman Shaw, 1876, before he started to design in the pretty tile-hung style associated with him. Not very good, and really hardly distinguishable from the standard large Victorian house. Stone ground floor, ornate half-timbering and gables above; limp and mechanical, without any of the picturesqueness his compositions of the 1870s sometimes have. The best thing is the site - high above a steep wooded valley with big views S."

The house was built in 1874-1876 by architect Richard Norman Shaw for Alexander Scrimgeour, a stockbroker. Architectural historians Nikolaus Pevsner and Ian Nairn were underwhelmed by the house: they called it "heavy and hearty", "not very good" and "limp and mechanical", adding that the best thing about Wispers is the site.

In 1892 Scrimgeour's widow, Anne Esther Scrimgeour, died, and her will showed that she owned Wispers along with other properties in the area.

In 1928 Wispers and its estate was bought by the Bedford Estate for Dame Mary Russell, the wife of Herbrand Russell, 11th Duke of Bedford. Russell used Wispers as a weekend retreat: she was a keen aviator and flew her Tiger Moth from the family seat at Woburn Abbey to Wispers, where she had a hangar constructed in the 1930s at the same time as the large eastern wing was being added to the house. She used a nearby field as a landing strip. The Duchess was killed in a flying accident in 1937, and the house was sold in 1939.

== First school at the site ==
The first school was established at the property in 1939. The hangar that the Duchess had built for her plane was converted into the school gymnasium.

== Wispers School ==
A new girls' boarding secondary school moved to the site in 1947. The school was part of Herries School at Cookham Dean in Berkshire, and was initially known as Herries School at Wispers. It was renamed Wispers School for the start of the autumn term 1949, taking its name from the house. The school remained here for nine years until it moved to a new site at West Dean House in 1956.

== St Cuthman's School/West Sussex Council ==
St Cuthman's School was established at Wispers in 1956 or 1957, when the Wispers estate was bought by West Sussex County Council who ran a mixed-sex boarding school there for children aged from 7 to 16 with special needs. During its life it was known both as St Cuthman's Special School (i.e. in 1968 it is referred to by this name in official documents) and as St Cuthman's School. It closed on 31 August 2004, with 54 pupils on the roster.

After closure, the house was sold by the Council and a planning application lodged to convert the main house into 7 flats with other buildings on the estate being either converted or demolished. The 35-acre estate was for sale under the name of St Cuthmans, and comprised Wispers, a pair of traditional cottages, a former coach house, a farm house, a stone and brick barn and a pair of 1970s cottages.

== Durand Academy ==
The house lay empty for 6 years, and was sold in April 2010 for £3 million (against an original asking price of £4.5 million) with 20 of the original 35 acres to Durand primary school, near Brixton, South London. Renamed Durand Academy, the school aimed to use Wispers as a weekly boarding environment for secondary age pupils, funding the purchase from the profits from its successful leisure and student accommodation business. In 2010 Durand applied for a £25 million grant from central Government to develop the site.

In May 2011 it was announced that the Government committed up to £17.34 million towards the capital costs; the remainder being found by the school. Durand will fund the furnishing of the middle school and will pay for the construction of sixth form accommodation for older children. It was hoped that the first pupils would start to arrive from September 2012; however in April 2013 the Academy had still not opened, with the National Trust expressing doubts about the development's environmental impact in an Area of Outstanding Natural Beauty; some residents in the area opposing its opening; and queries over the funding: "Opponents of the scheme, who have consulted Melvyn Roffe, headmaster of a state boarding school in Norfolk, argue that the school's financial estimates are unrealistically low or to quote Roffe, talking to the Independent, "ludicrous". Margaret Hodge, chair of the public accounts committee, has asked the National Audit Office to investigate the DoE's "investment decision" and the basis upon which the £17 million grant was made."

In December 2013 planning permission for the development of the site was refused. The South Downs National Park Authority successfully argued that the 375-pupil Durand Academy was too big and its impact on the landscape would be "inappropriate".

in 2019, after increasing losses, the building was sold and the Trust wrote off £1.6 million that it had spent on lease adjustments and furniture and fittings.
