= Van Gogh Primary =

School in Stockwell, London

Location
- Hackford Road; Stockwell; London, SW9 0RD; England
- Coordinates: 51°28′29″N 0°06′57″W

Information
- Type: Academy
- Local authority: Lambeth
- Department for Education URN: 146368 Tables
- Ofsted: Reports
- Head of School: Mrs Nadine Bernard
- Gender: Coeducational
- Age: 3 to 11
- Enrolment: 987
- Website: www.vangoghprimary.org.uk

Van Gogh Primary is a coeducational primary school operated by Dunraven Educational Trust and located in the Stockwell area of the London Borough of Lambeth, England. The school is based over two sites, on Hackford Road and Cowley Road.

Originally known as Durand Primary School, it became Durand Academy in 2010. The school then became an all-through school for pupils aged 2 to 16. After a protracted period of financial and legal controversy in 2018 the school once again became a primary school and was renamed Van Gogh Primary.

== History ==
Durant Primary School was a Victorian ‘triple-decker’ constructed following the Elementary Education Act 1870 (sometimes referred to as The Forster Act) which provided primary education for all children aged five to 13. It was one of 62 primary schools extant in the London Borough of Lambeth built in the residential district of Stockwell, between Liberty Street and Hackford Road. Vincent van Gogh lived on Hackford Street in 1873-4 and has given his name to a local street and the successor school.

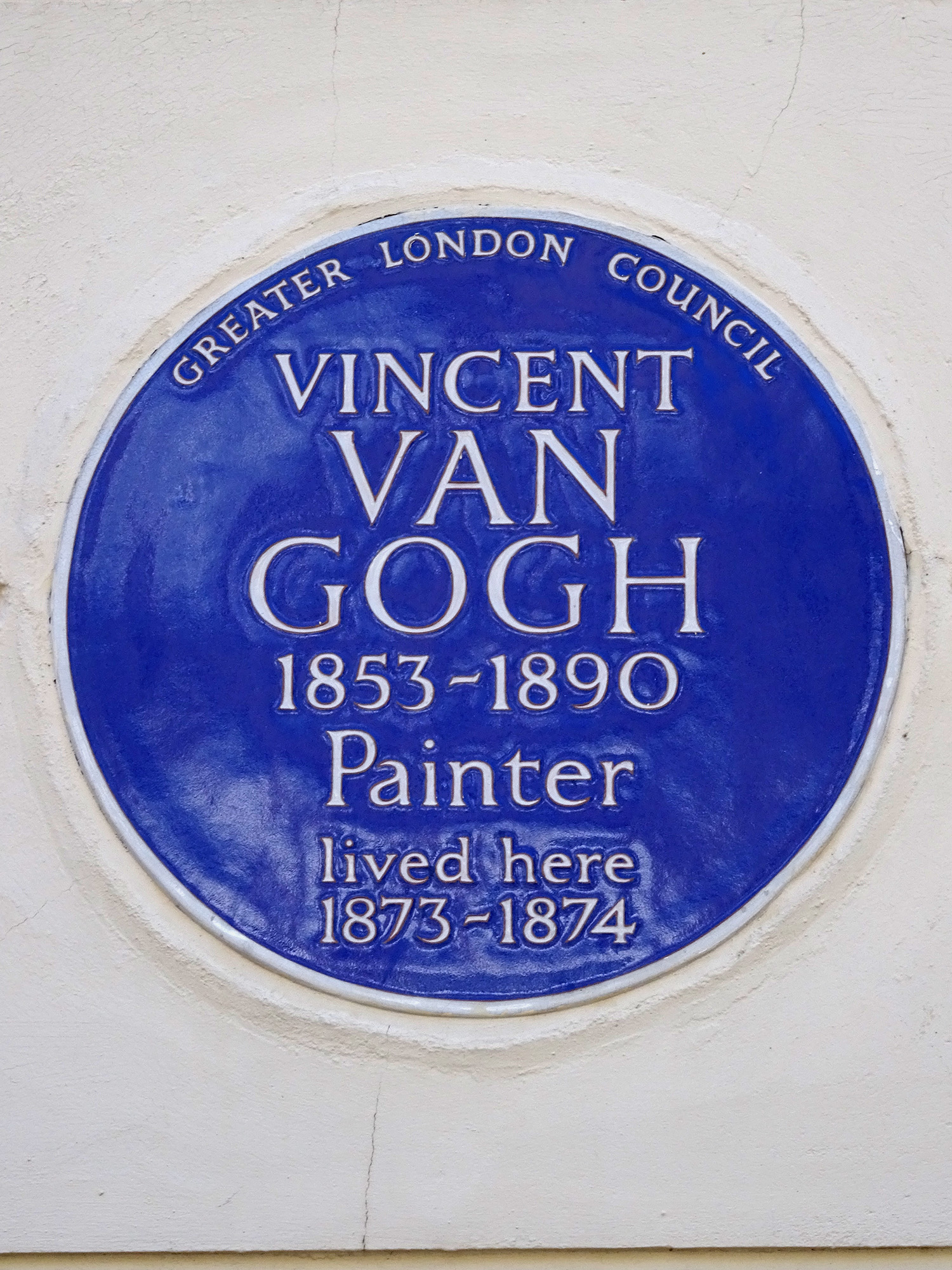
Blue plaque

The land and buildings of the Durand primary school site in Stockwell were owned by Lambeth Council until it forcibly academised in 2010 and became the single school in the Durand Academy Trust, an early academy trust. Immediately, the buildings were transferred to the ownership of a related private company, the Durand Educational Trust.

The headteacher, Sir Greg Martin used the new financial freedom to build a leisure centre. This sort of entrepreneurship was applauded by some Conservative Cabinet ministers at the time, and in particular found favour with Michael Gove. The trust awarded Martin with a salary which drew criticism across the educational press. This was discussed at UK Parliament Public Accounts Committee in January 2015.

Durand Academy Trust opened a satellite boarding school in Sussex in September 2014. The trust repeatedly failed to obtain the planning permission needed to develop the site, and ran at a loss. Initially this was funded by profits from the leisure centre business but had relied on the promise of funding of £17 million from the DfE to help support the boarding school project, which would have been the first of its kind in England. Schools Week reported in February 2016 that this satellite boarding school was in a deficit of £476,000 after one year. After three years it was sold and the Trust wrote off 1.6 million pounds that it had spent on lease adjustments and furniture and fittings.

Ofsted had described this as a good school in its inspection of 2013, but was called in again, due to concerns, in 2015 when the school had expanded and had the boarding school extension, which technically is not considered a separate school. It had gone from being a 3-13 school on two sites to being a 3–16 on three sites. A full inspection confirmed the fears and reported that its previous recommendations had been ignored and the school was now inadequate and the management was weak and did not have the capacity to make the necessary changes. Its strength were in KeyStage 2, student behaviour and nutrition. The school took Ofsted to court and won, Ofsted have appealed to a higher court. On the strength of this judgement the Secretary of State ordered that the school should be closed, and rebrokered, the assumed new sponsor was the Harris Federation.

It was assumed that the school would be rebrokered going from the Durand Academy Trust to the Harris Federation. The Education and Skills Funding Agency ruled that the buildings should be passed back to Lambeth Council at zero cost. Harris pulled out on discovering the complexity of the land ownership and leasing, and the risky legal agreements with Durand Educational Trust.

“Despite frequent requests since being asked by the DfE to bring Durand into the Harris Federation, governors of the school only provided us with the financial, legal and capital information we needed for our due diligence last month,”(May 2018) a Harris spokesperson said.

“Our finance board, which has experience of delivering 44 highly successful academies, reviewed this information and judged that we could not proceed.”

Since the school was rebrokered, the Durand Educational Trust no longer owns the school building, but still retains control of the land and the other buildings onsite. Assets of Durand Academy Trust, including the land and the school buildings were passed over to the Durant Educational Trust before Durand Academy Trust was liquidated. London Horizons, is a wholly owned the company that has built and manages a leisure centre on Durand Educational Trust land.

The school was accepted by the Dunraven Educational Trust, who were assisted by Harris. It has been rebranded as Van Gogh Primary.
