= Oak Hall, Haslemere =

- Location within Surrey
- 51°06′02″N 0°42′37″W
- Type: Country house
- Location: Haslemere

History
- Built: 1911

Site notes
- Area: Surrey
- Architect: Theophilus Arthur Allen
- Architectural style: Elizabethan Revival

Listed Building – Grade II
- Official name: Oak Hall (Wispers School)
- Designated: 7 January 2010
- Reference no.: 1393631

Oak Hall at Haslemere, Surrey, England is a Grade II listed country house. As of 2013 it houses Oak Hall Country Club, part of the Wispers Park retirement apartments.

== History ==
=== Residential house ===
The house was commissioned by Scottish artist James Coutts Michie and his wife from architect Theophilus Arthur Allen in 1910, and was completed in 1911. The house is built in the Elizabethan Revival style, which was popular in the Victorian period but may have appeared slightly old-fashioned by the time the house was built in the Edwardian period.

The house was listed as Grade II by English Heritage on 7 January 2010. The reasons for the listing, a statutory protection that prevents alteration to the building without prior Listed Building Consent, were given on the official listing document as:

- Architectural interest: as an Elizabethan style courtyard plan country house with varied compositional design, including crenellated corner tower, symmetrical entrance block and a series of gables to the other sides.
- Materials: for good quality brickwork with stone dressings and tile-hung gables, cast-iron rainwater goods and metal windows.
- Interiors: for good quality fittings to principal rooms including panelling, exposed roof trusses, main staircase, original doors, marquetry inlay to some floors, plastered ceilings, stone and marble fireplaces, marble floors, heraldic stained glass and tiled bathrooms.
- Intactness: the 1910 exteriors and the interiors of the principal rooms are little altered. The later school additions are of lesser interest.
- Rarity of building type: there are very few examples of houses being commissioned by artists, especially large country houses. A large north facing room on the first floor was probably built as an artist's studio.
- Historical interest: some historical interest as the country residence of the artist James Coutts Michie.

Mr Michie died in 1919 and Mrs Michie moved from Oak Hall in 1925, when it was leased to Miss Voy and Miss Keyte-Perry.

=== Oak Hall School ===
In 1925, the same year that they leased the property, the two ladies commissioned an architect, J. H. Howard, to build the large north-eastern extension to the house. They established the first school at the site, Oak Hall School, and in 1938 were able to buy the freehold of the property. Over the years more classrooms and dormitories were added.

In 1946 the Misses Voy and Keyte-Perry sold the house and estate to Norbert Hardy Wallis, who with his wife continued to run a school on the site until 1968.

=== Wispers School ===
In January 1969 Mr Wallis sold Oak Hall and its grounds to the Wispers School Educational Trust. Wispers School moved to Oak Hall from its previous site at West Dean House; it continued at Oak Hall until the closure of the School nearly 40 years later at the end of the 2008 summer term.

=== Proposed Oak Hall care village, Wispers Park ===
Planning consent to convert the Oak Hall complex of buildings into a "care village" for older residents has been obtained by the Nicolas James Group. The main building has been converted to a country club, and 30 apartments have been built in Howard Place, Wallis Court and Weycombe House on the 25-acre site. The whole development has been renamed Wispers Park.

== Oak Hall in popular culture ==
The BBC Three television series Leave Us Kids Alone was filmed at Oak Hall in the 2007 summer holidays.
