= Paignton Picture House =

Disused cinema in Devon, England

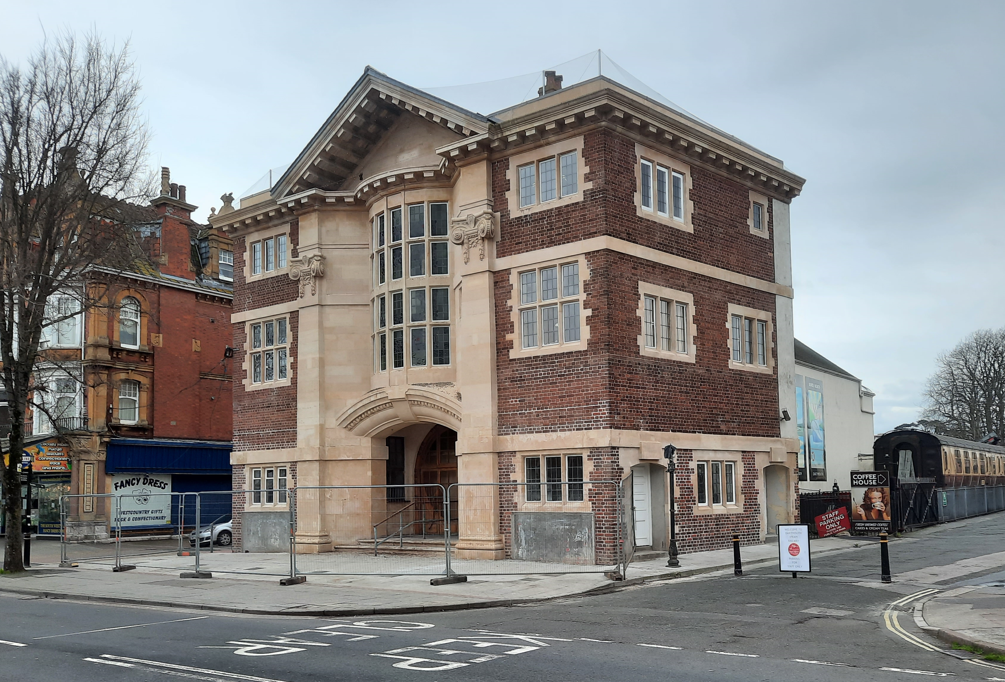
- The Paignton Picture House in January 2022

- Shown within Devon
- Coordinates: 50°26′6.720″N 3°33′51.696″W

Construction
- Opened: 16 March 1914
- Closed: 26 September 1999

Website
- paigntonpicturehouse.org

The Paignton Picture House is a currently disused cinema in Paignton, England, situated on Torbay Road.

== History ==
The Picture House was designed by the Paignton-based practice Hyams and Hobgen. It was opened on 16 March 1914. In its early days it featured a 21-piece orchestra, with each member paid a guinea to perform. There are 375 seats: 271 in the stalls, 104 in the circle, plus three private boxes at the back seating an additional eight.

=== Closure ===
The cinema closed down on 26 September 1999 following the opening of a multiplex cinema at the other end of the same road. It was bought by the Paignton & Dartmouth Steam Railway, which is adjacent, who had plans to turn it into a passenger waiting area. However, due to the building's Grade II listed building status, it is difficult to make any extensive changes and those plans were shelved.

More recently, there has been talk of returning the Paignton Picture House to its former glory, as a living film museum featuring films from the very first days of silent cinema through to the 1950s. The experience would be further enhanced by staff wearing period costume. However, discussions with the railway company have some way to go before the future of this historic building is known.

=== Restoration ===
The cinema was bought from the Paignton & Dartmouth Steam Railway by The Paignton Picture House Trust with a grant of £40,000 from Historic England and funding from Torbay Council. A further £49,000 was obtained from the Coastal Revival Fund to make the building safe and open the building for tours.

The Paignton Picture House Trust has been awarded a grant by Historic England of £206,680 towards the restoration, covering the full cost of essential repairs to the intricate stone work and unique stained glass windows. In December 2021, the first stage of the restoration project was completed, with the exterior of the building cleaned and repaired.

In March 2022 Torbay Council and partners received nearly £3m from the Cultural Development Fund (Department for Digital, Culture, Media and Sport) to continue restoration for an opening in 2025. A planning application was due to be submitted summer 2022 and work starting in 2023. The Cultural Development Funding included over £2.4m for capital works at the historic cinema, and followed an earlier Torbay Council commitment of £1.25m from its £13.36m Future High Streets Fund for Paignton, allocated by the then government's Department for Levelling Up.

In 2024, due to spiralling costs and a budget shortfall, the Paignton Picture House Trust requested further funding from Torbay Council, which was agreed by councillors at the Cabinet meeting on 26 November 2024. Restoration work began in early 2025.

=== Miscellanea ===
- Seat 2, Row 2 of the circle was the favourite seat of Torquay-born crime novelist Agatha Christie, who lived at Greenway House, near neighbouring Kingswear. The cinemas and theatres in her books are all reportedly based on the Paignton Picture House.
- The last film shown before closure was the deliberately ironic The Smallest Show on Earth.
- While the nearby Methodist church was being renovated, the local minister used the Paignton Picture House for services.

== Gallery ==
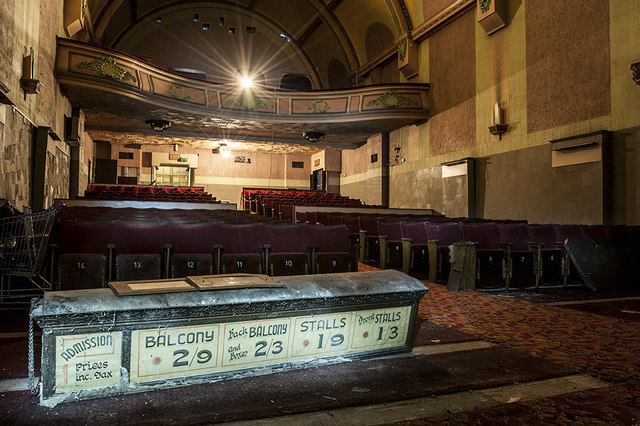
View from the stalls

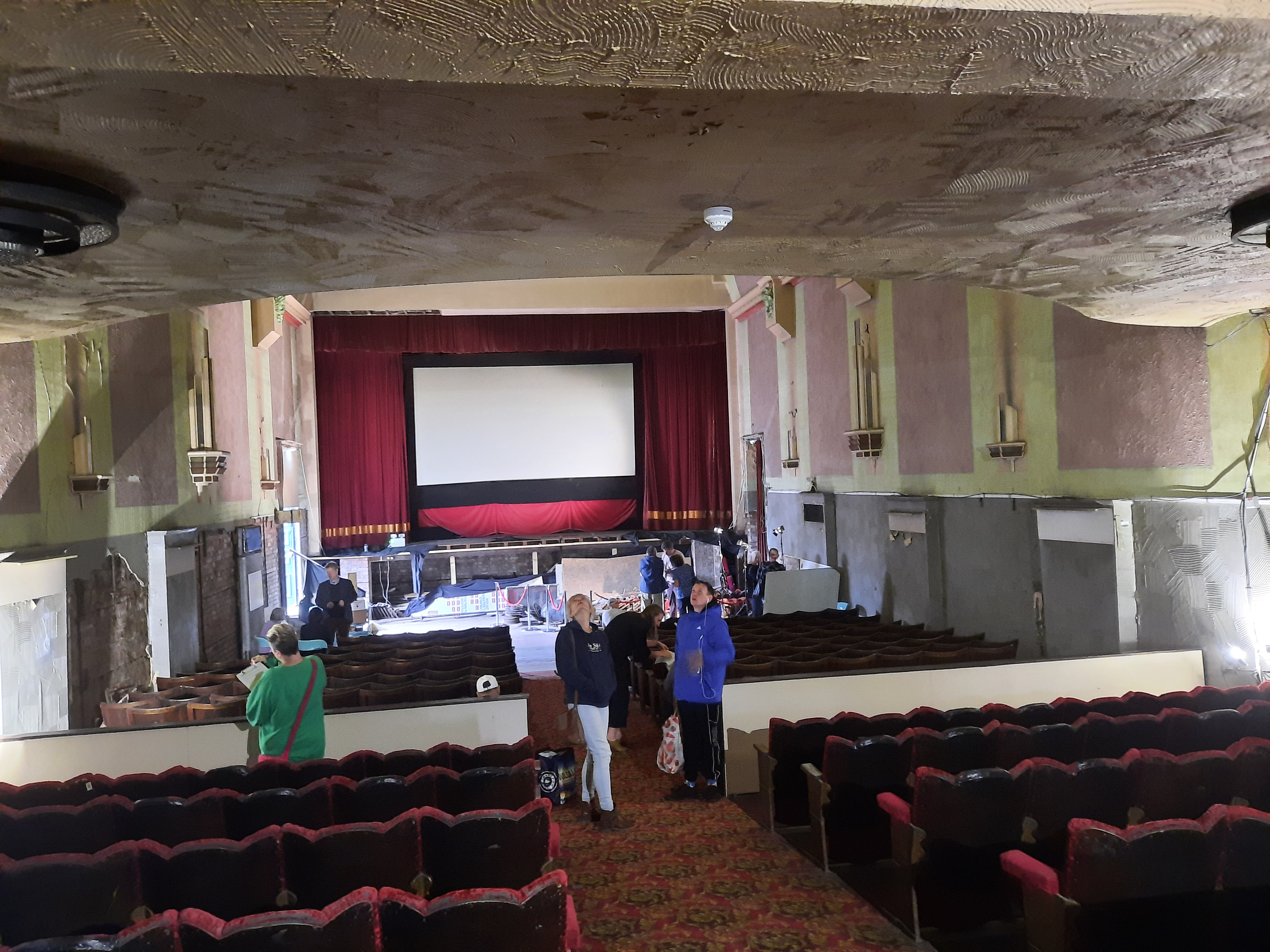
View from stalls 4 May 2022

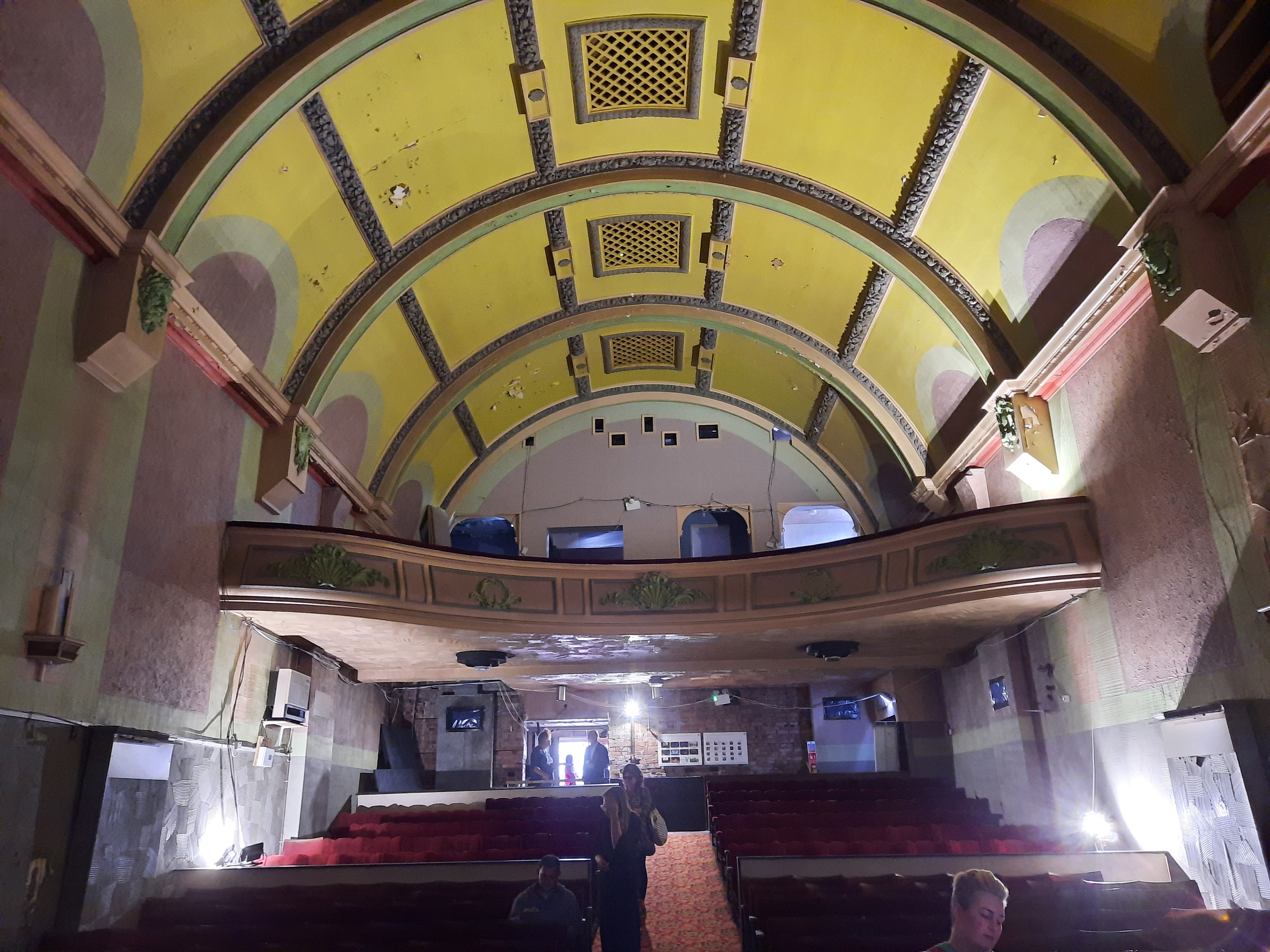
View from stalls looking rearward 4 May 2022

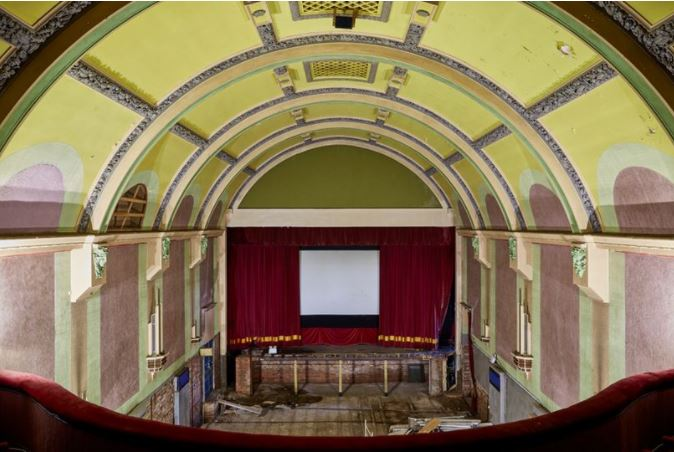
View from the circle

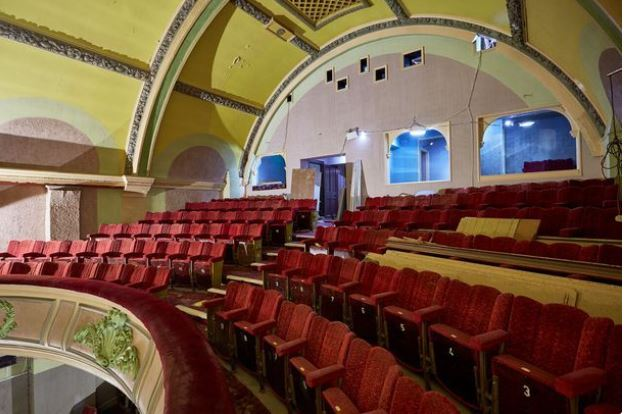
Upper circle

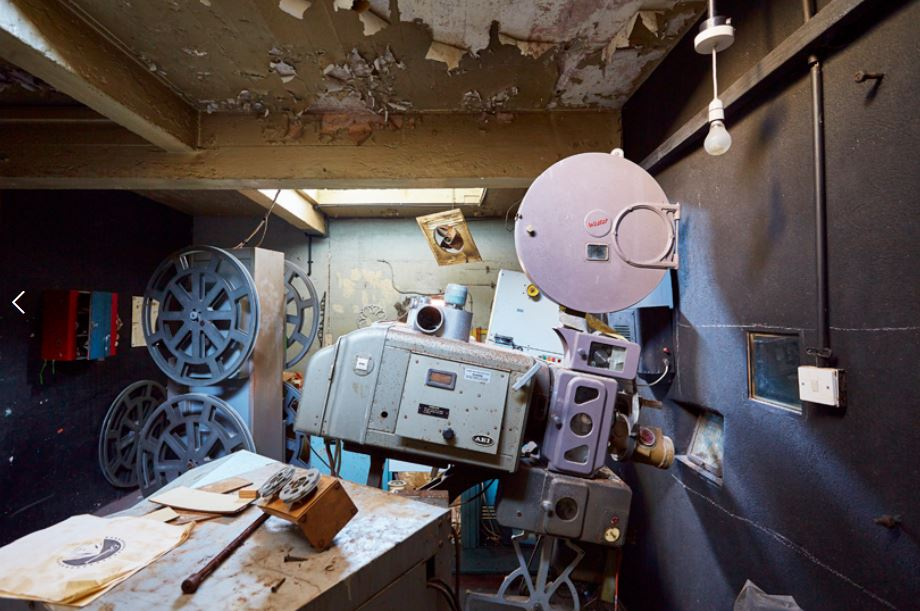
Projector room

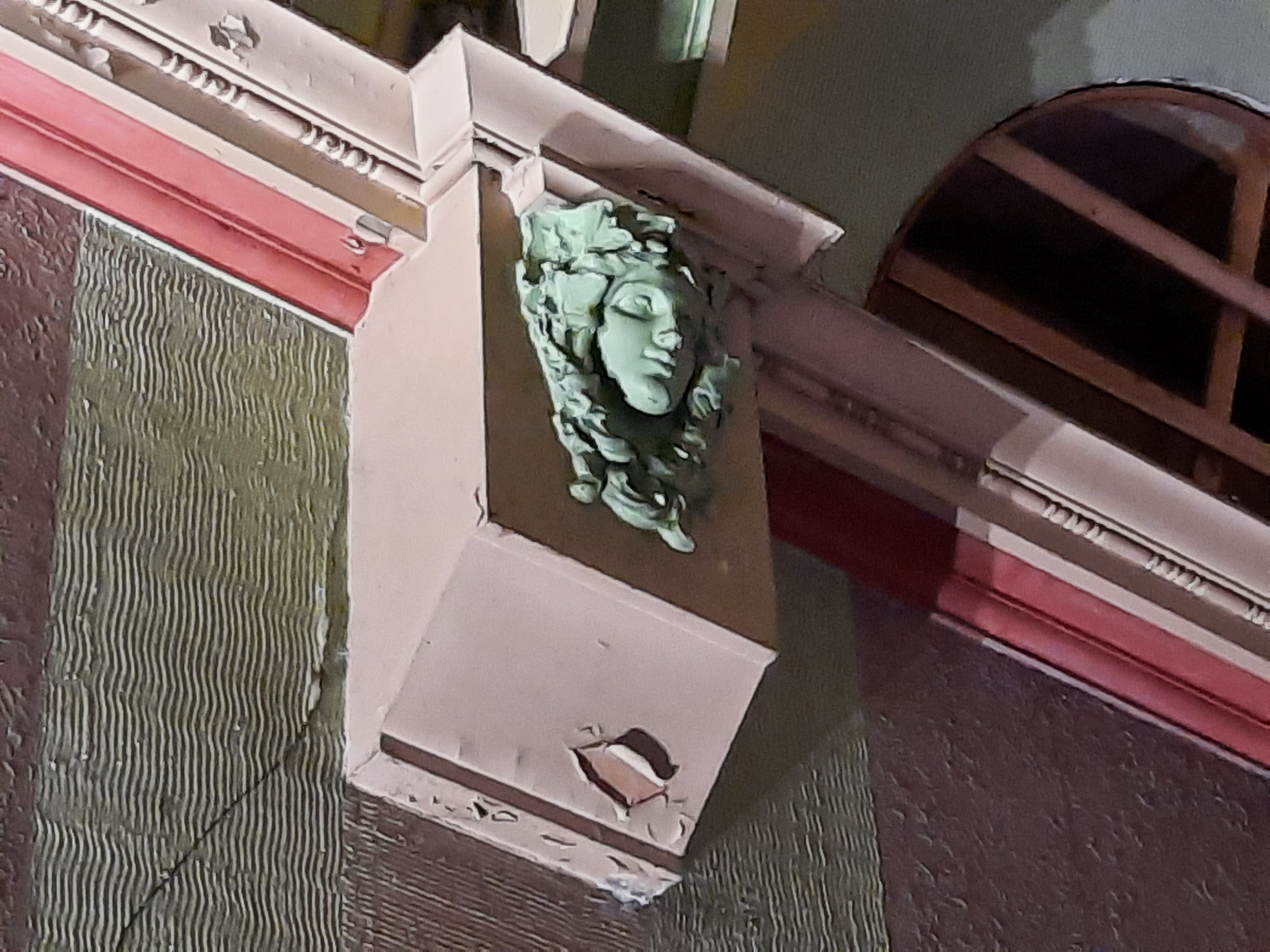
Mary Pickford in plasterwork

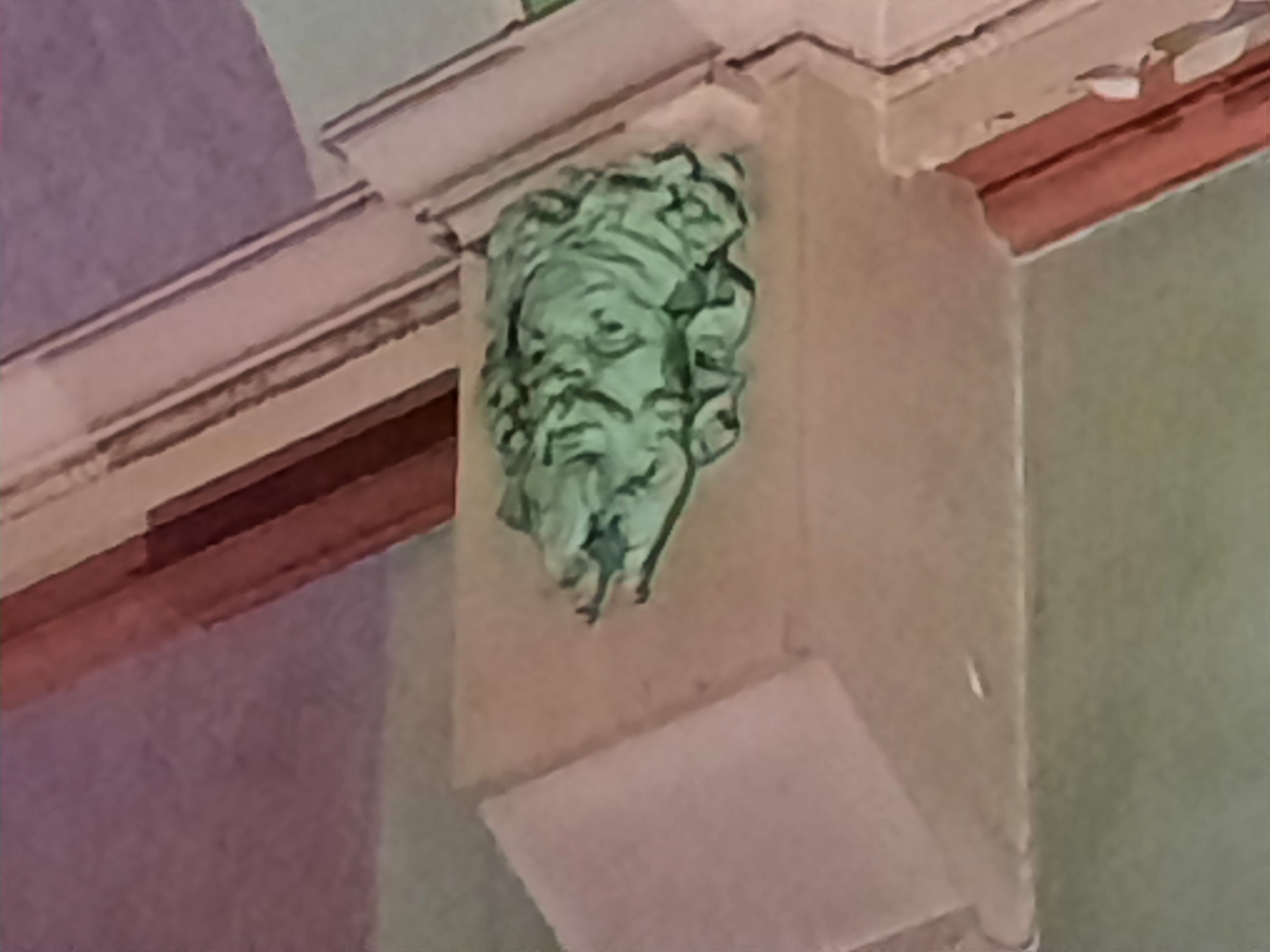
Purported to be Douglas Fairbanks in plasterwork.
