= Wispers School =

Defunct British girls' boarding school

Coordinates: 51.10052°N 0.71015°W

Wispers School was a British independent boarding school for girls aged between 11 and 18 which was founded in 1947 and which closed in 2008 after 61 years' operation. For the first part of its life it was based at Wispers, a large country house near Midhurst, West Sussex, UK. It was also briefly based at West Dean House, West Sussex, and then for the last 40 years of its existence at Oak Hall, Haslemere in Surrey.

== Midhurst ==
In 1946 Helen Brown, the wife of a vicar and brother of Sir Robert Benson Ewbank, bought Herries School in Cookham Dean in Berkshire. In 1947 her husband needed to be confined to a TB clinic near the south coast, and accordingly the school was to move to Wispers, a large country house designed by the architect Richard Norman Shaw, near Midhurst in West Sussex. For the start of the autumn term 1947 Herries School was split, with the local children remaining at the non-boarding junior school part of Herries in Cookham Dean, and the boarding contingent moving to Wispers. Herries School at Wispers was renamed Wispers School for the start of the autumn term 1949.

Writer Angela Lambert and actresses Susannah York and Pamela Salem attended the school in the early 1950s while it was based at Wispers.

== Locations ==
In 1956 the school moved to West Dean House in West Dean, West Sussex, which was owned at the time by Edward James. In 1964 James gave the house to a charitable trust, The Edward James Foundation, but the school was able to remain at West Dean until 1968.

In 1969 the school moved to a new site in Haslemere in Surrey when the Wispers School Trust purchased Oak Hall, in High Lane. The house had previously housed another school, Oak Hall School, and so was suitable for Wispers to take over without much modification being needed. The house and 26-acre site was found for the school by Ken Wood, a businessman who was chairman of the governors of Wispers School.

== Closure of the school ==
The 2008 decision to close the school was made unanimously by the board of governors, for two reasons: a falling roll of pupils due to a drop in demand for all-girls' boarding education, and rising costs. The May 2008 announcement of the closure was unexpected, especially as the school had recently received a glowing Ofsted report and had been given the award for "the most pro-active business in the community" in Haslemere Chamber of Trade and Commerce's 2008 awards.

At the time the school had 72 pupils. 46 staff were made redundant: 14 full-time and 15 part-time teaching staff, and 17 support staff involved in the running of the school and its site. The site and its buildings were sold, with the school's estimated £4 million-worth of assets used to establish a Wispers Education Trust, which provides bursaries for girls who would otherwise be unable to benefit from independent education.

== Wispers School in popular culture ==
A fictionalised version of the school and its pupils and staff is presented in Angela Lambert's 1990 novel, No Talking After Lights.

== Notable former pupils ==
- Susie Figgis, casting director
- Angela Lambert
- Pamela Salem
- Susannah York
