= Connaught Theatre =

Theatre and cinema in West Sussex, England

- Picturedrome, New Connaught Theatre
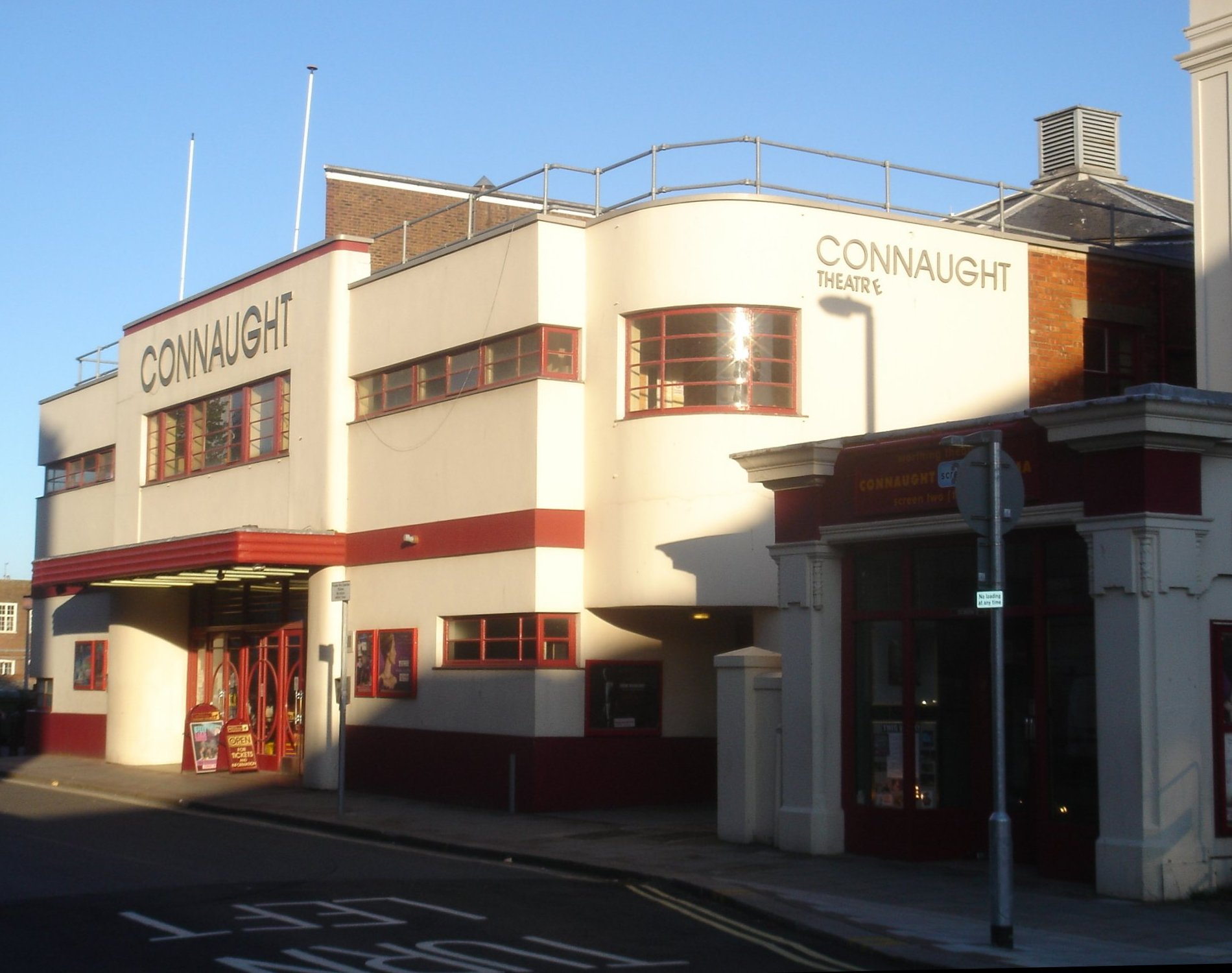
- The theatre from the northwest
- Interactive map of Connaught Theatre
- Address: Union Place; Worthing; England
- Coordinates: 50.8136°N 0.3704°W
- Owner: Worthing Borough Council
- Capacity: 520
- Type: Provincial
- Current use: Theatre/cinema
- Parking: On-site parking

Construction
- Opened: 1935 (built in 1914 as cinema)
- Years active: 1935–1966; 1967–present
- Architect: A.T. Goldsmith

Website
- worthingtheatres.co.uk

The Connaught Theatre is a Streamline Moderne-style theatre and cinema in the centre of Worthing, in West Sussex, England. Built as the Picturedrome cinema in 1914, the venue was extended in 1935 and became the new home of the Connaught Theatre (established nearby in 1931). The theatre houses touring West End theatre productions, musicals, thrillers, dramas and children's productions. Since 1987, it has been a dual use cinema/theatre with two screens, and has a seating capacity of 512. When it opened, it was a rare example of a conversion from a cinema to a theatre: the reverse was much more common in 1930s Britain, when many theatres became cinemas. The Connaught Studio (previously known as The Ritz cinema), next door, was the venue for the short-lived The End of the Pier International Film Festival.

== History ==
The Connaught Theatre occupies the former Picturedrome cinema, which was built in 1914 on the site of Stanmore Lodge and opened in July of that year. Its seating capacity was 850 in a single tier, with four boxes at the rear, and the auditorium was octagonal. In 1926, Swiss impresario Carl Adolf Seebold, who owned other cinemas in Worthing and who had been the Picturedrome's musical director since it opened, bought it.

In 1916, Connaught Buildings were built next to the cinema, and an entrance passageway was built from the street to the Picturedrome through the new building. The Connaught Buildings (and later Connaught Hall and Theatre) seem to have taken its name from Prince Arthur, Duke of Connaught and Strathern and Earl of Sussex. The new premises housed the Connaught Hall, which in 1917 became a venue for vaudeville entertainment. It was licensed as a theatre in April 1931 by Walter Lindsay, formerly a theatre director in London; the first full season of repertory theatre began in the autumn of 1932. Terence De Marney became director of Connaught and Bill Fraser became involved in the theatre.

In 2014, Connaught theatre celebrated its centenary of service. Several well-known actors had their start in this theatre like; Elizabeth Spriggs, Christopher Lee, Peter Cushing and Ian Holm.

The two venues coexisted until 1935; in that year the Worthing Repertory Company, which had been outgrowing the Connaught Buildings, moved next door to the Picturedrome, renamed the building the Connaught Theatre and commissioned an architect to extend the façade of the building in an Art Deco style. Carl Seebold contributed £60,000 (£3,689,000 as of 2025) towards the cost of the work. The first production, a play called Theatre Royal, was given on 30 September 1935; it formed the centrepiece of a special opening week programme, and was very successful.

The establishment of the Connaught in former cinema premises represented an unusual reversal of the contemporary tendency for theatres to be converted into cinemas—a trend seen throughout Britain in the 1930s.

A temporary closure during World War II was followed by a period in which the theatre was managed on Seebold's behalf by a group associated with the J. Arthur Rank Organisation, who pursued a policy of employing young actors who later became important figures in film, television and theatre. Glenda Jackson, Susannah York, Charles Morgan, Maria Charles and several others appeared at the theatre during this period. In the 1950s, Alan Ayckbourn appeared in several plays at the Connaught. In 1956, Winston Churchill visited the theatre to see his daughter Sarah perform in Terence Rattigan's play Variation on a Theme. Harold Pinter acted at the Connaught under the stage name David Baron, moving to a house just a few yards from the theatre in Ambrose Place in the 1960s. Pinter's first wife, actress Vivien Merchant acted at the Connaught during this period. Giles Cooper worked with Pinter at the Connaught. Robin Maugham wrote several plays which he directed and premiered at the Connaught, including The Claimant (1962) and Winter in Ischia (1964). Actress Marina Sirtis, perhaps best known for her role on Star Trek: The Next Generation, began her career in repertory at the Connaught in 1976. Actor Robert Blythe has also worked in repertory theatre at the Connaught.

Ownership passed from Seebold to other commercial interests in April 1950, when he sold the lease for £35,000 (£1,036,000 as of 2025). The theatre began to struggle, and closed in 1966, but campaigners successfully petitioned Worthing Borough Council to buy and run it instead. Productions began again in 1967— one of the first performances was The Beggar's Opera, the first opera seen in Worthing for 136 years— and the capacity was increased to its present 512 seats when the auditorium was revamped in 1972. The council agreed to provide more funding for the theatre after it was forced to close temporarily on two more occasions in the 1970s. The remodelling in 1972 introduced film projection facilities, which have been used regularly since 1987.

== Architecture ==
Originally designed by Eastbourne architect Peter Dulvey Stonham, the building was refurbished in 1933 to the plans of A.T. Goldsmith. His design added a new first-floor cocktail bar and lounge area to the original Picturedrome auditorium. Two years later, the entrance foyer on Union Place was rebuilt in Moderne style, with two rendered storeys, parapeted, in three bays.

== Facilities ==
The theatre has a licensed bar, cloakroom facilities, disabled facilities and parking.
